= National Register of Historic Places listings in Charlottesville, Virginia =

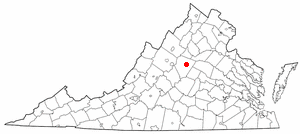
Location of Charlottesville in Virginia

Charlottesville, Virginia, United States, has 70 properties and districts listed on the National Register of Historic Places.

The locations of National Register properties and districts for which the latitude and longitude coordinates are included below, may be seen in an online map.

This National Park Service list is complete through NPS recent listings posted October 23, 2026.

== Current listings ==
	Name on the Register	Image	Date listed	Location	Description
1	Abell-Gleason House	Abell-Gleason House	February 16, 2001 (#01000151)	521 N. 1st St. 38°02′07″N 78°28′47″W	
2	Albemarle County Courthouse Historic District	Albemarle County Courthouse Historic District	June 30, 1972 (#72001503)	Courthouse Sq. and surrounding properties 38°01′54″N 78°28′39″W	
3	Anderson Brothers Building	Anderson Brothers Building	October 21, 1982 (#82001797)	1417-1427 University Ave. 38°02′05″N 78°30′00″W	
4	Armstrong Knitting Factory	Armstrong Knitting Factory	October 21, 1982 (#82001798)	700 Harris St. 38°02′09″N 78°29′03″W	
5	Barringer Mansion	Barringer Mansion	October 21, 1982 (#82001799)	1404 Jefferson Park Ave. 38°01′54″N 78°30′08″W	
6	Belmont	Belmont	October 21, 1982 (#82001800)	759 Belmont Ave. 38°01′29″N 78°28′38″W	
7	Jackson P. Burley High School		November 24, 2020 (#100005836)	901 Rose Hill Dr. 38°02′22″N 78°29′10″W	
8	Carter-Gilmer House	Carter-Gilmer House	October 21, 1982 (#82001801)	802 E. Jefferson St. 38°01′51″N 78°28′31″W	
9	Charlottesville and Albemarle County Courthouse Historic District	Charlottesville and Albemarle County Courthouse Historic District	July 28, 1982 (#82004904)	Roughly bounded by Park, Water, Saxton, and Main Sts. 38°01′53″N 78°28′42″W	
10	Charlottesville Coca-Cola Bottling Works	Charlottesville Coca-Cola Bottling Works	February 27, 2013 (#13000045)	722 Preston Ave. 38°02′10″N 78°29′17″W	
11	Charlottesville Downtown Mall Historic District	Charlottesville Downtown Mall Historic District	February 5, 2024 (#100009471)	Main Street from Water Street to East 7th Street and pedestrianized sections of 1st Street, East 2nd Street, East 3rd Street, and East 5th Street; 38°01′47″N 78°28′43″W	
12	Dabney-Thompson House	Dabney-Thompson House	January 10, 1984 (#84003498)	1602 Gordon Ave. 38°02′24″N 78°29′57″W	
13	Daughters of Zion Cemetery	Daughters of Zion Cemetery	June 24, 2010 (#10000382)	Corner of 1st and Oak Sts. 38°01′36″N 78°29′04″W	
14	Delevan Baptist Church	Delevan Baptist Church	October 21, 1982 (#82001802)	632 W. Main St. 38°01′52″N 78°29′23″W	
15	Enderly	Enderly	October 21, 1982 (#82001803)	603 Watson Ave. 38°02′27″N 78°28′14″W	
16	Ficklin-Crawford Cottage	Ficklin-Crawford Cottage	October 21, 1982 (#82001804)	1200 Carlton Ave. 38°01′24″N 78°28′18″W	
17	Fifeville and Tonsler Neighborhoods Historic District	Fifeville and Tonsler Neighborhoods Historic District	June 18, 2009 (#09000452)	Bounded by Cherry Ave to the south, the railway to the north, 4th St., SW, to the east, and Spring St. to the west 38°01′45″N 78°29′21″W	
18	The Foster Site	The Foster Site	May 16, 2016 (#16000259)	1540 Jefferson Park Ave. 38°01′54″N 78°30′16″W	
19	Four Acres	Four Acres	October 21, 1982 (#82001805)	1314 Rugby Rd. 38°02′58″N 78°29′25″W	
20	Fry's Spring Historic District	Fry's Spring Historic District	November 19, 2014 (#14000944)	Roughly Highland, Jefferson Park, Monte Vista, Stribling, Raymond, Robertson, Sunset, and Todd Aves., and Hill St. 38°01′08″N 78°30′48″W	
21	Gardner-Mays Cottage	Gardner-Mays Cottage	October 21, 1982 (#82001806)	1022 Grove St. 38°01′45″N 78°29′55″W	
22	Thomas and Alena Hammond House		January 8, 2026 (#100012508)	1708 Yorktown Drive; 38°03′30″N 78°28′36″W	
23	Hard Bargain	Hard Bargain	January 10, 1984 (#84003521)	1105 Park St. 38°02′35″N 78°28′16″W	
24	Charles B. Holt House	Charles B. Holt House	April 14, 2006 (#06000320)	1010 Preston Ave. 38°02′22″N 78°29′31″W	
25	Hotel Gleason/Albemarle Hotel, Imperial Cafe	Hotel Gleason/Albemarle Hotel, Imperial Cafe	August 10, 1983 (#83003267)	617-619 W. Main St. 38°01′53″N 78°29′20″W	
26	House at Pireus	House at Pireus	August 10, 1983 (#83003268)	302 Riverside Ave. 38°01′19″N 78°27′21″W	
27	Thomas Jonathan Jackson Sculpture	Thomas Jonathan Jackson Sculpture	May 16, 1997 (#97000446)	Jackson Park, bounded by High, Jefferson, and 4th Sts., and the Albemarle County Courthouse; 38°01′55″N 78°28′41″W	
28	Jefferson School, Carver Recreation Center, and School Site	Jefferson School, Carver Recreation Center, and School Site	February 15, 2006 (#06000050)	233 4th St., NW. 38°01′56″N 78°29′13″W	
29	Martha Jefferson Historic District	Martha Jefferson Historic District	February 21, 2008 (#08000066)	Includes parts of Lexington, Locust, and Grove Aves., and E. High, Maple, Sycamore, Poplar, and Hazel Sts. 38°01′59″N 78°28′13″W	
30	Thomas Jefferson Inn	Thomas Jefferson Inn	September 11, 2025 (#100012195)	1301 Emmet Street North; 38°03′16″N 78°29′52″W	The building was previously used as the Federal Executive Institute.
31	King Lumber Company Warehouse	King Lumber Company Warehouse	August 10, 1983 (#83003269)	608 Preston Ave. 38°02′06″N 78°29′10″W	
32	King-Runkle House	King-Runkle House	August 10, 1983 (#83003270)	201 14th St., NW. 38°02′05″N 78°29′58″W	
33	Robert Edward Lee Sculpture	Robert Edward Lee Sculpture	May 16, 1997 (#97000447)	Lee Park, bounded by Market, Jefferson, 1st, and 2nd Sts., NE. 38°01′55″N 78°28′50″W	
34	Lewis Farm	Lewis Farm	October 21, 1982 (#82001807)	1201 Jefferson St. 38°01′44″N 78°28′08″W	
35	Meriwether Lewis and William Clark Sculpture	Meriwether Lewis and William Clark Sculpture	May 16, 1997 (#97000449)	Junction of Ridge and W. Main Sts., and McIntire Rd. 38°01′50″N 78°29′07″W	
36	Locust Grove	Locust Grove	October 21, 1982 (#82001808)	810 Locust Ave. 38°02′08″N 78°28′05″W	
37	Marshall-Rucker-Smith House	Marshall-Rucker-Smith House	June 25, 1999 (#99000725)	620 Park St. 38°02′08″N 78°28′30″W	
38	McConnell-Neve House	McConnell-Neve House	August 10, 1983 (#83003271)	228 14th St., NW. 38°02′09″N 78°29′54″W	
39	William H. McGuffey Primary School	William H. McGuffey Primary School	December 23, 2009 (#09001156)	201 2nd St., NW. 38°01′56″N 78°28′56″W	
40	James Minor House		April 3, 2025 (#100011625)	1817 Fendall Avenue; 38°02′40″N 78°29′58″W	
41	Montebello	Montebello	October 23, 2003 (#03001085)	1700 Stadium Rd. 38°01′50″N 78°30′35″W	
42	Morea	Morea	May 3, 1984 (#84003522)	209-211 Sprigg Lane; 38°02′22″N 78°30′32″W	
43	Mount Zion Baptist Church	Mount Zion Baptist Church	October 15, 1992 (#92001388)	105 Ridge St. 38°01′48″N 78°29′08″W	
44	North Belmont Neighborhood Historic District	North Belmont Neighborhood Historic District	May 31, 2018 (#100002528)	Roughly Avon, Castalia, Church, Douglas, Goodman, Graves, Levy, Little Graves, Meridian, Rialto, and Sonoma Sts., and Belmont, Carlton, Hinton, and Monticello Aves. 38°01′20″N 78°28′36″W	
45	Oak Lawn	Oak Lawn	May 25, 1973 (#73002204)	Cherry Ave. and 9th St. 38°01′40″N 78°29′47″W	
46	Oakhurst-Gildersleeve Neighborhood Historic District	Oakhurst-Gildersleeve Neighborhood Historic District	March 25, 2009 (#09000161)	Oakhurst Circle, Gildersleeve Wood, Valley Rd., Valley Circle, and parts of Maywood Lane and Jefferson Park Ave. 38°01′51″N 78°30′24″W	
47	Patton Mansion	Patton Mansion	October 21, 1982 (#82001809)	1018 W. Main St. 38°01′57″N 78°29′44″W	
48	Paxton Place	Paxton Place	October 21, 1982 (#82001810)	503 W. Main St. 38°01′52″N 78°29′16″W	
49	Peyton-Ellington Building	Peyton-Ellington Building	October 21, 1982 (#82001811)	711 W. Main St. 38°01′54″N 78°29′25″W	
50	Piereus Store	Piereus Store	August 10, 1983 (#83003272)	1901 E. Market St. 38°01′18″N 78°27′22″W	
51	Pitts-Inge	Pitts-Inge	October 21, 1982 (#82001812)	331-333 W. Main St. 38°01′50″N 78°29′11″W	
52	Preston Court Apartments	Preston Court Apartments	October 29, 2007 (#07001134)	1600 Grady Ave. 38°02′29″N 78°29′56″W	
53	Recoleta	Recoleta	August 11, 2004 (#04000858)	120 Rothery Rd. 38°02′23″N 78°30′34″W	
54	Ridge Street Historic District	Ridge Street Historic District	October 21, 1982 (#82001813)	200-700 Ridge St. 38°01′40″N 78°29′12″W	
55	Judge William J. Robertson House	Judge William J. Robertson House	December 22, 1999 (#99001601)	705 Park St. 38°02′13″N 78°28′33″W	
56	Rugby Road-University Corner Historic District	Rugby Road-University Corner Historic District	February 16, 1984 (#84003523)	Roughly bounded by University Ave., Wayside Pl., 14th St., and U.S. Route 29; 38°02′08″N 78°30′03″W	Extends into Albemarle County
57	Stonefield	Stonefield	January 10, 1984 (#84003524)	1204 Rugby Rd. 38°02′53″N 78°29′31″W	
58	Sunnyside	Sunnyside	October 23, 2003 (#03001086)	2150 Barracks Rd. 38°03′20″N 78°30′13″W	
59	Timberlake-Branham House	Timberlake-Branham House	January 10, 1984 (#84003525)	1512 E. Market St. 38°01′27″N 78°27′46″W	
60	Benjamin Tonsler House	Benjamin Tonsler House	August 10, 1983 (#83003274)	327 6th St. 38°01′42″N 78°29′26″W	
61	Turner-LaRowe House	Turner-LaRowe House	August 10, 1983 (#83003275)	1 University Court; 38°02′16″N 78°29′54″W	
62	Robert L. Updike House	Robert L. Updike House	August 10, 1983 (#83003276)	620 Prospect Ave. 38°01′31″N 78°29′39″W	
63	John Vowles House	John Vowles House	November 2, 1989 (#89001928)	1111-1113 W. Main St. 38°01′59″N 78°29′48″W	
64	Wertland Street Historic District	Wertland Street Historic District	February 14, 1985 (#85000298)	Wertland St. between 10th and 14th Sts. 38°02′05″N 78°29′47″W	
65	West Main Street Historic District	West Main Street Historic District	September 18, 2017 (#100001641)	Parts of W. Main St., 6th, 4th, and 8th Sts., NW., and Ridge St. 38°01′52″N 78°29′19″W	
66	White Cross-Huntley Hall	White Cross-Huntley Hall	October 21, 1982 (#82001814)	152 Stribling Ave. 38°01′20″N 78°31′12″W	
67	Woolen Mills Chapel	Woolen Mills Chapel	October 21, 1982 (#82001815)	1819 E. Market St. 38°01′19″N 78°27′23″W	
68	Woolen Mills Village Historic District	Woolen Mills Village Historic District	April 12, 2010 (#10000196)	Parts of Chesapeake, Franklin, Steephill, 18th NE., and E. Market Sts., and Riverside Ave.; and parts of Pireus Row and Marchant and E. Market St. 38°01′23″N 78°27′33″W	Extends into Albemarle County
69	Wynhurst	Wynhurst	October 21, 1982 (#82001816)	605 Preston Pl. 38°02′30″N 78°29′55″W	
70	Young Building	Young Building	October 21, 1982 (#82001817)	1102 Carlton Ave. 38°01′17″N 78°28′03″W	

== Former listings ==
	Name on the Register	Image	Date listed	Date removed	Location	Description
1	Rose Cottage/Peyton House	Rose Cottage/Peyton House	August 10, 1983 (#83003273)	February 7, 2017	800 Delevan St. 38°01′50″N 78°29′31″W	Destroyed by fire in 1991.

== See also ==
- List of National Historic Landmarks in Virginia
- National Register of Historic Places listings in Virginia
- National Register of Historic Places listings in Albemarle County, Virginia
