= Peyton House =

Peyton House or Peyton Building may refer to:

- Peyton House (Raymond, Mississippi), listed on the NRHP in Mississippi
- Peyton-Ellington Building, Charlottesville, Virginia, listed on the NRHP in Virginia
- Rose Cottage/Peyton House, Charlottesville, Virginia, listed on the NRHP in Virginia
- Peyton Building and Peyton Annex, Spokane, Washington, listed on the NRHP in Washington
