= Stonefield =

Stonefield may refer to:

- Stonefield (band), an Australian Psychedelic rock band
  - Stonefield (album) studio album by the band
- Stonefield Castle, also known as Barmore House, 17th century manor house in Scotland
- Stonefield, a neighbourhood in Blantyre, South Lanarkshire
- Stonefield (Charlottesville, Virginia), historic home built about 1860
- Stonefield (Wisconsin), an 1868 mansion in Wisconsin on the U.S. National Register of Historic Places
- Steinfeld, South Australia, an Australian place known as Stonefield between 1918 and 1986
- Stonefield Beach State Recreation Site in Oregon, USA
