= West Main Street Historic District (Charlottesville, Virginia) =

Historic district in Virginia, United States

- U.S. National Register of Historic Places
- U.S. Historic district
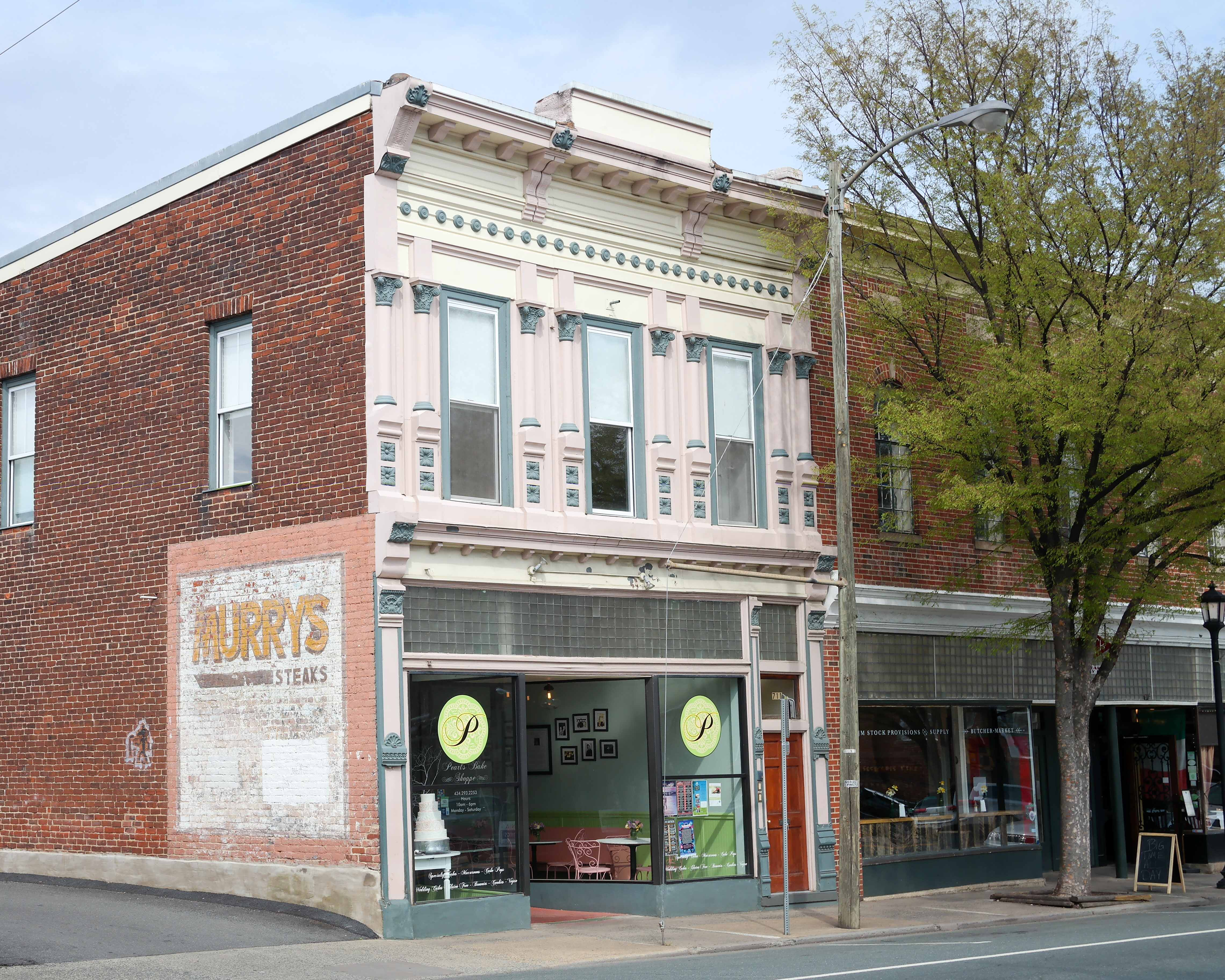
- Commercial buildings at Cream Street

- Location within Virginia Location within the United States
- Location: Parts of W. Main St., 6th, 4th, and 8th Sts., NW., and Ridge St., Charlottesville, Virginia
- Coordinates: 38°1′52″N 78°29′19″W
- Area: 16.8 acres (6.8 ha)
- Architect: Multiple
- Architectural style: Late 19th And 20th Century Revivals, Late Victorian, Vernacular Victorian
- NRHP reference No.: 100001641
- Added to NRHP: September 18, 2017

The West Main Street Historic District encompasses a late 19th and early 20th century commercial area of Charlottesville, Virginia, developed during the area's growth as a streetcar suburb. It is basically linear in character, extending along West Main Street from Ridge Street in the east to the railroad crossing west of 8th Street in the west. The oldest building in the district is the c. 1820 Inge's Store, and the district includes the city's memorial to Meriwether Lewis and William Clark.

The district was listed on the National Register of Historic Places in 2017.

== See also ==
- National Register of Historic Places listings in Charlottesville, Virginia
