= Four Acres =

Four Acres may refer to:

- Four Acres, a former ground of West Bromwich Albion F.C.
- Four Acres, California, an unincorporated community in Placer County, California
- Four Acres (Charlottesville, Virginia), a historic home located at Charlottesville, Virginia
