= Woolen Mills Village Historic District =

Historic district in Virginia, United States

- U.S. National Register of Historic Places
- U.S. Historic district
- Virginia Landmarks Register
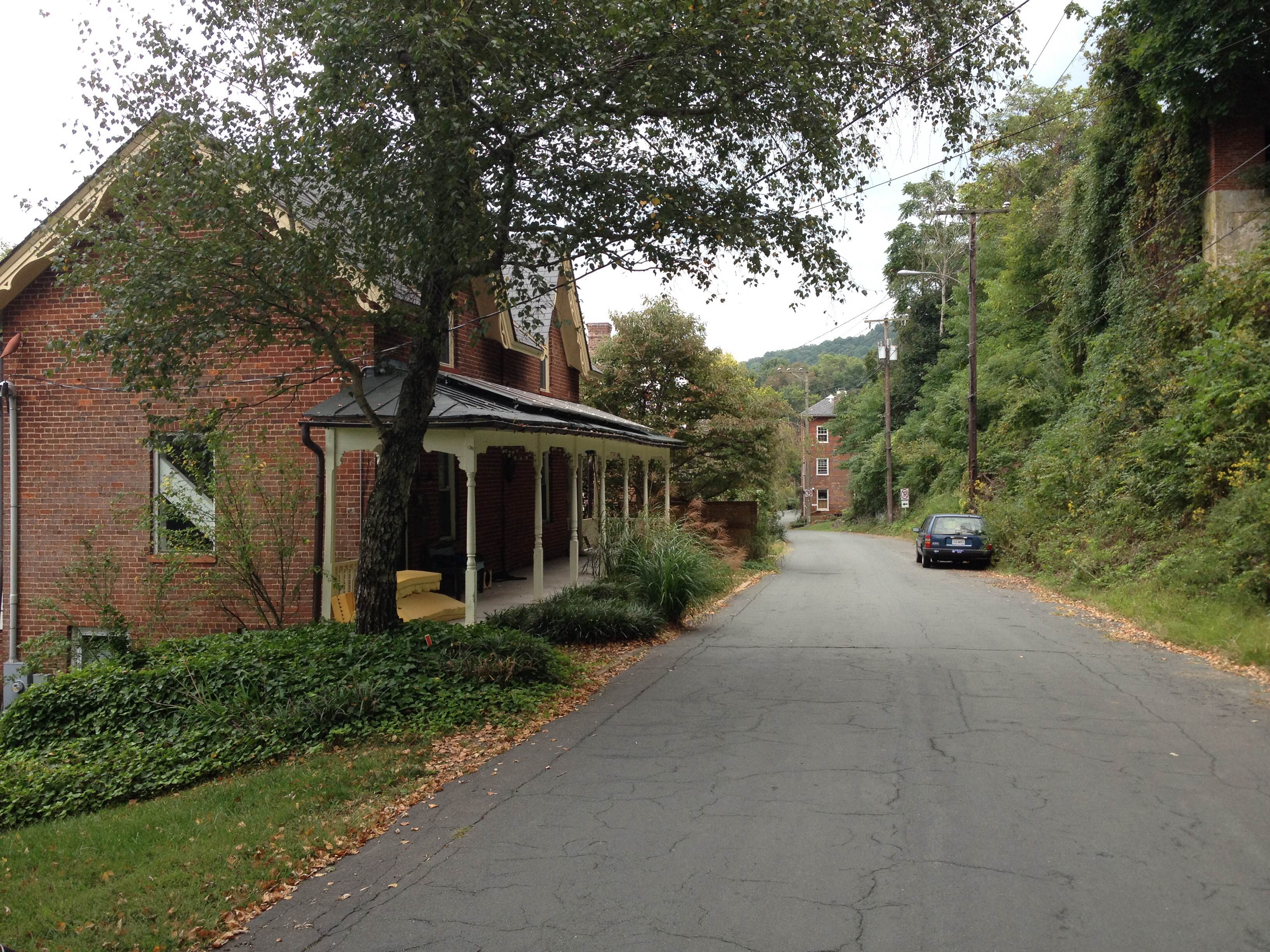

- Location within Virginia
- Location: Area includes parts of Chesapeake, Franklin, Steephill, 18th NE, and East Market Streets and Riverside Avenue in the City of Charlottesville; and parts of Pireus Row and Marchant and East Market Streets in Albemarle County, Charlottesville, Virginia and Albemarle County, Virginia
- Coordinates: 38°1′17.78″N 78°27′22.92″W
- NRHP reference No.: 10000196
- VLR No.: 002-1260

Significant dates
- Added to NRHP: April 12, 2010
- Designated VLR: December 17, 2009

Woolen Mills Village Historic District is a historic district that was listed on the National Register of Historic Places on April 12, 2010. The district is in Albemarle County, Virginia and also in Charlottesville, Virginia.

Its area includes parts of Chesapeake, Franklin, Steephill, 18th NE, and East Market Streets and Riverside Avenue in the City of Charlottesville; and parts of Pireus Row and Marchant and East Market Streets in Albemarle County.
The district includes Woolen Mills Chapel, previously listed on the National Register.

== See also ==
- National Register of Historic Places listings in Charlottesville, Virginia
- National Register of Historic Places listings in Albemarle County, Virginia
