= Fry's Spring Historic District =

Historic district in Virginia, United States

- U.S. National Register of Historic Places
- U.S. Historic district
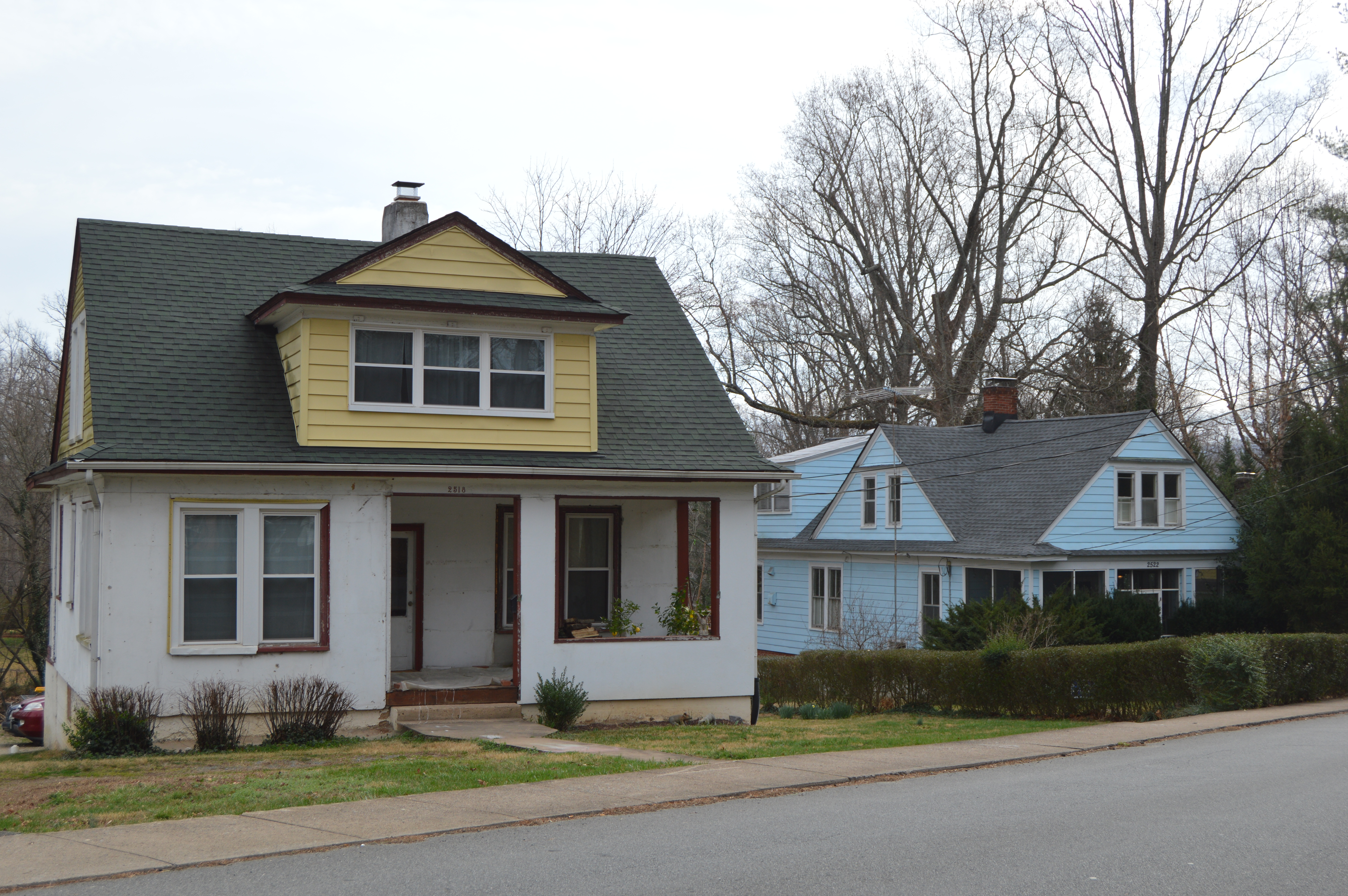
- Houses on Jefferson Park Avenue

- Location within Virginia Location within the United States
- Location: Roughly Highland, Jefferson Park, Monte Vista, Stribling, Raymond, Robertson, Sunset & Todd Aves., Hill St., Charlottesville, Virginia
- Coordinates: 38°1′28″N 78°30′46″W
- Area: 150 acres (61 ha)
- Built: 1890
- NRHP reference No.: 14000944
- Added to NRHP: November 19, 2014

The Fry's Spring Historic District encompasses a residential neighborhood of Charlottesville, Virginia, which was developed between 1890 and 1963. Prior to its development, it was a largely wooded area owned for much of the 19th century by the Fry family. The 150-acre (61 ha) district is centered on the private Fry's Spring Beach Club, whose property includes the eponymous spring, and includes 300 mainly residential buildings with historic character. The architectural styles that predominate in the district are Craftsman and Colonial Revival, although other revival styles such as the Spanish and Tudor Revival are represented by smaller numbers of buildings. There are also four churches in the district. The district extends southward along Jefferson Park Avenue, south of the railroad tracks, and radiates out along Stribling, Todd, Robert, and Raymond Avenues as far as Highland Avenue. Another cluster of streets at the southern end of the district includes Jefferson Park Circle, and portions of Eton Road and Monte Vista Avenue.

The district was listed on the National Register of Historic Places in 2014. It includes the previously-listed White Cross–Huntley Hall.

== See also ==
- National Register of Historic Places listings in Charlottesville, Virginia
