= Paxton Place =

Historic house in Virginia, United States

- U.S. National Register of Historic Places
- Virginia Landmarks Register
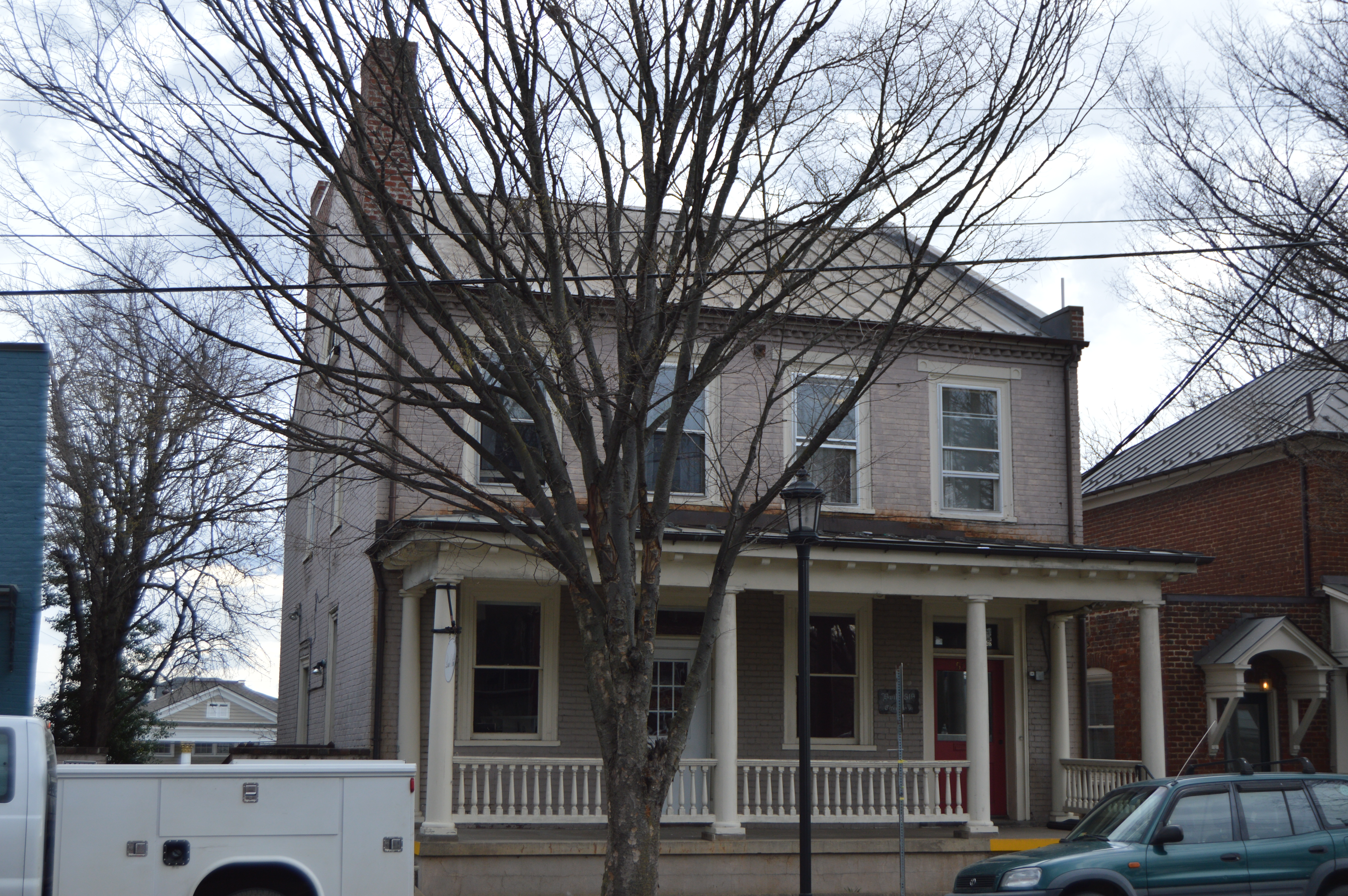
- Front and western side

- Location within Virginia Location within the United States
- Location: 503 W. Main St., Charlottesville, Virginia
- Coordinates: 38°1′51″N 78°29′18″W
- Area: Less than 1 acre (0.40 ha)
- Built: c. 1824
- Architectural style: Federal
- MPS: Charlottesville MRA
- NRHP reference No.: 82001810
- VLR No.: 104-0385

Significant dates
- Added to NRHP: October 21, 1982
- Designated VLR: October 20, 1981

Paxton Place is a historic home located at Charlottesville, Virginia. It was built about 1824, and is a 2 1/2-story, four-bay, Federal style brick dwelling. It has a side gable roof and two interior chimneys connected by a curtain. The house has been occupied by the Shisler Funeral Home and the Loyal Order of Moose Lodge.

It was listed on the National Register of Historic Places in 1982.
