= King Lumber Company Warehouse =

Historic commercial building in Virginia, United States

- U.S. National Register of Historic Places
- Virginia Landmarks Register
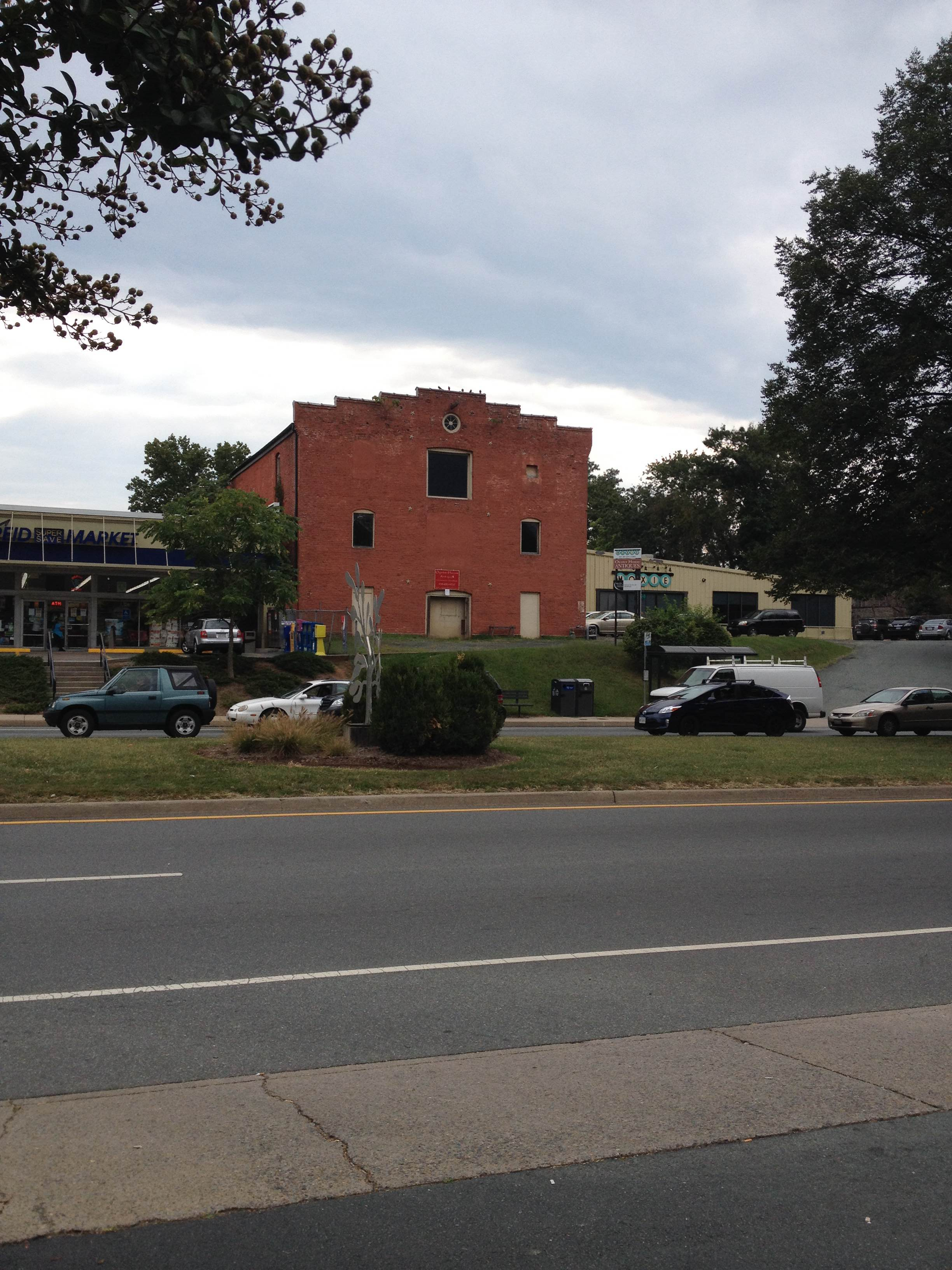

- Location within Virginia Location within the United States
- Location: 608 Preston Ave., Charlottesville, Virginia
- Coordinates: 38°2′5″N 78°29′11″W
- Area: 1.7 acres (0.69 ha)
- Built: 1909
- MPS: Charlottesville MRA
- NRHP reference No.: 83003269
- VLR No.: 104-0247

Significant dates
- Added to NRHP: August 10, 1983
- Designated VLR: October 20, 1981

King Lumber Company Warehouse is a historic warehouse building located at Charlottesville, Virginia. It was built in 1909, and is a three-bay, three bay by five bay brick building. It has a low gable roof with stepped gables and corbeled cornice stops. The King Lumber Company manufactured building materials that were used throughout the United States, including in many buildings at the University of Virginia. The company closed in the 1930s.

It was listed on the National Register of Historic Places in 1983.
