= Oakhurst–Gildersleeve Neighborhood Historic District =

Historic district in Virginia, United States

- U.S. National Register of Historic Places
- U.S. Historic district
- Virginia Landmarks Register
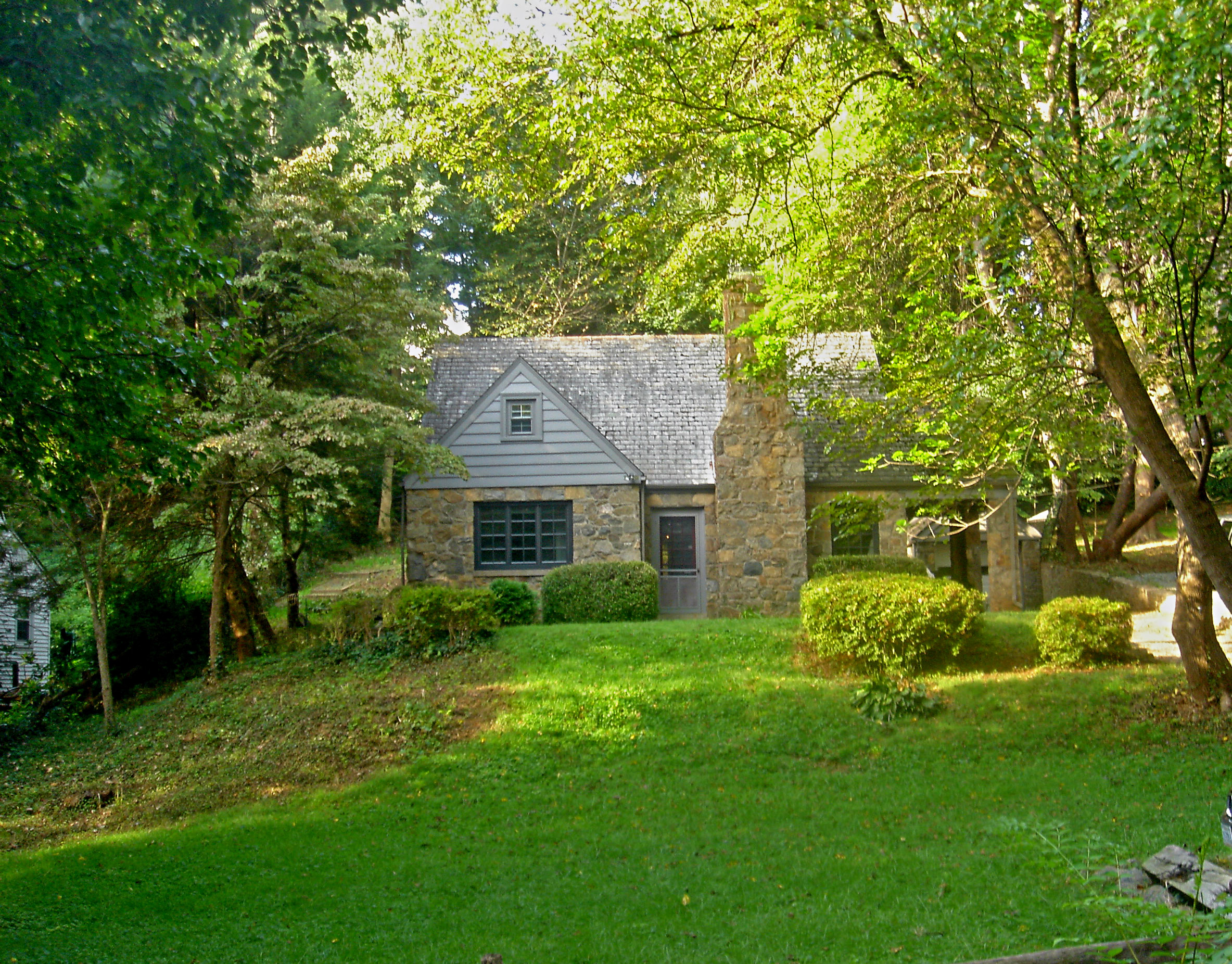
- 550 Valley Road

- Location within Virginia Location within the United States
- Location: Oakhurst Circle, Gildersleeve Wood, Valley Rd., Valley Circle, and part of Maywood Ln., and Jefferson Park Ave., Charlottesville, Virginia
- Coordinates: 38°1′54″N 78°30′24″W
- Area: 24.8 acres (10.0 ha)
- Built: 1915
- Architect: Bradbury, Eugene; et al.
- Architectural style: Tudor Revival, Bungalow/craftsman
- NRHP reference No.: 09000161
- VLR No.: 104-5092

Significant dates
- Added to NRHP: March 25, 2009
- Designated VLR: December 18, 2008

Oakhurst–Gildersleeve Neighborhood Historic District is a national historic district located at Charlottesville, Virginia. The district encompasses 78 contributing buildings in a primarily residential section of the city of Charlottesville. It was developed between 1910 and the 1960s and includes examples of the Bungalow, Colonial Revival, and Tudor Revival styles.

It was listed on the National Register of Historic Places in 2009.
