= Young Building =

Historic commercial building in Virginia, United States

- U.S. National Register of Historic Places
- Virginia Landmarks Register
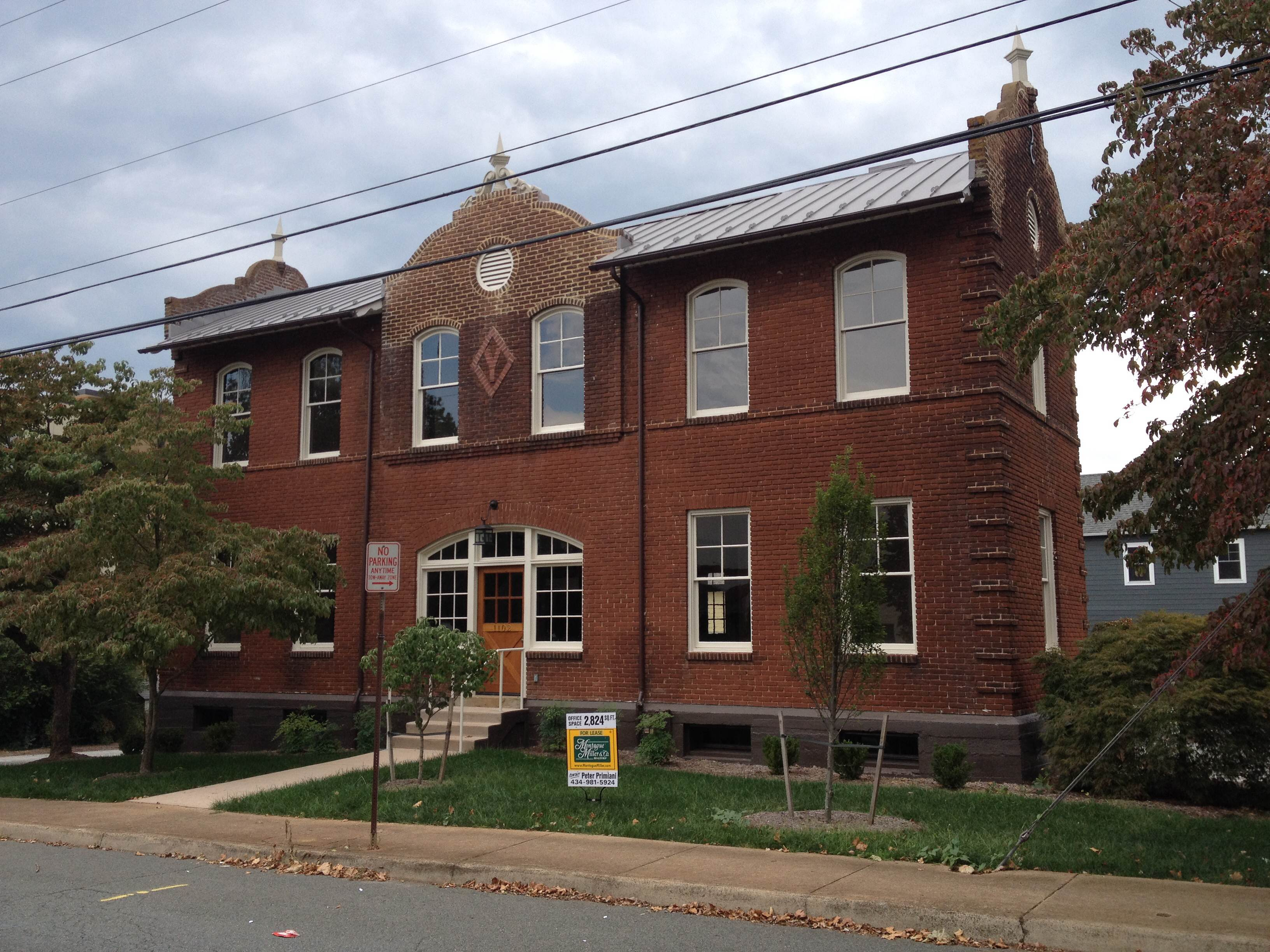

- Location within Virginia Location within the United States
- Location: 1102 Carlton Ave., Charlottesville, Virginia
- Coordinates: 38°1′15″N 78°28′3″W
- Area: 0 acres (0 ha)
- Built: 1916
- Architectural style: Jacobean Revival
- MPS: Charlottesville MRA
- NRHP reference No.: 82001817
- VLR No.: 104-0241

Significant dates
- Added to NRHP: October 21, 1982
- Designated VLR: October 20, 1981

Young Building is a historic office building located at Charlottesville, Virginia. It was built in 1916, and is a two-story, five-bay, single pile brick building in the Jacobean Revival style. It has a large rear wing. The main block has a medium-pitched gabled roof with deeply projecting eaves and decoratively shaped rafter ends. It was built to house the offices for the J. S. Young and Company sumac mill across the street. The building was adapted for residential use after 1939.

It was listed on the National Register of Historic Places in 1982.
