= Martha Jefferson Historic District =

Historic district in Virginia, United States

- U.S. National Register of Historic Places
- U.S. Historic district
- Virginia Landmarks Register
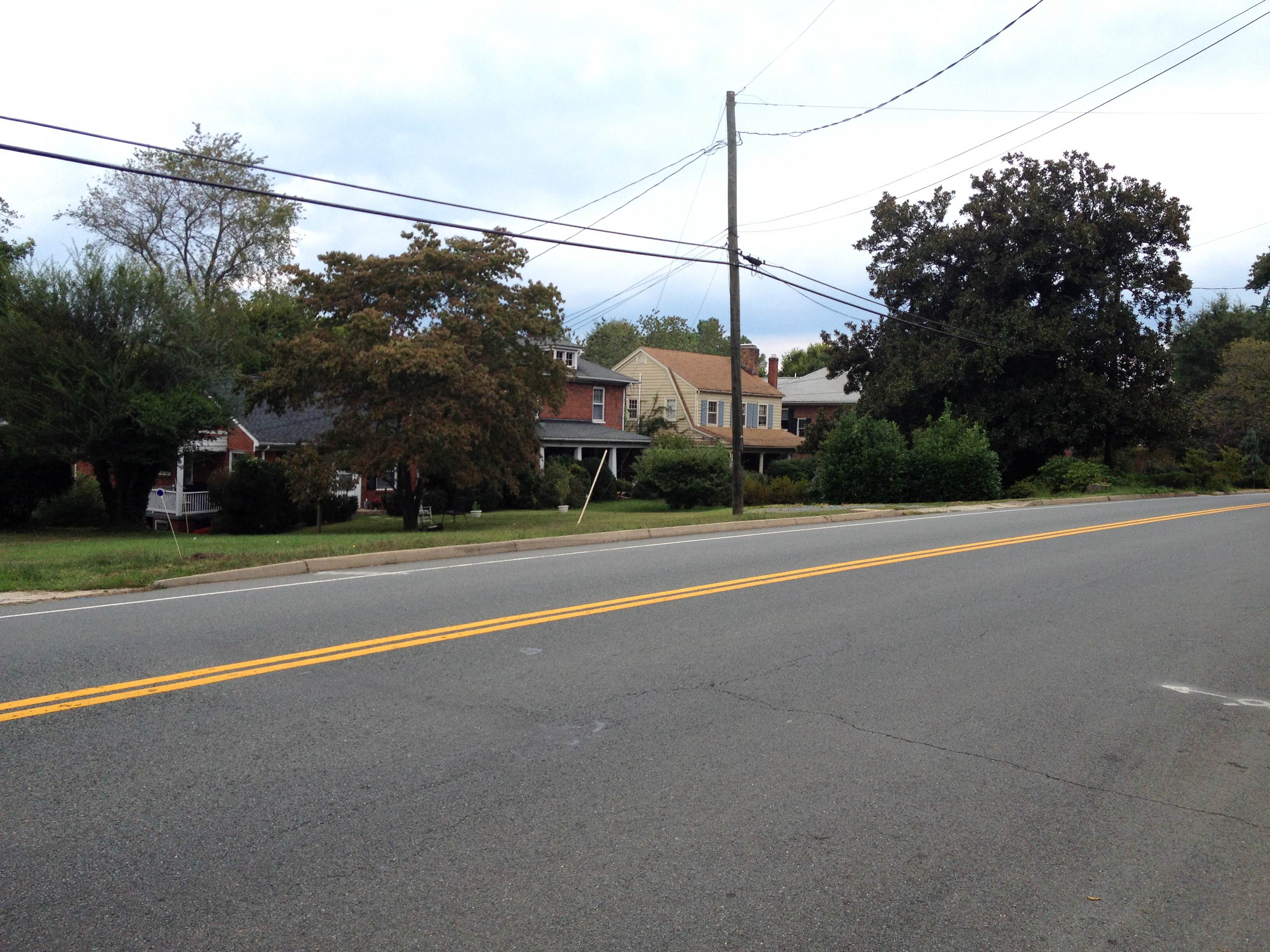

- Location within Virginia Location within the United States
- Location: Includes parts of Lexington, Locust & Grove Aves., & E. High, Maple, Sycamore, Poplar & Hazel Sts., Charlottesville, Virginia
- Coordinates: 38°02′02″N 78°28′08″W
- Area: 58.9 acres (23.8 ha)
- Built: 1827
- Built by: Locust Grove Investment Co.; et al.
- Architectural style: Late Victorian, Colonial Revival
- NRHP reference No.: 08000066
- VLR No.: 104-5144

Significant dates
- Added to NRHP: February 21, 2008
- Designated VLR: December 5, 2007

Martha Jefferson Historic District, also known as Locust Grove Addition, is a national historic district located at Charlottesville, Virginia. The district encompasses 154 contributing buildings, 1 contributing site (Maplewood Cemetery), and 1 contributing structure in a primarily residential section of the city of Charlottesville. It was developed between 1893 and 1957 and includes examples of the Late Victorian and Colonial Revival styles. Notable buildings include the Eddins-Tilden House (1901), Dorothy S. Marshall House (1941), and Martha Jefferson Hospital (1928-1929). Located in the district is the separately listed Locust Grove.

It was listed on the National Register of Historic Places in 2008.
