= Piereus Store =

Historic commercial building in Virginia, United States

- U.S. National Register of Historic Places
- Virginia Landmarks Register
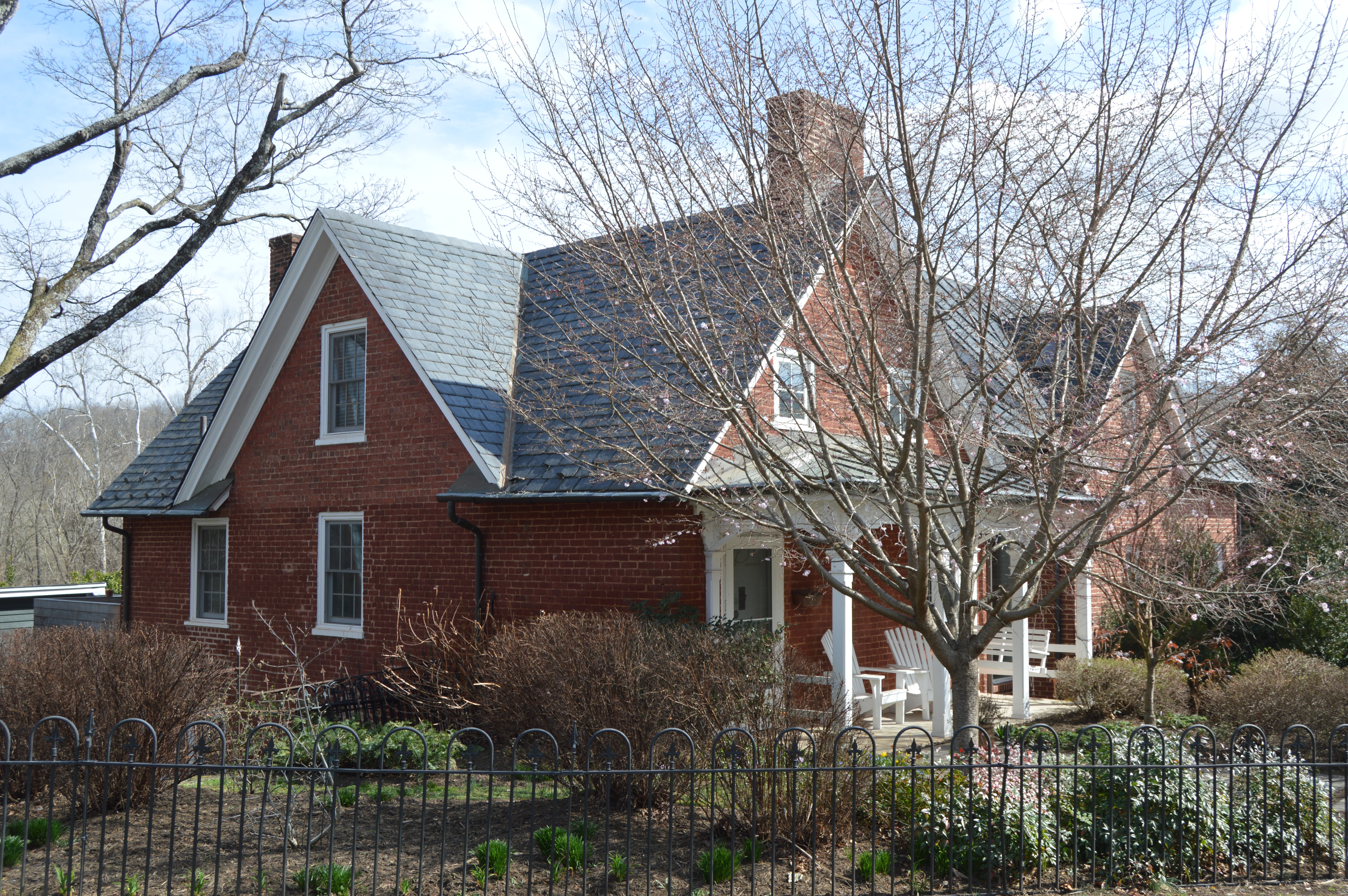
- Front and western end

- Location within Virginia Location within the United States
- Location: 1901 E. Market St., Charlottesville, Virginia
- Coordinates: 38°1′18″N 78°27′23″W
- Area: 0.4 acres (0.16 ha)
- Built: 1835-1840
- MPS: Charlottesville MRA
- NRHP reference No.: 83003272
- VLR No.: 104-5093

Significant dates
- Added to NRHP: August 10, 1983
- Designated VLR: October 20, 1981

Piereus Store is a historic commercial building located at Charlottesville, Virginia, USA. It was built between 1835 and 1840 and is a two-story, two-bay, brick building measuring two rooms deep. It has a gable roof and a single story Victorian front porch. It is one of two houses remaining from the "Piereus" phase of industrial development along the Rivanna River.

It was listed on the National Register of Historic Places in 1983.
