= Locust Grove (Charlottesville, Virginia) =

Historic house in Virginia, United States

- U.S. National Register of Historic Places
- Virginia Landmarks Register
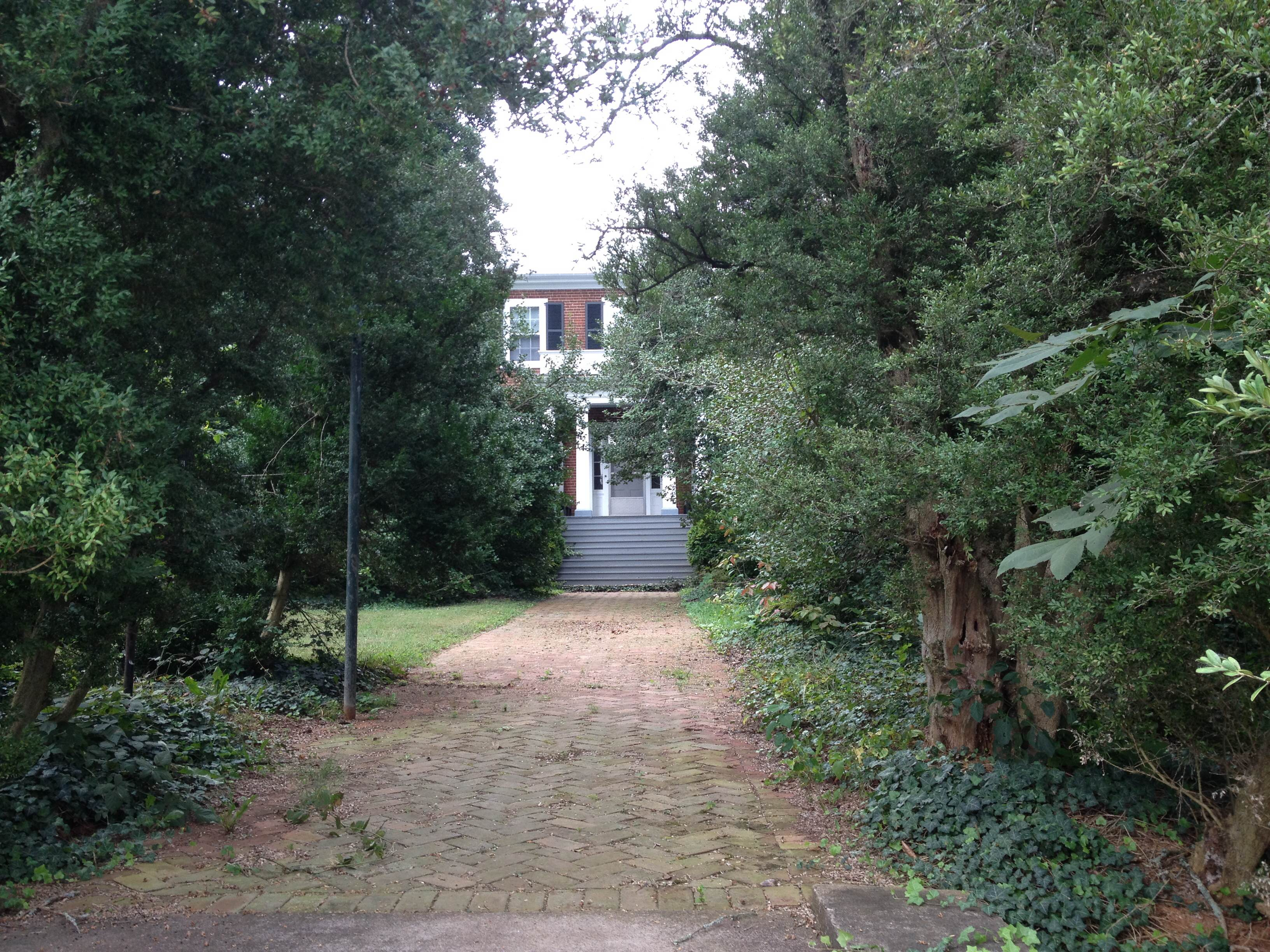

- Location within Virginia Location within the United States
- Location: 810 Locust Ave., Charlottesville, Virginia
- Coordinates: 38°02′08″N 78°28′05″W
- Area: less than one acre
- Built: 1840-1844
- Architectural style: Georgian
- MPS: Charlottesville MRA
- NRHP reference No.: 82001808
- VLR No.: 104-0005

Significant dates
- Added to NRHP: October 21, 1982
- Designated VLR: October 20, 1981

Locust Grove is a historic home located at Charlottesville, Virginia, United States. It was built between 1840 and 1844, and is a two-story, five-bay, Georgian style brick dwelling. It has a hipped roof and end chimneys. On the front facade is a portico with coupled paneled columns. Also on the property are a contributing original kitchen and smokehouse.

It was listed on the National Register of Historic Places in 1982. It is located in the Martha Jefferson Historic District.
