= Stonefield Beach State Recreation Site =

State park in Oregon, United States

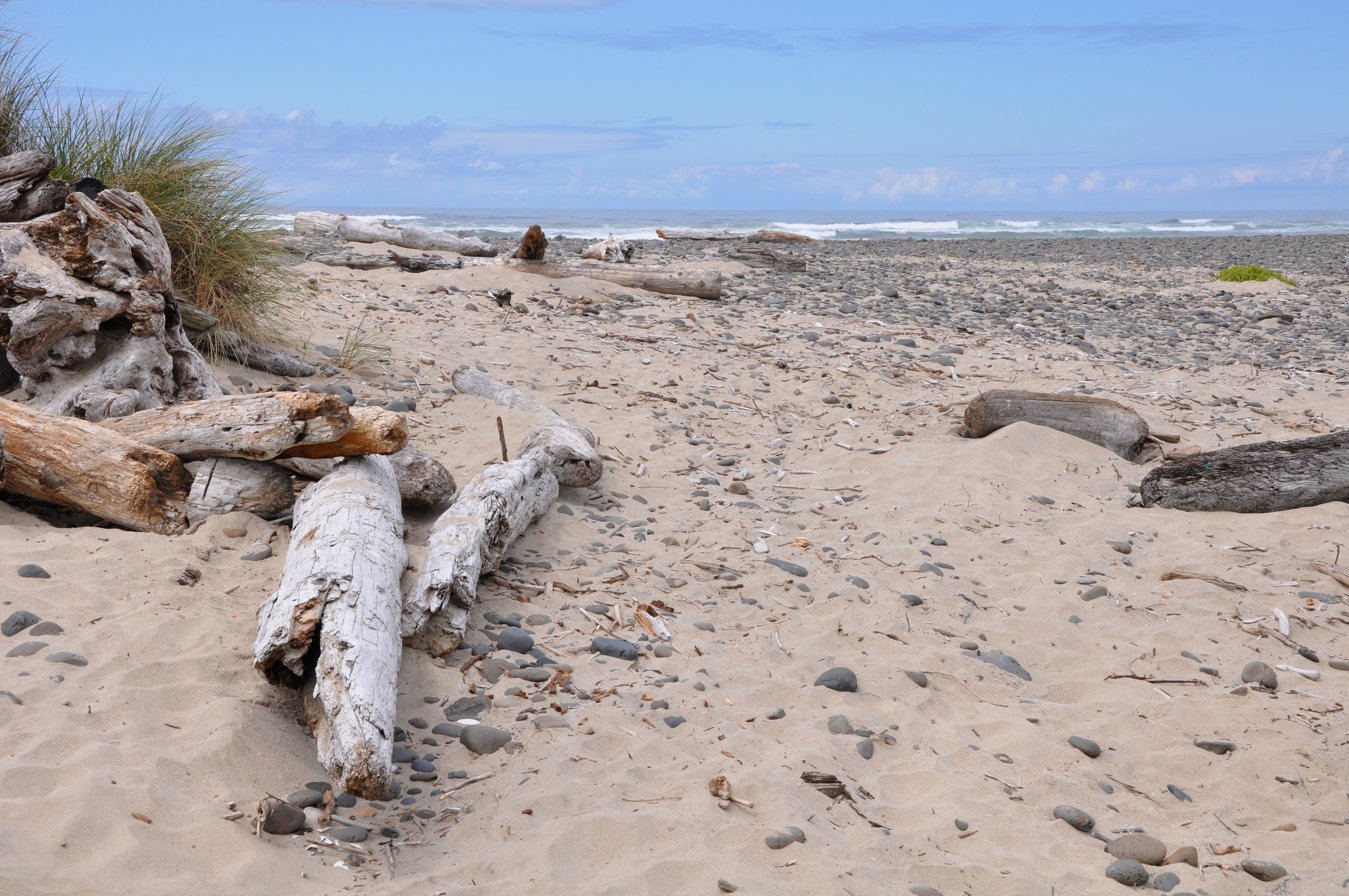
- View across the beach toward the Pacific Ocean

- Location within Oregon Location within the United States
- Type: Public, state
- Location: Lane County, Oregon
- Nearest city: Waldport
- Coordinates: 44.225°N 124.11055°W
- Elevation: 13 feet (4 m)
- Operator: Oregon Parks and Recreation Department

Stonefield Beach State Recreation Site is a state park in the U.S. state of Oregon, administered by the Oregon Parks and Recreation Department.

Tenmile Creek flows through the park and into the Pacific Ocean.

== See also ==
- List of Oregon state parks
