= Armstrong Knitting Factory =

Historic mill in Virginia, US

- U.S. National Register of Historic Places
- Virginia Landmarks Register
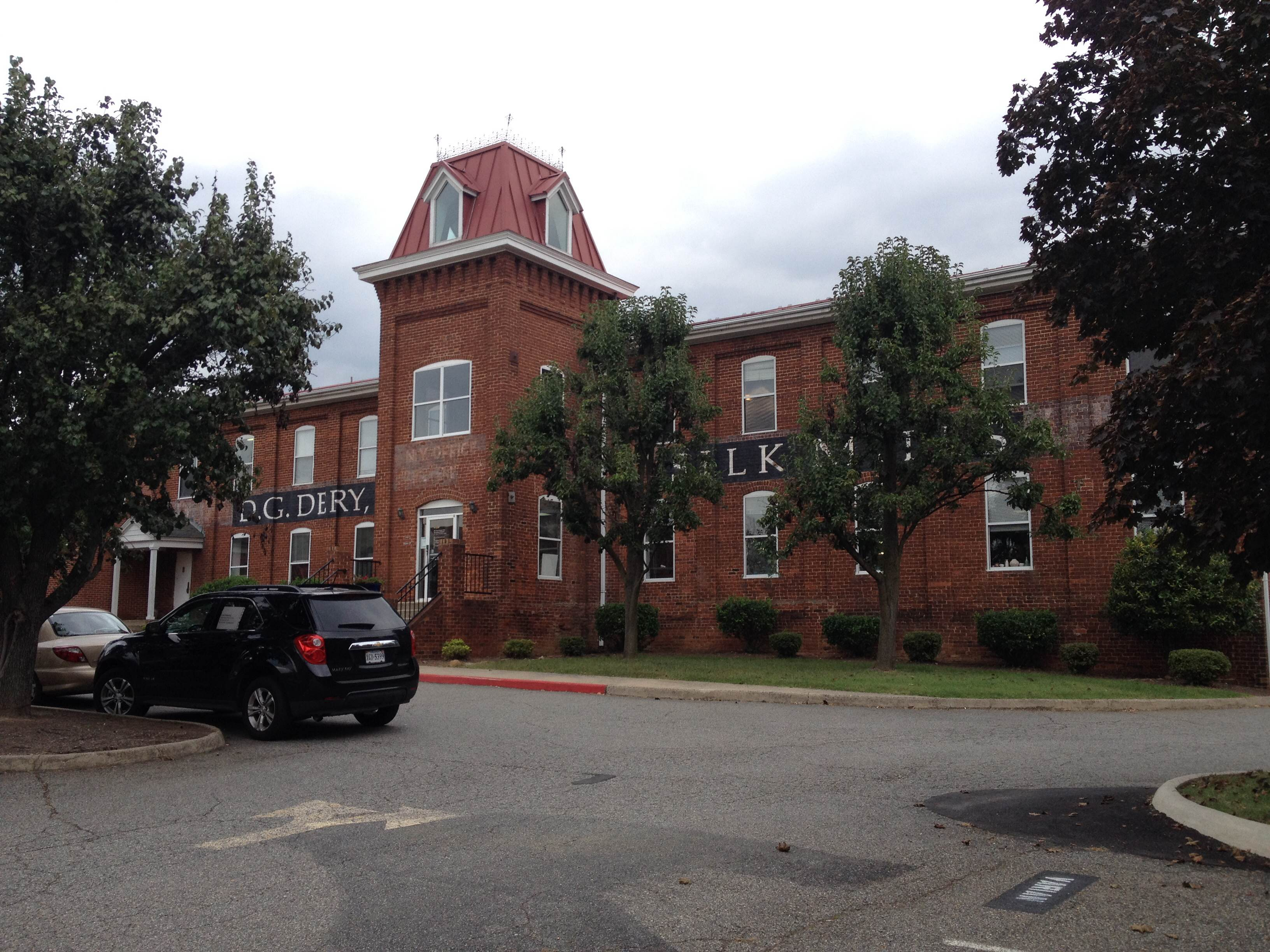

- Location within Virginia Location within the United States
- Location: 700 Harris St., Charlottesville, Virginia
- Coordinates: 38°2′8″N 78°29′4″W
- Area: 3.1 acres (1.3 ha)
- Built: 1889
- Architectural style: Second Empire
- MPS: Charlottesville MRA
- NRHP reference No.: 82001798
- VLR No.: 104-0242

Significant dates
- Added to NRHP: October 21, 1982
- Designated VLR: October 20, 1981

Armstrong Knitting Factory is a historic silk mill located at Charlottesville, Virginia. It was built in 1889, and is a two-story, 11 bay, rectangular brick building with a low hipped roof. It has a central entrance tower with a mansard roof in the Second Empire style.

It was listed on the National Register of Historic Places in 1982.
