= Wertland Street Historic District =

Historic district in Virginia, United States

- U.S. National Register of Historic Places
- U.S. Historic district
- Virginia Landmarks Register
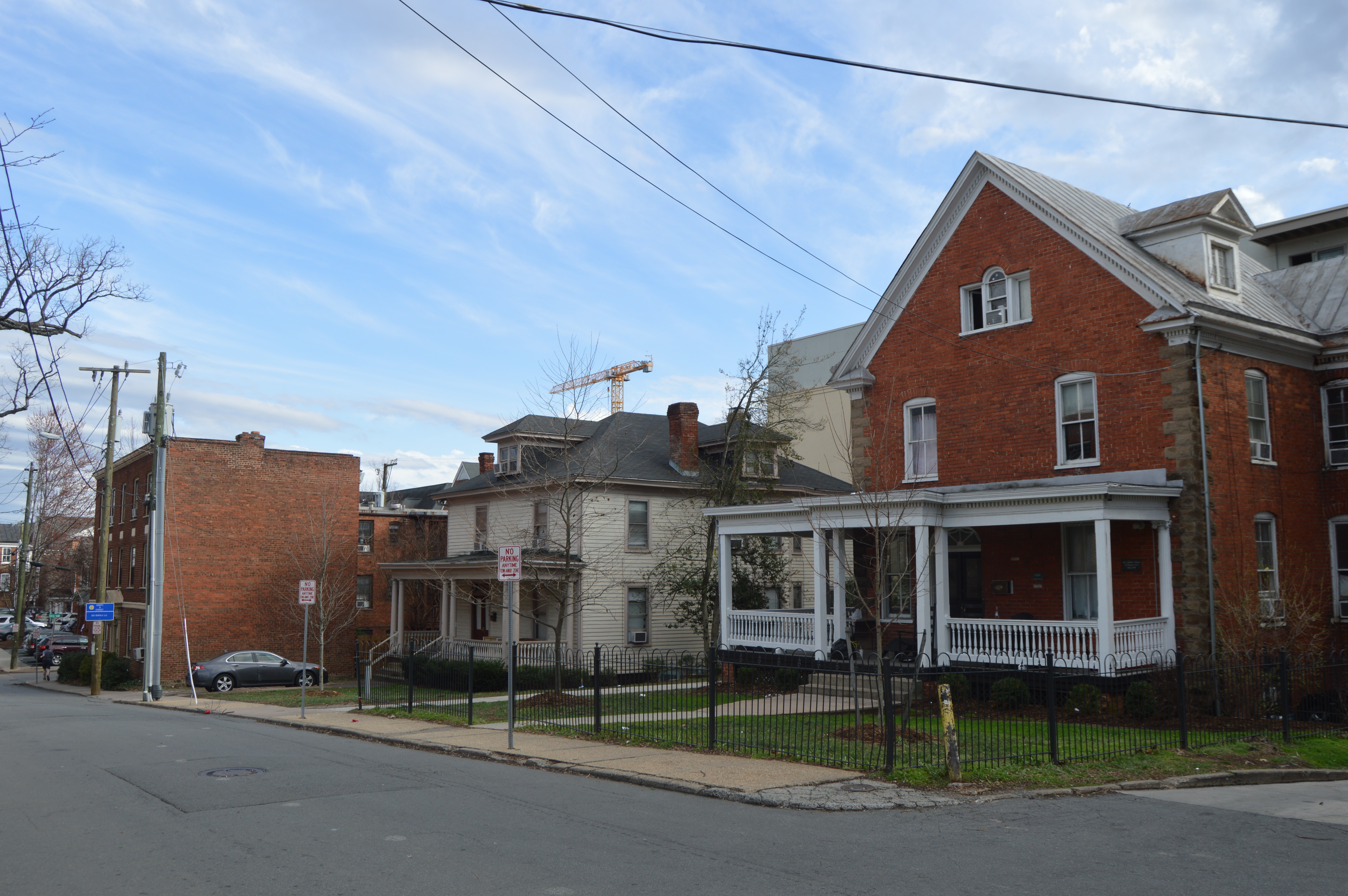
- Looking east on Wertland from Fourteenth

- Location within Virginia Location within the United States
- Location: Wertland St. between 10th and 14th Sts., Charlottesville, Virginia
- Coordinates: 38°2′4″N 78°29′48″W
- Area: 47 acres (19 ha)
- Architect: Multiple
- Architectural style: Late 19th And 20th Century Revivals, Late Victorian, Vernacular Victorian
- MPS: Charlottesville MRA
- NRHP reference No.: 85000298
- VLR No.: 104-0136

Significant dates
- Added to NRHP: February 14, 1985
- Designated VLR: December 11, 1984

Wertland Street Historic District is a national historic district located at Charlottesville, Virginia. The district encompasses 25 contributing buildings in a two block residential section of the city of Charlottesville. It was primarily developed starting in the 1880s. Notable buildings include the Wertenbaker House (c. 1830), McKennie-Miller House (c. 1842), Ward-Brown-Gay House (1889), Marshall-Dabney-Cubbage House (1892), Bryan-Stallings House (1900), and Watson House (1905).

It was listed on the National Register of Historic Places in 1985.
