= John Vowles House =

Historic house in Virginia, United States

- U.S. National Register of Historic Places
- Virginia Landmarks Register
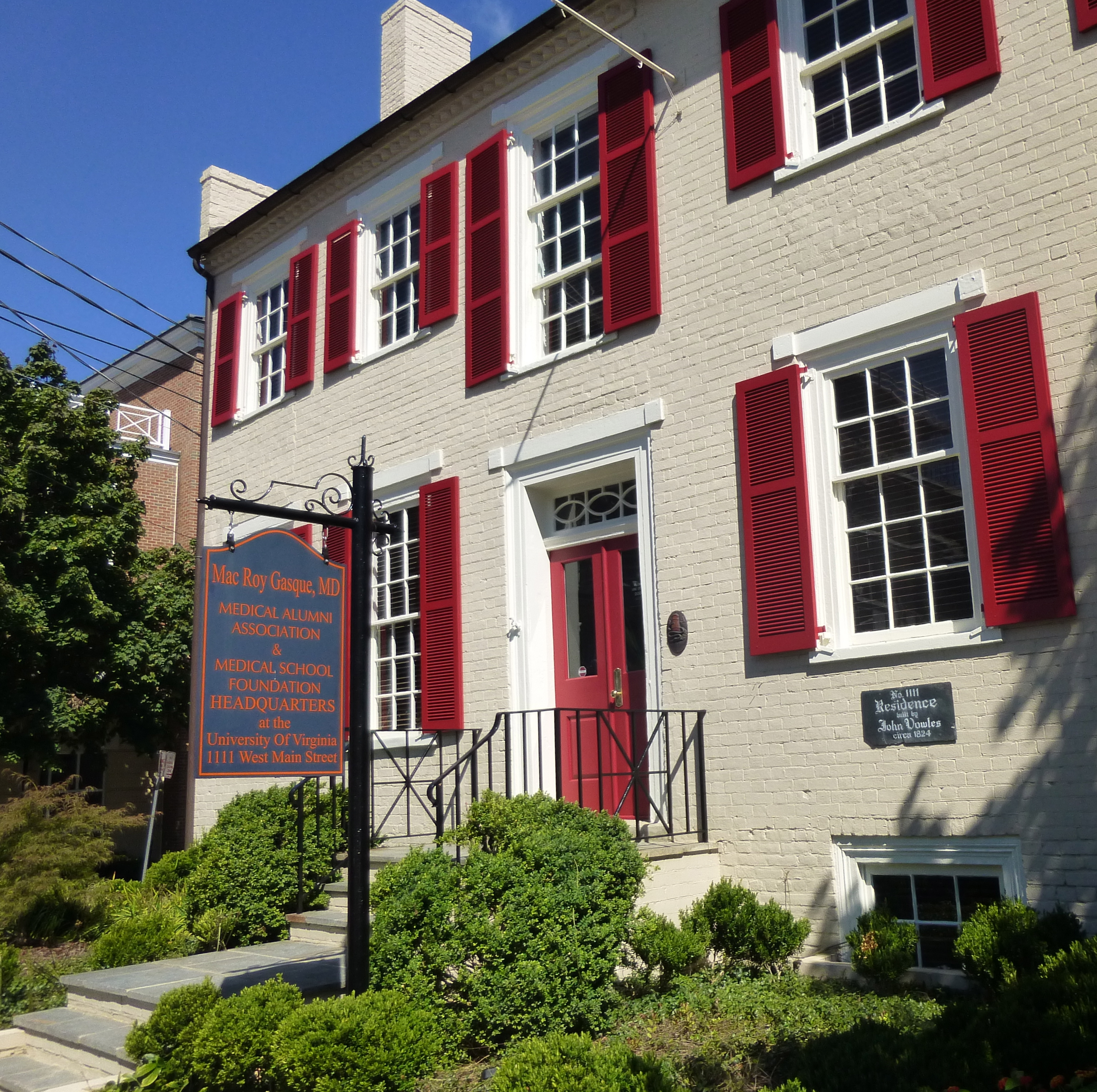
- John Vowles House, September 2012

- Location within Virginia Location within the United States
- Location: 1111-1113 W. Main St., Charlottesville, Virginia
- Coordinates: 38°2′0″N 78°29′49″W
- Area: less than one acre
- Built: 1824
- Built by: Dinsmore, James
- Architectural style: Federal
- NRHP reference No.: 89001928
- VLR No.: 104-0040

Significant dates
- Added to NRHP: November 2, 1989
- Designated VLR: October 18, 1988

John Vowles House is two adjoined historic homes located at Charlottesville, Virginia.

== Overview ==
It was built in 1824, and consists of two two-story, three-bay, gable-roofed Federal style brick town houses. Both houses feature decorative cornices and original interior woodwork. To the rear of 1113 West Main is a small 1 1/2-story, L-shaped, gable-roofed brick outbuilding built as a kitchen and added in the 1920s.

It was listed on the National Register of Historic Places in 1989.
