= Patton Mansion =

Historic house in Virginia, United States

- U.S. National Register of Historic Places
- Virginia Landmarks Register
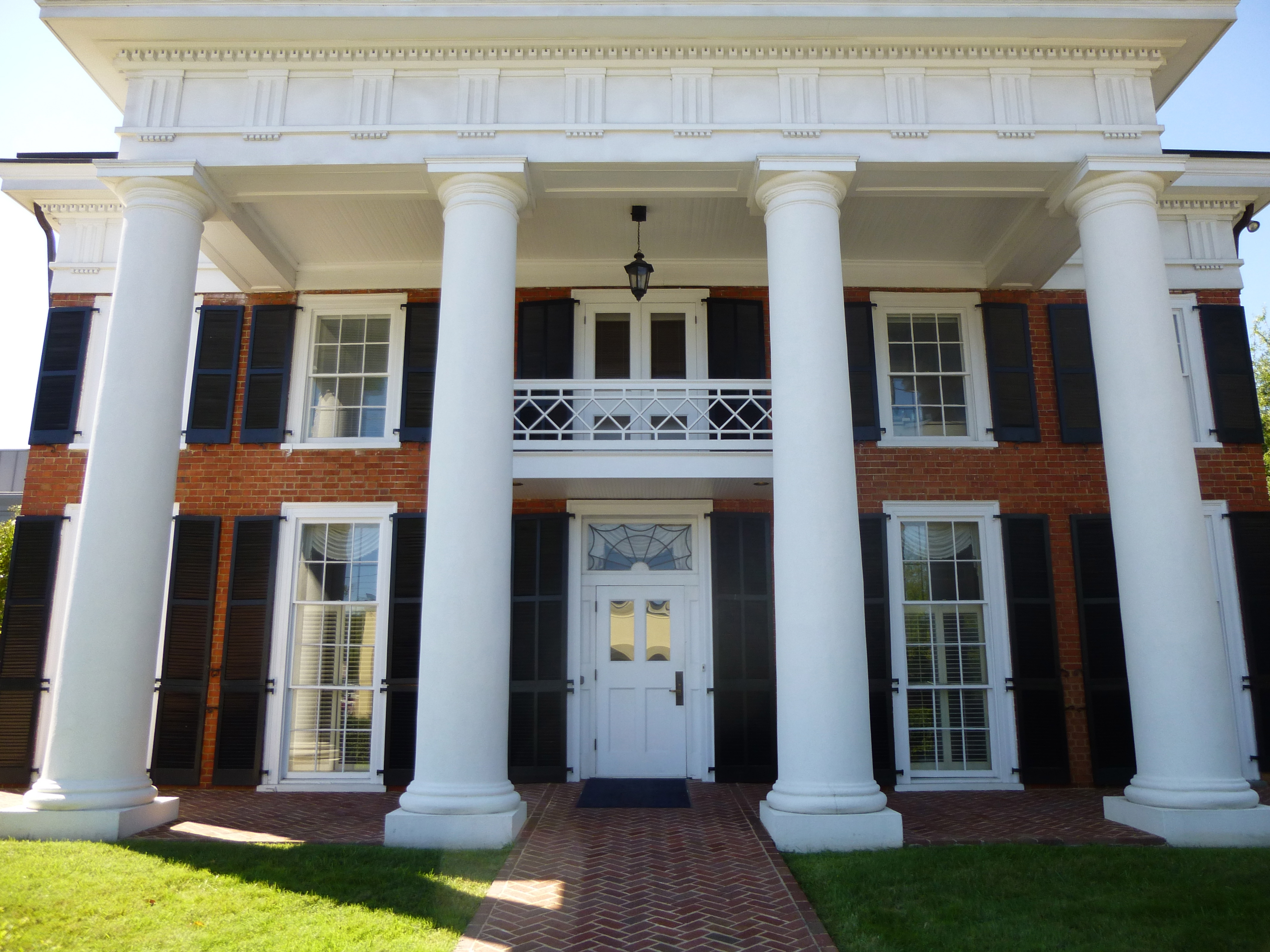

- Location within Virginia Location within the United States
- Location: 1018 W. Main St., Charlottesville, Virginia
- Coordinates: 38°1′56″N 78°29′45″W
- Area: less than one acre
- Built: 1907
- Architectural style: Jeffersonian Revival
- MPS: Charlottesville MRA
- NRHP reference No.: 82001809
- VLR No.: 104-0249

Significant dates
- Added to NRHP: October 21, 1982
- Designated VLR: October 20, 1981

Patton Mansion is a historic home located at Charlottesville, Virginia. It was built in 1907, and is a two-story, five-bay, double pile, Jeffersonian Revival Style brick dwelling. It has a hip roof and a full-height Tuscan order portico covering the center three bays of the front façade. There is a small hanging balcony with Chinese Chippendale baluster above the entrance.

It was listed on the National Register of Historic Places in 1982.
