= White Cross–Huntley Hall =

Historic house in Virginia, United States

- U.S. National Register of Historic Places
- U.S. Historic district – Contributing property
- Virginia Landmarks Register
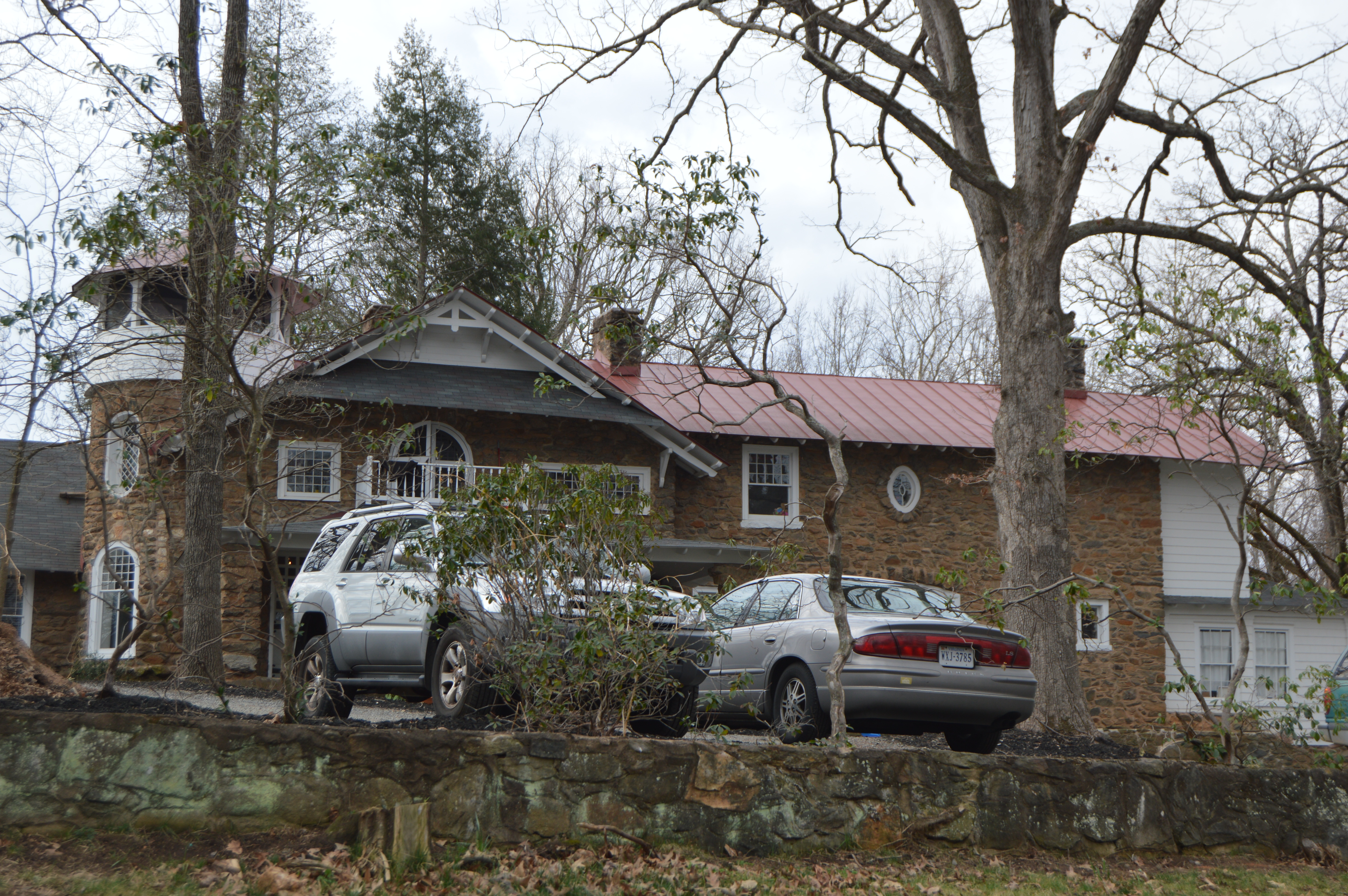
- Front of the house

- Location within Virginia Location within the United States
- Location: 152 Stribling Ave., Charlottesville, Virginia
- Coordinates: 38°1′19″N 78°31′8″W
- Area: 2 acres (0.81 ha)
- Built: 1891
- Architectural style: Shingle Style
- Part of: Fry's Spring Historic District (ID14000944)
- MPS: Charlottesville MRA
- NRHP reference No.: 82001814
- VLR No.: 104-0236

Significant dates
- Added to NRHP: October 21, 1982
- Designated CP: November 19, 2014
- Designated VLR: October 20, 1981

White Cross–Huntley Hall is a historic home located at Charlottesville, Virginia. It was built in 1891, and is a two-story Shingle Style dwelling. It features stone walls, broad expanses of hipped and gable rooflines, circular tower, and small-paned windows. The Charlottesville School for Boys occupied the house for over a decade in the 1930s-1940s.

It was listed on the National Register of Historic Places in 1982.
