= Woolen Mills Chapel =

Historic chapel in Virginia, United States

- U.S. National Register of Historic Places
- U.S. Historic district – Contributing property
- Virginia Landmarks Register
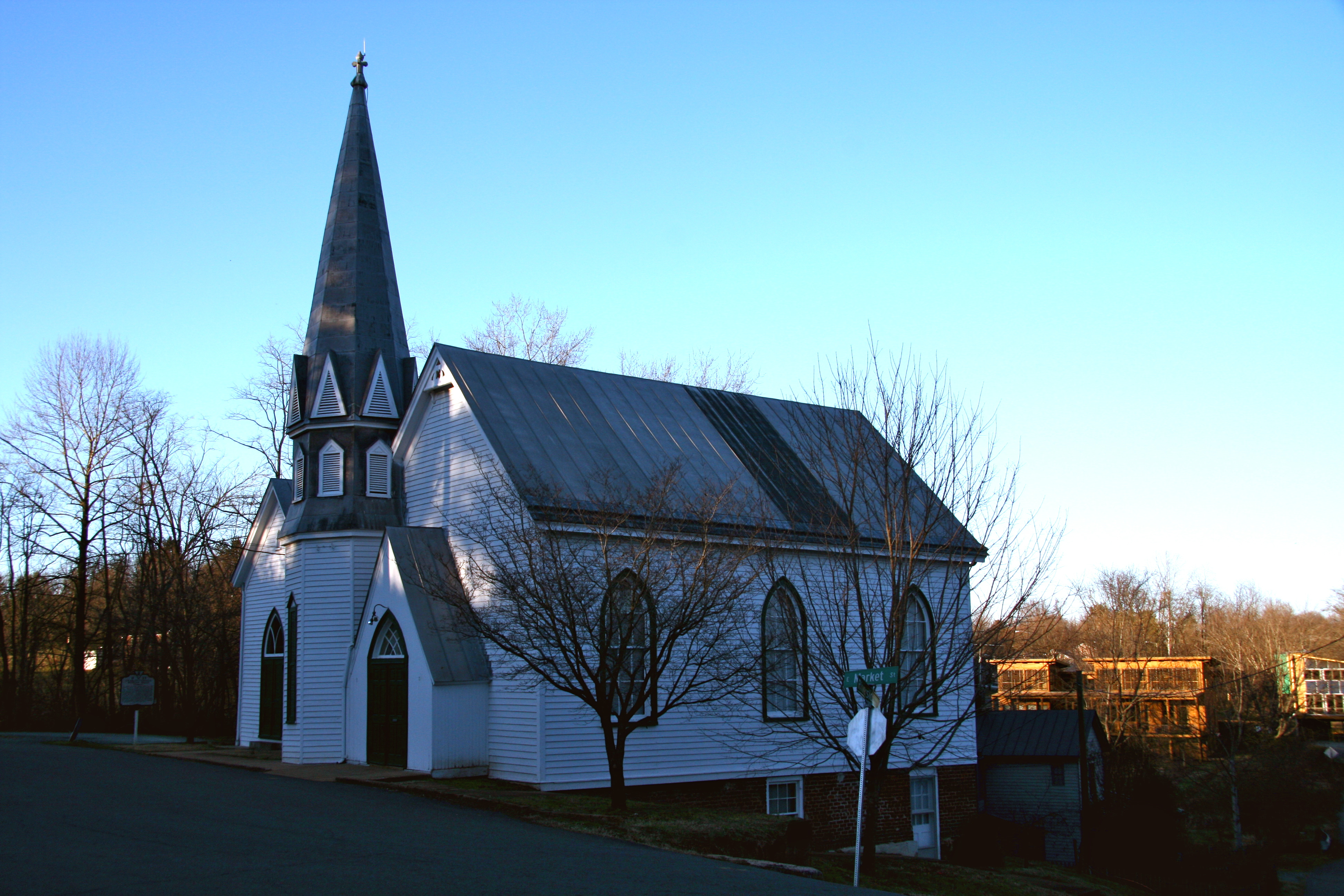

- Location within Virginia Location within the United States
- Location: 1819 E. Market St., Charlottesville, Virginia
- Coordinates: 38°1′18″N 78°27′24″W
- Area: less than one acre
- Built: 1887
- Architectural style: Late Victorian
- Part of: Woolen Mills Village Historic District (ID10000196)
- MPS: Charlottesville MRA
- NRHP reference No.: 82001815
- VLR No.: 104-0237

Significant dates
- Added to NRHP: October 21, 1982
- Designated CP: April 12, 2010
- Designated VLR: October 20, 1982

Woolen Mills Chapel is a historic chapel located at 1819 E. Market Street in Charlottesville, Virginia. The Late Victorian building was constructed in 1887.

It was listed on the National Register of Historic Places in 1982, and included in the Woolen Mills Village Historic District in 2010.
