= Sunnyside (Charlottesville, Virginia) =

Historic house in Virginia, United States

- U.S. National Register of Historic Places
- Virginia Landmarks Register
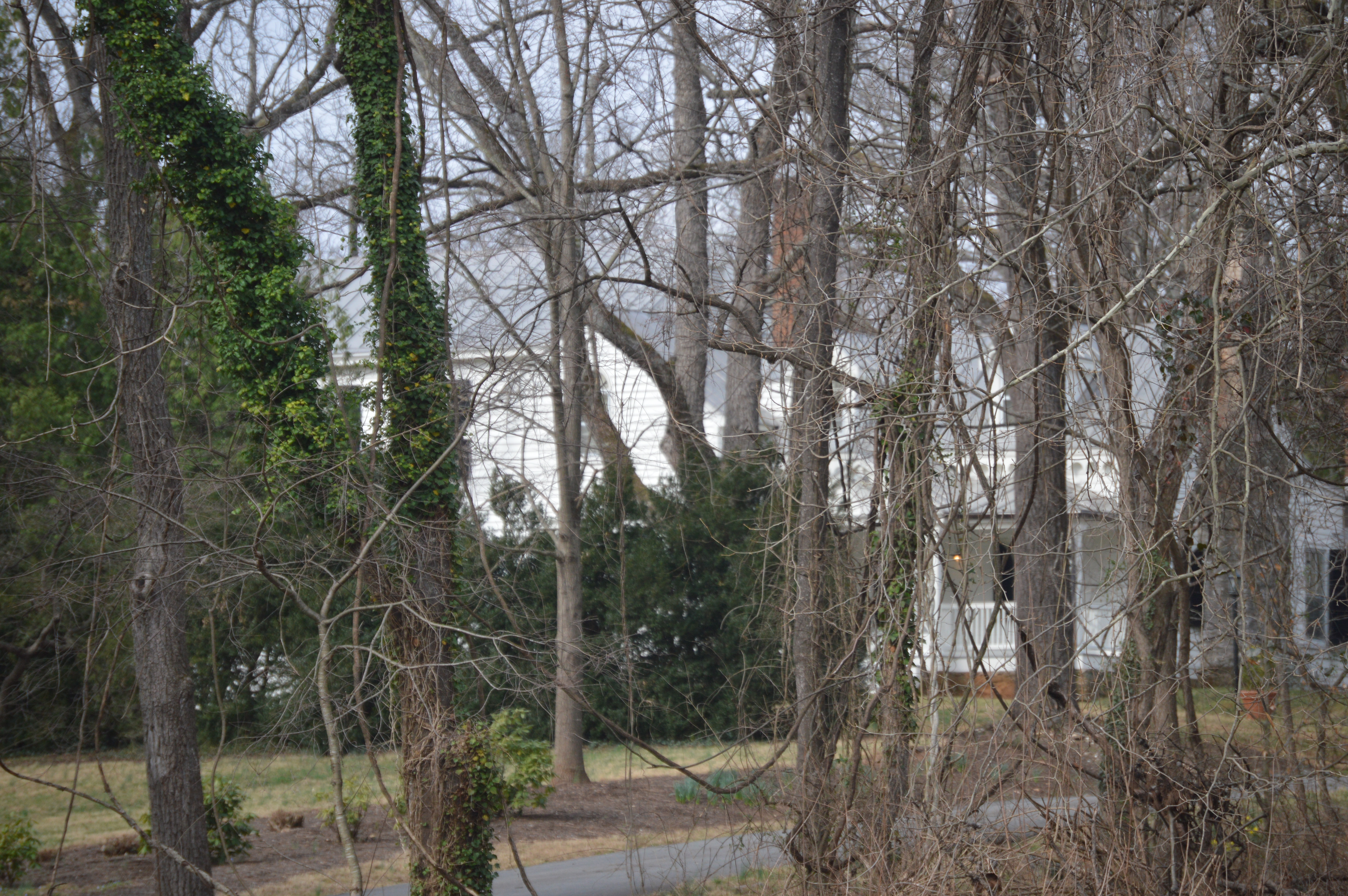
- Front, seen through trees

- Location within Virginia Location within the United States
- Location: 2150 Barracks Rd., Charlottesville, Virginia
- Coordinates: 38°3′21″N 78°30′14″W
- Area: 2 acres (0.81 ha)
- Built: c. 1800, 1858
- Architectural style: Gothic Revival
- NRHP reference No.: 03001086
- VLR No.: 104-0006

Significant dates
- Added to NRHP: October 23, 2003
- Designated VLR: June 18, 2003

Sunnyside, also known as the Duke House, is a historic home located at Charlottesville, Virginia. The original section was built about 1800, as a 1 1/2-story, two room log dwelling. It was expanded and remodeled in 1858, as a Gothic Revival style dwelling after Washington Irving's Gothic Revival home, also called Sunnyside. The house features scroll-sawn bargeboards, arched windows and doors, and a fieldstone chimney with stepped weatherings and capped corbelled stacks topped with two octagonal chimney pots.

The house was built by John Altphin around 1800 in the rural outskirts of Charlottesville, which was only incorporated as a town of less than 300 people in 1801. The house passed through multiple owners before its major transformation in the 1850s. The longest-tenured owners of the property were the Duke family, after Confederate officer Richard Thomas Walker Duke purchased the property in 1863. Duke's descendants continued to live at Sunnyside until the University of Virginia acquired the property in 1963.

It was listed on the National Register of Historic Places in 2003.
