= Enderly =

Historic house in Virginia, United States

- U.S. National Register of Historic Places
- Virginia Landmarks Register
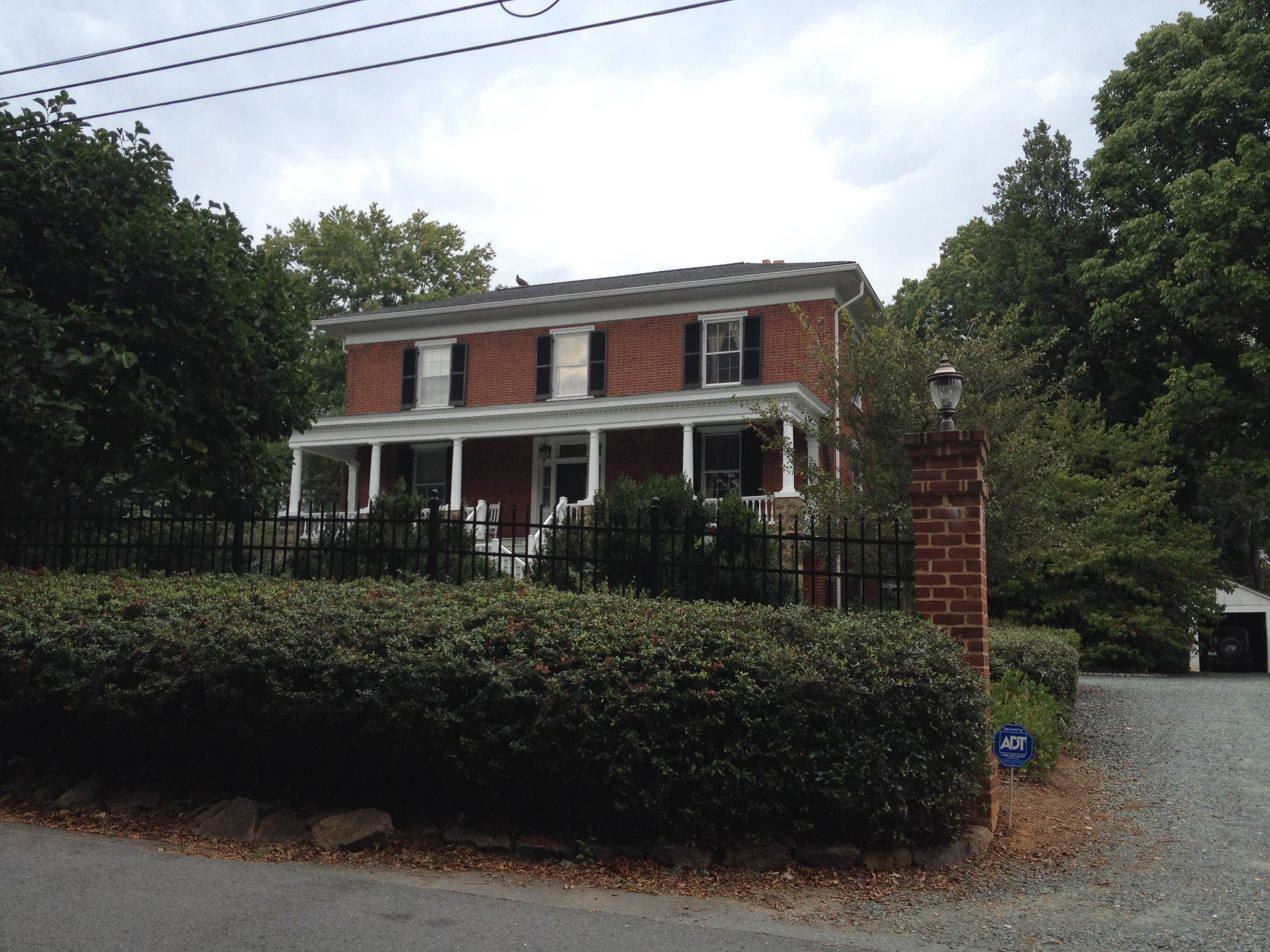

- Location within Virginia Location within the United States
- Location: 603 Watson Ave., Charlottesville, Virginia
- Coordinates: 38°2′27″N 78°28′16″W
- Area: less than one acre
- Built: 1859-1860
- Architectural style: Greek Revival, Colonial Revival
- MPS: Charlottesville MRA
- NRHP reference No.: 82001803
- VLR No.: 104-0202

Significant dates
- Added to NRHP: October 21, 1982
- Designated VLR: October 20, 1981

Enderly is a historic home located at Charlottesville, Virginia. It was built in 1859–1860, and is a two-story, three-bay, Greek Revival style brick dwelling. It has an original one-story rear wing, later expanded to two stories in the 20th century. A single-story Colonial Revival front porch replaced the original portico.

It was listed on the National Register of Historic Places in 1982.

Located at 605 Watson Avenue, adjacent to the Enderly House, is the Enderly kitchen. The kitchen was built in 1858 and prepared all of the meals for the Enderlys. Originally just a two room kitchen, the front 2 over 2 was added during World War I. In 1986, an additional first floor BR suite was added that enlarged the home even more.
