= Turner–LaRowe House =

Historic house in Virginia, United States

- U.S. National Register of Historic Places
- Virginia Landmarks Register
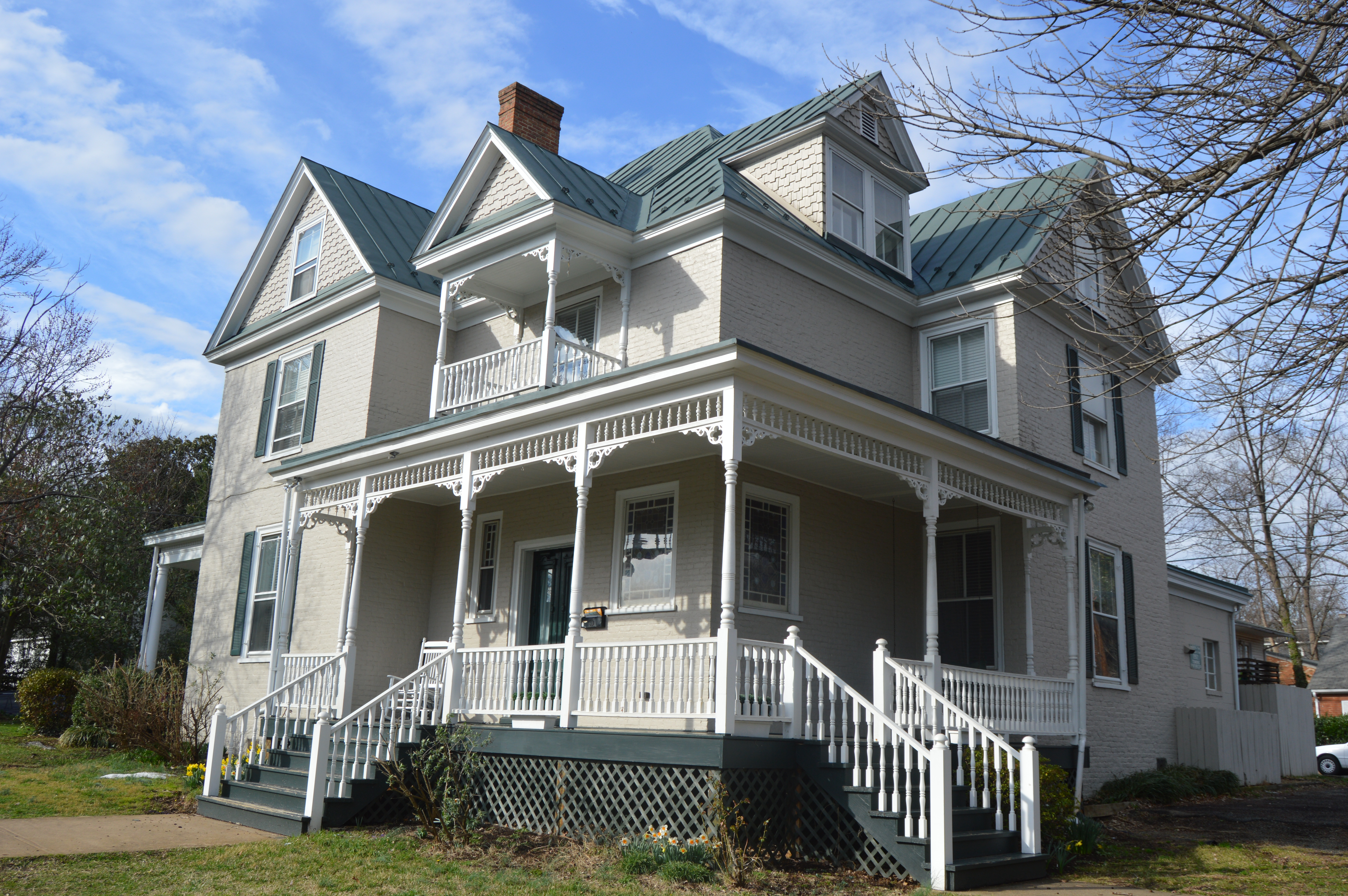
- Front and eastern side

- Location within Virginia Location within the United States
- Location: 1 University Court, Charlottesville, Virginia
- Coordinates: 38°2′16″N 78°29′55″W
- Area: 0.3 acres (0.12 ha)
- Built: 1892
- Architectural style: Late Victorian, Victorian
- MPS: Charlottesville MRA
- NRHP reference No.: 83003275
- VLR No.: 104-0234

Significant dates
- Added to NRHP: August 10, 1983
- Designated VLR: October 20, 1981

Turner–LaRowe House is a historic home located at Charlottesville, Virginia. It was built in 1892, and is a two-story, Late Victorian style dwelling. It features two one-story verandahs with a low-pitched hipped roofs, spindle frieze, and bracketed Eastlake movement posts and balustrade. A small second-story porch above the.entrance has a matching balustrade and a pedimented gable roof.

It was listed on the National Register of Historic Places in 1983.
