= House at Pireus =

Historic house in Virginia, United States

- U.S. National Register of Historic Places
- Virginia Landmarks Register
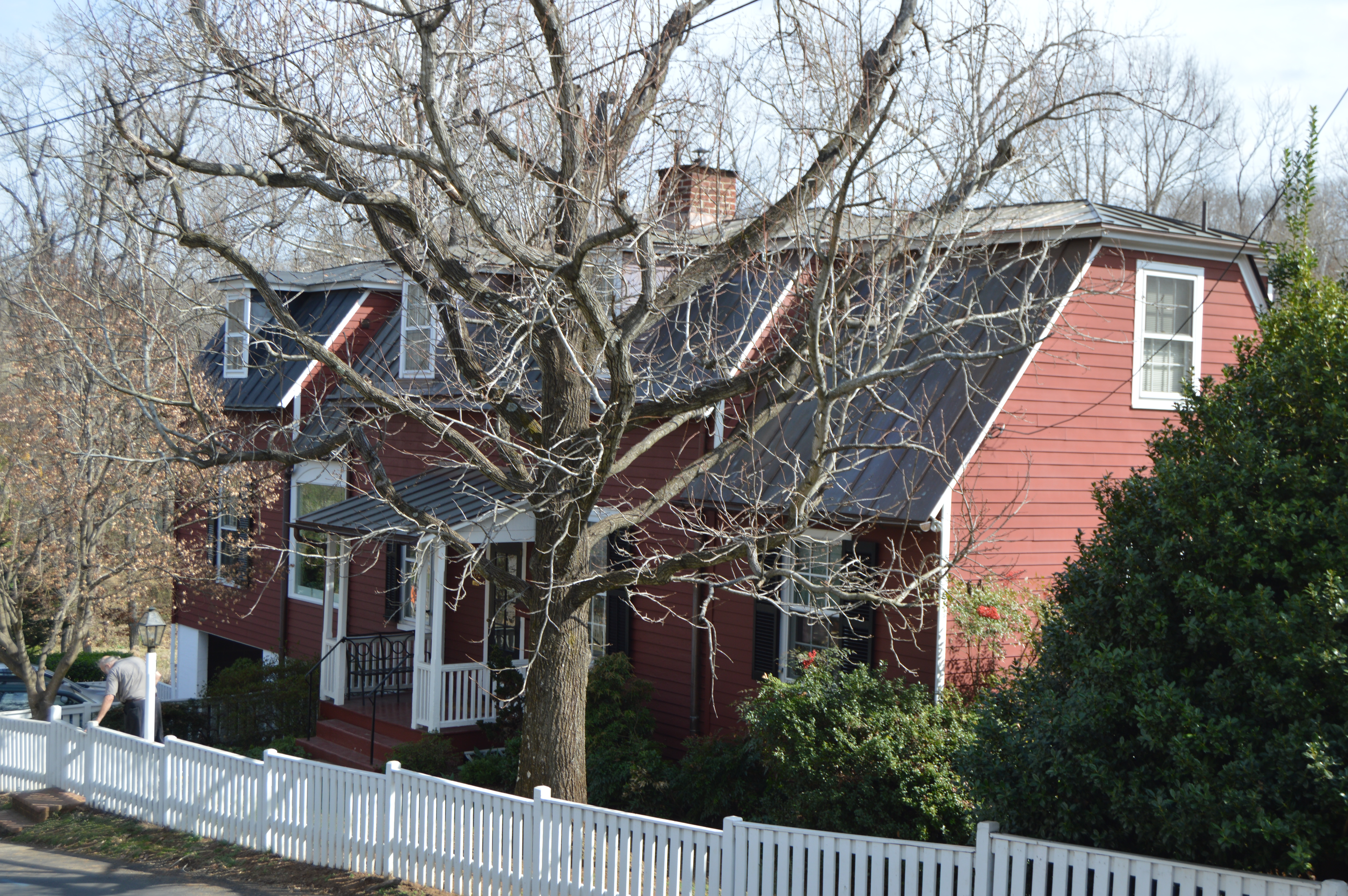
- Front and southern end

- Location within Virginia Location within the United States
- Location: 302 Riverside Ave., Charlottesville, Virginia
- Coordinates: 38°1′18″N 78°27′22″W
- Area: Less than 1 acre (0.40 ha)
- Built: c. 1830
- MPS: Charlottesville MRA
- NRHP reference No.: 83003268
- VLR No.: 104-0384

Significant dates
- Added to NRHP: August 10, 1983
- Designated VLR: October 20, 1981

House at Pireus is a historic home located at Charlottesville, Virginia. It was built about 1830, and is a small 1 1/2-story, two-bay, vernacular cottage. It sits on a full basement and has a hipped gambrel roof of standing seam metal. The house has a central stone and brick chimney. It was probably moved to its present location during the last quarter of the 19th century.

It was listed on the National Register of Historic Places in 1983.
