= Robert L. Updike House =

Historic house in Virginia, United States

- U.S. National Register of Historic Places
- Virginia Landmarks Register
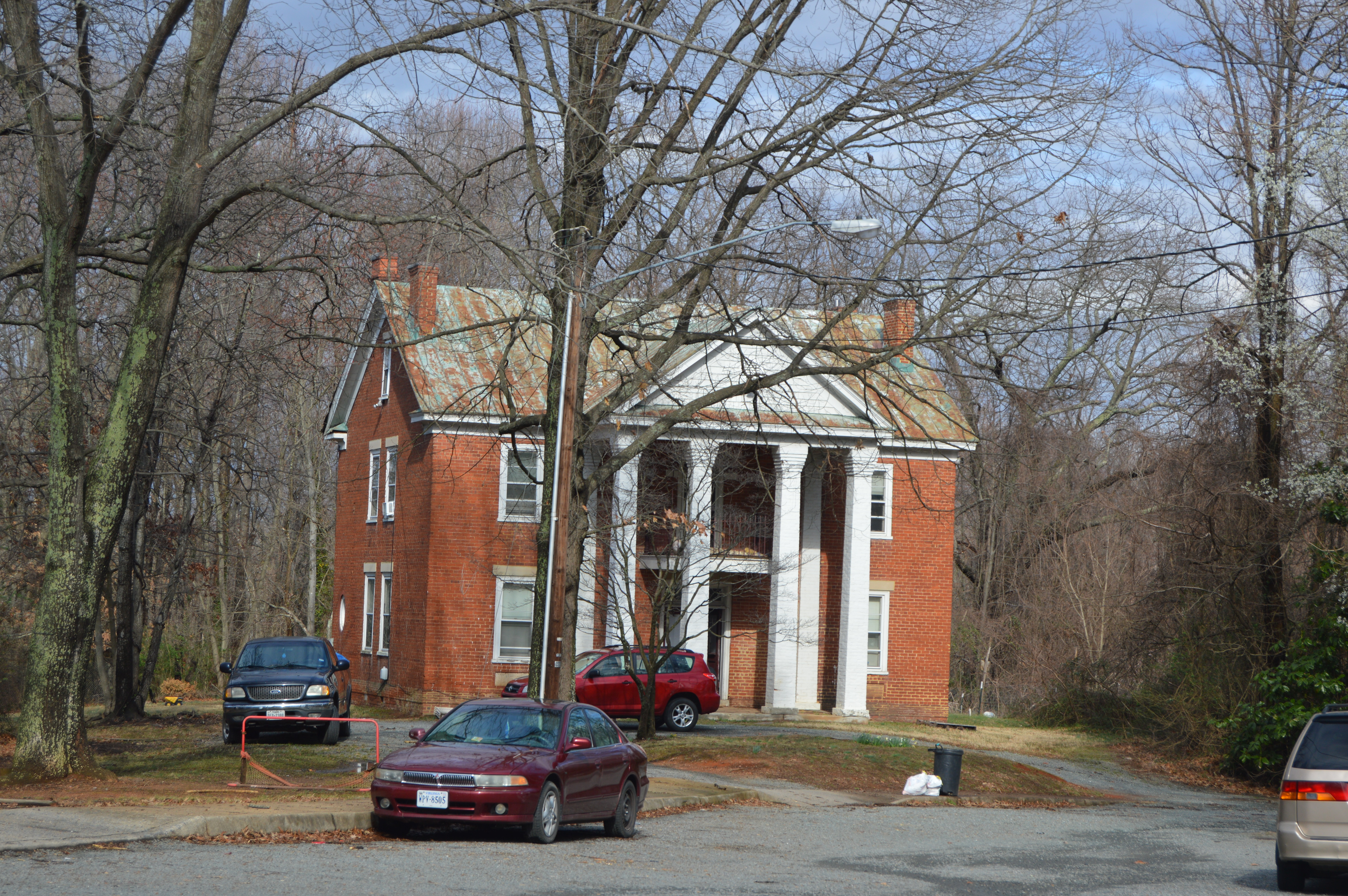
- Front and western end

- Location within Virginia Location within the United States
- Location: 620 Prospect Ave., Charlottesville, Virginia
- Coordinates: 38°1′28″N 78°29′40″W
- Area: Less than 1 acre (0.40 ha)
- Built: 1904
- Architectural style: Colonial Revival
- MPS: Charlottesville MRA
- NRHP reference No.: 83003276
- VLR No.: 104-0235

Significant dates
- Added to NRHP: August 10, 1983
- Designated VLR: October 20, 1981

Robert L. Updike House is a historic home located at Charlottesville, Virginia. It was built in 1904, and is a two-story, three-bay, vernacular Colonial Revival style brick dwelling. It has a steep gable roof and features a full height portico on the front facade.

It was listed on the National Register of Historic Places in 1983.
