= Ridge Street Historic District =

Historic district in Virginia, United States

- U.S. National Register of Historic Places
- U.S. Historic district
- Virginia Landmarks Register
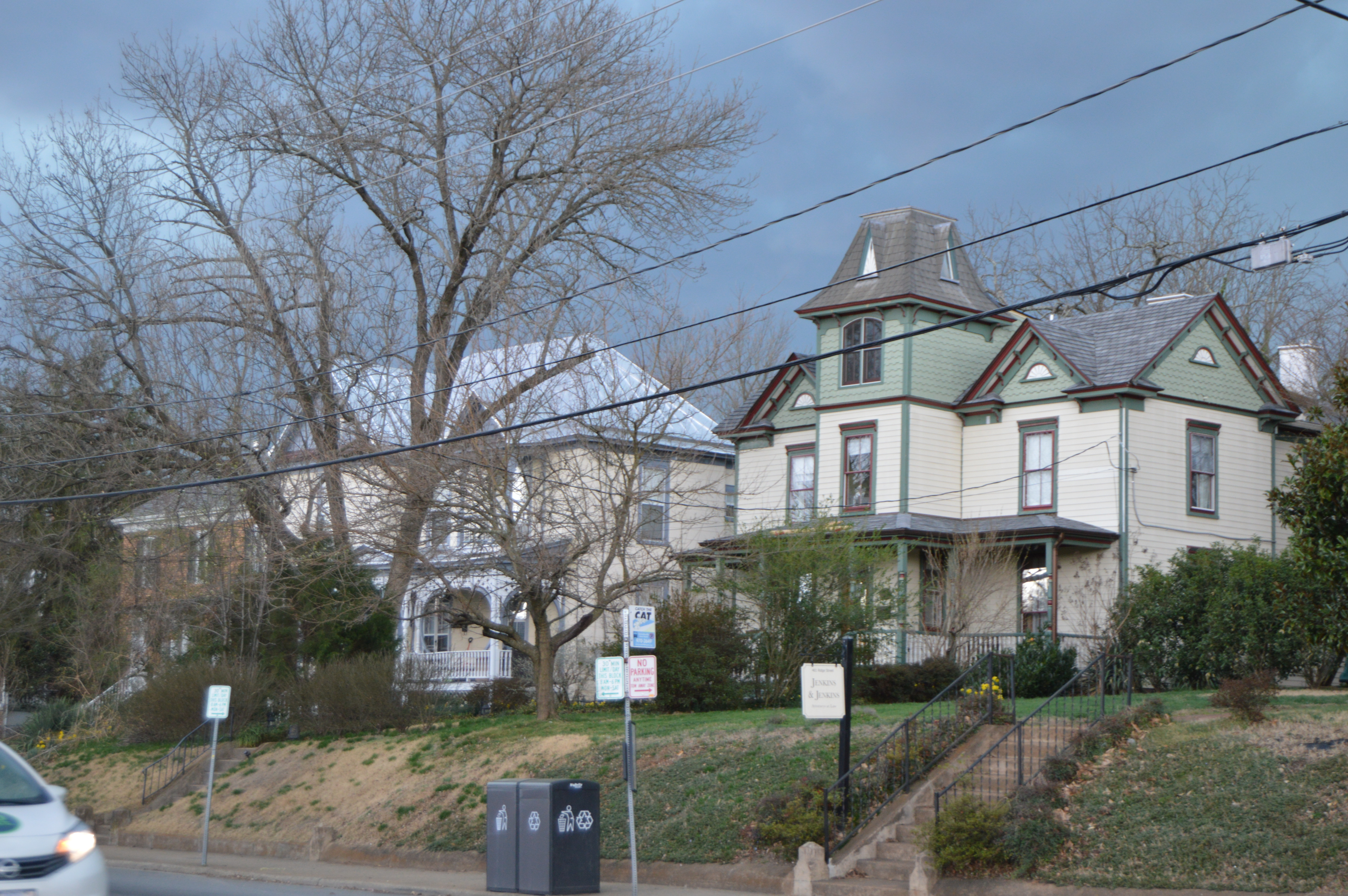
- Ridge Street, just south of Oak Street

- Location within Virginia Location within the United States
- Location: 200-700 Ridge St., Charlottesville, Virginia
- Coordinates: 38°1′39″N 78°29′19″W
- Area: 20 acres (8.1 ha)
- Architectural style: Late Victorian
- MPS: Charlottesville MRA
- NRHP reference No.: 82001813
- VLR No.: 104-0025

Significant dates
- Added to NRHP: October 21, 1982
- Designated VLR: December 3, 2003

Ridge Street Historic District is a national historic district located at Charlottesville, Virginia. The district encompasses 32 contributing buildings in a four block residential section of the city of Charlottesville. It was primarily developed after the 1870s-1880s. Notable buildings include the Gleason House (1890s), Fuller-Bailey House (1892), Clarence L. Hawkins House (1915), Bibb-Wolfe House (c. 1850), Gianny-Bailey House (1895), Walters-Witkin House (c. 1881), and Colonel John B. Strange House (1855).

It was listed on the National Register of Historic Places in 1982.
