= Pitts-Inge =

Historic commercial building in Virginia, United States

- U.S. National Register of Historic Places
- Virginia Landmarks Register
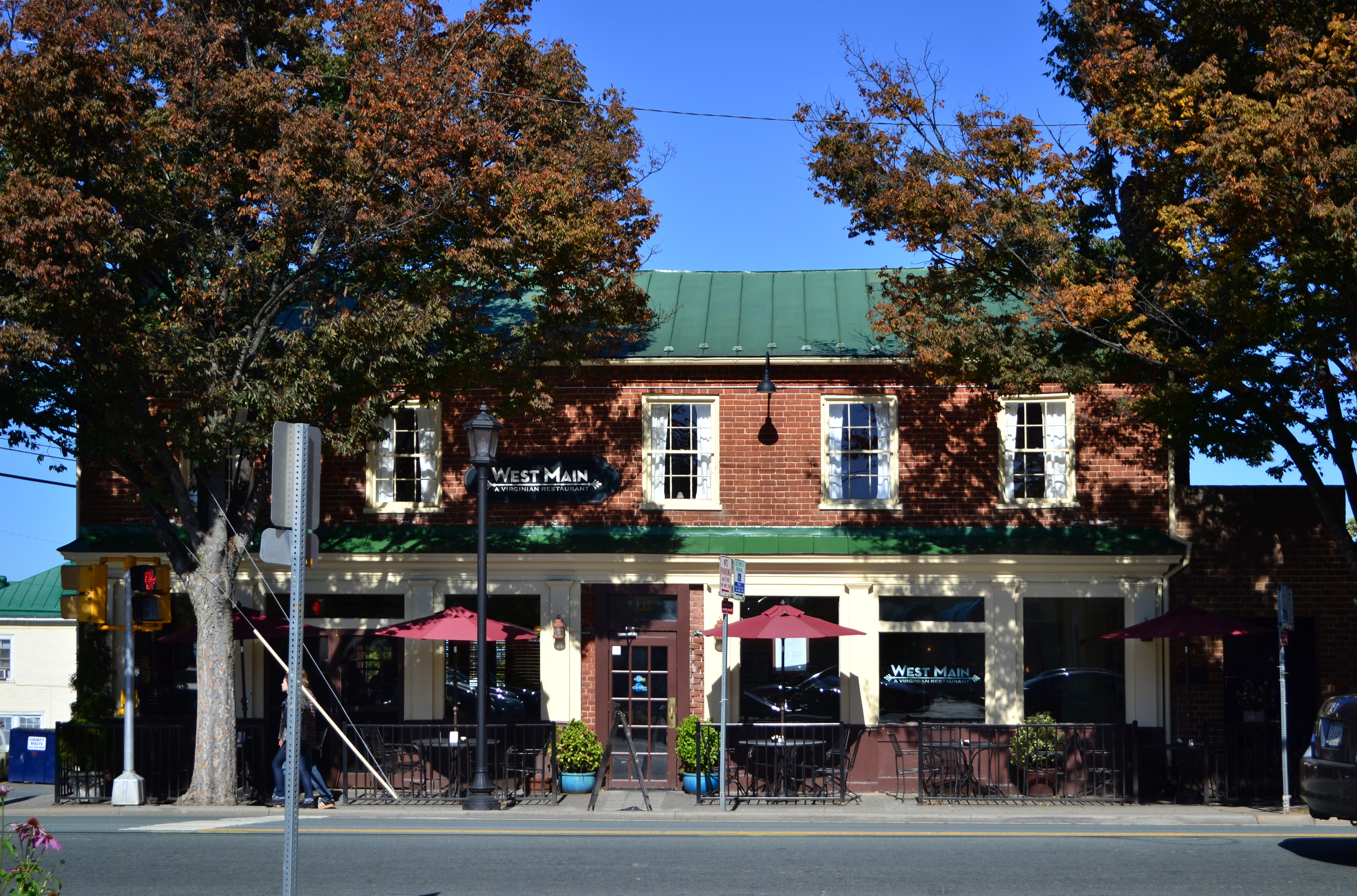
- Pitts-Inge

- Location within Virginia Location within the United States
- Location: 331-333 W. Main St., Charlottesville, Virginia
- Coordinates: 38°1′50″N 78°29′12″W
- Area: less than one acre
- Built: 1820
- Architectural style: Federal
- MPS: Charlottesville MRA
- NRHP reference No.: 82001812
- VLR No.: 104-0035

Significant dates
- Added to NRHP: October 21, 1982
- Designated VLR: October 21, 1982

Pitts-Inge is a historic commercial building located at Charlottesville, Virginia. It was built in 1820, and is a two-story, Federal style, brick building. Only the right half of the building, with two stories and the bays were part of the original structure.

It was listed on the National Register of Historic Places in 1980.

Inge's Store is a grocery, built in the Federal Style, in 1820 by Johnson W. Pitt, originally as a residence. Its significance is in its style, its metal canopy, and its historic ownership, belonging to and operated by the same family since 1890.

In 1820, Pitt bought two unimproved lots from Joseph Bishop for 100 dollars. Pitt built a house on the lot, and sold it to Lawrence P. Catlett for $1,000 in September 1821. Catlett sold the property for $812.84 in September 1828 to William F. Gooch, who sold it in January 1883 for $700. A brick kitchen was added during this time. In 1841 it was purchased, with improvements, for $2,000 by the Methodist Episcopal Church to be used as a parsonage. The church was forced to sell the house at public auction to Nimrod Sowell for $1,220 in 1842.

In 1850 it was purchased by Harris & Taylor and became an iron foundry. In November 1853 it was sold to Musgrove and Patterson, merchants. When Musgrove and Patterson's business ended, the property was sold for $1,900 to John M. Barksdale and John N. Fry. During their 4-year ownership a smokehouse was added. In 1863, the property was sold to Isaac and Simon Letterman for $4,050. In 1887, the property was sold for $2,500 to Liebichen Levine, who then sold it to George Pinkney Inge for $3,000 in February 1890.

Inge had been born a slave. He worked as a school teacher in Charlottesville, but opened the building at 331-333 West Main for business in July 1891. The Inge family continued to operate the property until it was sold to Leslie C. Lafon in December 1979.

By 1896, the building had doubled in size, with a second wing added. By 1907 a frame porch was added to the rear, and by 1920 more rooms were added, bringing the building to its current shape.
