= Rose Cottage/Peyton House =

Historic house in Virginia, United States

- Formerly listed on the U.S. National Register of Historic Places
- Virginia Landmarks Register
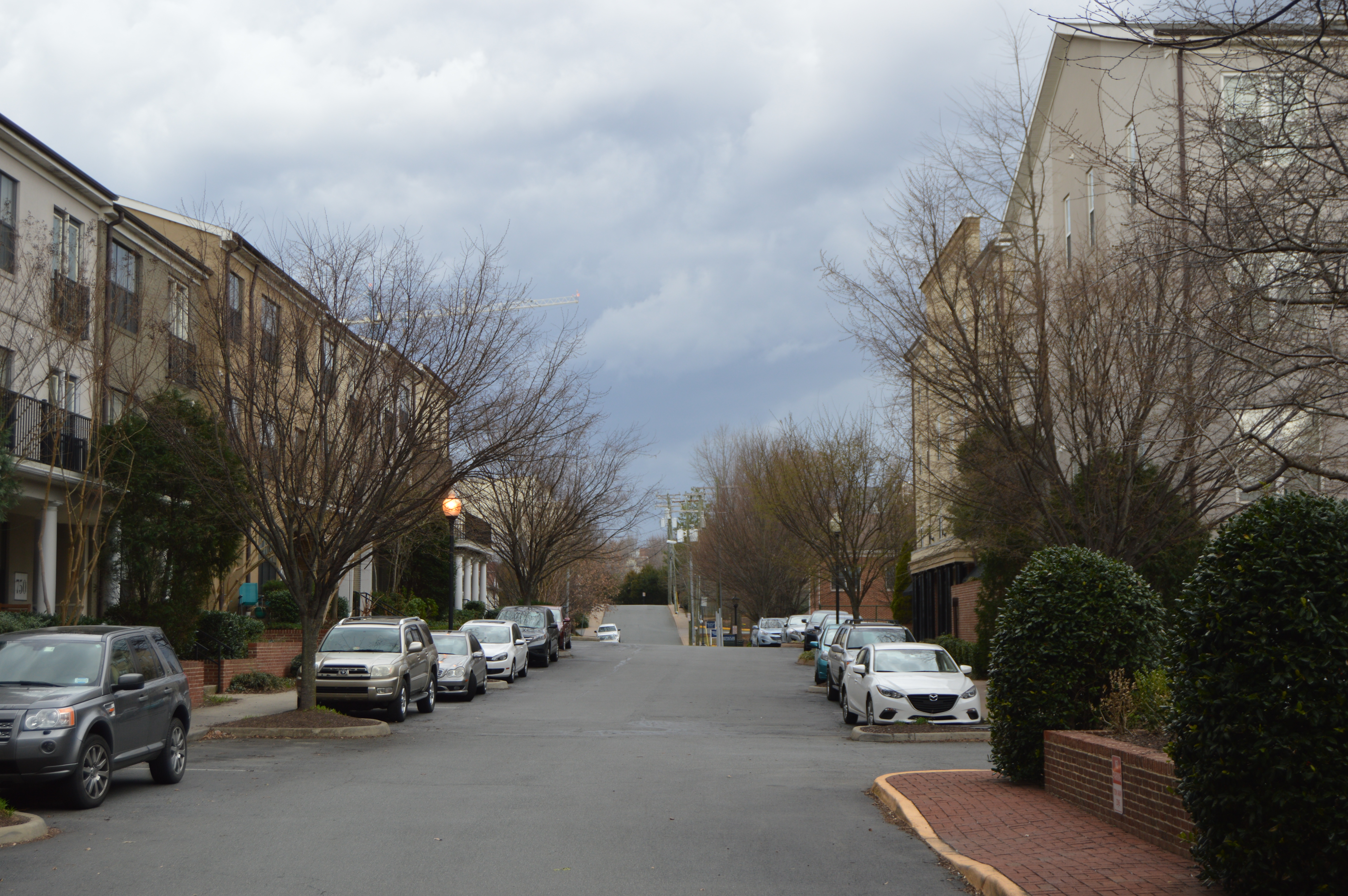
- Site of the house, now occupied by condominia

- Location within Virginia Location within the United States
- Location: 800 Delevan St., Charlottesville, Virginia
- Coordinates: 38°1′50″N 78°29′31″W
- Area: 30.1 acres (12.2 ha)
- Built: 1856
- MPS: Charlottesville MRA
- NRHP reference No.: 83003273
- VLR No.: 104-0230

Significant dates
- Added to NRHP: August 10, 1983
- Designated VLR: October 20, 1981
- Removed from NRHP: February 7, 2017

Rose Cottage/Peyton House is a historic home located at Charlottesville, Virginia. It was built in 1856, as a simple three-bay, single-pile, two-story rectangular frame dwelling. The house is sheathed in weatherboard. Later 20th century additions include a single story Colonial Revival porch; matching one-story, one room wings; and a two-story, perpendicular house joined by and enclosed porch.

It was listed on the National Register of Historic Places in 1983, and was removed from the National Register in 2017.
