= Stonefield (Charlottesville, Virginia) =

Historic house in Virginia, United States

- U.S. National Register of Historic Places
- Virginia Landmarks Register
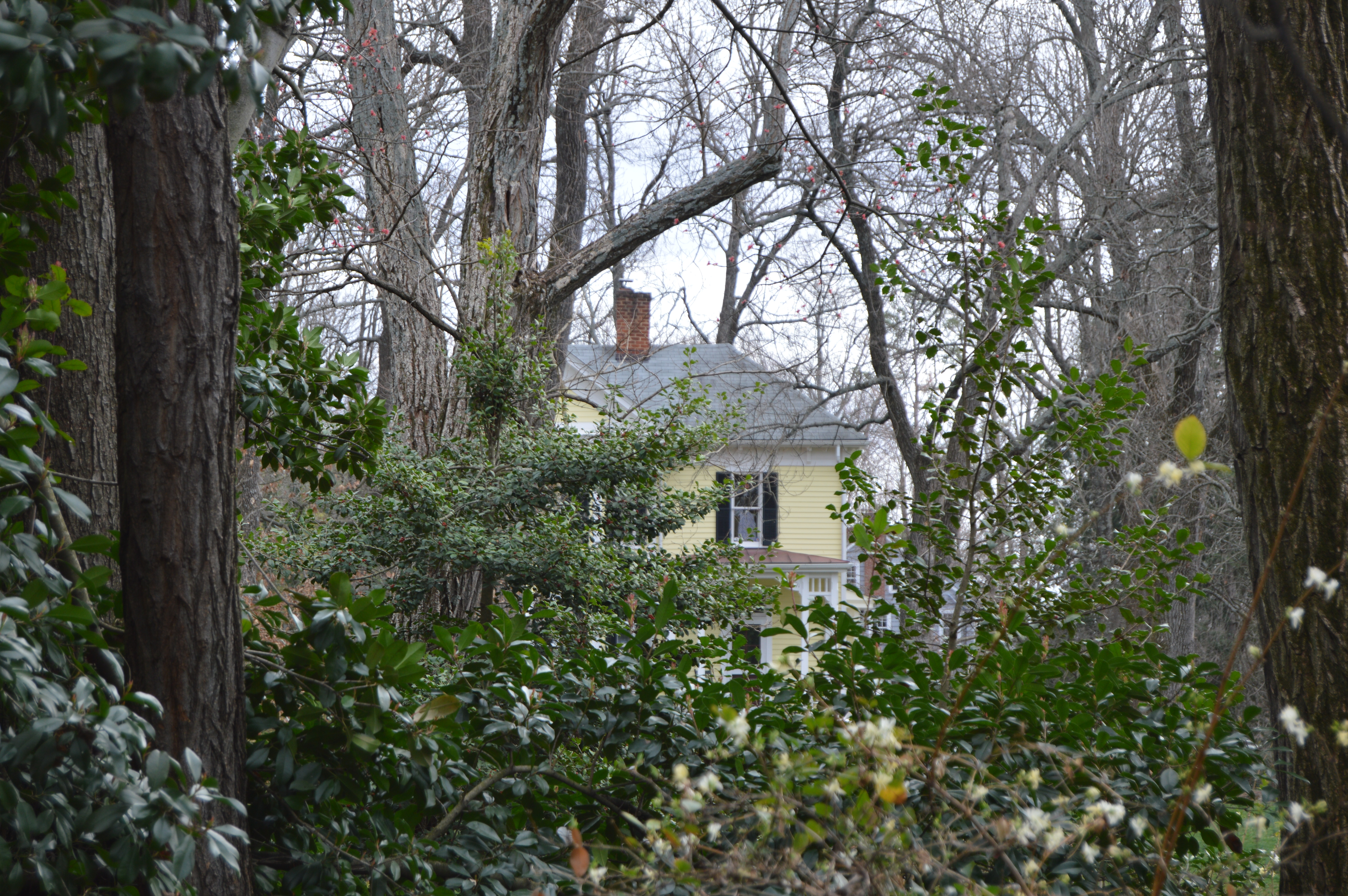
- Front, seen through trees

- Location within Virginia Location within the United States
- Location: 1204 Rugby Rd., Charlottesville, Virginia
- Coordinates: 38°2′52″N 78°29′34″W
- Area: 2.2 acres (0.89 ha)
- Built: c. 1860, 1880–1884
- Architectural style: Queen Anne, Italianate
- MPS: Charlottesville MRA
- NRHP reference No.: 84003524
- VLR No.: 104-5094

Significant dates
- Added to NRHP: January 10, 1984
- Designated VLR: October 20, 1981

Stonefield is a historic home located at Charlottesville, Virginia. It was built about 1860, as a simple, vernacular two-story, one-over-one-room frame house on a high brick basement. A two-story Queen Anne-style "facade", two rooms in width and one room deep, effectively masking the original rambling vernacular structure behind. It was added between 1880 and 1884. This section has a hipped roof with a large gable that overhangs a semi-octagonal bay-projection.

It was listed on the National Register of Historic Places in 1984.
