= Peyton–Ellington Building =

Historic commercial building in Virginia, United States

- U.S. National Register of Historic Places
- Virginia Landmarks Register
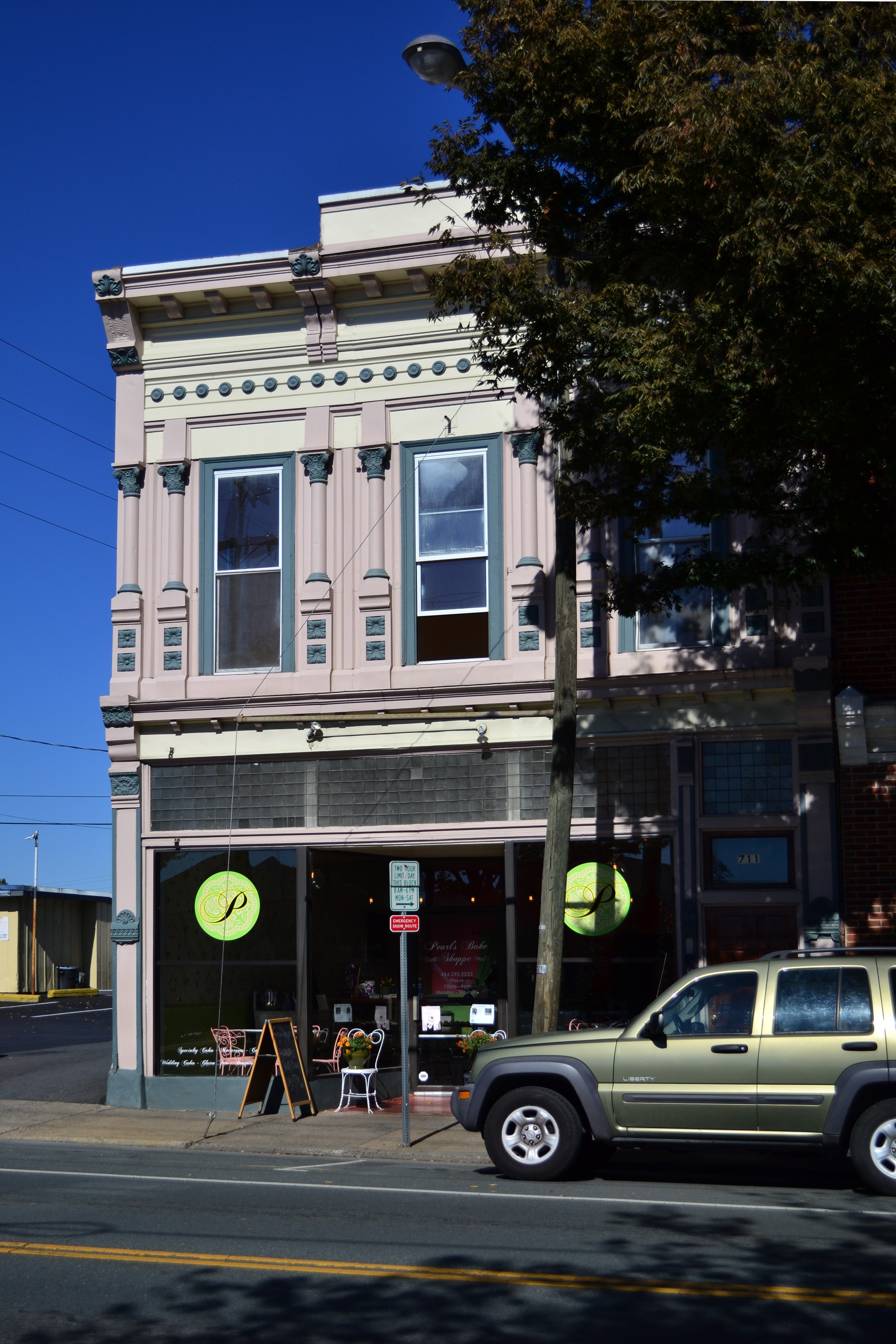
- Peyton–Ellington Building

- Location within Virginia Location within the United States
- Location: 711 W. Main St., Charlottesville, Virginia
- Coordinates: 38°1′53″N 78°29′26″W
- Area: 25' x 132.7' sq ft.
- Built: 1893
- Built by: A. N. Peyton
- Architectural style: Late Victorian
- MPS: Charlottesville MRA
- NRHP reference No.: 82001811
- VLR No.: 104-0375

Significant dates
- Added to NRHP: October 21, 1982
- Designated VLR: October 20, 1981

Peyton–Ellington Building is a historic commercial building located at Charlottesville, Virginia. It was built in 1893, and is a two-story, three-bay, brick building with an iron front facade. The facade features decorated pilasters at each end that support a cornice with a plain frieze, modillions, and cornice stops.

It was listed on the National Register of Historic Places in 1982.

== History ==
In 1982, Sarah F. Culin sold a corner of her yard to N. Peyton before it was rented by P. Ellington as a dry goods store, giving it the name "Peyton-Ellington". Ellington Purchased the building in 1901, owning it for 23 years; handing it over to Carter in 1924. After being sold by Ellington, a book store was ran within the shop by Charles Worthington.
