= Four Acres (Charlottesville, Virginia) =

Historic house in Virginia, United States

- U.S. National Register of Historic Places
- Virginia Landmarks Register
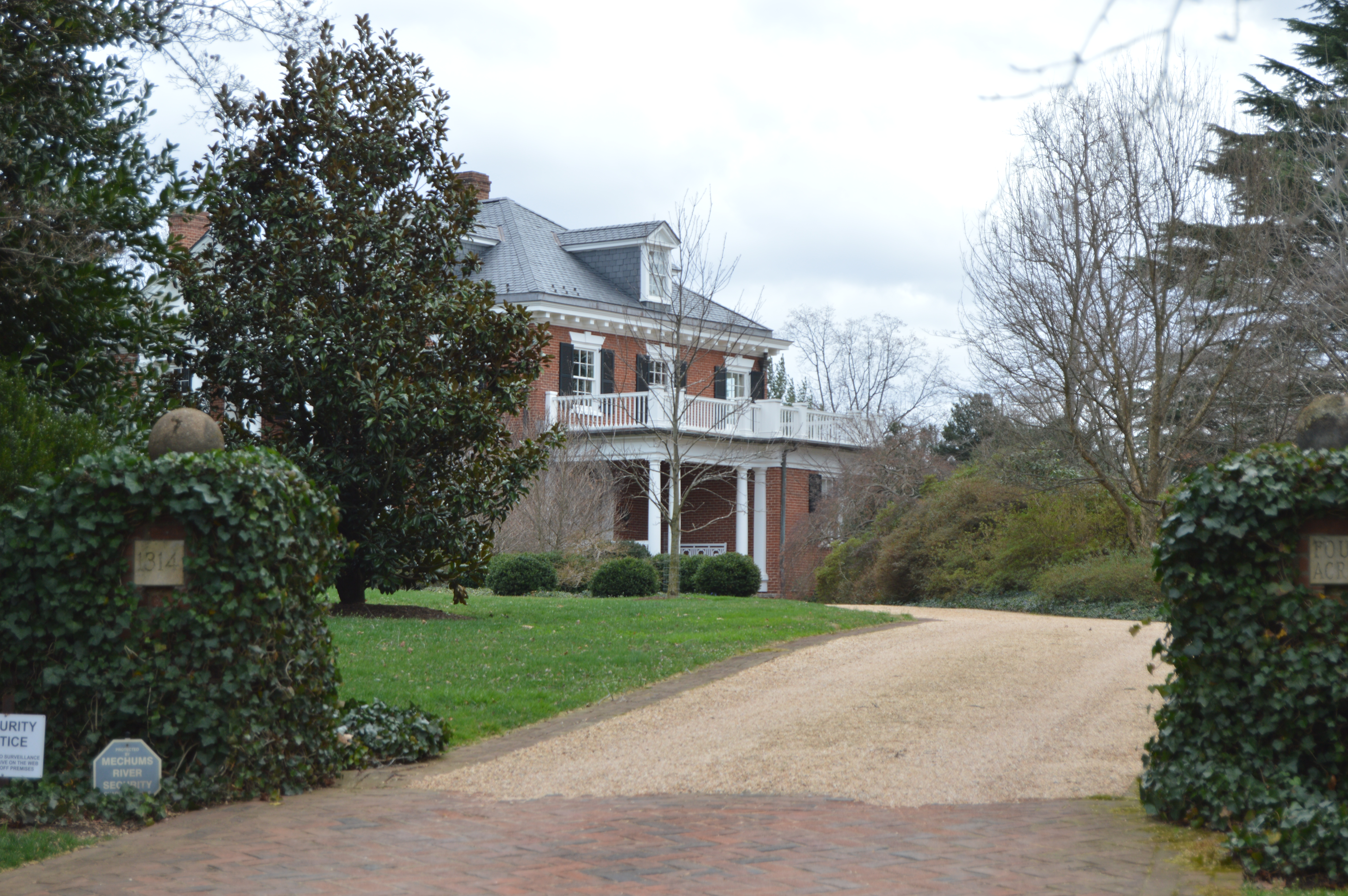
- Street view of the house

- Location within Virginia Location within the United States
- Location: 1314 Rugby Rd., Charlottesville, Virginia
- Coordinates: 38°2′52″N 78°29′34″W
- Area: 5.5 acres (2.2 ha)
- Built: 1910
- Architect: Eugene Bradbury
- Architectural style: Colonial Revival
- MPS: Charlottesville MRA
- NRHP reference No.: 82001805
- VLR No.: 104-0244

Significant dates
- Added to NRHP: October 21, 1982
- Designated VLR: October 20, 1981

Four Acres is a historic home located at Charlottesville, Virginia. It was built in 1910, and is a 2 1/2-story, three-bay, Colonial Revival-style brick dwelling. It sits in a raised basement and has a slate hipped roof. The front facade features a four-columned, Ionic order portico.

It was listed on the National Register of Historic Places in 1982. In 2016, it was listed for sale for over $10 million.
