= National Register of Historic Places listings in Albemarle County, Virginia =

Location of Albemarle County in Virginia

This is a list of the National Register of Historic Places listings in Albemarle County, Virginia.

This is intended to be a complete list of the properties and districts on the National Register of Historic Places in Albemarle County, Virginia, United States. The locations of National Register properties and districts for which the latitude and longitude coordinates are included below, may be seen in an online map.

This list does not include properties and districts located entirely within the city limits of Charlottesville, which is separate from Albemarle County despite being surrounded by it.

There are 105 properties and districts listed on the National Register in the county, including 5 National Historic Landmarks. Another property was once listed but has been removed.

This National Park Service list is complete through NPS recent listings posted May 1, 2026.

== Current listings ==
	Name on the Register	Image	Date listed	Location	City or town	Description
1	Advance Mills	Advance Mills	April 12, 2002 (#02000362)	Junction of Advance Mills and Frays Mills Rds. 38°11′00″N 78°26′21″W	Advance Mills	
2	The Anchorage	The Anchorage	July 13, 2001 (#01000688)	1864 Anchorage Farm; 37°58′27″N 78°36′55″W	Charlottesville	
3	Arrowhead	Arrowhead	July 9, 1991 (#91000885)	Eastern side of U.S. Route 29 at Arrowhead Farm Ln. 37°58′49″N 78°35′41″W	Charlottesville	
4	The Aviator	The Aviator	November 9, 2006 (#06000758)	575 Alderman Rd. 38°02′11″N 78°30′21″W	Charlottesville	
5	Ballard-Maupin House	Ballard-Maupin House	February 5, 1999 (#99000142)	4257 Ballard's Mill Rd. 38°09′11″N 78°35′49″W	Free Union	
6	Batesville Historic District	Batesville Historic District	December 9, 1999 (#99001500)	Junction of Plank and Craigs Store Rds. 37°59′44″N 78°43′21″W	Batesville	
7	Bel Aire	Bel Aire	March 7, 2007 (#07000132)	4710 Dickerson Rd. 38°09′46″N 78°25′38″W	Charlottesville	
8	Bellair	Bellair	October 15, 1992 (#92001372)	Southern side of Secretarys Rd., 3.8 miles (6.1 km) east of the junction with State Route 20; 37°53′22″N 78°31′08″W	Charlottesville	
9	Bellevue	Bellevue	July 9, 1991 (#91000886)	Southern side of Plank Rd., 3,500 feet (1,100 m) west of the Dick Woods Rd. junction 38°00′38″N 78°44′57″W	Batesville	
10	Bentivar	Bentivar	April 20, 2005 (#05000333)	1601 Bentivar Farm Rd. 38°04′59″N 78°26′05″W	Charlottesville	
11	Birdwood	Birdwood	October 23, 2003 (#03001094)	500 Birdwood Dr. 38°02′56″N 78°32′01″W	Charlottesville	
12	Blenheim	Blenheim	May 17, 1976 (#76002089)	South of Charlottesville on Blenheim Rd. 37°55′59″N 78°29′59″W	Blenheim	
13	Blue Ridge Farm	Blue Ridge Farm	January 25, 1991 (#90002163)	South of the junction of Plank and Ortman Rds. 38°00′46″N 78°46′03″W	Greenwood	
14	Blue Ridge Swim Club	Blue Ridge Swim Club	May 19, 2015 (#15000248)	1275 Owensville Rd. 38°04′24″N 78°35′23″W	Ivy	
15	Boyd Tavern	Boyd Tavern	November 12, 2009 (#09000919)	Union Mills Rd. 37°59′05″N 78°20′20″W	Boyd Tavern	
16	Campbell Hall		March 28, 2025 (#100005279)	110 Bayly Dr. 38°02′20″N 78°30′15″W	Charlottesville	
17	Carr's Hill	Carr's Hill	April 23, 2008 (#08000340)	1910 Carr's Hill Rd. 38°02′17″N 78°30′14″W	Charlottesville	
18	Carrsbrook	Carrsbrook	July 8, 1982 (#82004532)	Gloucester Ct. 38°05′37″N 78°27′18″W	Charlottesville	
19	Casa Maria	Casa Maria	December 28, 1990 (#90001999)	Ortman Rd., south of the junction with U.S. Route 250; 38°01′55″N 78°45′27″W	Greenwood	
20	Castle Hill	Castle Hill	February 23, 1972 (#72001379)	Northeast of Cismont near the junction of State Route 231 and Turkey Sag Rd. 38°05′08″N 78°17′53″W	Cismont	
21	The Cedars	The Cedars	December 27, 1990 (#89001909)	U.S. Route 250, west of Interstate 64; 38°02′29″N 78°44′18″W	Greenwood	
22	Christ Church Glendower	Christ Church Glendower	July 2, 1971 (#71000974)	On Glendower Rd., 0.4 miles (0.64 km) southwest of the junction with Coles Rolling Rd. 37°51′11″N 78°32′03″W	Keene	
23	George Rogers Clark Sculpture	George Rogers Clark Sculpture	May 16, 1997 (#97000448)	Monument Square, bounded by University and Jefferson Park Aves. and the railroad tracks 38°02′00″N 78°29′56″W	Charlottesville	
24	Clark Hall, University of Virginia	Clark Hall, University of Virginia	September 5, 2008 (#08000871)	291 McCormick Rd. 38°01′59″N 78°30′28″W	Charlottesville	
25	Cliffside	Cliffside	September 16, 1982 (#82004536)	North of Scottsville on State Route 6; 37°48′12″N 78°29′58″W	Scottsville	
26	Clifton	Clifton	November 2, 1989 (#89001922)	Milton Rd. at the Rivanna River; 38°00′25″N 78°23′50″W	Shadwell	
27	Cobham Park	Cobham Park	July 18, 1974 (#74002101)	South of State Route 22; 38°03′31″N 78°15′44″W	Cobham	
28	Cocke's Mill House and Mill Site	Cocke's Mill House and Mill Site	December 6, 1990 (#90001828)	Plank Rd. north of its junction with Alberene Rd. 37°54′30″N 78°37′02″W	North Garden	
29	Cove Presbyterian Church	Cove Presbyterian Church	November 2, 1989 (#89001935)	U.S. Route 29, north of Boaz Rd. 37°53′05″N 78°42′39″W	Covesville	
30	Covesville Historic District	Covesville Historic District	June 2, 2005 (#05000521)	Roughly along the railroad tracks, U.S. Route 29, Covesville Ln., and Boaz Rd. 37°53′27″N 78°42′17″W	Covesville	
31	Crossroads Tavern	Crossroads Tavern	August 16, 1984 (#84003481)	Plank Rd. 37°57′27″N 78°39′38″W	Crossroads	
32	Crozet Historic District	Crozet Historic District	November 28, 2012 (#12000985)	Roughly Railroad, St. George, and Crozet Aves. 38°04′18″N 78°42′06″W	Crozet	
33	D.S. Tavern	D.S. Tavern	September 29, 1983 (#83003255)	U.S. Route 250; 38°03′13″N 78°34′02″W	Ivy	
34	Earlysville Union Church	Earlysville Union Church	December 11, 1997 (#97001504)	Advance Mills Rd., south of the junction with Buck Mountain Rd. 38°09′25″N 78°28′59″W	Earlysville	
35	East Belmont	East Belmont	August 2, 1999 (#99000853)	Junction of State Route 22 and Black Cat Rd. 38°01′58″N 78°22′03″W	Keswick	
36	Edge Hill	Edge Hill	September 9, 1982 (#82004537)	North of Shadwell on State Route 22; 38°01′05″N 78°23′41″W	Shadwell	
37	Edgemont	Edgemont	November 28, 1980 (#80004162)	Southeast of Colesville on Plank Rd. 37°54′17″N 78°37′01″W	Covesville	
38	Ednam House	Ednam House	July 8, 1982 (#82004533)	U.S. Route 250; 38°03′07″N 78°32′17″W	Ednam	
39	Emmanuel Church	Emmanuel Church	July 8, 1982 (#82004535)	U.S. Route 250; 38°02′00″N 78°45′47″W	Greenwood	
40	Esmont	Esmont	May 6, 1980 (#80004163)	North of Esmont; 37°50′30″N 78°36′25″W	Esmont	
41	Estes Farm	Estes Farm	May 17, 2006 (#06000409)	6185 Estes Ln. 38°12′18″N 78°29′44″W	Dyke	
42	Estouteville	Estouteville	January 30, 1978 (#78003002)	Southeast of Powell Corner off Plank Rd. 37°53′12″N 78°34′23″W	Powell Corner	
43	Farmington	Farmington	September 15, 1970 (#70000782)	West of the junction of U.S. Routes 29 and 250; 38°03′44″N 78°32′30″W	Charlottesville	
44	Faulkner House	Faulkner House	May 3, 1984 (#84003484)	2201 Old Ivy Rd. 38°02′52″N 78°30′49″W	Charlottesville	
45	Gallison Hall	Gallison Hall	December 28, 1990 (#90002013)	24 Farmington Dr. 38°04′11″N 78°32′08″W	Charlottesville	
46	Gardner House	Gardner House	March 18, 2020 (#100005103)	3137 Shiffletts Mill Rd. 38°13′29″N 78°36′49″W	Crozet	
47	Grace Church	Grace Church	October 21, 1976 (#76002091)	Northeast of Cismont on State Route 231; 38°03′39″N 78°18′30″W	Cismont	
48	Greenwood-Afton Rural Historic District	Greenwood-Afton Rural Historic District	May 6, 2011 (#11000258)	Roughly 5 miles (8.0 km) to 7 miles (11 km) north and south of Interstate 64; 38°03′21″N 78°46′12″W	Greenwood	Boundaries modified on February 8, 2016. Extends into Augusta and Nelson counties
49	Guthrie Hall	Guthrie Hall	September 23, 1982 (#82004534)	North of Esmont on Alberene Rd. 37°50′56″N 78°36′40″W	Esmont	
50	Harris Farm	Harris Farm	May 18, 2015 (#15000249)	2950 State Route 53; 37°57′58″N 78°22′45″W	Charlottesville	
51	High Meadows	High Meadows	May 30, 1986 (#86001185)	Off State Route 20; 37°48′34″N 78°29′56″W	Scottsville	
52	Highland	Highland	August 14, 1973 (#73001990)	Southeast of Charlottesville off State Route 53; 37°58′58″N 78°27′22″W	Simeon	
53	Home Tract	Home Tract	December 9, 1999 (#99001501)	699 Ivy Depot Rd. 38°03′20″N 78°35′52″W	Ivy	
54	Kenridge	Kenridge	May 15, 2008 (#08000416)	912 Marsh Ln. 38°03′10″N 78°32′00″W	Charlottesville	
55	La Fourche		August 29, 2022 (#100008082)	3555 Keswick Rd. 38°00′47″N 78°22′31″W	Keswick	
56	Lewis Mountain	Lewis Mountain	December 7, 2009 (#09001052)	1 Lewis Mountain Parkway; 38°02′28″N 78°31′16″W	Charlottesville	
57	Limestone	Limestone	May 10, 2006 (#06000366)	4401 Limestone Rd. 37°59′29″N 78°21′12″W	Keswick	
58	Longwood	Longwood	October 18, 1996 (#96001074)	Northern side of Buck Mountain Rd. at its junction with Markwood and Simmons Gap Rds. 38°10′44″N 78°29′48″W	Earlysville	
59	Malvern	Malvern	August 4, 1995 (#95000974)	Western side of Taylors Gap Rd., 1,250 feet (380 m) north of the junction with Dick Woods Rd. 38°01′46″N 78°38′25″W	Charlottesville	
60	Leander McCormick Observatory	Leander McCormick Observatory	November 19, 2004 (#04001245)	600 McCormick Rd. 38°01′58″N 78°31′20″W	Charlottesville	
61	Mechum River Farm	Mechum River Farm	March 29, 2007 (#07000235)	1207 Burchs Creek Rd. 38°00′32″N 78°43′08″W	Charlottesville	
62	Memorial Gymnasium	Memorial Gymnasium	December 4, 2004 (#04001291)	210 S. Emmett St. 38°02′15″N 78°30′26″W	Charlottesville	
63	Midway	Midway	February 28, 1979 (#79003152)	Southeast of Millington off Ridge Rd. 38°06′34″N 78°35′56″W	Millington	
64	Miller School of Albemarle	Miller School of Albemarle	February 15, 1974 (#74002102)	1000 Samuel Miller Loop; 38°00′22″N 78°42′05″W	Yancey Mills	
65	Mirador	Mirador	April 7, 1983 (#83003256)	U.S. Route 250; also 7459 Mirador Farm Rd. 38°02′17″N 78°45′26″W	Greenwood	Second address represents a boundary increase of May 2, 2003
66	Monroe Hill	Monroe Hill	June 2, 2004 (#04000575)	252 and 256 McCormick Rd. 38°02′05″N 78°30′25″W	Charlottesville	
67	Monticello	Monticello	October 15, 1966 (#66000826)	2 miles (3.2 km) south of Charlottesville on State Route 53; 38°00′37″N 78°27′09″W	Charlottesville	
68	Monticola	Monticola	June 22, 1990 (#90000872)	Howardsville Turnpike north of the junction with Lewiston Ford Rd. 37°44′33″N 78°38′57″W	Howardsville	
69	Morven	Morven	April 24, 1973 (#73001991)	West of Simeon off State Route 20; 37°57′59″N 78°28′18″W	Simeon	
70	Mount Fair	Mount Fair	December 28, 1990 (#90001997)	Junction of Slam Gate Rd. and Browns Gap Turnpike; 38°09′52″N 78°40′40″W	Browns Cove	
71	Mount Ida	Mount Ida	April 27, 1987 (#87000624)	East of Blenheim Rd., about 4 miles (6.4 km) north of Scottsville; 37°51′03″N 78°28′56″W	Scottsville	
72	Mount Walla	Mount Walla	November 22, 2000 (#00001442)	604 Poplar Springs Rd. 37°48′01″N 78°29′32″W	Scottsville	
73	Mountain Grove	Mountain Grove	September 8, 1980 (#80004164)	Northwest of Esmont on Secretarys Sand Rd. 37°50′08″N 78°38′25″W	Esmont	
74	Pantops Farm	Pantops Farm	May 7, 2014 (#05000483)	400 Peter Jefferson St. 38°01′34″N 78°26′32″W	Charlottesville	
75	Periwinkle Cottage	Periwinkle Cottage	November 19, 2019 (#100004659)	2245 Blue Ridge Ln. 38°04′07″N 78°32′29″W	Charlottesville	
76	Piedmont	Piedmont	February 1, 1991 (#90002184)	Near the junction of Interstate 64 and Greenwood Rd. 38°02′46″N 78°46′32″W	Greenwood	
77	Pine Knot	Pine Knot	February 1, 1989 (#88003211)	Coles Rolling Rd. 37°50′57″N 78°31′30″W	Glendower	
78	Plain Dealing	Plain Dealing	May 6, 1980 (#80004165)	East of Keene; 37°51′41″N 78°31′56″W	Keene	
79	Proffit Historic District	Proffit Historic District	February 5, 1999 (#99000145)	Roughly the area around the junction of the Norfolk Southern railway tracks and Proffit Rd. 38°06′32″N 78°25′28″W	Proffit	
80	Ramsay	Ramsay	March 10, 2005 (#05000135)	7760 Rockfish Gap Turnpike; 38°02′06″N 78°46′04″W	Greenwood	
81	The Rectory	The Rectory	November 7, 1991 (#91001579)	Junction of Glendower and Coles Rolling Rds. 37°51′24″N 78°31′51″W	Keene	
82	Red Hills	Red Hills	February 13, 1998 (#98000047)	2051 Polo Grounds Rd. 38°05′44″N 78°25′40″W	Charlottesville	
83	Redlands	Redlands	November 12, 1969 (#69000218)	Junction of Secretarys and Carters Mountain Rds. 37°54′44″N 78°31′47″W	Covesville	
84	River View Farm		December 16, 2020 (#100005925)	1780 Earlysville Rd. 38°05′28″N 78°29′35″W	Charlottesville	
85	Rotunda, University of Virginia	Rotunda, University of Virginia	October 15, 1966 (#66000937)	University of Virginia; 38°02′08″N 78°30′12″W	Charlottesville	
86	Rugby Road-University Corner Historic District	Rugby Road-University Corner Historic District	February 16, 1984 (#84003523)	Roughly bounded by University Ave., Wayside Pl., 14th St., and U.S. Route 29; 38°02′17″N 78°30′11″W	Charlottesville	Extends into Charlottesville
87	St. James Church	St. James Church	January 14, 2013 (#12001186)	Garth Rd. east of Owensville Rd. 38°06′08″N 78°34′22″W	Charlottesville	also known as Garth Chapel
88	St. John School	St. John School	January 14, 2019 (#100003312)	1569 St. John Rd. 38°04′47″N 78°16′34″W	Gordonsville	
89	Scottsville Historic District	Scottsville Historic District	July 30, 1976 (#76002093)	State Route 6; also roughly bounded by the James River, the town limits, and Riverview, Mount Walla, Oakwood, Cliffside, and Chester; 37°48′00″N 78°29′46″W	Scottsville	Second set of boundaries represents a boundary increase of February 11, 2004. Extends into Fluvanna County.
90	Scottsville Tire Cord Plant		March 6, 2024 (#100010041)	800 Bird Street; 37°47′36″N 78°30′10″W	Scottsville	
91	Seven Oaks Farm and Black's Tavern	Seven Oaks Farm and Black's Tavern	December 26, 1989 (#89001906)	U.S. Route 250, west of Interstate 64; 38°02′31″N 78°44′47″W	Greenwood	
92	Shack Mountain	Shack Mountain	September 1, 1976 (#76002090)	2 miles (3.2 km) north-northwest of Charlottesville off Lambs Ln. 38°05′30″N 78°30′04″W	Charlottesville	
93	Skyline Drive Historic District	Skyline Drive Historic District	April 28, 1997 (#97000375)	Shenandoah National Park, from the north entrance station at Front Royal to the south entrance station at the Rockfish Gap; 38°13′48″N 78°43′34″W	Luray	
94	Southern Albemarle Rural Historic District	Southern Albemarle Rural Historic District	November 28, 2007 (#07001236)	Roughly bounded by the Rivanna River, State Route 20, Green Mountain, the James River, Blenheim, Jefferson Mill, Rolling, and Milton Rds., and the Monroe Parkway; 37°53′47″N 78°36′36″W	Charlottesville	
95	Southwest Mountains Rural Historic District	Southwest Mountains Rural Historic District	February 27, 1992 (#92000054)	Roughly bounded by Interstate 64, State Route 20, the Orange County line, and the CSX railroad tracks 38°04′49″N 78°16′36″W	Keswick	
96	Spring Hill	Spring Hill	November 21, 1983 (#83004232)	Dick Woods Rd. 38°02′53″N 78°36′04″W	Ivy	
97	Sunny Bank	Sunny Bank	December 12, 1976 (#76002092)	Northeast of Covesville, west of the junction of Plank and Old Lynchburg Rds. 37°55′15″N 78°38′56″W	South Garden	
98	Sunnyfields	Sunnyfields	June 10, 1993 (#93000509)	Western side of State Route 53, at the junction with Milton Rd. 37°59′32″N 78°27′14″W	Simeon	
99	University of Virginia Historic District	University of Virginia Historic District	November 20, 1970 (#70000865)	Bounded by University and Jefferson Park Aves., and Hospital and McCormick Rds. 38°02′05″N 78°30′15″W	Charlottesville	Historic district on grounds of University of Virginia
100	Walker House	Walker House	December 28, 1990 (#90002001)	Warren Ferry Rd. south of the junction with James River Rd. 37°46′11″N 78°33′31″W	Warren	
101	West Cote	West Cote	January 24, 2002 (#01001510)	Off Howardsville Turnpike and James River Rd. 37°44′03″N 78°39′05″W	Howardsville	
102	Woodburn	Woodburn	January 28, 2000 (#00000029)	Proffit Rd., 2 miles east of U.S. Route 29; 38°07′00″N 78°25′31″W	Charlottesville	
103	Woodlands	Woodlands	November 2, 1989 (#89001931)	Woodlands Rd. 38°06′20″N 78°30′03″W	Charlottesville	
104	Woodstock Hall Tavern	Woodstock Hall Tavern	January 29, 1987 (#86003735)	Dick Woods Rd. 38°01′37″N 78°37′52″W	Ivy	
105	Woolen Mills Village Historic District	Woolen Mills Village Historic District	April 12, 2010 (#10000196)	Area includes parts of Chesapeake, Franklin, Steephill, 18th, NE., and E. Market Sts. and Riverside Ave. in the City of Charlottesville; and parts of Pireus Row and Marchant and E. Market Sts. in Albemarle County. 38°01′15″N 78°27′20″W	Charlottesville	Extends into the city of Charlottesville

== Former listing ==
	Name on the Register	Image	Date listed	Date removed	Location	City or town	Description
1	Enniscorthy		September 24, 1992 (#92001273)	March 20, 2001	VA 627 .5 miles (0.80 km) south of the junction with VA 712	Keene	Delisted due to extensive alterations.

== See also ==
- List of National Historic Landmarks in Virginia
- National Register of Historic Places listings in Virginia
- National Register of Historic Places listings in Charlottesville, Virginia
