= Birdwood =

Birdwood may refer to:

== Places ==
=== Australia ===
- Birdwood, New South Wales, a town
- Birdwood, South Australia, a town

=== Canada ===
- Mount Birdwood, a mountain in Alberta

=== United States ===
- Birdwood, Nebraska, an unincorporated community
- Birdwood (Thomasville, Georgia), a historic house listed on the National Register of Historic Places in Thomas County, Georgia
- Birdwood (Charlottesville, Virginia), a historic house listed on the National Register of Historic Places in Albemarle County, Virginia

== People ==
- George Birdwood (1832–1917), Anglo-Indian official and naturalist
- Herbert Mills Birdwood (1837–1907), British administrator in India
- William Birdwood, 1st Baron Birdwood (1865–1951), British general
- Christopher Birdwood, 2nd Baron Birdwood (1899–1962), British peer
- Jane Birdwood, Baroness Birdwood (1913–2000), British political activist

== See also ==
- Birdwoodton, Victoria
