= Woodburn =

Woodburn may refer to:

- Woodburn (surname)

== Places ==
- Woodburn, New South Wales, Australia
- Woodburn, Nova Scotia, Canada
- Woodburn, an area of Dalkeith, Midlothian, Scotland
- East Woodburn, Northumberland, England
- West Woodburn, Northumberland
- Woodburn railway station, Northumberland, which used to serve East and West Woodburn

=== United States ===
- Delaware Governor's Mansion, also known as Woodburn
- Woodburn, Illinois
- Woodburn, Indiana
- Woodburn, Iowa
- Woodburn, Kentucky
- Woodburn, Oregon
- Woodburn (Pendleton, South Carolina), listed on the National Register of Historic Places (NRHP)
- Woodburn (Charles City, Virginia), listed on the National Register of Historic Places
- Woodburn (Charlottesville, Virginia), listed on the National Register of Historic Places
- Woodburn (Leesburg, Virginia), listed on the National Register of Historic Places
