= Enniscorthy (disambiguation) =

Enniscorthy may refer to:

- Enniscorthy, town in County Wexford, Ireland

or it may refer to:

- Enniscorthy (Ellicott City, Maryland), listed on the National Register of Historic Places in Howard County, Maryland
- Enniscorthy (Virginia), possibly delisted from the National Register of Historic Places in Albemarle County, Virginia in either 1997 or 2001, or relevant city name changed from Esmont to Keene in the same county
