= James Sterling Young =

American historian

Doctor James Sterling Young Professor Emeritus
- Born: October 27, 1927; Savannah, Georgia, U.S.
- Died: August 8, 2013 (aged 85); Advance Mills, Virginia
- Occupations: Director, Presidency at the Miller Center
- Known for: Founding the nation's only oral history program focused on United States presidents
- Board member of: Advisory Council of the Bicentennial of the United States Constitution
- Spouse: Virginia Heyer Young
- Children: Millicent Young and Eleanor Young Houston
- Awards: Bancroft Prize

Academic background
- Education: Columbia University
- Thesis: The Washington community, 1800-1828 (1966)

Academic work
- Discipline: Political science
- Sub-discipline: Public Law and Government
- Institutions: University of Virginia

James Sterling Young (October 14, 1927 – August 8, 2013) was an American political scientist, winner of the Bancroft Prize, Professor of Government and Randolph P. Compton Scholar at the University of Virginia.

== Biography ==
A native of Savannah, Georgia, Young attended the Savannah public schools through high school. Following United States Army service in China and Japan he received an A. B. degree from Princeton University. He pursued graduate study at Columbia University in political science, history, and anthropology. In 1964 he received a Ph.D. from Columbia and was appointed assistant professor in the Department of Public Law and Government. Young served on the Columbia faculty as an associate professor in 1968 and as a professor in 1971. He taught courses on American government and politics, established a graduate internship program with the City of New York, and directed a grants program to encourage the study of urban life and problems, concentrating on the Harlem community. Following the disruptions of 1969, he was elected to the first University Senate and chaired its committee on educational policy.

From 1971 to 1977, Young served as Columbia's third ranking academic officer, holding the posts of Deputy Provost and Vice President. He was principally responsible for the coordinated planning of the central university's academic programs, budgets, and physical facilities and for policies governing the use, historic preservation, and new construction of academic buildings on the Morningside campus. In 1978, he left his post at Columbia to join the University of Virginia as a professor in the Department of Government and Foreign Affairs and as director of the Program on the Presidency at the Miller Center.

He taught courses on the presidency, established a presidential research and publications program for resident scholars, and organized conferences of academicians, public officials, and journalists on trends affecting the future presidency. Young founded the nation's only oral history program focused on United States presidents at the Miller Center of Public Affairs, directing oral histories of the presidencies of Jimmy Carter, Ronald Reagan, George H. W. Bush and Bill Clinton. He also conducted an oral history on former United States Senator Edward M. Kennedy and the Senate of his time. Kennedy based his memoir, “True Compass,” on dozens of interviews with Young. Young was Senior Director of the Edward M. Kennedy Oral History Project.

According to Presidential Oral History Program chair Russell Riley, Young recorded more than 400 oral history sessions for the Miller Center's various projects.

Young is author of The Washington Community, 1800-1828, awarded the Bancroft Prize. He has held research appointments at the Institute of Politics of the John Fitzgerald Kennedy School of Government, the Brookings Institution, and the George Washington University. From 1985 to 1986, Young was a member of the Advisory Council of the Bicentennial of the United States Constitution. In 1987 he was invited by the Republic of Brazil to be a consultant and the United States participant in an international conference in Brasília on the drafting of a new 2 national constitution. In 1993 he served as U. S. Speaker in Asia for the United States Information Agency, giving talks on the founding and governance of the United States to public and university audiences in Beijing, Shanghai, Chengdu, Changchun, Guangzhou, and Bangkok. He is a member of Phi Beta Kappa society, the American Political Science Association, the American Oral History Association, and the International Oral History Association. He is past president of the Presidency Research Group, an organized section of the APSA which he helped to establish.

== Personal ==
He was married to the anthropologist Virginia Heyer Young. They lived together at Swift Run Farm in Albemarle County, Virginia. Young died on August 8, 2013, at his home in Advance Mills, Virginia. He was 85 and survived by his wife Virginia Heyer Young; two daughters, Millicent Young and Eleanor Young Houston; and two grandchildren.

== Awards ==
- 1967 Bancroft Prize

== Works ==
- The Washington Community, 1800–1828. Columbia University Press. 1966. ISBN 978-0-231-02901-8. "James Sterling Young" (reprint 1986 ISBN 978-0-231-08381-2)
