= Boyd Tavern =

Boyd Tavern or Boyd's Tavern may refer to:

- Boyd Tavern (Albemarle County, Virginia)
  - Boyd Tavern, Virginia, a community near the above tavern
- Boyd's Tavern (Mecklenburg County, Virginia)
