= Muzzle Awards =

Awards for activity against free speech

The Jefferson Muzzle Awards are an award given in the United States by the Thomas Jefferson Center for the Protection of Free Expression to people who are perceived to undermine freedom of speech.

== 2016 Jefferson Muzzle Awards ==
For the first time in 25 years, the Jefferson Center expanded anti-free speech awards to 50 recipients, the 2016 award is also unique in the aspect that all of the recipients are colleges.

Never in our 25 years of awarding the Jefferson Muzzles have we observed such an alarming concentration of anti-speech activity as we saw last year on college campuses across the country.

— The Thomas Jefferson Center for the Protection of Free Expression

Conversely, the Jefferson Center commended the University of Chicago, American University, Purdue University, and Princeton University for issuing "broadest possible latitude" statements concerning speech policy on their campuses.

- Alma College
- Amherst
- Brown
- Butler University
- Clemson University
- Colorado College
- Community College of Philadelphia
- Duke
- Emory
- Emporia State University
- George Washington University
- Hamilton College
- Harvard University
- Kean University
- Kutztown University of Pennsylvania
- Le Moyne College
- Louisiana State University
- Loyola University Chicago
- Northern Michigan University
- Northwestern
- Norwich University
- Oberlin College
- Old Dominion University
- Princeton University
- Saint Louis University
- Santa Barbara City College
- Smith College
- Southern Illinois University-Carbondale
- St. John Fisher College
- SUNY Buffalo
- Texas Christian University
- Texas Tech
- University of California, Los Angeles
- University of California System
- University of California-Berkeley
- University of Mary Washington
- University of Minnesota
- University of Missouri
- University of Missouri School of Law
- University of North Texas
- University of Oklahoma
- University of Oregon
- University of San Diego
- University of Southern California
- University of Tulsa
- Utica College
- Wesleyan University
- Williams College
- Yale University
- Youngstown State

== 2017 Jefferson Muzzle Awards ==
- The administration of Boca Raton Community High School
- The State Government of Illinois
- The California State Legislature and Governor Jerry Brown
- Florida's Collier County School District
- The United States Senate
- Bradley County (Tennessee) Sheriff Eric Watson
- The United States Olympic Committee
- The Pierce College Administration and the Los Angeles Community College
- North Carolina's Cumberland County School Superintendent, Frank Till, Jr.

== 2018 Jefferson Muzzle Awards ==
- Kearny High School (Missouri)
- U.S. Capitol Police
- Windfern High School Principal Martha Strother
- Starkville, Mississippi Board of Aldermen
- Oregon State Board of Examiners for Engineering and Land Surveying
- Parkway High School Principal Waylon Bates
- Herriman High School (Utah)

== See also ==
- William O. Douglas Prize
