= Wynhurst =

Historic house in Virginia, United States

- Wyndhurst
- U.S. National Register of Historic Places
- U.S. Historic district – Contributing property
- Virginia Landmarks Register
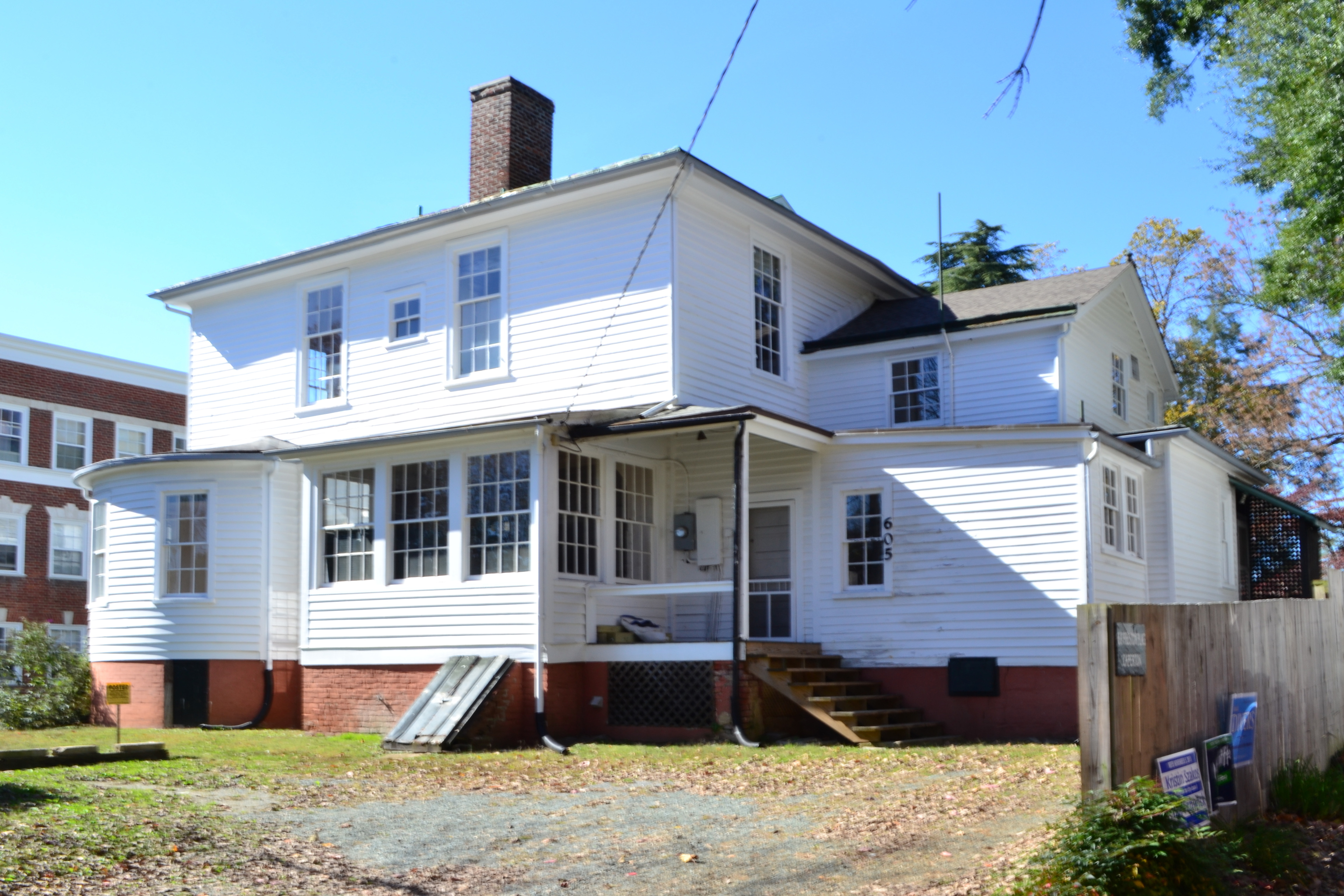
- Wynhurst

- Location within Virginia Location within the United States
- Location: 605 Preston Pl., Charlottesville, Virginia
- Coordinates: 38°2′30″N 78°29′56″W
- Area: less than one acre
- Built: 1857
- Architectural style: Greek Revival
- MPS: Charlottesville MRA
- NRHP reference No.: 82001816
- VLR No.: 104-0202

Significant dates
- Added to NRHP: October 21, 1982
- Designated VLR: October 20, 1981

Wyndhurst, also known as Wyndhurst and Preston Place, is a historic home located at Charlottesville, Virginia. It was built in 1857, and is a two-story, three-bay, frame dwelling with Greek Revival style decorative details. It has a low pitched hipped roof, one-story enclosed sun parlor, and two additions are connected by a one-story hyphen.

It was listed on the National Register of Historic Places in 1982. It is located in the Rugby Road-University Corner Historic District.
