= Preston Court Apartments =

- U.S. National Register of Historic Places
- U.S. Historic district – Contributing property
- Virginia Landmarks Register
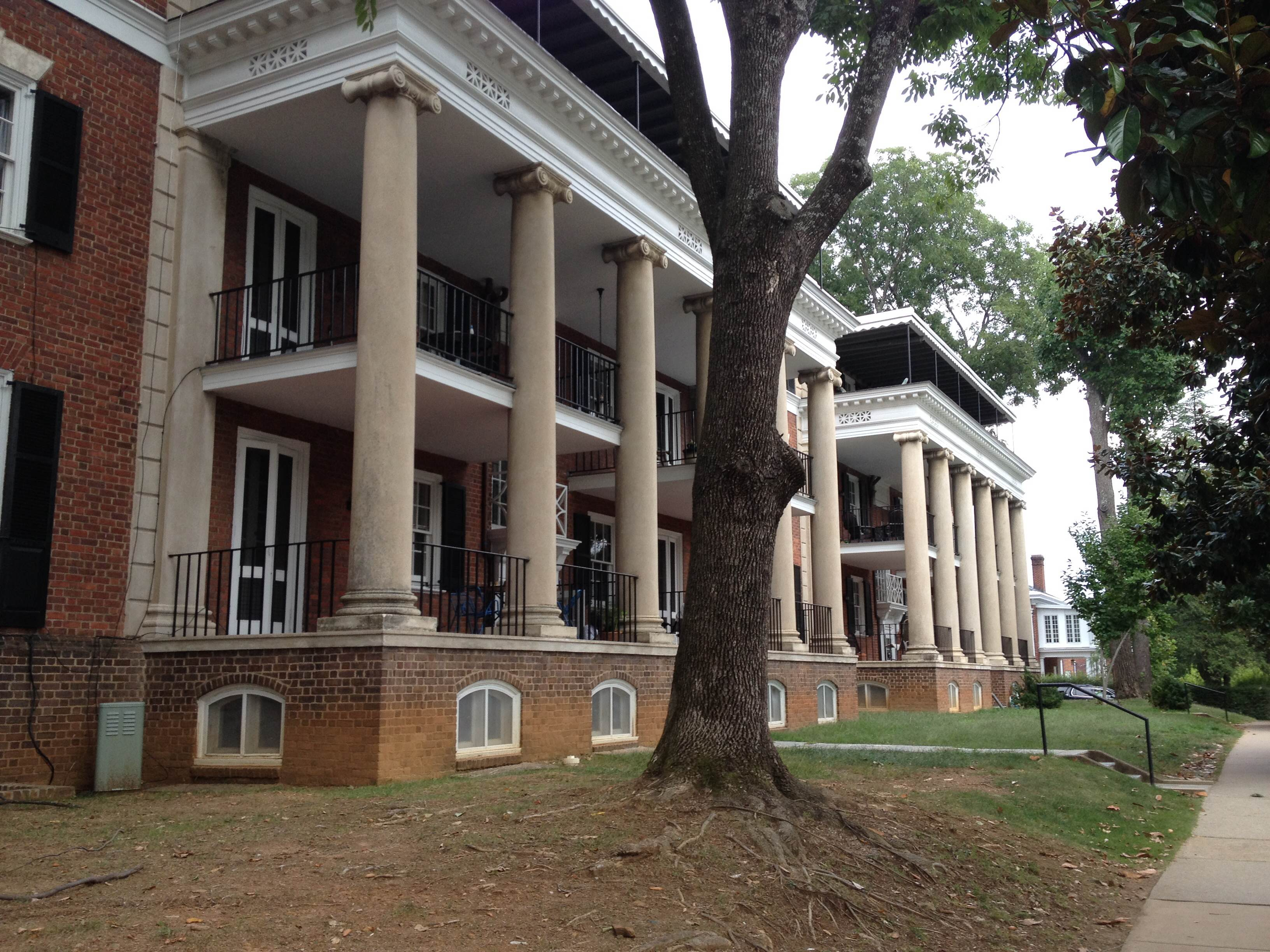

- Location within Virginia Location within the United States
- Location: 1600 Grady Ave., Charlottesville, Virginia
- Coordinates: 38°2′28″N 78°29′58″W
- Area: less than one acre
- Built: 1928
- Built by: Hartman, Frank E., Co
- Architect: Makielski, Stanislaw
- Architectural style: Classical Revival
- NRHP reference No.: 07001134
- VLR No.: 104-0239

Significant dates
- Added to NRHP: October 29, 2007
- Designated VLR: September 5, 2007

Preston Court Apartments is a historic apartment building in Charlottesville, Virginia, US built in 1928. It is a three-story, C-shaped, reinforced concrete building faced with brick. It has two two-story, five-bay, flat-roofed Ionic order porticos in the Classical Revival style. The building continues to be used as a rental/apartment building by the Hartman family.

It was listed on the National Register of Historic Places in 2007. It is located in the Rugby Road-University Corner Historic District.
