= Shack Mountain =

Historic house in Virginia, United States

- U.S. National Register of Historic Places
- U.S. National Historic Landmark
- Virginia Landmarks Register
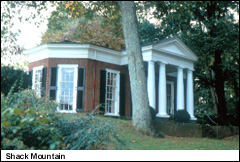

- Location within Virginia Location within the United States
- Location: 2 miles (3.2 km) north-northwest of Charlottesville near the junction of VA 657 and VA 743, near Charlottesville, Virginia
- Coordinates: 38°5′31.95″N 78°30′04.38″W
- Area: 100.9 acres (0.408 km^{2})
- Built: 1935
- Architect: Fiske Kimball
- Architectural style: Colonial Revival
- NRHP reference No.: 76002090
- VLR No.: 002-0200

Significant dates
- Added to NRHP: September 1, 1976
- Designated NHL: October 5, 1992
- Designated VLR: June 15, 1976

Shack Mountain is a house near Charlottesville, Virginia, that is a tribute to Thomas Jefferson's architectural style. It was designed by and for Fiske Kimball (1881-1955), an architectural historian who was the founder of the University of Virginia School of Architecture, and who is credited with restoring respect for Jefferson's architectural ability. The house derives its name from the Shackelford family, who owned and settled the property in the 18th century.

== History ==
Intended as a retirement home for Kimball, the house is based on Jefferson's design for Farmington. The house was built in 1935–36. Like Jefferson at Monticello, Kimball found a site with a commanding view of the wooded hills around Charlottesville. Kimball's intended name for the house was Tusculum, but the name "Shack Mountain," for earlier owners of the property, remained. Kimball and his wife Marie used the house as a retreat, mainly at Christmas and for two weeks in June, until they both died in 1955. They willed the house to the Philadelphia Museum of Art, where Kimball had been director. The museum sold the house to W. Bedford Moore III, a professor of engineering at the University of Virginia.

== Description ==
The one-story, T-shaped house features a projecting octagonal space to either side at the front. Fronting the elongated side of the octagon is a Tuscan portico with paired stucco columns. Windows are mostly triple-hung sashes. The roof is a shallow standing-seam metal hipped structure that defers to the portico. Exterior balustrades are in the Chinese Chippendale pattern. Entry is through the portico, with the front door leading into a shallow round vestibule projecting into the half-octagonal parlor to the left side with a curved door, an adaptation of Pavilion IX at the University of Virginia. A corresponding alcove leads to the cross corridor, while another door leads to the dining room which occupies the right side of the front octagonal volume. A wing to the rear contains kitchens and bedrooms, none of which are of unusual design. A basement houses utility spaces.

Shack Mountain was placed on the National Register of Historic Places on September 1, 1976, and was declared a National Historic Landmark on October 5, 1992, for its association with Kimball. The house is located about 2 miles (3.2 km) north-northwest of Charlottesville.

== See also ==
- List of National Historic Landmarks in Virginia
- National Register of Historic Places listings in Albemarle County, Virginia
