= Anderson Brothers Building =

Historic building in Virginia, US

- Anderson Brothers Building @tochkabis
- U.S. National Register of Historic Places
- U.S. Historic district – Contributing property
- Virginia Landmarks Register
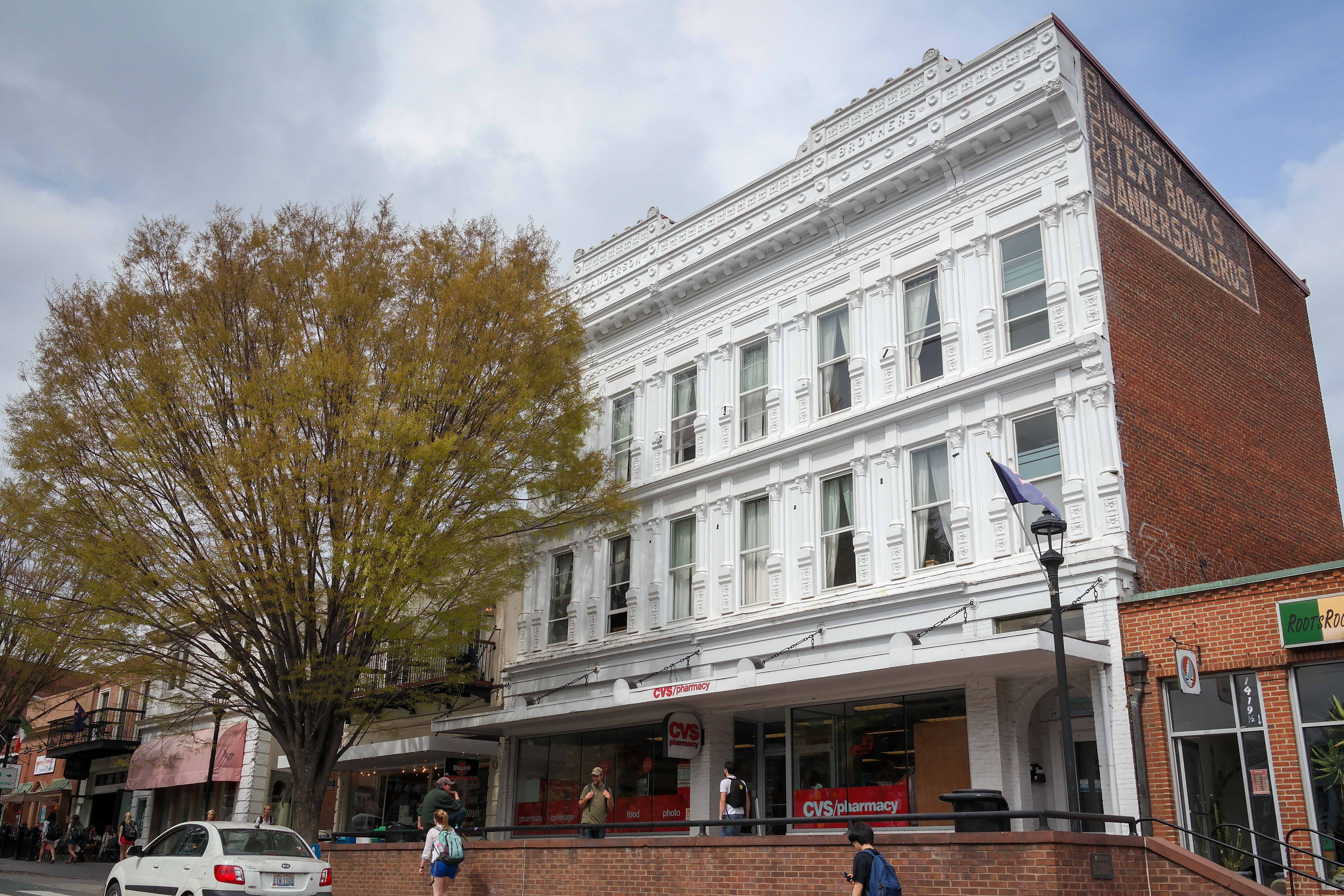
- The Anderson Brothers Building at University Corner in Charlottesville

- Location within Virginia Location within the United States
- Location: 1417-1427 University Ave., Charlottesville, Virginia
- Coordinates: 38°2′5″N 78°30′1″W
- Area: less than one acre
- Built: 1848, 1890-1891
- Architectural style: Late Victorian
- Part of: Rugby Road-University Corner Historic District (ID84003523)
- MPS: Charlottesville MRA
- NRHP reference No.: 82001797
- VLR No.: 104-0132

Significant dates
- Added to NRHP: October 21, 1982
- Designated VLR: October 20, 1981

Anderson Brothers Building, also known as Anderson Brothers Book Store, is a historic commercial building located at Charlottesville, Virginia. The original section was built in 1848, and expanded to its present size in 1890–1891. It is a three-story, seven bay Late Victorian style building. It is constructed of brick and has a metal clad facade.

It was listed on the National Register of Historic Places in 1982. It is located in the Rugby Road-University Corner Historic District.
