= Harris Farm (Albemarle County, Virginia) =

Historic house in Virginia, United States

- U.S. National Register of Historic Places
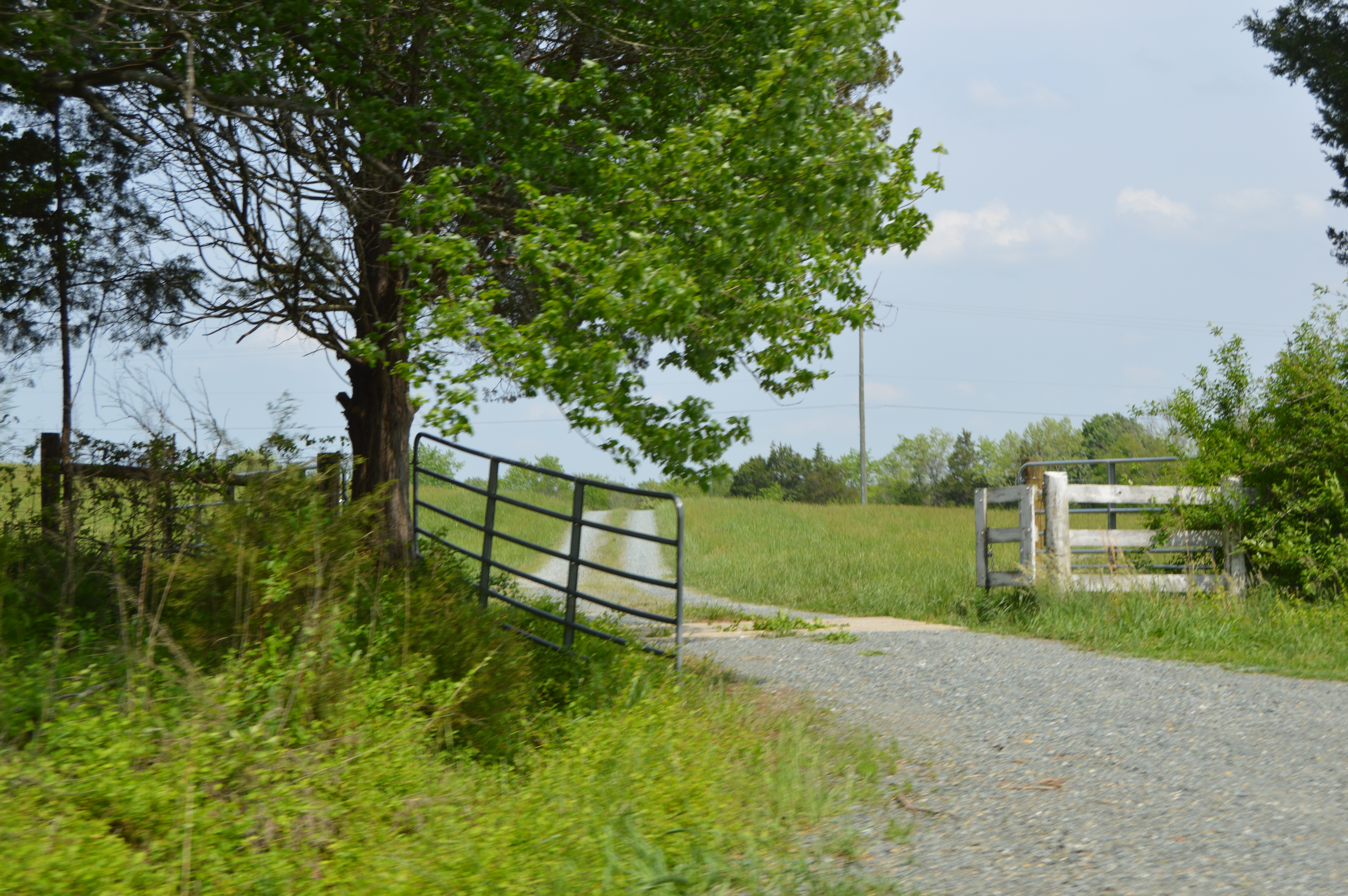
- Entrance to the farm

- Location within Virginia Location within the United States
- Location: 2950 Thomas Jefferson Pkwy., near Charlottesville, Virginia
- Coordinates: 37°57′46″N 78°22′47″W
- Area: 211 acres (85 ha)
- Built: 1850
- Architectural style: Greek Revival
- NRHP reference No.: 15000249
- Added to NRHP: May 18, 2015

Harris Farm is a historic farm property at 2950 Thomas Jefferson Highway (Virginia State Route 53), in rural eastern Albemarle County, Virginia. The farm, more than 200 acres (81 ha) in size, fronts on both the Rivanna River (east) and Buck Island Creek (south), with the access drive to the main complex on the east side of the road. The centerpiece of the farm complex is a farmhouse whose oldest portion is a Greek Revival I-house built about 1850 by Robert Gentry. In 1898 the house was sold to Hilton Ashby Harris, who increased the house's size by building a second I-house directly attached to the front of the first. A cross-gabled rear projecting ell was added at some time in the early 20th century. The house represents a creative adaptation of traditional housing forms, as well as exemplifying changing construction techniques associated with those forms.

The farm property was added to the National Register of Historic Places in 2015.

== See also ==
- National Register of Historic Places listings in Albemarle County, Virginia
