= Pantops Farm =

Historic house in Virginia, United States

- U.S. National Register of Historic Places
- Virginia Landmarks Register
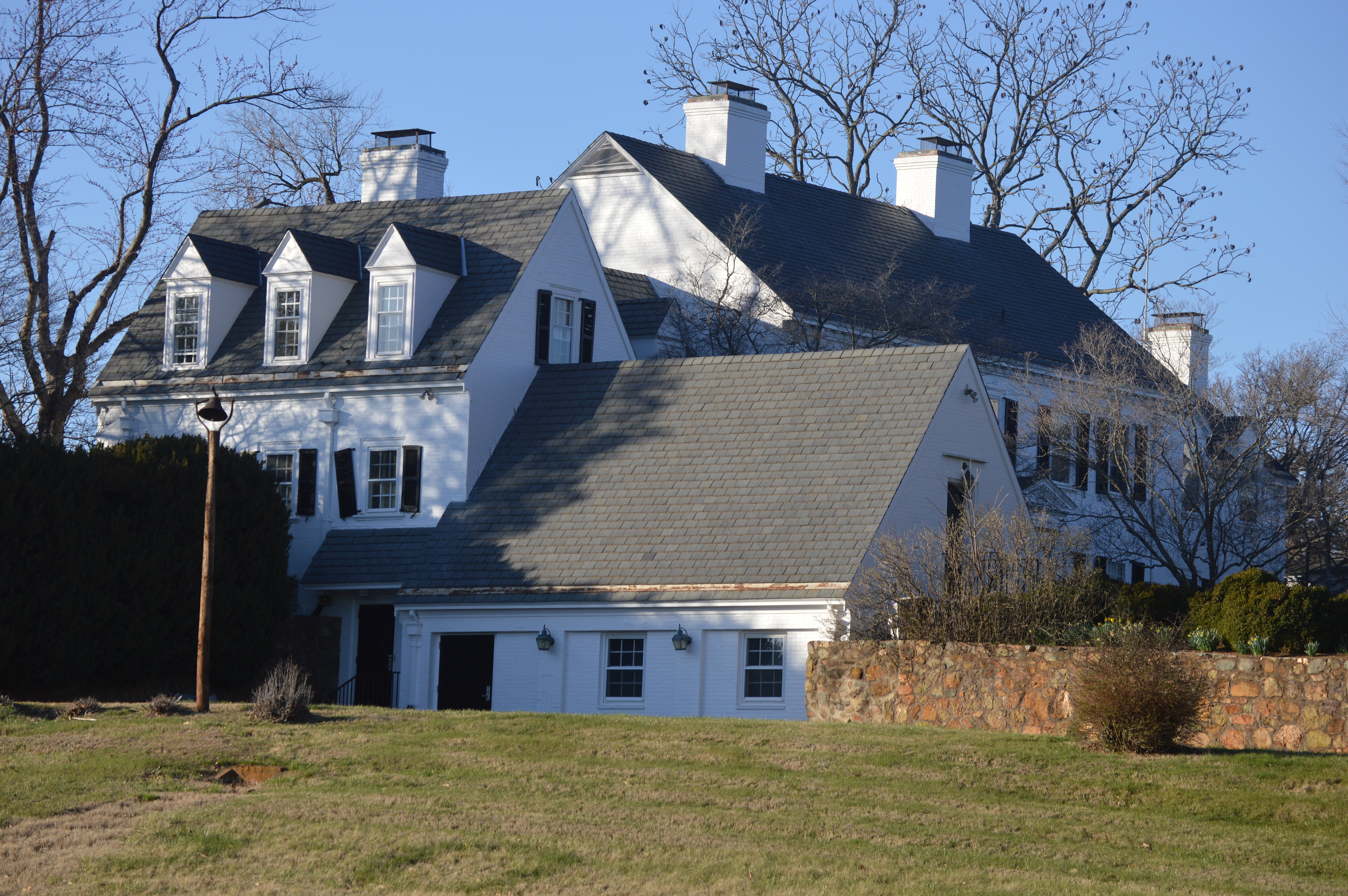
- Southern side and front

- Location within Virginia
- Location: 400 Peter Jefferson Road, Charlottesville, Virginia
- Coordinates: 38.024988°N 78.441914°W
- Area: 4.5 acres (1.8 ha)
- Built: 1937
- Architect: Benjamin Charles Baker
- NRHP reference No.: 05000483
- VLR No.: 002-0130
- Added to NRHP: May 7, 2014

Pantops Farm is a historic house at 400 Peter Jefferson Road near Charlottesville, Virginia. The property was listed on the National Register of Historic Places in 2014.

== History ==
It consists of a Colonial Revival main house, a guest house, and a building resembling a silo in appearance. This complex was designed by Benjamin Charles Barker and built in 1937 for James Cheek, whose family made its fortune in Maxwell House coffee. Its buildings, in particular the guest house and silo, were designed to appear as if they were older buildings that had been repurposed. The property is a small remnant of an estate that was once owned by Thomas Jefferson. It is now owned by the University of Virginia; the main house now holds the Thomas Jefferson Center for the Protection of Free Expression and the Kluge-Ruhe Aboriginal Art Collection. The property was given its name by Jefferson: pant-ops are Greek words meaning "all seeing", alluding to the property's expansive views of the surrounding countryside.

== See also ==
- National Register of Historic Places listings in Albemarle County, Virginia
