= Thomas Jefferson Center for the Protection of Free Expression =

American institution, 1989–2019

The Thomas Jefferson Center for the Protection of Free Expression was a nonprofit, nonpartisan institution devoted to the defense of the First Amendment rights guaranteeing freedom of speech and of the press. The center was founded in 1989, under the direction of former University of Virginia president Robert M. O'Neil. J. Joshua Wheeler succeeded O'Neil as Director of the Center in 2011. It is named after Founding Father and third president of the United States, Thomas Jefferson.

The Center managed a number of programs and activities to fulfill its mission, including the drafting of amicus curiae briefs in support of First Amendment litigants, congressional testimony, educational programs, artistic exhibitions and prizes, and the Jefferson Muzzles awards. It also partnered with the Ford Foundation on a program called “Difficult Dialogues, about free speech on campus. The center was located at Pantops Farm, a property in Charlottesville, Virginia that was once owned personally by Jefferson.

In 2019, the Center's Board of Directors donated $1 million in assets to the University of Virginia Law School's First Amendment Clinic, effectively ending its existence.
