= Lewis Mountain =

Historic house in Virginia, United States

- U.S. National Register of Historic Places
- Virginia Landmarks Register
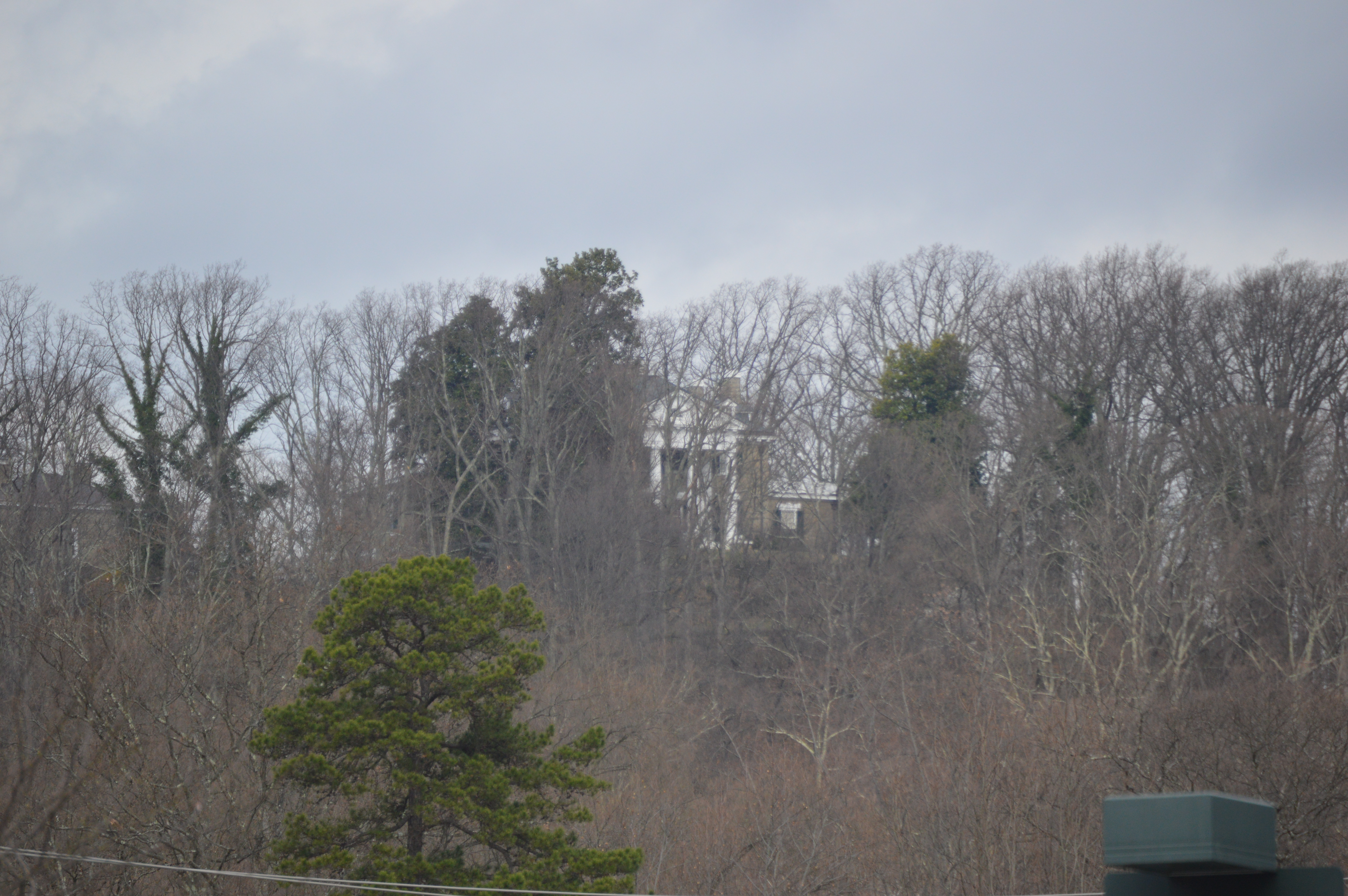
- Distant view from below

- Location within Virginia Location within the United States
- Location: 1 Lewis Mountain Pkwy, near Charlottesville, Virginia
- Coordinates: 38°2′29″N 78°31′19″W
- Area: 42.3 acres (17.1 ha)
- Built: 1909-1912
- Architect: Eugene Bradbury, Warren H. Manning
- Architectural style: Colonial Revival
- NRHP reference No.: 09001052
- VLR No.: 002-0923

Significant dates
- Added to NRHP: December 7, 2009
- Designated VLR: September 17, 2009

Lewis Mountain, also known as Onteora, is a historic home located near Charlottesville, Albemarle County, Virginia. It was designed in 1909, and completed in 1912. The house is a three-part plan granite dwelling, consisting of a nearly square center section flanked by one-story, flat-roofed wings in the Colonial Revival style. It features a massive wooden cornice employing a simplified version of the Roman Doric order of Vignola, a deck-on-hip roof with pedimented dormers at its base, and a portico with four Doric order columns. It also has a one-story, tetrastyle Tuscan portico that serves as a porte cochere. The steeply sloped property features a landscape designed by Warren H. Manning with a series of three terraces with tall dry-laid stone retaining walls.

An urban legend states that the house, which overlooks the campus of the University of Virginia (whose students are nicknamed "Hoos"), inspired Dr. Seuss to create the character of the Grinch, who scornfully looks down upon the "Whos" from his mountaintop residence.

It was added to the National Register of Historic Places in 2009.
