= Woodlands (Charlottesville, Virginia) =

Historic house in Virginia, United States

- U.S. National Register of Historic Places
- Virginia Landmarks Register
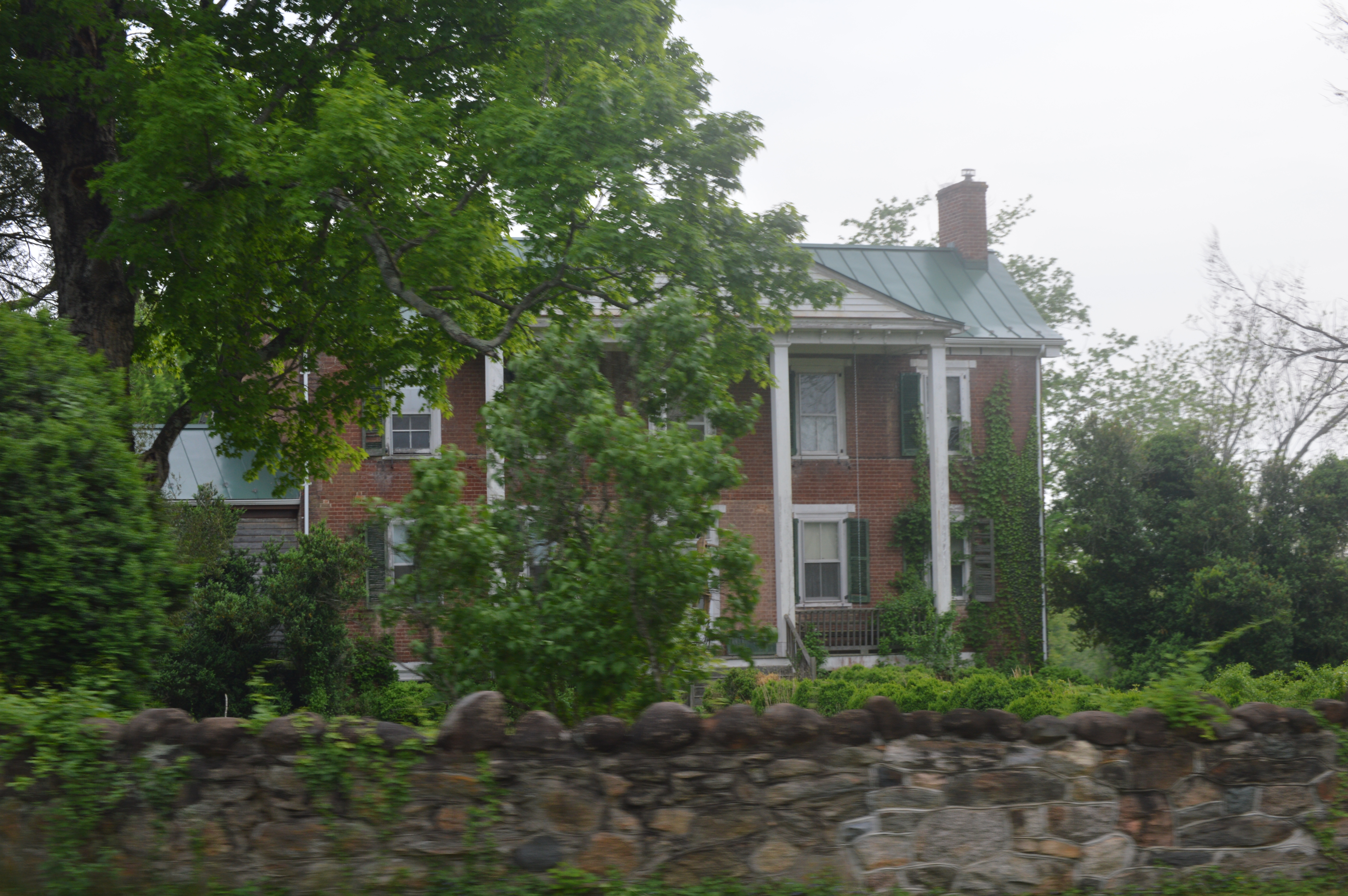
- Front of the house

- Location within Virginia Location within the United States
- Location: Woodlands Road, near Charlottesville, Virginia
- Coordinates: 38°6′6″N 78°30′15″W
- Area: 270.5 acres (109.5 ha)
- Built: 1842-1843
- Built by: Patrick Martin, James H. Ward
- Architectural style: Greek Revival, Federal
- NRHP reference No.: 89001931
- VLR No.: 002-0621

Significant dates
- Added to NRHP: November 2, 1989
- Designated VLR: April 18, 1989

Woodlands is a historic home and farm complex located near Charlottesville, Albemarle County, Virginia. The main block was built in 1842–1843, and is a brick I-house with Federal detailing. It was expanded in the 1890s by a two-story frame-and-brick rear "T" with one- and two-story wraparound verandahs. Also on the property is a tall, narrow frame barn, dated to the 1840s, and later farm buildings erected in the 1910s and '20s including a frame dairy barn, a glazed-tile silo, and a stone-and-frame horse barn.

It was added to the National Register of Historic Places in 1989.
