= Southern Albemarle Rural Historic District =

Historic district in Virginia, United States

- U.S. National Register of Historic Places
- U.S. Historic district
- Virginia Landmarks Register
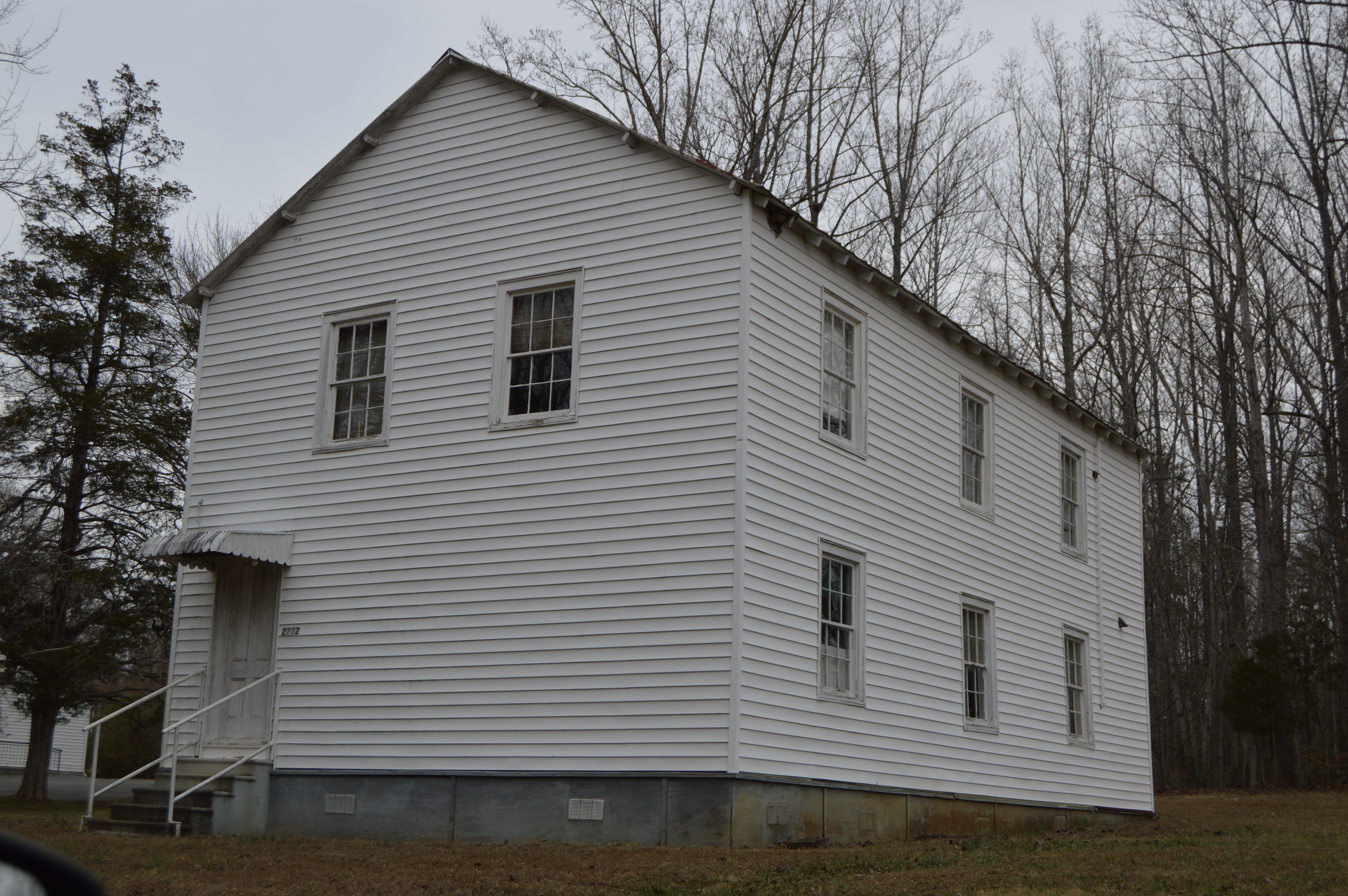
- Masonic building at Alberene and Plank Roads

- Location within Virginia Location within the United States
- Location: Roughly bounded by the Rivanna River, Virginia State Route 20, Green Mt., James River, Blenheim, Jefferson Mill Rolling & Milton Rds. & Monroe Parkway, near Charlottesville, Virginia
- Coordinates: 37°52′22″N 78°31′02″W
- Area: 83,627 acres (33,843 ha)
- Built: 1729
- Architect: multiple
- Architectural style: Georgian, Federal, et al.
- NRHP reference No.: 07001236
- VLR No.: 002-5045

Significant dates
- Added to NRHP: November 28, 2007
- Designated VLR: June 6, 2007

Southern Albemarle Rural Historic District is a national historic district located near Charlottesville, Albemarle County, Virginia. The district encompasses 1,284 contributing buildings, 96 contributing sites, 486 contributing structures, and 3 contributing objects. It includes a variety of large farms, historic villages, and crossroads communities. The district includes 23 properties previously listed on the National Register of Historic Places.

It was added to the National Register of Historic Places in 2007.
