= Enniscorthy (Ellicott City, Maryland) =

Historic house in Maryland, United States

- U.S. National Register of Historic Places
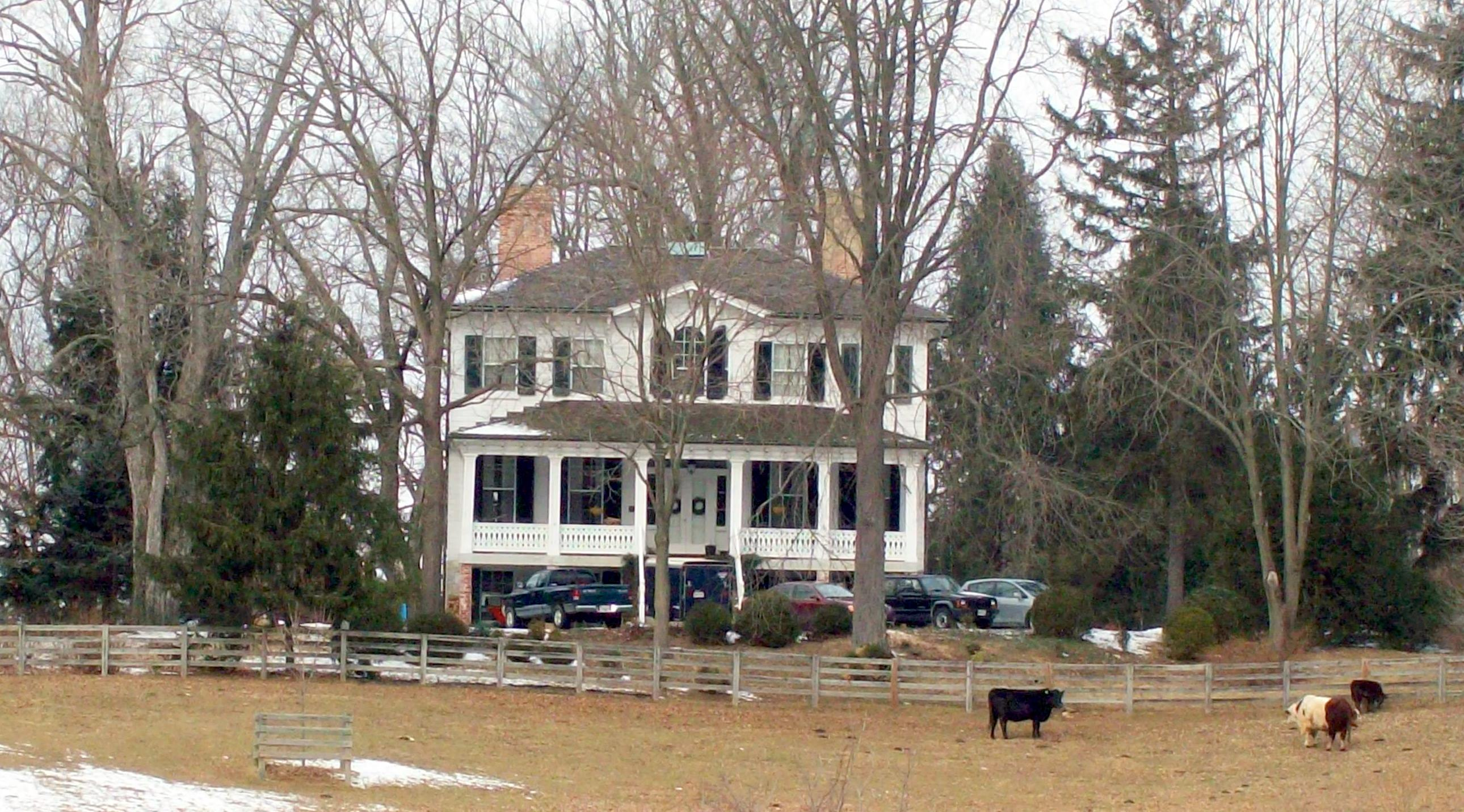
- Enniscorthy, January 2011

- Location within Maryland Location within the United States
- Location: 3412 Folly Quarter Rd., Ellicott City, Maryland
- Coordinates: 39°16′42″N 76°54′12″W
- Area: 15.6 acres (6.3 ha)
- Built: 1860
- Architectural style: Italianate
- NRHP reference No.: 86001019
- Added to NRHP: May 8, 1986

Enniscorthy is a historic home located at Ellicott City, Howard County, Maryland. It is a large Italianate-influenced frame house constructed about 1860.

It was listed on the National Register of Historic Places in 1986.
