= Birdwood, Nebraska =

Unincorporated community in Nebraska, United States

- Unincorporated community
- Location within Nebraska Location within the United States
- Coordinates: 41.2°N 100.9°W
- Country: United States
- State: Nebraska
- County: Lincoln

Birdwood is an unincorporated community in Lincoln County, Nebraska, United States.

== History ==
A post office was established at Birdwood in 1888, and remained in operation until it was discontinued in 1896. The community was named from the Birdwood Creek nearby.
