= Warren, Virginia =

Unincorporated community in Virginia, United States

Warren
- Unincorporated community
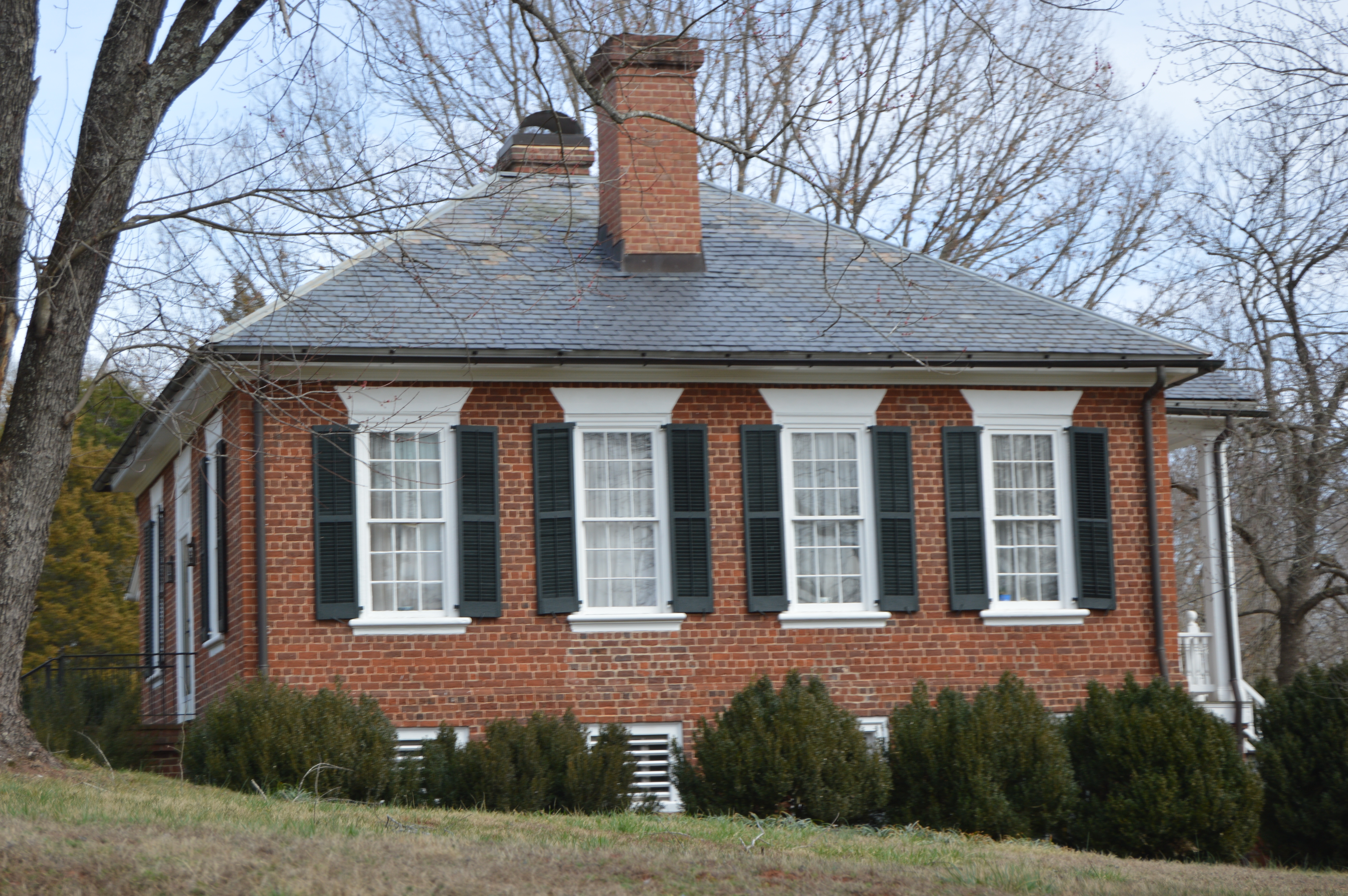
- The Walker House, built circa 1803

- Location within the Commonwealth of Virginia Warren (the United States)
- Coordinates: 37°45′58″N 78°33′28″W
- Country: United States
- State: Virginia
- County: Albemarle
- Time zone: UTC−5 (Eastern (EST))
  - Summer (DST): UTC−4 (EDT)
- GNIS feature ID: 1494290

Warren is an unincorporated community in Albemarle County, Virginia, United States.

Walker House was added to the National Register of Historic Places in 1990.
