= Rugby Road–University Corner Historic District =

Historic district in Virginia, United States

- U.S. National Register of Historic Places
- U.S. Historic district
- Virginia Landmarks Register
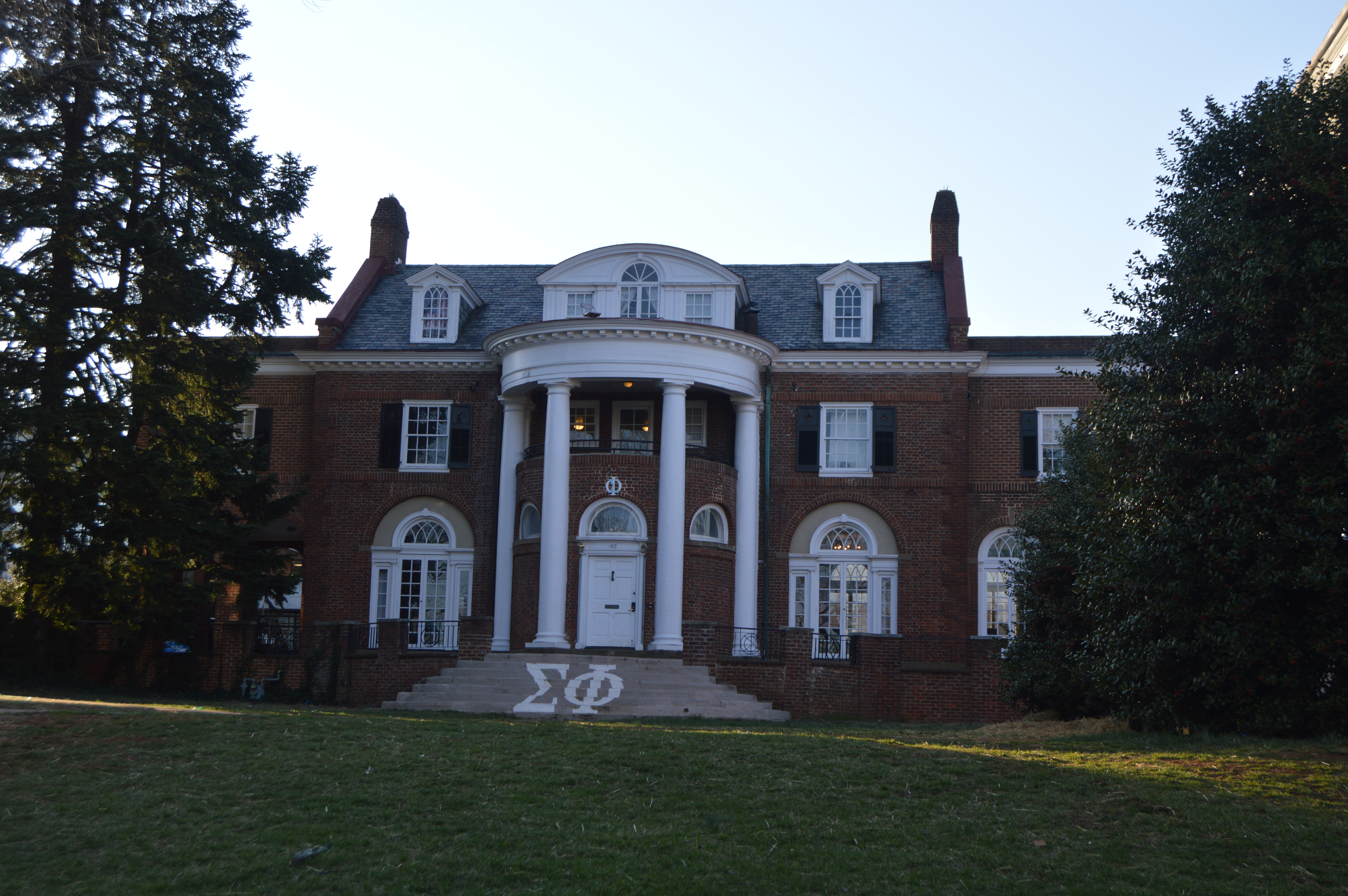
- ΣΦ fraternity house on Rugby Road

- Location within Virginia Location within the United States
- Location: Roughly bounded by University Ave., Wayside Pl., 14th St., and US 29, Charlottesville, Virginia
- Coordinates: 38°2′23″N 78°30′05″W
- Area: 84 acres (34 ha)
- Built: 1890
- Architect: Multiple
- Architectural style: Colonial Revival, Bungalow/craftsman
- NRHP reference No.: 84003523
- VLR No.: 104-0133

Significant dates
- Added to NRHP: February 16, 1984
- Designated VLR: November 15, 1983

Rugby Road–University Corner Historic District is a national historic district located at Charlottesville, Virginia. The district encompasses 173 contributing buildings in the city of Charlottesville. It includes a variety of commercial, residential, and institutional structures mirroring the University of Virginia's development between the 1890s and the Great Depression. It includes properties on Carr's Hill. Notable buildings include the Chancellor Building (1920), the Minor Court Building (1896 and 1927), Mincer's Shop Building 1920s), the Stevens-Shepherd Building (c. 1925), Buckingham Palace (c. 1850s), St. Paul's Episcopal Church (1926–27), Madison Hall (1905), fraternity houses dating from 1902 to 1928, Fayerweather Hall (1893), the Bayly Museum (1934), Faculty Apartments building (c. 1920), Watts-Hillel House (1913-1914), and Hotopp-Watson House (1900). Also located in the district are the separately listed Anderson Brothers Building, Preston Court Apartments, and Wynhurst.

It was listed on the National Register of Historic Places in 1984.
