= Farmington (Albemarle County, Virginia) =

Historic house in Virginia, United States

- U.S. National Register of Historic Places
- Virginia Landmarks Register
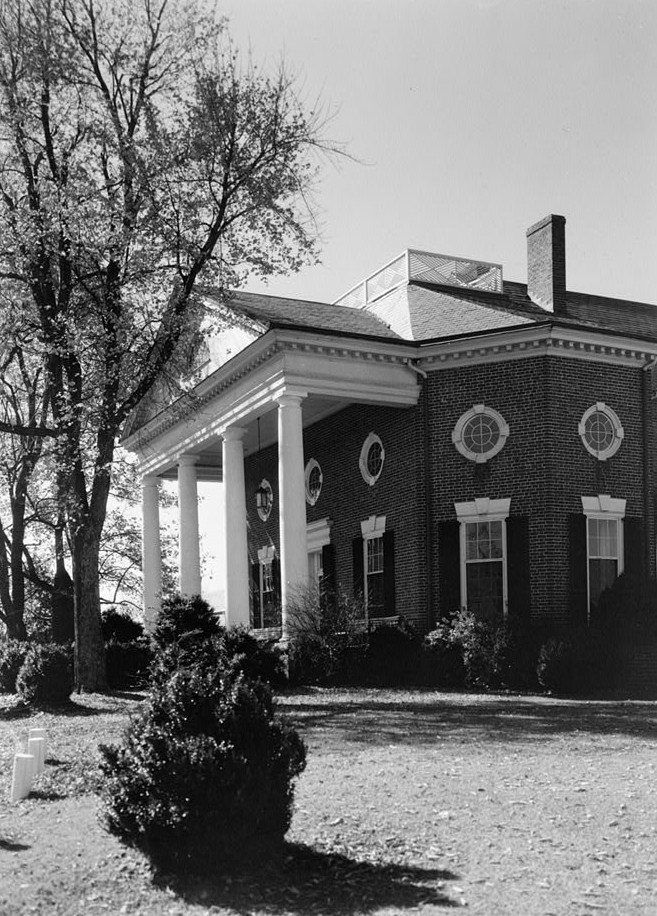
- Farmington, HABS Photo

- Location within Virginia Location within the United States
- Location: West of the junction of US 250 and US 29, Charlottesville, Virginia
- Coordinates: 38°03′44.27″N 78°32′30.10″W
- Area: 10 acres (4.0 ha)
- Built: 1780
- Architect: Thomas Jefferson
- Architectural style: Early Republic, Jeffersonian
- NRHP reference No.: 70000782
- VLR No.: 002-0035

Significant dates
- Added to NRHP: September 15, 1970
- Designated VLR: July 7, 1970

Farmington is a house near Charlottesville, in Albemarle County, Virginia, that was greatly expanded to designs by Thomas Jefferson and carried out while he was President of the United States. The original house was built in the mid-18th century for Francis Jerdone on a 1,753-acre (709 ha) property. Jerdone sold the land and house to George Divers, a friend of Jefferson, in 1785. In 1802, Divers asked Jefferson to design an expansion of the house. The house, since greatly enlarged, is now a clubhouse.

== Description ==
The Jefferson addition comprises the present building's main facade, consisting of an elongated octagon with its long axis perpendicular to the large tetrastyle Tuscan portico. The original house was a two-story, three-bay brick house over a basement with a side-hall plan. There were two rooms above and below. Jefferson's addition is to the east. The addition's portico extends for two stories in front of three main bays, with the entry door centered, flanked by typical Jefferson triple-hung windows extending to the floor. The door and windows are crowned by round windows lighting the upper level. To either side are projecting half-octagon wings with windows matching the central portion. In Jefferson's design and as built, the long octagon was divided into two unequal rooms. The interior was greatly altered following a mid-19th century fire, with the creation of a central hall and a second floor over all. When the property became a country club the second floor was removed in 1929 and the three spaces were combined into a single space. The house was greatly enlarged to the rear with service, dining and accommodation spaces.

== Influence ==
Farmington was extensively studied by University of Virginia architectural historian Fiske Kimball, who adapted the design for his own residence, Shack Mountain, now a National Historic Landmark.

Farmington was placed on the National Register of Historic Places on September 15, 1970.
