= Proffit Historic District =

Historic district in Virginia, United States

- U.S. National Register of Historic Places
- U.S. Historic district
- Virginia Landmarks Register
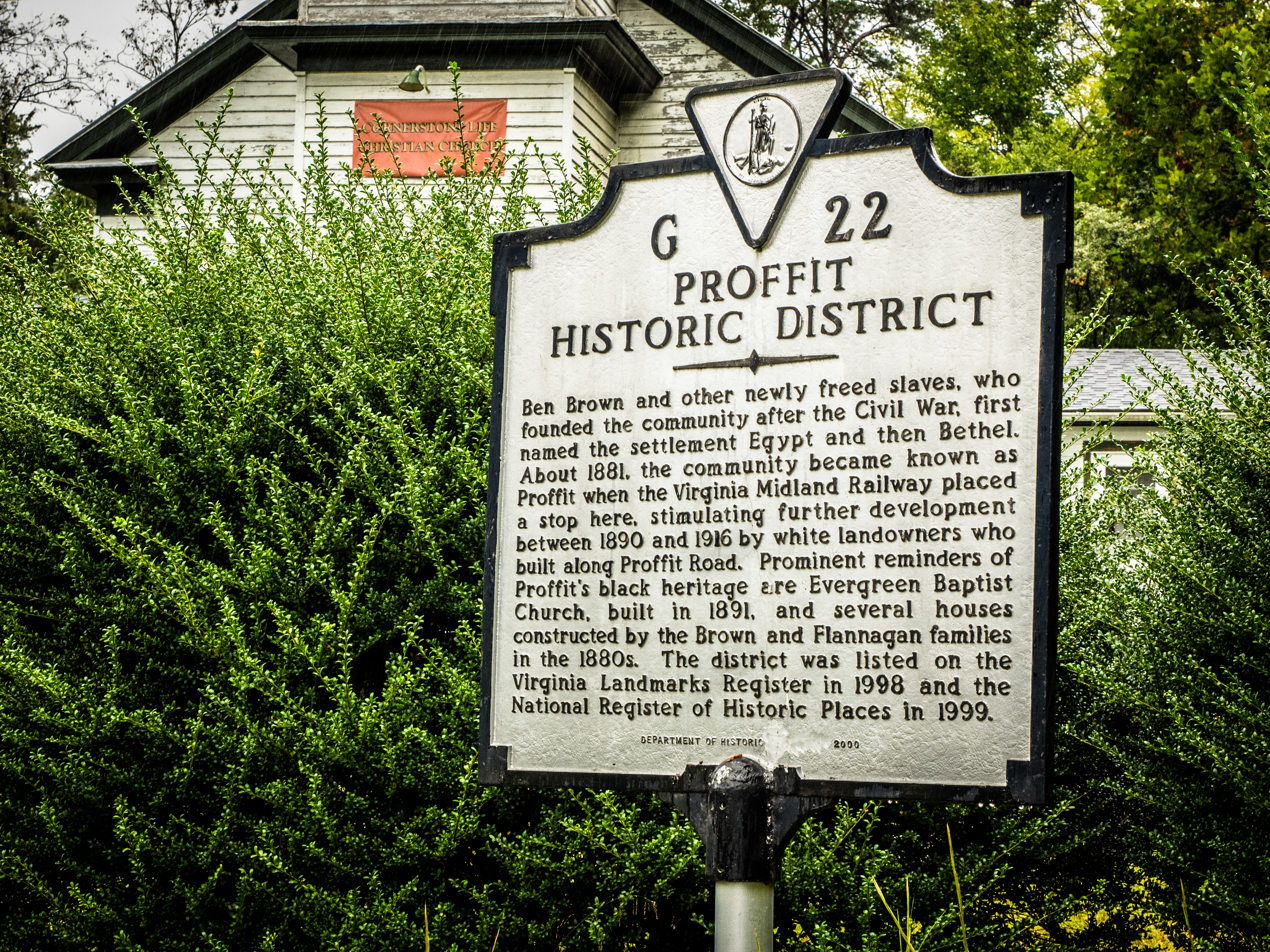
- Historic marker for the Proffit Historic District

- Location within Virginia Location within the United States
- Location: Roughly the area around the junction of the Southern Railroad tracks and VA 649, Proffit, Virginia
- Coordinates: 38°6′36″N 78°25′26″W
- Built: 1871
- Architect: Brown, Ned; Cox, Elijah, et al.
- Architectural style: Colonial Revival, Late Gothic Revival
- NRHP reference No.: 99000145
- VLR No.: 002-5019

Significant dates
- Added to NRHP: February 5, 1999
- Designated VLR: September 14, 1998

The Proffit Historic District is a national historic district located at Proffit, Albemarle County, Virginia. It encompasses 26 contributing buildings and 3 contributing sites in the historic center of Proffit. Notable buildings and sites includes Evergreen Baptist Church, the Proffit Station Master's House, remains of the first Proffit Post Office, the Proffit Road Bridge, and several houses built by African-American families as far back as the 1880s.

Proffit's history dates back to the 1870s when two former slaves, John Coles and Benjamin Brown, purchased some land from former slaveholder W.G. Carr. In 1876 Ned Brown purchased seventy-five acres in the area as well. Its settlement began and the community thrived.

Proffit is noted as one of the few African American communities in Albemarle County to survive after the American Civil War. Today it is a quiet residential area whose backbone is the Evergreen Baptist Church. The Church was built in 1891 by its first pastor, Reverend D.L. Gofney, and continues to be significantly involved in this historic community today.

The historic district was added to the National Register of Historic Places in 1999.
