= Crossroads Tavern (Crossroads, Virginia) =

Historic commercial building in Virginia, United States

- U.S. National Register of Historic Places
- Virginia Landmarks Register
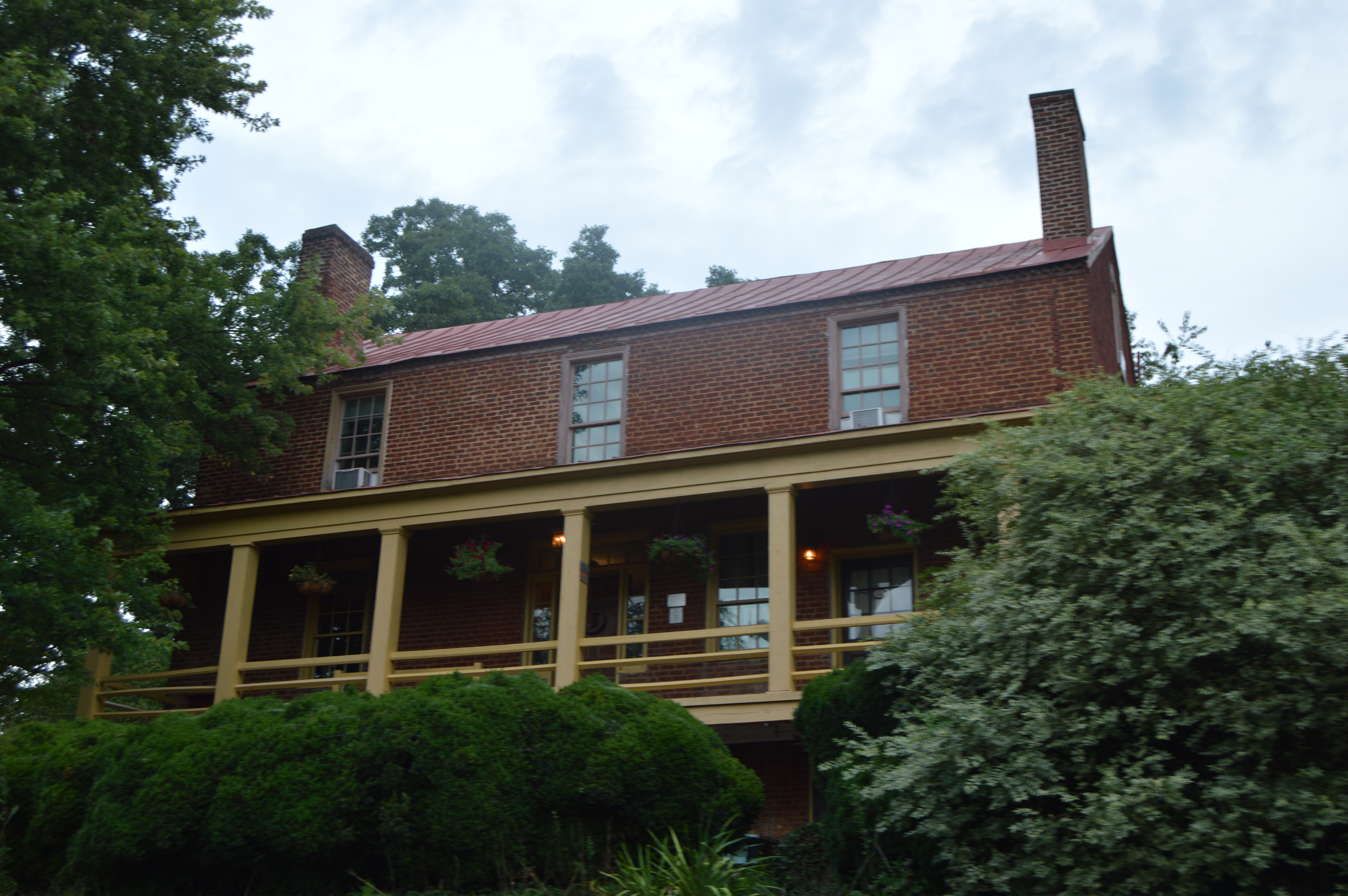
- Front of the tavern

- Location within Virginia Location within the United States
- Location: VA 692, Crossroads, Virginia
- Coordinates: 37°57′26″N 78°39′39″W
- Area: 1.8 acres (0.73 ha)
- Built: c. 1820
- NRHP reference No.: 84003481
- VLR No.: 002-0199

Significant dates
- Added to NRHP: August 16, 1984
- Designated VLR: May 15, 1984

Crossroads Tavern, also known as Crossroads Inn, is a historic inn and tavern located at North Garden, Albemarle County, Virginia. It was built about 1820. In the mid nineteenth century, Clifton G. Sutherland, son of Joseph Sutherland, owned and ran the tavern which was located on the Staunton and James River Turnpike. It served as a tavern and overnight lodging for farmers and travelers using the turnpike. In 1889, Daniel B. Landes bought the land at the public auction of the estate of Clifton Sutherland. The property continued to be conveyed to various owners over the years. The Crossroads Tavern is an early nineteenth century two- to three-story, three-bay, double pile brick structure. The building sits on top of a brick and stone foundation, is roofed with tin and has pairs of interior brick chimneys on either gable end. The brick is laid in five course American bond with Flemish variant. Windows on the basement level at the rear of the house (north side) are barred; other basement windows are nine-over-six sash. Put-holes are found at the west end of the building, formerly providing sockets for scaffold boards should repairs be necessary. The front facade is dominated by a porch on the second story extending the entire width of the south and east facades. It is supported by five rounded brick columns and the tin roof above is supported by simple square wooden pillars connected by horizontal rails. Doors of the front of the basement level open respectively into kitchen and dining room and into a spirits cellar with its original barrel racks as well as a laundry fireplace. Floors on this level were originally dirt but dining room and kitchen floors have been cemented. The main entrance door on the second level, with its multi-panes lights, opens onto a central stair hall with two main rooms on either side. This stair hall has an ascending stair at its front and both ascending and descending stairs toward its center. Formerly the ascending stairs led to upstairs areas which did not connect. There is no ridge pole in the three attic rooms. The interiors of windows and doors on the main entrance side have extremely long wooden lintels. With few exceptions, the interior woodwork is original, including floors, chair rails, mantels and built in cupboards. Also on the property is a two-story contributing summer kitchen, brick up to the second story and frame above, and with an exterior brick chimney at the rear gable with fireplaces on both floors. It is operated as a bed and breakfast.

It was added to the National Register of Historic Places in 1984. The Crossroads Tavern Inn is also part of the Southern Albemarle Rural Historic District.
