= Kenridge =

Historic house in Virginia, United States

- U.S. National Register of Historic Places
- Virginia Landmarks Register
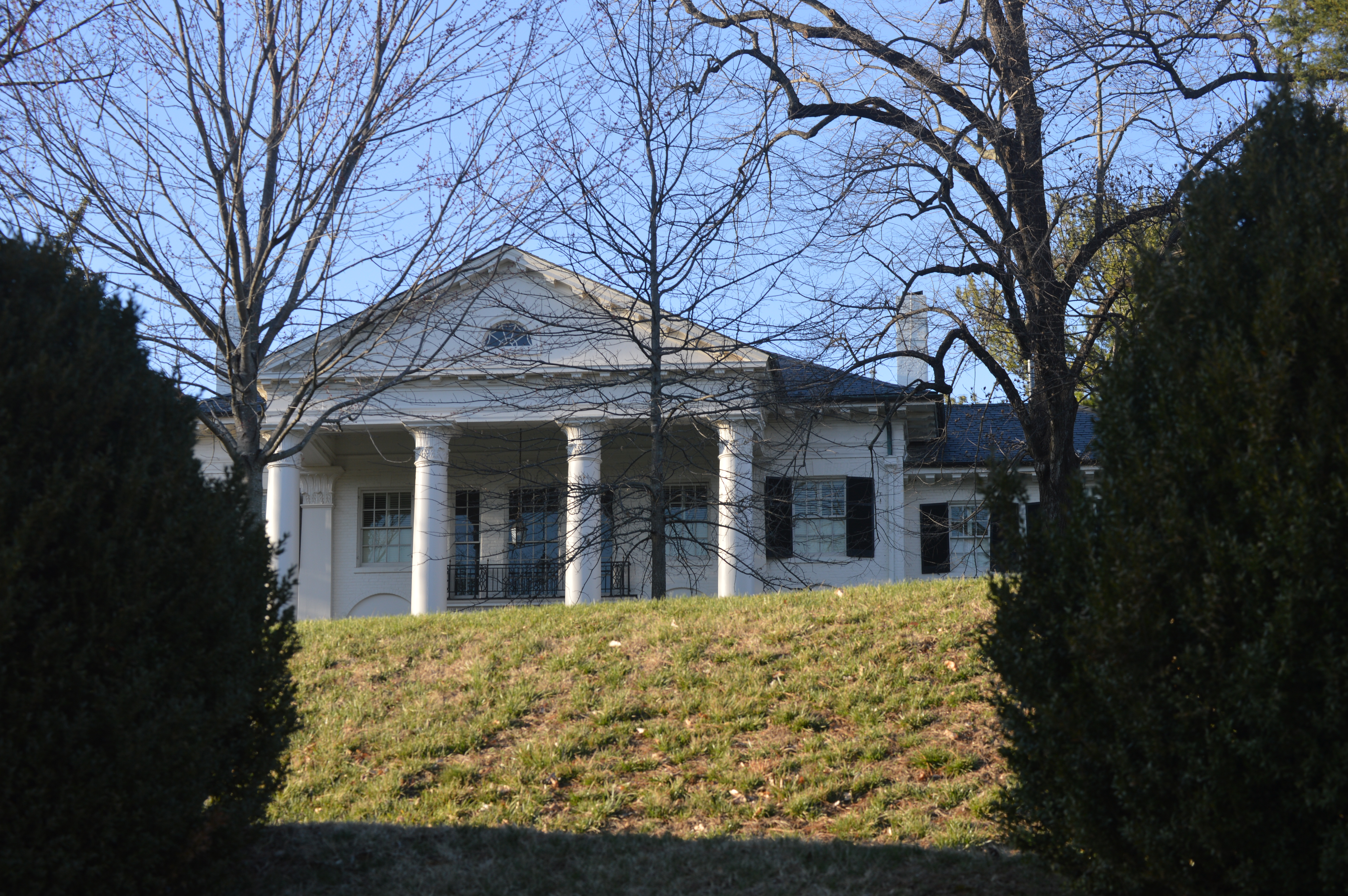
- Front

- Location within Virginia Location within the United States
- Location: 912 Marsh Ln., near Charlottesville, Virginia
- Coordinates: 38°3′17″N 78°32′0″W
- Area: 1.8 acres (0.73 ha)
- Built: 1922
- Built by: Hollis Rinehart, Sr.
- Architect: William J. Marsh
- Architectural style: Classical Revival
- NRHP reference No.: 08000416
- VLR No.: 002-0919

Significant dates
- Added to NRHP: May 15, 2008
- Designated VLR: March 20, 2008

Kenridge, also known as Colridge, is a historic home located near Charlottesville, Albemarle County, Virginia. It was built in 1922, and is a three-part plan dwelling, consisting of a two-story, five-bay, main block flanked by one-story wings in the Classical Revival style. The house is built from hollow vitreous tiles faced with Flemish bond brickwork. The sections are topped by slate-covered hipped roofs. It features a monumental two-story, tetrastyle portico with colossal Tower of the Winds columns on the front facade.

It was added to the National Register of Historic Places in 2008.
