= Woodburn, Nova Scotia =

Community in Nova Scotia, Canada

Coordinates: 45.618°N 62.522°W

Woodburn is a community in the Canadian province of Nova Scotia, located in Pictou County.

== Location ==
This settlement is located at the west end of Merigomish Harbour, on the north shore of Nova Scotia.

== History ==
John Wood received a grant of land here in 1810, and the Scottish word, "burn" means rivulet or brook, hence its name "Woods Brook."
