= Walker House (Warren, Virginia) =

Historic house in Virginia, United States

- U.S. National Register of Historic Places
- Virginia Landmarks Register
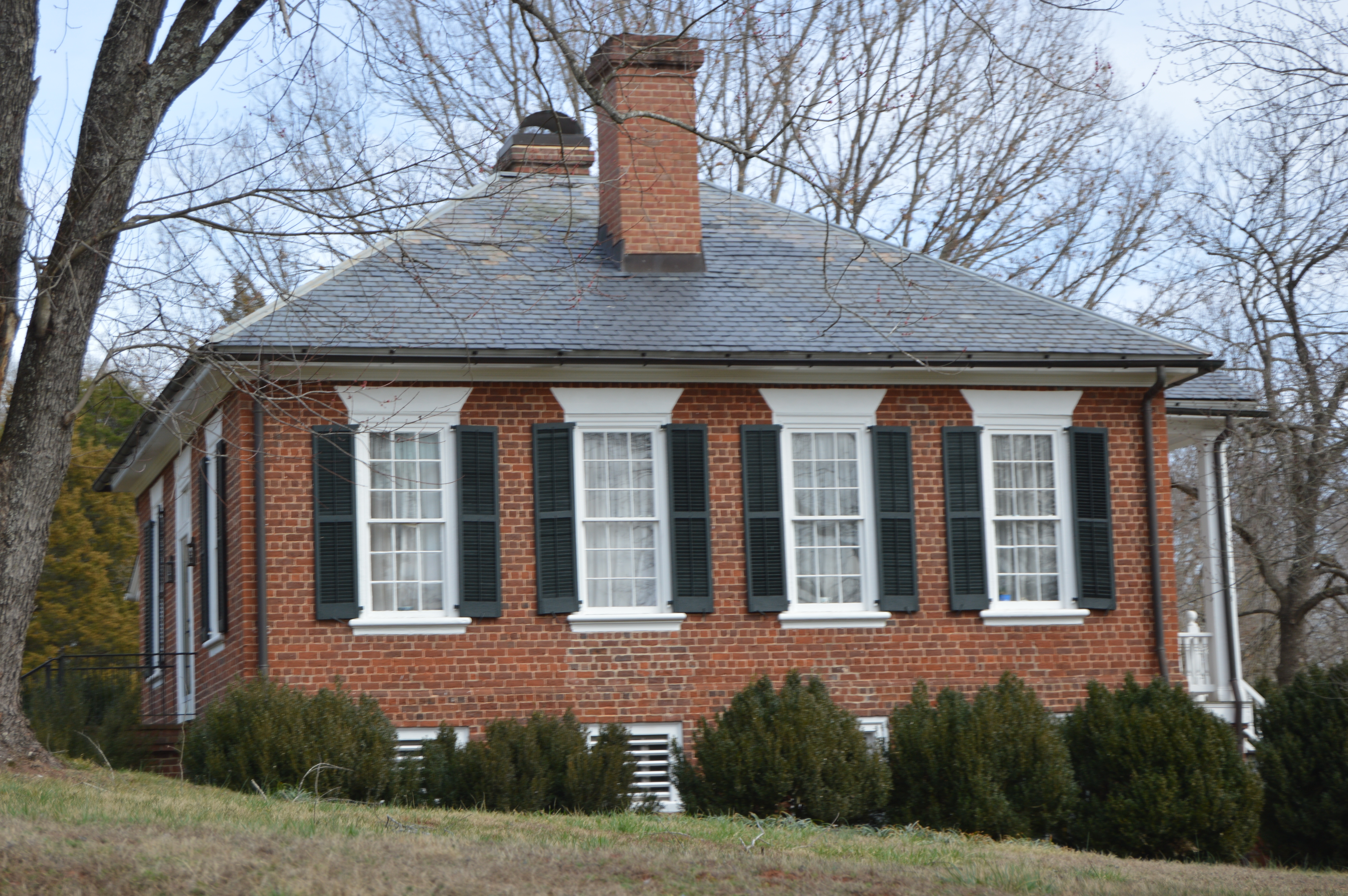
- Western side and rear of the house

- Location within Virginia Location within the United States
- Location: VA 627 south of the junction with VA 726, Warren, Virginia
- Coordinates: 37°46′15″N 78°33′34″W
- Area: 9 acres (3.6 ha)
- Built: 1803-1805
- Built by: James Walker
- Architectural style: Early Republic, Early Classical Revival
- NRHP reference No.: 90002001
- VLR No.: 002-0197

Significant dates
- Added to NRHP: December 28, 1990
- Designated VLR: February 20, 1990

Walker House, also known as the William Walker House, is a historic home located at Warren, Albemarle County, Virginia. It was built between 1803 and 1805, and is a one-story, three-bay hipped-roof brick house on a high English basement. It has a one-story, one-bay, shed-roofed brick addition built in 1978. It was built by James Walker, a long time employee of Thomas Jefferson.

It was added to the National Register of Historic Places in 1990.
