= Bentivar =

Historic house in Virginia, United States

- U.S. National Register of Historic Places
- Virginia Landmarks Register
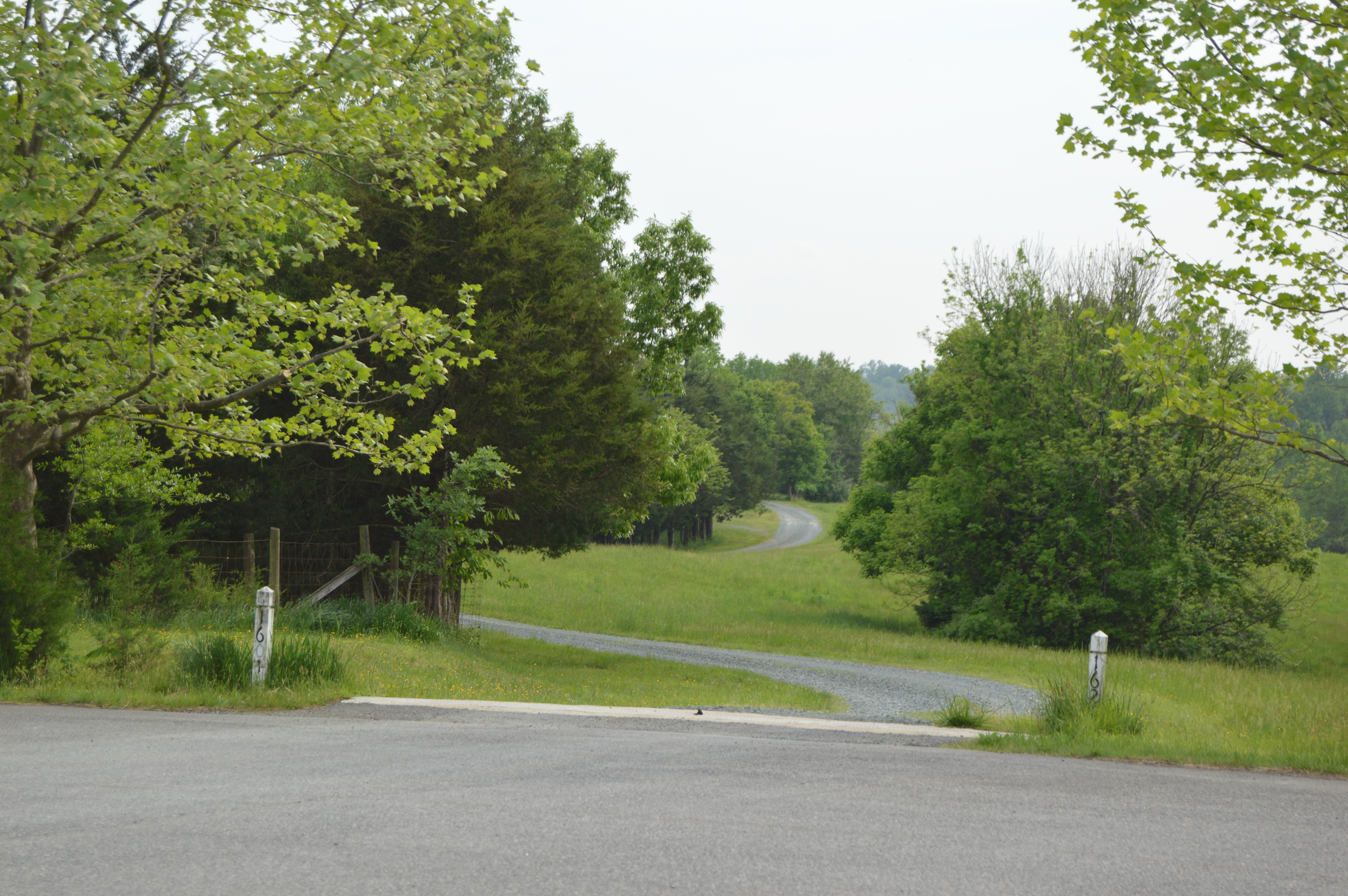
- Entrance to the estate

- Location within Virginia Location within the United States
- Location: 1601 Bentivar Farm Rd., near Charlottesville, Virginia
- Coordinates: 38°04′59″N 78°26′05″W
- Area: 19.8 acres (8.0 ha)
- Built: 1795, c. 1830
- Architect: Thomas R. Blackburn
- Architectural style: Early Republic
- NRHP reference No.: 05000333
- VLR No.: 002-0127

Significant dates
- Added to NRHP: April 20, 2005
- Designated VLR: December 1, 2004

Bentivar is a historic home and farm located near Charlottesville, Albemarle County, Virginia. It is a one-story, double-pile brick residence, with English basement and clearstory attic. It has a Palladian piano nobile plan. The traditional date for the building of Bentivar is 1795, but rebuilt about 1830 after a fire. Also on the property is a stone structure, apparently originally used as a dairy; ice pit; and graveyard.

It was added to the National Register of Historic Places in 2005.
