= Red Hills (Charlottesville, Virginia) =

Historic house in Virginia, United States

- U.S. National Register of Historic Places
- Virginia Landmarks Register
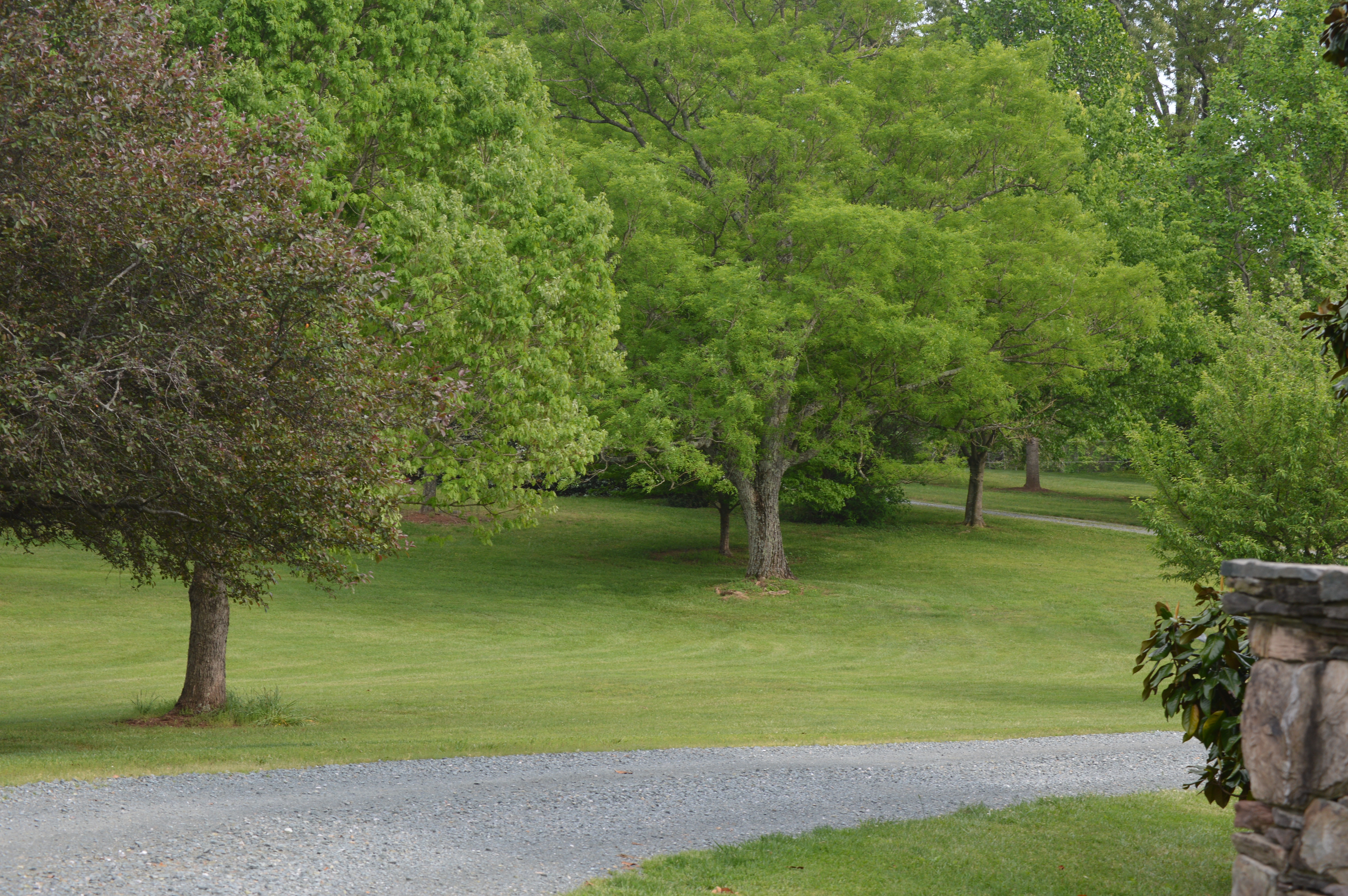
- Entrance to the estate

- Location within Virginia Location within the United States
- Location: 2051 Polo Grounds Rd., near Charlottesville, Virginia
- Coordinates: 38°05′41″N 78°25′39″W
- Area: 26.5 acres (10.7 ha)
- Built: c. 1797
- Built by: Milton L. Grigg, William Hale
- Architectural style: Georgian, Colonial Revival
- NRHP reference No.: 98000047
- VLR No.: 002-0066

Significant dates
- Added to NRHP: February 13, 1998
- Designated VLR: December 3, 1997

Red Hills is a historic home and farm complex located near Charlottesville, Albemarle County, Virginia. It consists of a two-story, five bay brick main section built about 1797 in the Georgian style, and two brick rear wings. It has a modern, one-story frame wing. The front facade features one-story, gabled portico of Colonial Revival design added about 1939. Also on the property are a contributing barn (early-20th century), corncrib and shed (early-20th century), shed (late-19th century), well (19th century), and slave cemetery (19th century).

It was added to the National Register of Historic Places in 1998.

== Slave Population ==
According to the 1850 census, Red Hills Plantation was tended by a labor force of 24 slaves; many of these slaves lie in the slave cemetery which is still a part of the Red Hills property.
