= Proffit, Virginia =

Unincorporated community in Virginia, United States

Proffit
- Unincorporated community
- Location within the Commonwealth of Virginia Proffit (the United States)
- Coordinates: 38°6′32″N 78°25′28″W
- Country: United States
- State: Virginia
- County: Albemarle
- Time zone: UTC−5 (Eastern (EST))
  - Summer (DST): UTC−4 (EDT)
- GNIS feature ID: 1477646

Proffit is an unincorporated community in Albemarle County, Virginia, United States. There is no commercial activity, with only houses lining the road and a bridge under which Norfolk Southern's Piedmont Division, Washington District line runs. It is recognized as a Virginia Landmark and the Proffit Historic District was listed on the National Register of Historic Places in 1999.

Shortly after the Civil War the village was populated entirely by African Americans, when it was known as Egypt, and then as Bethel. It became known as Proffit when the railroad line went through, named for the man who bought the right of way for the line. As it became a minor commercial hub, the population gradually became more caucasian. By the late 1920s there were only 15-20 African American families remaining in Proffit.

In 1974, the Charlottesville-Albemarle Tribune covered the Proffit Area News. The paper notes Evergreen Baptist Church as part of the community, with Rev. Blakely presiding. Pleasant Grove Baptist Church in Earlysville was also noted as hosting the Thanksgiving Union Worship Service with Rev. L.S. Ward, pastor of Chatman Grove Baptist Church, Eastham delivering the sermon. Other congregations joining this service were Evergreen at Proffit and Free Union of Stony Point. The Union Christmas service was planned to be at Evergreen Baptist that year.

The historian, Claude Hall, author of Abel Parker Upshur, was born in Proffit, and procured three degrees from the University of Virginia.
