= Advance Mills, Virginia =

Unincorporated community in Virginia, United States

Advance Mills
- Unincorporated community
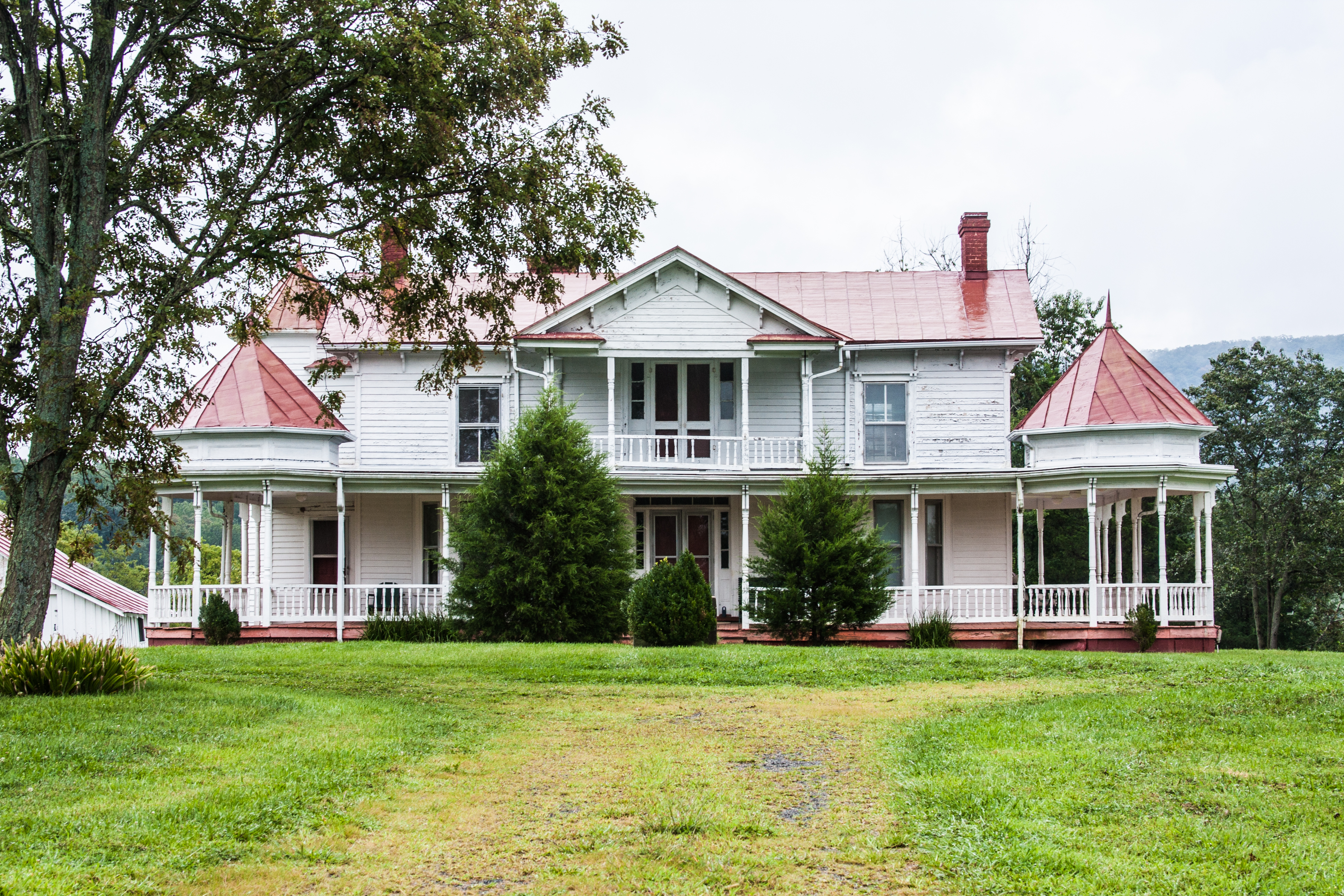
- Fray House
- Interactive map of Advance Mills
- Country: United States
- State: Virginia
- County: Albemarle
- Time zone: UTC-5 (Eastern (EST))
  - Summer (DST): UTC-4 (EDT)
- Advance Mills
- U.S. National Register of Historic Places
- U.S. Historic district
- Virginia Landmarks Register
- Location within Virginia Location within the United States
- Nearest city: Advance Mills, Virginia
- Coordinates: 38°10′59″N 78°26′19″W
- Area: 85 acres (34 ha)
- Built: 1810
- Architect: Tulloch, William; Dickerson, James
- Architectural style: Federal, Colonial Revival
- NRHP reference No.: 02000362
- VLR No.: 002-5024

Significant dates
- Added to NRHP: April 12, 2002
- Designated VLR: June 14, 2000

Advance Mills, also known as Fray's Mill, is an unincorporated community in Albemarle County, Virginia, United States.

It is a historic mill village dating from 1810. The community was built by the Fray family, who moved there in 1833. A historic district including its area was listed on the National Register of Historic Places in 2002.

The community first became known as "Advance Mills" in 1888, and the traditional story is that the name was coined by John Fray "who claimed that people frequently commented upon all the advances being made there."

The National Register-listed area is 85 acres (34 ha) and included 18 contributing buildings and 2 contributing sites and 3 contributing structures. At listing date, the district included a bridge, a dam, a millrace, and four houses.

The site of the mill and the site of a general store remain; the mill itself and the supply store were destroyed by fire in the 1940s.

Significant contributing properties in the historic district include:

- Advance Mills Bridge, crossing Rivanna River
- Advance Mills Supply building site, lying below what is now the Advance Mills Store
- Advance Mills General Store
- J. M. Fray House, the best-preserved house in the district, c. 1810
  - Schoolhouse
  - Smokehouse
  - Bank barn
  - other outbuildings
- the Gaines Fray House (II), from 1921, an American Four Square, just south of the store on west side of 743
- Gaines Fray House (I)
- A. G. Fray mill site
- Bank Barn, 1/4 mile west of Rivanna River crossing
- Ballard House, c.1900, an "I-house"
