= Birdwood (Charlottesville, Virginia) =

Historic house in Virginia, United States

- U.S. National Register of Historic Places
- Virginia Landmarks Register
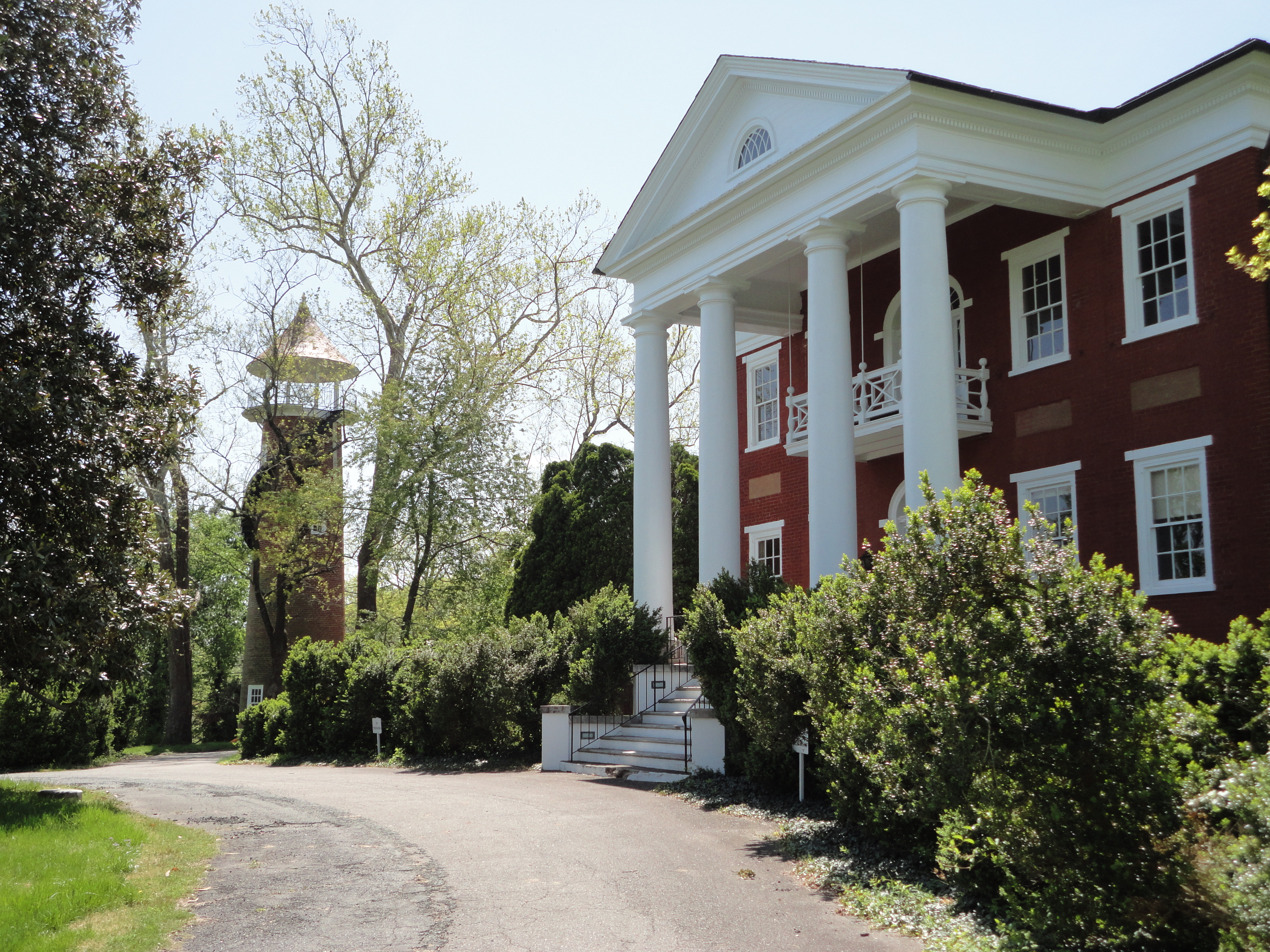
- Birdwood and water tower, April 2013

- Location within Virginia Location within the United States
- Location: 500 Birdwood Dr., near Charlottesville, Virginia
- Coordinates: 38°02′55″N 78°32′01″W
- Area: 11.7 acres (4.7 ha)
- Built: 1819-1830
- Architect: Charles Edgar and Hollis Rinehart
- Architectural style: Early Republic, Classical Revival, Jeffersonian Classicism
- NRHP reference No.: 03001094
- VLR No.: 002-0003

Significant dates
- Added to NRHP: October 23, 2003
- Designated VLR: June 18, 2003

Birdwood is a historic home located on the grounds of the University of Virginia's Birdwood Golf Course near Charlottesville, Albemarle County, Virginia. The documented history of what would come to be known as Birdwood began in the early 18th century, when David Lewis acquired the property in a 3,000-acre land grant from the Crown. Four other owners purchased several hundred acres of this grant over the next 150 years, including John Dabney in 1759, John Kerr in 1793, Hoare Browse Trist in 1800, and William Garth in 1810.

Garth built the Birdwood pavilion and four surrounding dependencies between 1819 and 1830; the entrance drive was also built at that time. It has been suggested that Thomas Jefferson's workmen may have assisted with the construction of the buildings due to the shared classical characteristics of the Birdwood structures and the contemporaneous University of Virginia pavilions. The farm was likely a thriving plantation, as Garth shared an interest in scientific agricultural practices with the local elite farming community. Garth produced tobacco, corn, wheat, wool, and butter with the help of 52 enslaved workers by 1850. The plantation was the site of horse races run by the Birdwood Jockey Club. During the Civil War, it was also the subject of a raid by General Custer in 1865.

Samuel Buck purchased the Birdwood property in 1879. The Bucks only owned the property for eleven years, but they appeared to have been active farmers. A description of the property at that time includes a mention of quarters for enslaved workers, a gardener's cottage, orchards, berry patches, a roof cistern, wine cellar, apple room, a multitude of trees representing different geographies of the U.S., a poultry yard, walnut trees, and a stocked fish pond. Buck's ownership of the property was followed by William Chamberlain's in 1891, although no information has come to light about his activities. Charles Edgar purchased Birdwood in 1903, and constructed a new underground piping system to provide water to the house and also the large building addition on the southern side of the pavilion.

Hollis Rinehart, Birdwood owner from 1909 to 1921, undertook many alterations to the property during his tenure to create the country estate character that still remains. Rinehart was a wealthy businessman and a member of the university's Board of Visitors. His alterations of the property included the construction of the stone shed and the water tower. He also installed the ornamental gardens that were later photographed by Rufus Holsinger in 1917–1918.

Holsinger's photographs documented the formal entry drive and looped access at the pavilion's front portico; the gardens; swimming pool and pool pavilion; garden pergola; garden statuary, urns, and fountain; and views into the surrounding landscape. By that time, many of the trees surrounding the buildings and gardens were mature, suggesting that previous owners had planted them. These include the tree allee along the entrance drive and the pecan trees south of the pavilion.

The year 1921 ushered in a new owner and additional structures. Henry Fonda constructed the brick barn and wood garage, suggesting that the property was still used for active farming and that its owner likely owned a car. James De Witt purchased the core property in 1936, although by this time the Birdwood land holdings reduced to 560 acres.

Cornelius Walworth Middleton and Isabelle Hoxie Middleton purchased Birdwood Farm in 1940 and undertook renovations to the main pavilion and also constructed Middleton House, the Caretaker's Cottage, several lakes, and a show barn for their Hereford cattle. Richard Hoxie Middleton and Martha Haugh Middleton took over ownership after the passing of CW Middleton and raised their four boys on the farm - Richard, Robert, John and William.

In 1967, the University of Virginia purchased the first of several portions of the Birdwood property. The university built a golf course at Birdwood with a separate entry drive and features related to the sport, thus maintaining the open quality of the former agricultural fields. Several of the buildings near the mansion are currently used for housing.

Birdwood was added to the National Register of Historic Places in 2003.

Extant Historic Features:

Birdwood Pavilion, c. 1819-1830 Slave Quarters, c. 1819-1830 Ice House, c. 1830 Northwest Storage Building, c. 1830 Southeast Storage Building, c 1819-1830 Southwest Storage Building, c. 1819-1830 Agricultural Landscape Approach Drive with Circle near Pavilion Pavilion Addition Trees in Front Lawn Allee of Trees along Approach Drive Pecan Trees in Rear Lawn Ornamental Gardens Water Tower, c. 1909 Stone Shed, C. 1909 Hedges near Front Portico Marble Fountain Wood Garage, c. 1920 Barn, c. 1925 Silo, c. 1930 Stone Garage, c. 1940 Middleton House, c. 1940 Caretaker Cottage, 1945 Lake
