= Boyd Tavern (Albemarle County, Virginia) =

Historic commercial building in Virginia, United States

- U.S. National Register of Historic Places
- Virginia Landmarks Register
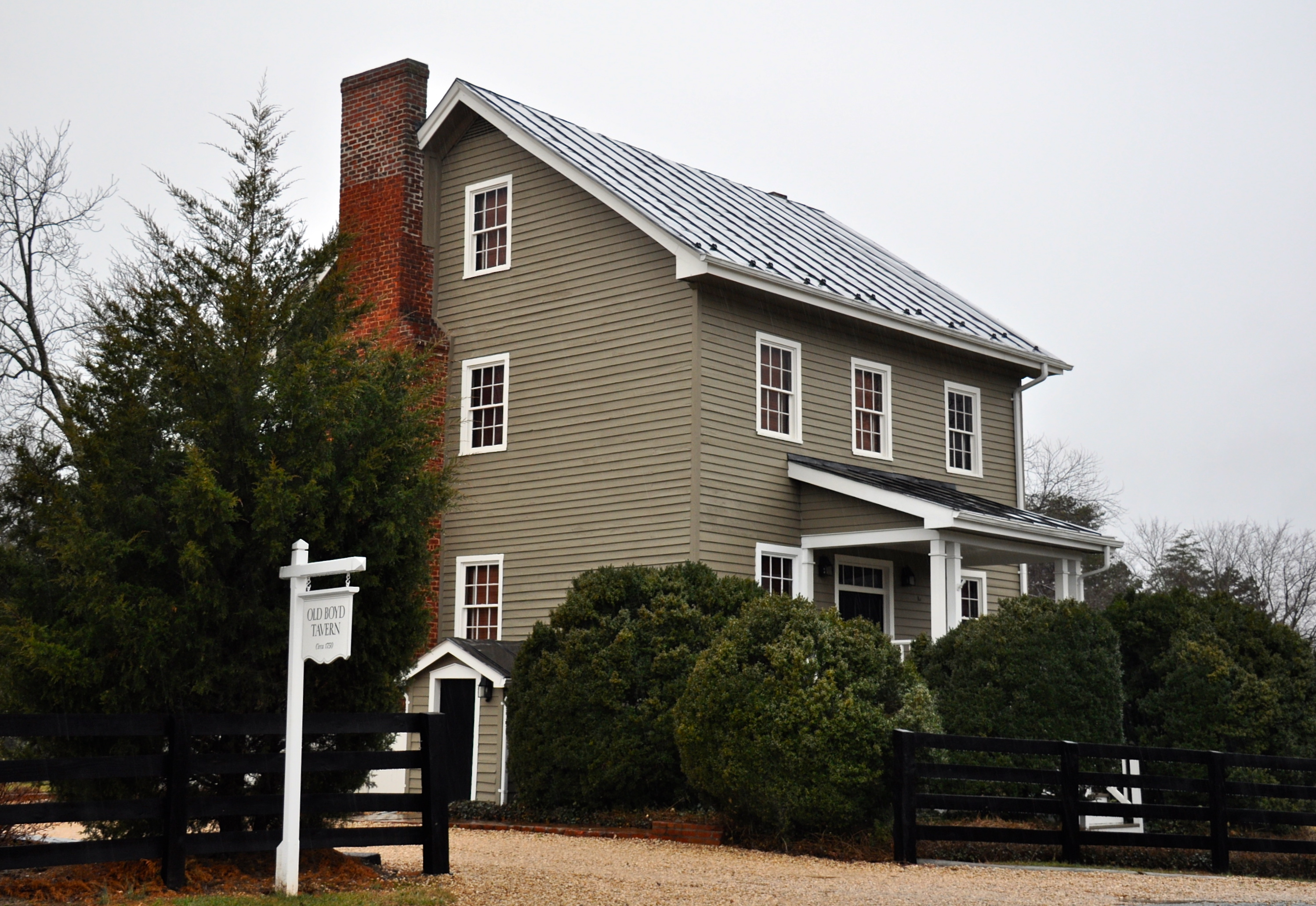
- Boyd Tavern, January 2014.

- Location within Virginia Location within the United States
- Location: VA 616, Boyd Tavern, Virginia
- Coordinates: 37°58′59.77″N 78°20′28.31″W
- Area: 3.1 acres (1.3 ha)
- Built: 1831
- Architectural style: 2 story side gabled
- NRHP reference No.: 09000919
- VLR No.: 002-0085

Significant dates
- Added to NRHP: November 12, 2009
- Designated VLR: September 17, 2009

Boyd Tavern, also known as Old Boyd Tavern, Watson's Ordinary, and Shepherd's Inn, is a historic tavern located in Boyd Tavern, Albemarle County, Virginia. It was built about 1831, and is a two-story, two-over-two, three-bay double-pile frame structure. It sits on a fieldstone foundation and has a side-gable roof. A one-story addition was built in the early 20th century. The property includes a family cemetery used by the Shepherds, owners of the property from the mid-1800s to 1937. The building housed a tavern, store, and post office at various times until 1937, when it became a single-family dwelling. The house was renovated in 1978.

It was added to the National Register of Historic Places in 2009.
