= Woodburn (Charlottesville, Virginia) =

Historic house in Virginia, United States

- U.S. National Register of Historic Places
- Virginia Landmarks Register
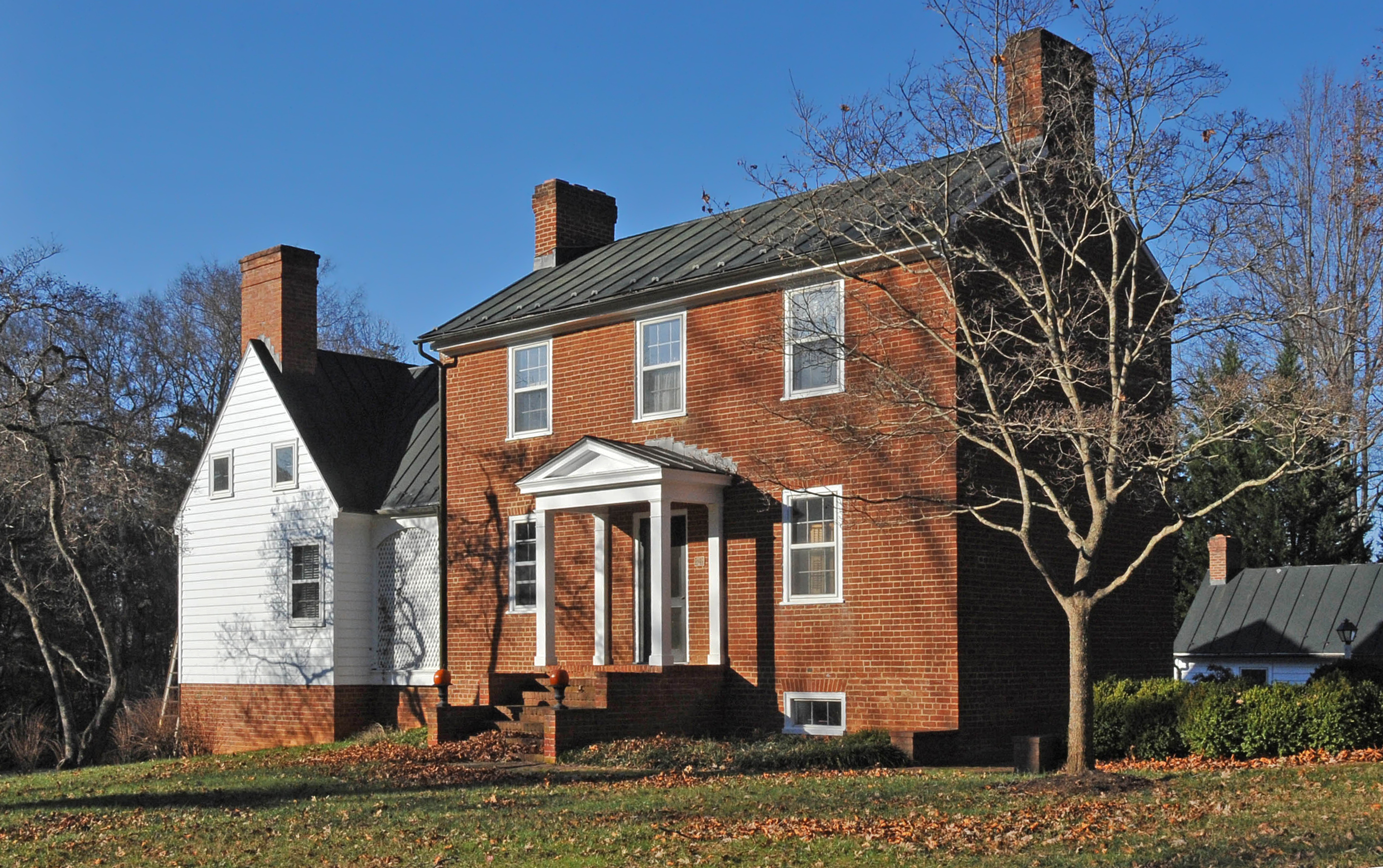

- Location within Virginia Location within the United States
- Location: Rt. 649, 2 miles east of Rt. 29, near Charlottesville, Virginia
- Coordinates: 38°07′0″N 78°25′31″W
- Area: 18.5 acres (7.5 ha)
- Built: 1821
- Architectural style: Federal
- NRHP reference No.: 00000029
- VLR No.: 002-2208

Significant dates
- Added to NRHP: January 28, 2000
- Designated VLR: December 1, 1999

Woodburn, also known as Mundy House, is a historic home and farm complex located near Charlottesville, Albemarle County, Virginia. The original section of the house, built about 1821, consists of a two-story, brick hall and parlor plan Federal style dwelling. It has one-story frame additions to the rear and a skillfully attached 1 1/2-story frame wing built in 1983. Also on the property is the Mundy family cemetery.

It was added to the National Register of Historic Places in 2000.
