= Virginia State Route 53 =

State highway in central Virginia, US

State Route 53
- Thomas Jefferson Parkway

Route information
- Maintained by VDOT
- Length: 18.32 mi (29.48 km)
- Existed: 1947–present
- Tourist routes: Journey Through Hallowed Ground Byway; Virginia Byway

Major junctions
- West end: SR 20 near Charlottesville
- East end: US 15 in Palmyra

Location
- Country: United States
- State: Virginia
- Counties: Albemarle, Fluvanna

Highway system
- Virginia Routes; Interstate; US; Primary; Secondary; Byways; History; HOT lanes
← US 52	→ SR 54

State Route 53 (SR 53) is a primary state highway in the U.S. state of Virginia. Known as Thomas Jefferson Parkway, the state highway runs 18.32 miles (29.48 km) from SR 20 near Charlottesville east to U.S. Route 15 (US 15) in Palmyra. SR 53 connects the county seats of Albemarle and Fluvanna counties. The state highway also provides access to the community of Lake Monticello and Monticello, the estate of Thomas Jefferson. The route of SR 53 became a state highway in 1930; the highway receives its present designation in 1947.

== Route description ==
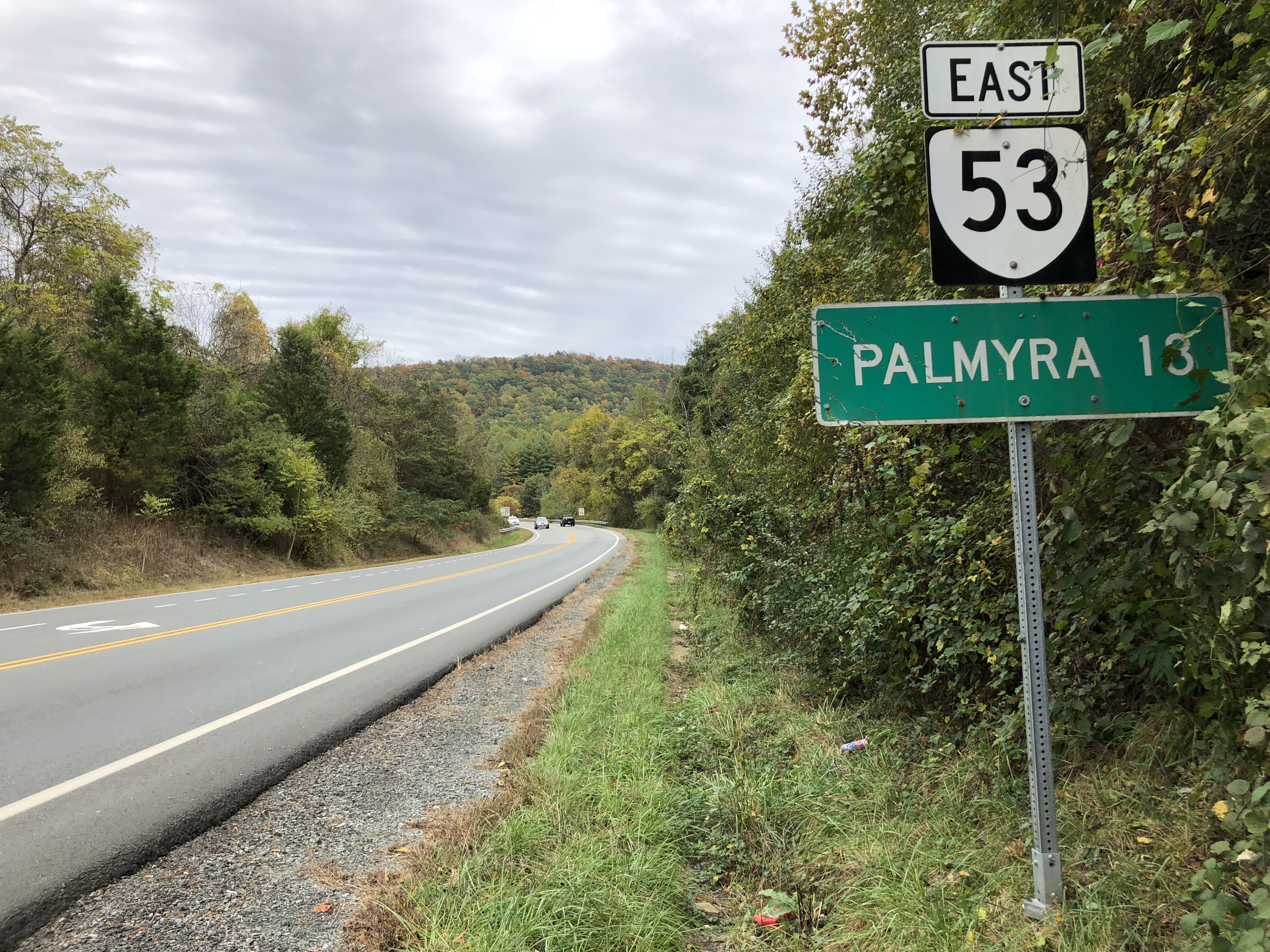
View east from the west end of SR 53 at SR 20 near Charlottesville

SR 53 begins at an intersection with SR 20 (Scottsville Road) a short distance south of SR 20's interchange with Interstate 64 in Albemarle County just south of the independent city of Charlottesville. The state highway heads east and begins to ascend Carters Mountain, which is part of the Southwest Mountains. Just west of Michie Tavern, SR 53 winds as it continues to its summit between Monticello to the east and Montalto, also known as the Mountaintop Farm and Patterson Mountain, to the west. A two-way ramp connects SR 53 with the Monticello access road, which passes over the state highway.

SR 53 has a few more curves as it descends the mountain to the hamlet of Simeon, where the highway intersects SR 795 (James Monroe Parkway). SR 795 leads south to the estate of James Monroe, Ashlawn-Highland. SR 53 crosses Buck Island Creek near its confluence with the Rivanna River before entering Fluvanna County. The state highway passes along the western edge of the suburban resort community of Lake Monticello, which is centered around the lake of the same name. The state highway reaches its eastern terminus at US 15 (James Madison Highway) just south of the U.S. Highway's crossing of the Rivanna River in Palmyra, the county seat.

== History ==
A small piece of SR 53, from the west end at SR 20 towards Monticello, was added to the state highway system in 1930 (along with SR 20 north to Charlottesville) as State Route 714; it became State Route 239 in the 1933 renumbering. In 1941, State Route 20 was extended north from Scottsville to Charlottesville via Blenheim and Overton, absorbing SR 239. SR 20 was shifted west to its current alignment in 1947; at the same time, current SR 53 was upgraded from State Route 642, and a short piece of old SR 20 became SR 53.

== Major intersections ==
County	Location	mi	km	Destinations	Notes
Albemarle		0.00	0.00	SR 20 (Scottsville Road) to I-64 – Scottsville, Dillwyn, Charlottesville	Western terminus
Albemarle		1.75	2.82	Monticello Loop – Monticello	interchange
Albemarle	Simeon			SR 795 (James Monroe Parkway) – Highland	former SR 20 south; marked as Ashlawn on signage, officially named Highland
Fluvanna	Lake Monticello			SR 618 east (Lake Monticello Road) – Lake Monticello	Lake Monticello public access; roundabout constructed in 2020
Fluvanna	Lake Monticello			SR 1015 (Turkeysag Trail)	Lake Monticello main gate; roundabout proposed
Fluvanna	Lake Monticello			SR 600 north (Boston Road) – Lake Monticello	Roundabout constructed in 2013
Fluvanna	Palmyra	18.32	29.48	US 15 (James Madison Highway) to I-64 – Gordonsville, Farmville	Eastern terminus; roundabout constructed in 2017
1.000 mi = 1.609 km; 1.000 km = 0.621 mi

< SR 713	District 7 State Routes; 1928–1933	SR 715 >
