= Sunnyfields (Simeon, Virginia) =

Historic house in Virginia, United States

- U.S. National Register of Historic Places
- Virginia Landmarks Register
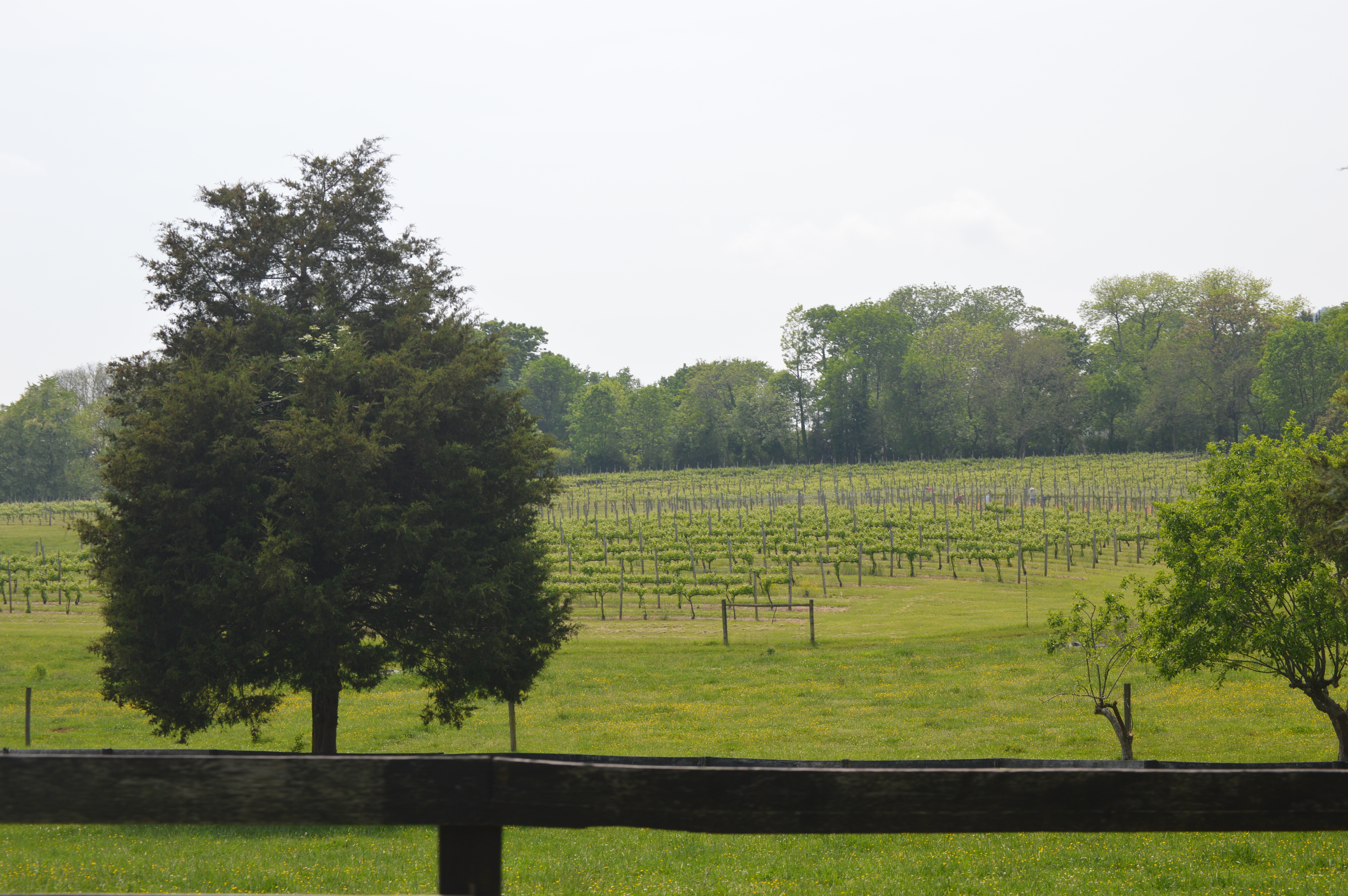
- Vineyards on the estate

- Location within Virginia Location within the United States
- Location: VA 53 west side, at the junction with VA 732, near Simeon, Virginia
- Coordinates: 37°59′33″N 78°27′11″W
- Area: 9.5 acres (3.8 ha)
- Built: 1833
- Built by: William B. Phillips
- Architectural style: Classical Revival, Early Republic
- NRHP reference No.: 93000509
- VLR No.: 002-0480

Significant dates
- Added to NRHP: June 10, 1993
- Designated VLR: April 21, 1993

Sunnyfields is a historic home located between Monticello and Ash Lawn-Highland near Simeon, Albemarle County, Virginia. It was built in 1833, and is a two-story, nearly square brick structure painted white. It has a two-story corner tower, dating to either from just before or just after the American Civil War, and two-story, frame wing. Also on the property is a contributing servants' cottage. It was designed and built by William B. Phillips, who was employed by Thomas Jefferson as principal builder at the University of Virginia.

It was added to the National Register of Historic Places in 1993.
