= Scott Stadium =

American college football stadium

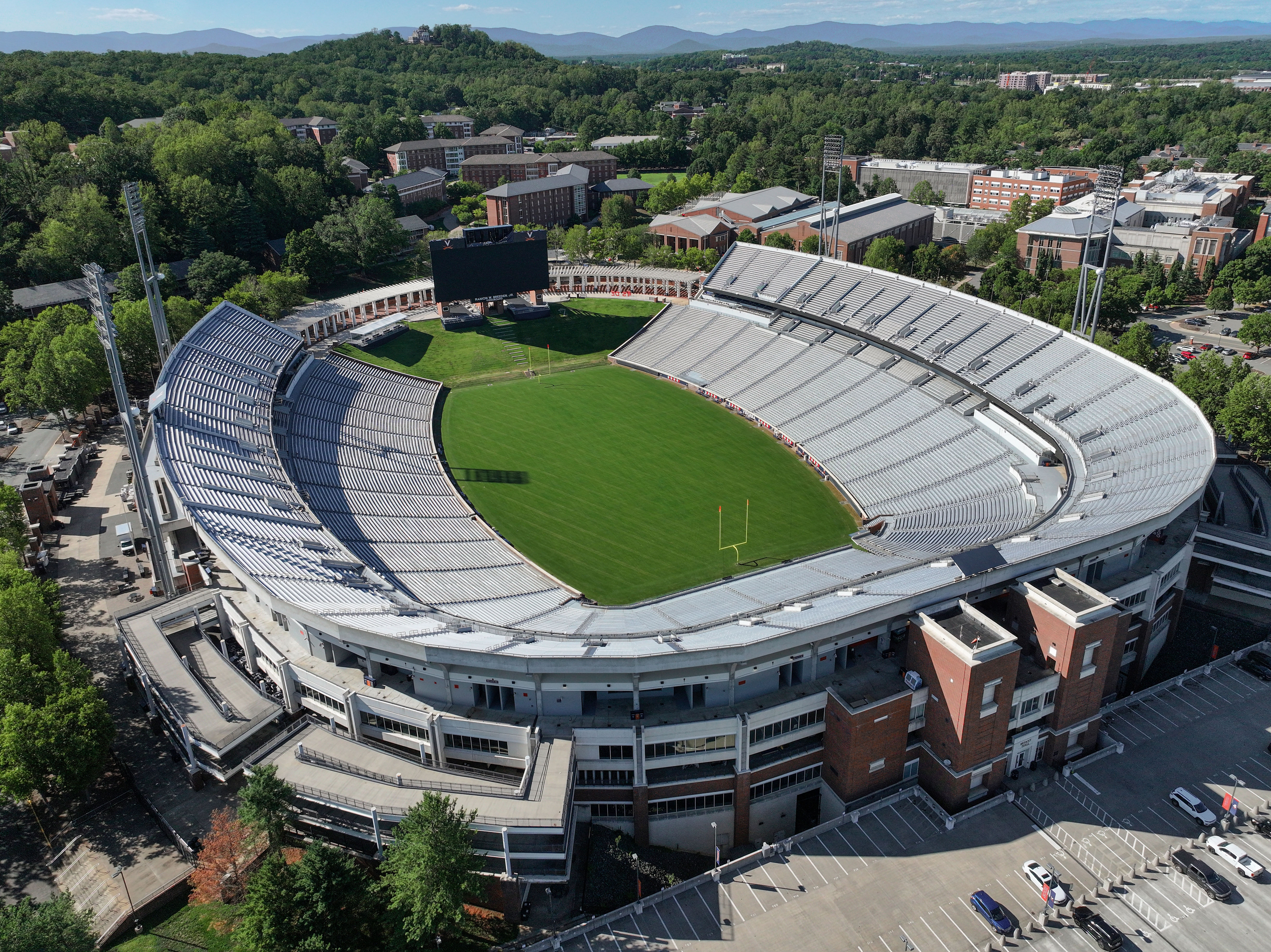
- Aerial view of the stadium in 2026

- Location in Virginia Location in the United States
- Address: 1815 Stadium Road; Albemarle County, VA; United States
- Coordinates: 38°1′52″N 78°30′49″W
- Operator: University of Virginia
- Capacity: 61,500 (2000–present) Former capacity: List: 44,000 (1999); 42,000 (1982–1998); 42,073 (1980–1981); 37,273 (1978–1979); 28,000 (1973–1977); 23,848 (1964–1972); 26,500 (1964–1965); 24,500 (1948–1963); 22,000 (1931–1947)
- Type: Stadium
- Surface: Grass (1931–1973, 1995–Present); Astroturf (1974–1994)
- Record attendance: 64,947 (August 30, 2008)
- Current use: Football

Construction
- Groundbreaking: 1930; 96 years ago
- Opened: October 15, 1931; 94 years ago
- Expanded: 1974, 1980, 1999–2000
- Cost: $300,000 ($6.35 million in 2025 dollars) $25 Million (2000 expansion)
- Architects: Edmund S. Campbell; Heery International, Inc. (expansion)
- General contractors: Conquest, Moncure & Dunn Inc.

Tenants
- Virginia Cavaliers (NCAA) (1931–present)

Website
- virginiasports.com/scott-stadium

Scott Stadium, in full The Carl Smith Center, home of David A. Harrison III Field at Scott Stadium, is a stadium located in Charlottesville, Virginia. It is the home of the Virginia Cavaliers football team. It sits on the University of Virginia's Grounds, east of Hereford College and first-year dorms on Alderman Road but west of Brown College and the Lawn. Constructed in 1931, it is the oldest active FBS football stadium in Virginia.

It also hosts other events, such as concerts like the Dave Matthews Band in 2001, the Rolling Stones in 2005, and U2 in 2009. The Virginia High School League held its Group AAA Division 5 and 6 football state championship games at the stadium until 2015. The facility has also hosted the Division I NCAA Men's Lacrosse Championship in 1977 and 1982 and the ACC Women's Lacrosse Tournament in 2008.

== History ==
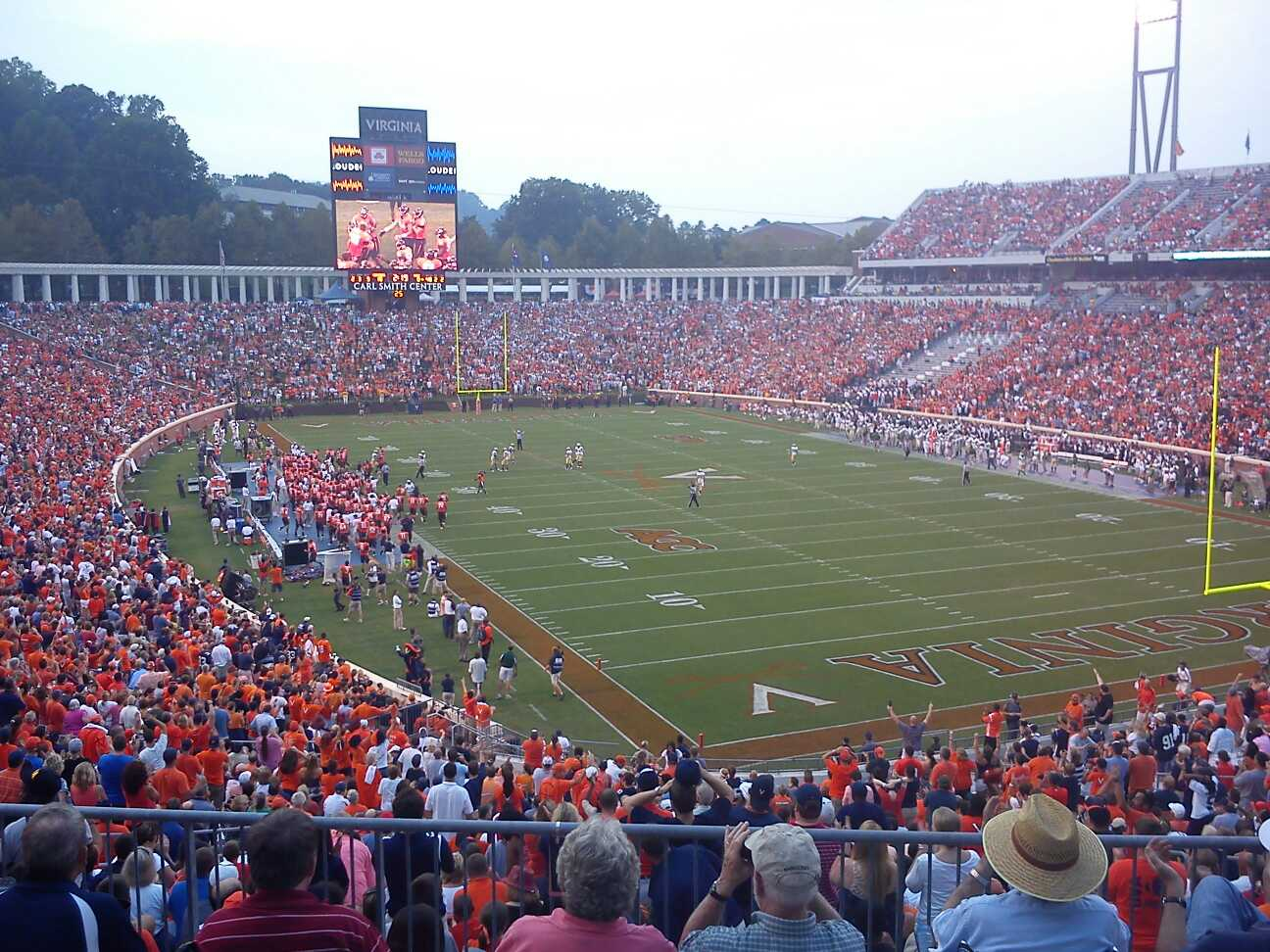
The stadium during a game in 2011

Built at the then-cost of US$300,000 as a replacement for the old Lambeth Field or "Colonnades," Scott Stadium bears the name of donor and University rector Frederic William Scott (1862–1939), and held 25,000 spectators at opening. The stadium had a view of the Blue Ridge Mountains and specifically Monticello Mountain out the south end of the stadium. An artificial turf system was installed in 1974, making the long tradition of a mounted Cavalier riding into the stadium with the football team impossible. David A. Harrison III provided a gift allowing natural grass to be reinstalled in the stadium, and the Cavalier has ridden into Scott Stadium every game since 1995 accompanied by orange and blue fireworks.

Since 1972, Scott has hosted 24 Virginia High School League football championship games, including the 5A and 6A finals every year from 2009–15.

== Top attendance records ==
Date	Attendance	Opponent	Result
August 30, 2008	64,947	Southern California	UVA lost, 52–7
November 13, 2004	63,701	Miami	UVA lost, 31–21
November 19, 2005	63,344	Virginia Tech	UVA lost, 52–14
October 15, 2005	63,106	Florida State	UVA won, 26–21
November 6, 2004	63,072	Maryland	UVA won, 16–0
October 18, 2003	62,875	Florida State	UVA lost, 19–14
September 11, 2004	62,790	North Carolina	UVA won, 56–24
August 29, 2026	62,779	NC State	UVA won, 34–8
October 7, 2004	61,833	Clemson	UVA won, 30–10
August 30, 2003	61,737	Duke	UVA won, 27–0
November 24, 2007	61,711	Virginia Tech	UVA lost, 33–21

== Stadium expansion projects ==
=== 1981 ===
The first expansion to the stadium's capacity came in 1981, when upper decks and grass hill seating allowed 40,000 fans.

=== 2000 ===
Carl Smith's donations helped make the most recent contributions to Scott Stadium in 2000, filling in the upper deck and south end to allow 20,000 additional fans, and installing the pergola, state-of-the-art lighting and large audio/visual tower known as "Hoo-Vision," as well as a new lighting system placed on towers with "V's" built in. The facility's official name is a result of this string of donations.

=== 2009 ===
Scott Stadium received a new scoreboard and a larger video screen, Hoo Vision.

=== 2024 ===
The Ramon W. Breeden Jr. Videoboard was installed at Scott Stadium during the summer of 2024 and debuted during that football season. The 6,700-square-foot display is more than double the size of the previous 2009-era board and features a custom audio system and enhanced Hoo Vision to improve the game-day experience for fans.

== Traditions ==
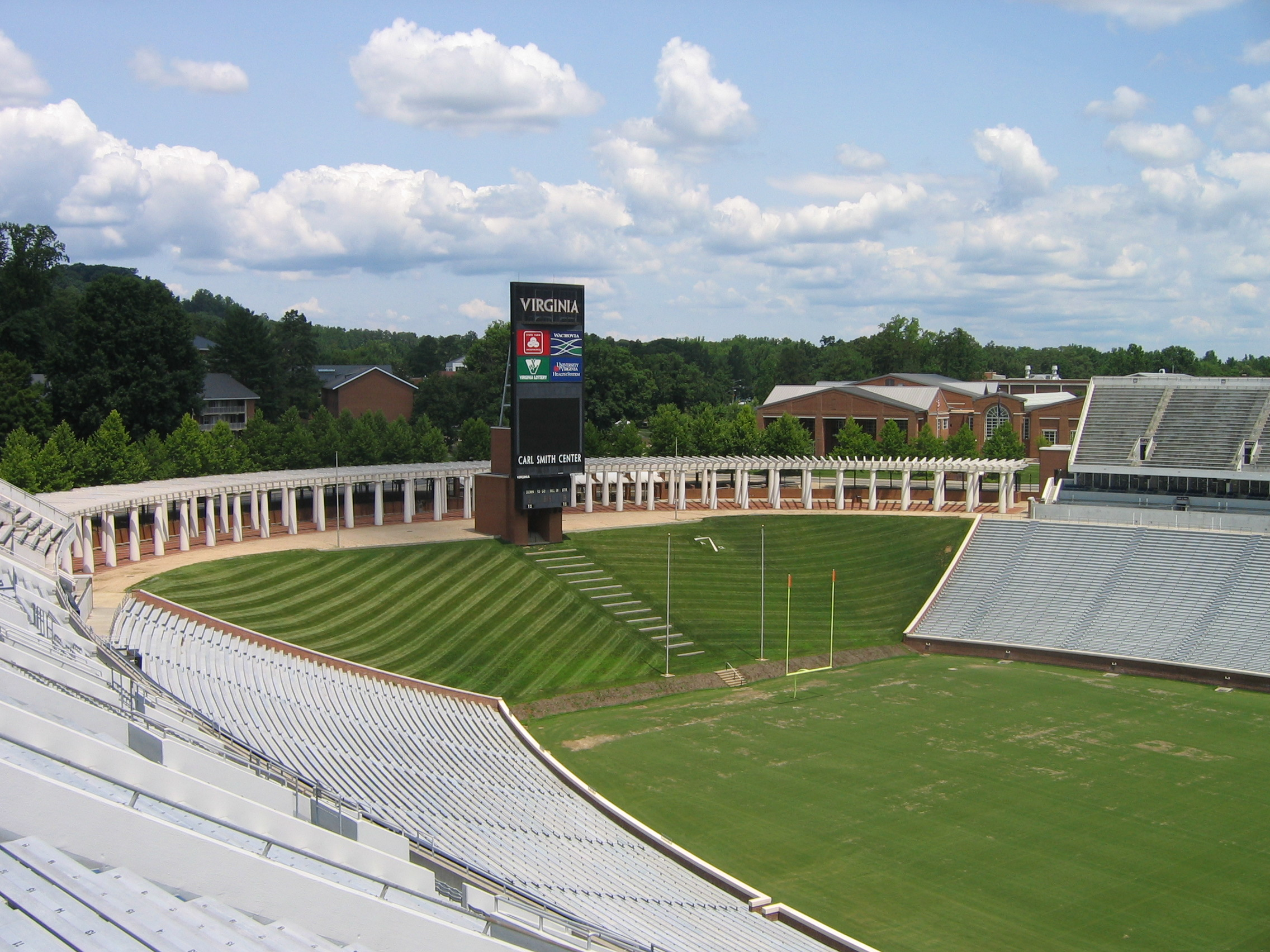
Scott Stadium and its scoreboard in 2007

Traditionally, men wore coats and ties and women wore sundresses to games, which is also tradition at Clemson, Alabama, Auburn, Georgia, and Ole Miss. Beginning during the 2003 season, however, head coach Al Groh called upon fans to set aside traditional attire for orange clothing.

The T-shirt movement has been welcomed by many, but ties and sundresses can still be easily spotted at Scott Stadium among students and alumni. Some have compromised by wearing ties with orange dress shirts or orange sundresses. The Cavalier Daily, the university's daily student-published newspaper, weighed in on the debate in its September 1, 2005, lead editorial. The Declaration, an alternative weekly news magazine at the university, also ran a feature story on the debate prior to the 2006 home opener.

== Notable games ==
=== September 8, 1990: #14 Virginia 20, #9 Clemson 7 ===
UVA entered this game with an 0–29 record against Clemson. The win was Virginia's first-ever victory over an opponent ranked in the top ten. Both goalposts came down when the fans stormed the field; the first actually fell with 48 seconds still on the clock. The win proved to be something of a watershed in UVA football history in that it set the stage for the 1990 squad to begin the season 7–0, rising to #1 in the polls for the first time. In addition, in contrast to Virginia's historical futility against Clemson prior to the 1990 game, as of 2013 UVA has beaten Clemson eight times (and tied once) since that 1990 win, although since 2004 the schools no longer play every year due to the Atlantic Coast Conference's expansion.

=== November 3, 1990: #16 Georgia Tech 41, #1 Virginia 38 ===
The Yellow Jackets ended Virginia's three-week reign at #1 in the polls as they overcame a two-touchdown halftime deficit to win on Scott Sisson's 37-yard field goal with 0:07 left. Undefeated Georgia Tech would go on to win the rest of its games to take a share of the National Championship.

=== November 2, 1995: #24 Virginia 33, #2 Florida State 28 ===
This nationally-televised contest was the first Thursday night game played at Scott Stadium and marked Florida State's first loss in an ACC game (after winning its first 29). In arguably the greatest victory in Virginia football history, FSU running back Warrick Dunn was stopped inches from the south end zone goal line after taking a direct snap on the game's final play. Fans stormed the field and brought down both goalposts, a feat not since repeated at Scott Stadium.

=== November 16, 1996: Virginia 20, #6 North Carolina 17 ===
With Mack Brown's squad poised to clinch a spot in the Bowl Alliance, UVA trailed North Carolina 17–3 in the fourth quarter and the Tar Heels were driving for the knockout blow when Antwan Harris picked off a third-down pass and returned it 95 yards for a touchdown. Following quarterback Tim Sherman's touchdown scramble on the Hoos' next drive, kicker Rafael Garcia hit the game-winning 32-yard field goal with 0:39 left. In this installment of the South's Oldest Rivalry, Virginia extended North Carolina's winless drought in Scott Stadium to 15 years with the 20–17 upset.

=== October 15, 2005: Virginia 26, #4 Florida State 21 ===
Ten seasons after the 33–28 milestone, Virginia's 1995 ACC Co-Championship squad was honored in a halftime ceremony. UVA went on to win in a 26–21 upset for its first victory over FSU since the 1995 game. Quarterback Marques Hagans threw for 306 yards and two touchdowns, and Connor Hughes kicked four field goals in the victory.

Following the game a large part of the crowd stormed the field, with some fans climbing the goalposts. The celebration was marred, however, by the fact that 12 people were injured in the stampede accompanying the rush to the field.

=== November 29, 2019: Virginia 39, #24 Virginia Tech 30 ===
The Cavaliers entered the Commonwealth Cup looking to snap a 15-year losing streak versus the Hokies, led by star quarterback Bryce Perkins. In front of a crowd of 52,619, UVA went on to win in a 39–30 upset for its first victory against the Hokies since 2003. Kicker Brian Delaney made both of his attempted field goals, notching a 48-yard field goal in the fourth quarter. Perkins passed for 311 yards and rushed for 164 in the historic victory. By defeating Virginia Tech, the Cavaliers won the ACC Coastal Division and secured a spot in the ACC Championship against the Clemson Tigers.

=== September 26, 2025: Virginia 46, #8 Florida State 38 ===
The Seminoles came to Charlottesville riding high from a 31–17 upset over Alabama in Week 1 and were ranked eighth in the nation after three games. In front of 50,107 fans, the Hoos battled Florida State to a second overtime, where a rushing touchdown by star quarterback Chandler Morris and a game-sealing interception by defensive back Ja'son Prevard on fourth & 12 sealed the game for the Cavaliers, resulting in one of the quickest field stormings in recent memory. The win improved Virginia's record to 4–1, as well as 2–0 in ACC play.

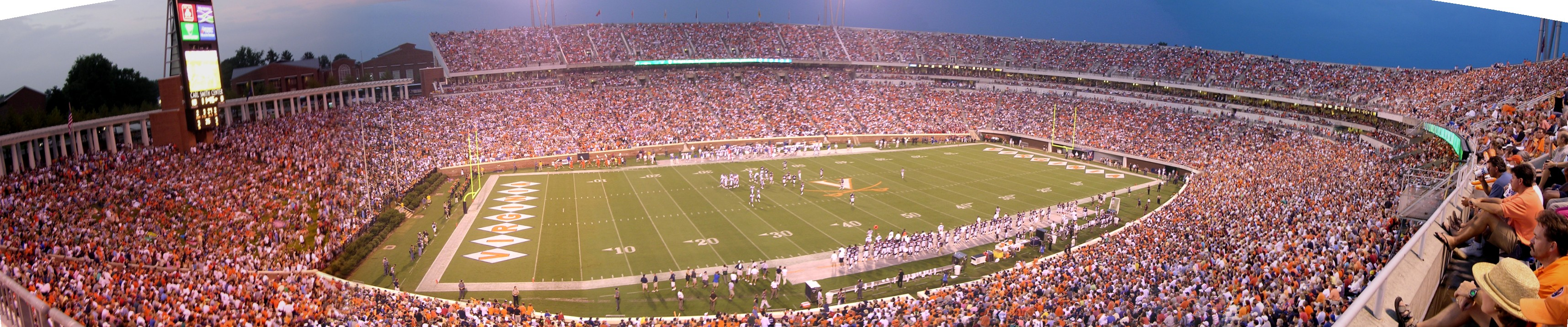
A panoramic view of 2003's season-opening Duke–Virginia game, attended by a then-stadium record 61,737 fans

== See also ==
- List of NCAA Division I FBS football stadiums
