= Brown College at Monroe Hill =

Historic house in Virginia, United States

Brown College At Monroe Hill
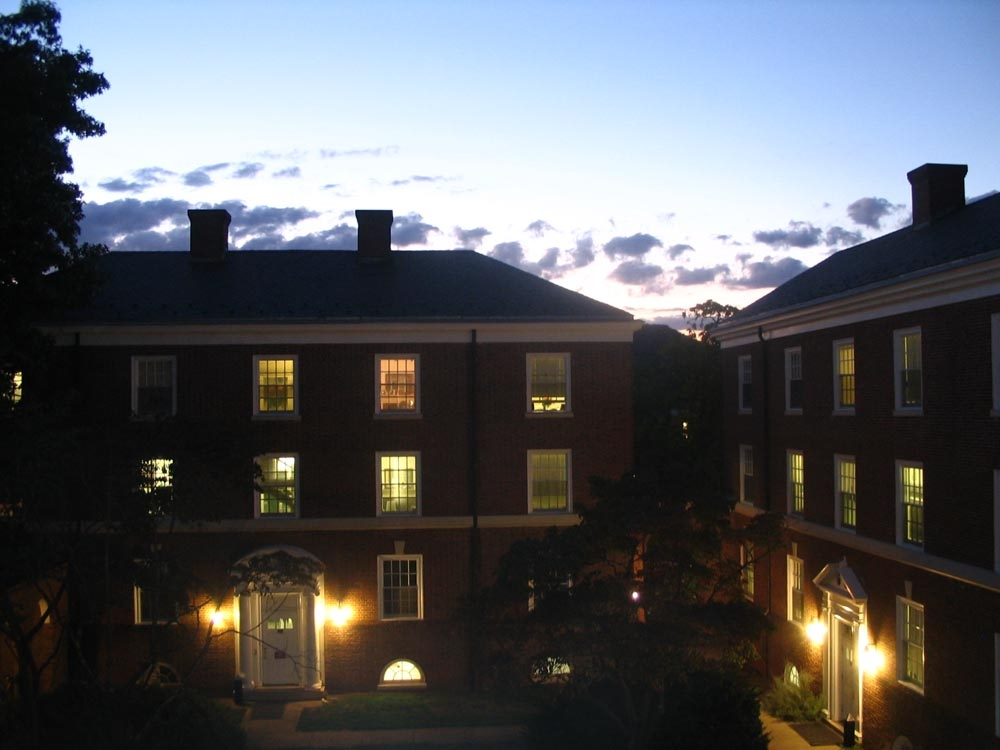
- Type: Residential college
- Established: 1986
- Affiliations: University of Virginia
- Principal: Angel Adams Parham
- Faculty: 50
- Undergraduates: approx. 300
- Postgraduates: 2
- Location: Charlottesville, Va., US; 38°2′5.4″N 78°30′27.8″W
- Campus: 12 Portals located at former President James Monroe's Hill House
- Website: virginia.edu/browncollege

Brown College at Monroe Hill is one of three residential colleges at the University of Virginia. Originally named Monroe Hill College, Brown opened in 1986 as the first modern residential college at the University of Virginia. It was renamed Brown College at Monroe Hill in recognition of the endowment donated by the Brown family (of the Brown-Forman Corporation) in 1994. The college is led by Angel Parham, Principal. A number of faculty fellows from many departments and schools of the university maintain close ties to the college.

The compound that conforms the college is principally made of the following buildings known as portals: Davis, Smith, Mallet, Long, Venable, Gildersleeve, McGuffey, Harrison, Tucker, Holmes, Rogers and Peters. Each portal houses approximately 24 students and all twelve are connected by underground passages frequently referred to as tunnels.

- Monroe Hill
- U.S. National Register of Historic Places
- Virginia Landmarks Register
- Location within Virginia Location within the United States
- Location: 252 and 256 McCormick Rd., Charlottesville, Virginia
- Area: 2.2 acres (0.89 ha)
- Built: 1790
- Built by: Perry, John
- Architectural style: Early Republic, Classical Revival
- NRHP reference No.: 04000575
- VLR No.: 104-0124

Significant dates
- Added to NRHP: June 2, 2004
- Designated VLR: March 17, 2004

== History ==
The historic Monroe Hill complex includes the Monroe Hill House, the James Monroe law office, and two arcaded ranges constructed as student rooms. The Monroe Hill House was James Monroe's residence and family farm, and the Grounds of the University of Virginia are built upon land purchased from the former president. The Monroe Hill House is the original house in which Monroe resided. The original section of the house was built about 1790, as a one-story, 26 by 20 feet, brick dwelling. It was enlarged in 1814, by John Perry to a two-story, five-bay, brick dwelling with a Greek Revival facade. It has stucco covered front and rear facades, a low hipped roof, and a one-story portico with paired Tuscan order columns. The James Monroe Law Office was built about 1790, and is a 1 1/2-story, two-bay, brick building with a fieldstone foundation. It consists of two small rooms on the first floor with a steep stair in a narrow hall leading to the second floor. The two arcaded ranges, built in 1848 and known as the Brown Range and Dawson Range, consist of six student rooms each. The Brown Range connects the main house to the James Monroe Law Office. In 1848, the site became a residential college for students given grants by the Commonwealth of Virginia to attend the University of Virginia. Monroe Hill continues to be used for educational purposes as a residential college, now known as Brown College.

Monroe Hill was listed on the National Register of Historic Places in 2004.

When built in 1929, the portals were the first new dormitories since the founding of the university, and originally housed first year students.

In 2022, residents of Brown College began a campaign to rename the portals, all of which are named after slave owners or Confederate veterans. While the portals are still formally known by their original names, current Brown residents refer to the portals as Periwinkle, Redwood, Honey, Teal, Hazel, Magenta, Green, Violet, Dandelion, Lapis, Maroon, and Saffron.

=== Timeline ===
- 1929: The portals were built as a response to growing numbers of students at the university.
- 1935: Portals designated first year only residences
- 1952: McCormick Road Residences built for first years
- 1970s: Dorms transition from male graduate housing to coed, graduate and upperclass undergraduate housing
- 1986: Monroe Hill College residential college established
- 1994: Renamed Brown College at Monroe Hill and made a permanent residential college
- 1997: First years (30) are allowed to live in Brown College
- 2006: Number of first years increases from 30 to 46
- 2025: Changed to prioritizing upperclassmen students over Freshman for reapplications.

== Membership ==
Brown College's population is made of undergraduate students. The acceptance process into Brown College is competitive requiring completion of a formal application which includes several out-of-the-ordinary essay questions, such as "You have taken yourself hostage. Write a list of your demands." and "You are a 7-year-old child with the diction and lexicon of a 35-year-old college professor, but an emotional depth befitting your age. Have a temper tantrum." Applicants are also given a blank page and instructed to use it as they see fit.

Applications are written, read, and scored by only current Brown College residents. Once a student has been accepted and chooses to live in Brown College, that student has priority in reapplication until graduation from the university.

== Governance ==
The student leadership of Brown is provided by both the Brown College Governance Board (Govboard) and the Resident Staff (Res Staff), all of whom may use money budgeted for student activities. Intra-portal events are run by Portal Representatives, and have ranged from cultural dinners and movies to more edgy events such as "Eat and Get Out," "Picto-telephone," and "Guess the Behind."

Events meant for the general Brown Community are run by co-chairs:

- Sports and Extracurriculars (S&EX): Responsible for promoting UVA, intramural, national, and community sports
- Alumni: Responsible for maintaining a relationship with alumni of Brown College.
- Sustainability: Responsible for promoting conservation, outdoors, and sustainability in Brown.
- Community Outreach: Responsible for keeping Brown in touch with other organizations at UVA.
- Fellow Liaisons: Responsible for planning events where students and faculty members can meet in a more casual setting than the classroom.
- Hauntings: In charge of organizing the annual Hauntings at Monroe Hill, a haunted house to raise money for charity during Halloween.
- Membership: Responsible for creating the college's application as well as overseeing the reading and scoring of submitted applications
- New Resident Liaisons: Formally known as First Year Liaisons. Responsible for acclimating new residents into Brown as well as the university
- Panjandrum: Responsible for miscellaneous and/or large scale purchases for the college, from Lego to picnic tables, or dish soap to Xbox 360s
- Public Relations: Responsible for getting Brown's name and its public events out to the university, and responsible for recording events around Brown for the benefit of current and future Brown residents.
- Social: Responsible for the two semi-formal dances, a spring carnival, and a host of other events for all of Brown
- Techmasters: Responsible for running Brown College website and keeping it up to date.
- Saffron: Responsible for the planning, execution, and management of "Saffron Cafe," a recurring event focused on studying in a group with refreshments and baked goods served by the Co-Chairs

The Officers of Govboard consist of the President (formerly known as the Grand Poobah), the Vice President (formerly known as the Shama Llama Ding Dong), and the annually renamed Treasurer, as well as the office of Secretary, which will also be annually renamed. The names were chosen on the theory that their powers would be more difficult to abuse given such humorous and unlikely titles. The President is responsible for managing external relations, and the Vice President runs the weekly Govboard meetings and all internal affairs. A vote to change the names was conducted in Fall 2023.

== Activities ==
Each semester, Brown College offers the university community courses and short courses on topics such as "Arthurian Legend," "The Influence of Schopenhauerian Metaphysics in Wagner," and "History and Science of the Modern Firearm." Most of these short courses are taught by students living in Brown.

In the fall, Brown College puts on Hauntings- a series of haunted tents and rooms constructed within three days and taken down one day after the run completes. Hauntings, which began in 1990, raises money for charity and provides a tradition for both the students at the University of Virginia and the local families of Charlottesville, Virginia.

== Documentaries and other media ==
Monroe Hill (Cradle of the University of Virginia) Documentary-essay tracing the roots and historical context of James Monroe's first home in Albemarle County. The property known as Monroe Hill, which serves as the administrative offices of Brown Residential College, is located in grounds of the University of Virginia.
