= Lake Monticello, Virginia =

- Census-designated place
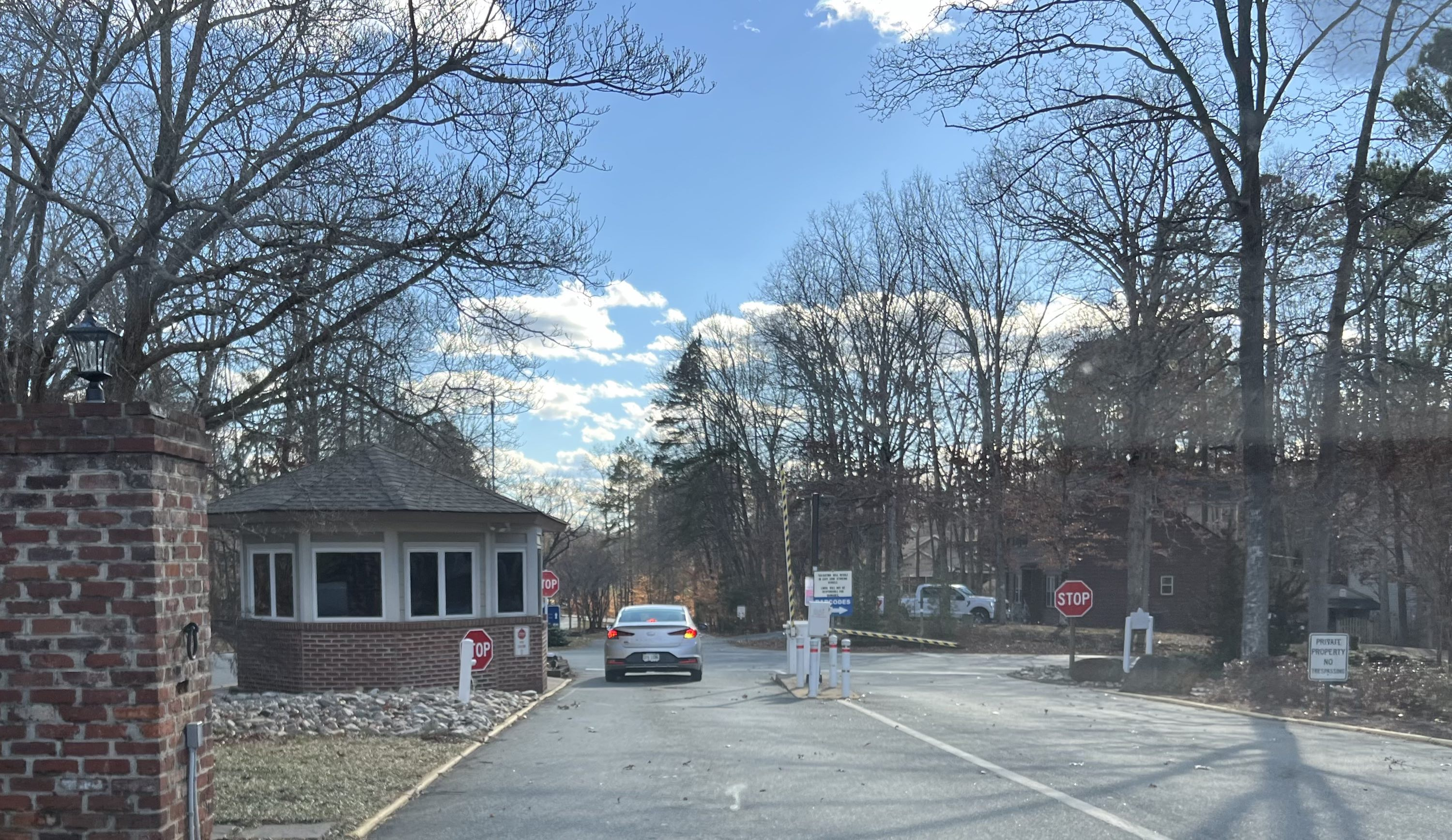
- Main entrance to Lake Monticello (Ashlawn Boulevard)

- Karte Location of the Lake Monticello CDP within Fluvanna County

- Location within Virginia Location within the United States
- Coordinates: 37°55′6″N 78°19′36″W
- Country: United States
- State: Virginia
- County: Fluvanna

Area
  - Total: 9.5 sq mi (24.5 km^{2})
  - Land: 8.8 sq mi (22.9 km^{2})
  - Water: 0.62 sq mi (1.6 km^{2})
- Elevation: 377 ft (115 m)

Population (2020)
  - Total: 10,126
  - Density: 1,150/sq mi (442/km^{2})
- Time zone: UTC-5 (Eastern (EST))
  - Summer (DST): UTC-4 (EDT)
- ZIP code: 22963
- Area code: 434
- FIPS code: 51-43424
- GNIS feature ID: 1867591

Lake Monticello
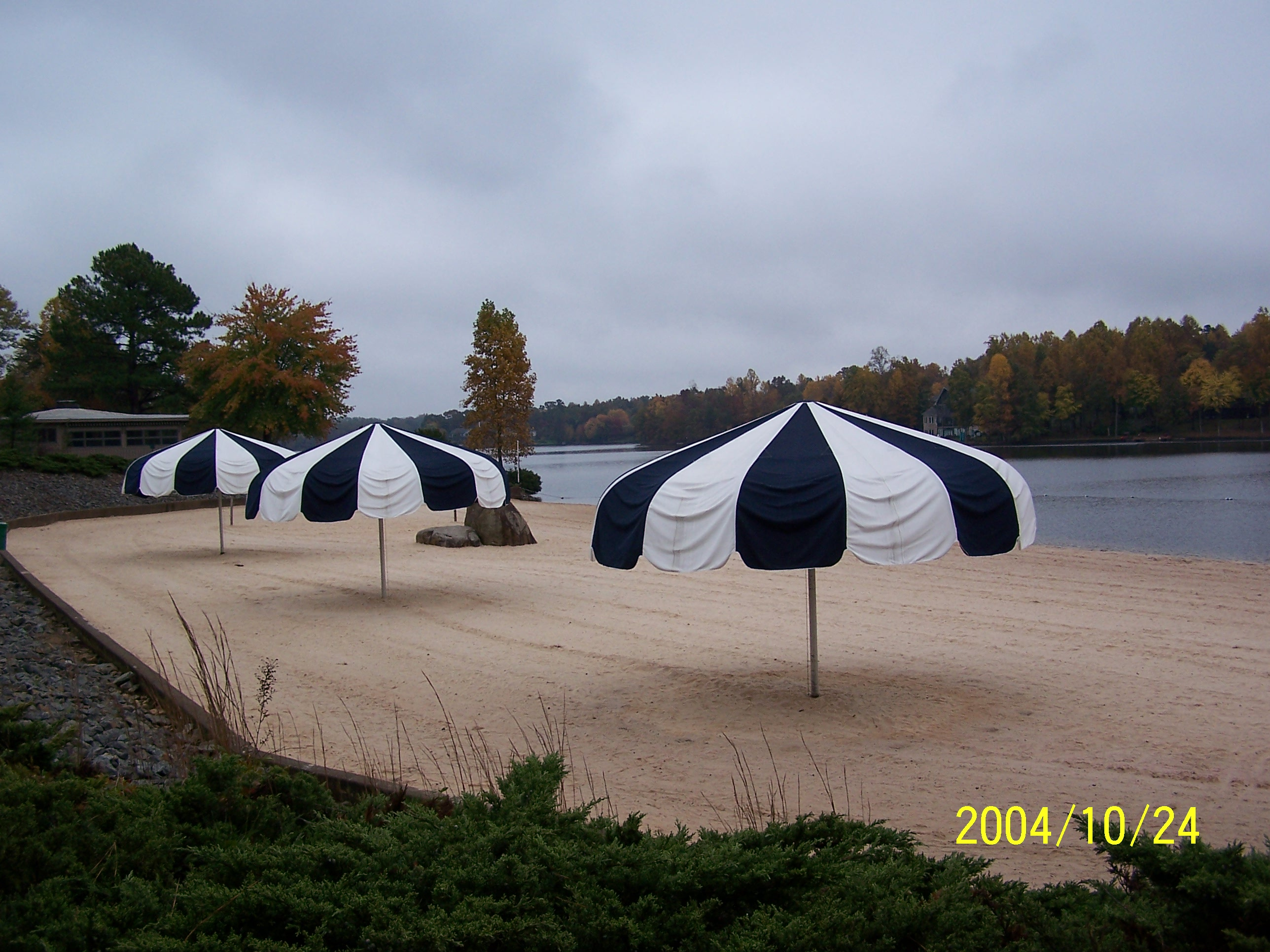

- Location within Virginia
- Location: Fluvanna County, Virginia
- Coordinates: 37°54′50″N 78°18′00″W
- Type: mesotrophic to eutrophic
- Catchment area: 5,480 acres (22.2 km^{2})
- Basin countries: United States
- Surface area: 317 acres (128 ha)
- Surface elevation: 315 ft (96 m)

Lake Monticello, a private gated community, is a census-designated place (CDP) in Fluvanna County, Virginia, United States. The population was 10,126 at the 2020 census. The community is centered on a man-made lake of the same name, which is formed by a dam on a short tributary of the nearby Rivanna River. Lake Monticello is part of the Charlottesville metropolitan area. Lake Monticello was developed in the 1960s as a summer vacation home community but quickly evolved into a bedroom community of Charlottesville, and to a lesser extent of Richmond. It has a sizable retirement age population.

== Geography ==
Lake Monticello is located in northwestern Fluvanna County at 37°55′6″N 78°19′36″W (37.918286, -78.326803). It is bordered to the northwest by the Albemarle County line, to the northeast by the Rivanna River, to the south by Riverside Drive and South Boston Road, and to the southwest by Virginia State Route 53, the Thomas Jefferson Parkway. VA 53 leads northwest 14 miles (23 km) to Charlottesville, passing Monticello, the estate of Thomas Jefferson, along the way. According to the United States Census Bureau, the CDP has a total area of 9.5 square miles (24.5 km^{2}), of which 8.8 square miles (22.9 km^{2}) is land and 0.62 square miles (1.6 km^{2}), or 6.59%, is water. Via the Rivanna River, Lake Monticello is part of the James River watershed.

== Demographics ==
Historical population
Census	Pop.	Note	%±
2000	6,852		—
2010	9,920		44.8%
2020	10,126		2.1%

=== 2020 census ===
As of the 2020 census, Lake Monticello had a population of 10,126. The median age was 46.6 years. 19.7% of residents were under the age of 18 and 25.0% of residents were 65 years of age or older. For every 100 females there were 89.9 males, and for every 100 females age 18 and over there were 87.1 males age 18 and over.

97.0% of residents lived in urban areas, while 3.0% lived in rural areas.

There were 4,137 households in Lake Monticello, of which 26.6% had children under the age of 18 living in them. Of all households, 59.6% were married-couple households, 11.1% were households with a male householder and no spouse or partner present, and 23.7% were households with a female householder and no spouse or partner present. About 22.7% of all households were made up of individuals and 12.3% had someone living alone who was 65 years of age or older.

There were 4,447 housing units, of which 7.0% were vacant. The homeowner vacancy rate was 1.6% and the rental vacancy rate was 5.2%.

Racial composition as of the 2020 census
Race	Number	Percent
White	8,382	82.8%
Black or African American	721	7.1%
American Indian and Alaska Native	21	0.2%
Asian	92	0.9%
Native Hawaiian and Other Pacific Islander	0	0.0%
Some other race	165	1.6%
Two or more races	745	7.4%
Hispanic or Latino (of any race)	462	4.6%

=== 2000 census ===
As of the census of 2000, there were 6,852 people, 2,754 households, and 2,194 families residing in the CDP. The population density was 780.9 people per square mile (301.5 people/km^{2}). There were 2,950 housing units at an average density of 336.2 units per square mile (129.8 units/km^{2}). The racial makeup of the CDP was 94.06% White, 3.50% African American, 0.16% Native American, 0.51% Asian, 0.03% Pacific Islander, 0.28% from other races, and 1.46% from two or more races. Hispanic or Latino of any race were 1.49% of the population.

There were 2,754 households, out of which 32.1% had children under the age of 18 living with them, 70.8% were married couples living together, 6.7% had a female householder with no husband present, and 20.3% were non-families. 15.8% of all households were made up of individuals, and 5.7% had someone living alone who was 65 years of age or older. The average household size was 2.49 and the average family size was 2.77.

In the CDP, the population was spread out, with 23.6% under the age of 18, 3.7% from 18 to 24, 31.0% from 25 to 44, 23.4% from 45 to 64, and 18.3% who were 65 years of age or older. The median age was 39 years. For every 100 females there were 92.6 males. For every 100 females age 18 and over, there were 89.3 males.

The median income for a household in the CDP was $55,556, and the median income for a family was $63,641. Males had a median income of $43,319 versus $30,332 for females. The per capita income for the CDP was $25,226. About 1.2% of families and 1.8% of the population were below the poverty line, including 1.1% of those under age 18 and 1.3% of those age 65 or over.
