= Morven (Simeon, Virginia) =

Historic house in Virginia, United States

- U.S. National Register of Historic Places
- Virginia Landmarks Register
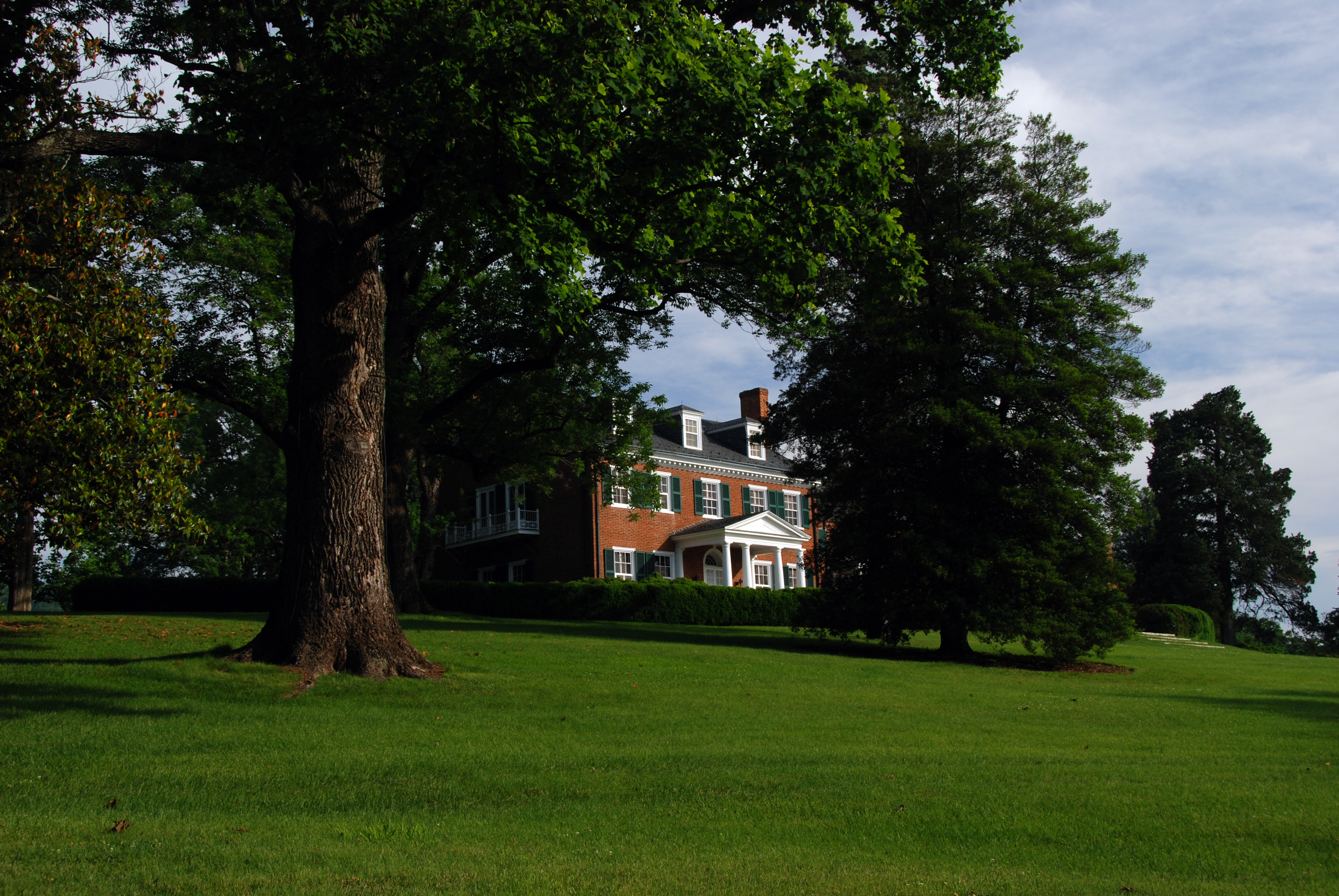
- Morven, June 2009

- Location within Virginia Location within the United States
- Location: West of Simeon off VA 20, near Simeon, Virginia
- Coordinates: 37°57′48″N 78°28′26″W
- Area: 640 acres (260 ha)
- Built: 1821
- NRHP reference No.: 73001991
- VLR No.: 002-0054

Significant dates
- Added to NRHP: April 24, 1973
- Designated VLR: February 20, 1973

Morven is a historic home and farm located near Simeon, Albemarle County, Virginia. It was built about 1821, and consists of a two-story, five bay by two bay, brick main block with a two-story, three bay brick wing. The front facade features a one-bay porch with a pedimented gable roof and Tuscan order entablature, supported by four Tuscan columns. Also on the property are the contributing office and frame smokehouse.

It was added to the National Register of Historic Places in 1973.

Today the house and farm are the site of the University of Virginia's Sustainability Lab, after a gift to the University of Virginia by John Kluge.
