= Simeon, Virginia =

Unincorporated community in Virginia, United States

Simeon
- Unincorporated community
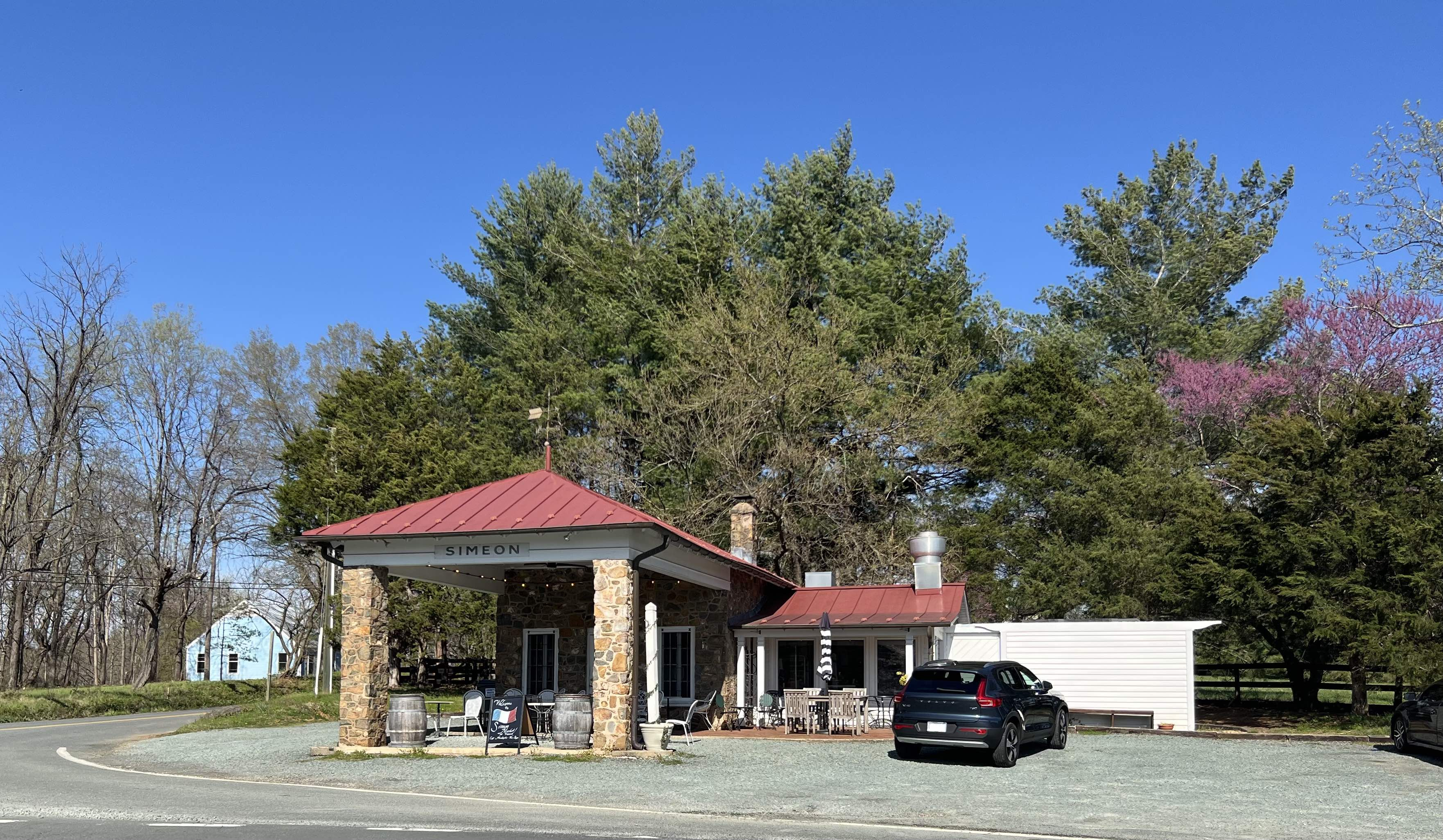

- Location within the Commonwealth of Virginia Simeon (the United States)
- Coordinates: 37°59′30″N 78°26′39″W
- Country: United States
- State: Virginia
- County: Albemarle
- Time zone: UTC−5 (Eastern (EST))
  - Summer (DST): UTC−4 (EDT)
- GNIS feature ID: 1477755

Simeon is an unincorporated community in Albemarle County, Virginia, United States.

Morven, Highland, and Sunnyfields are listed on the National Register of Historic Places.
