= Monroe Hill =

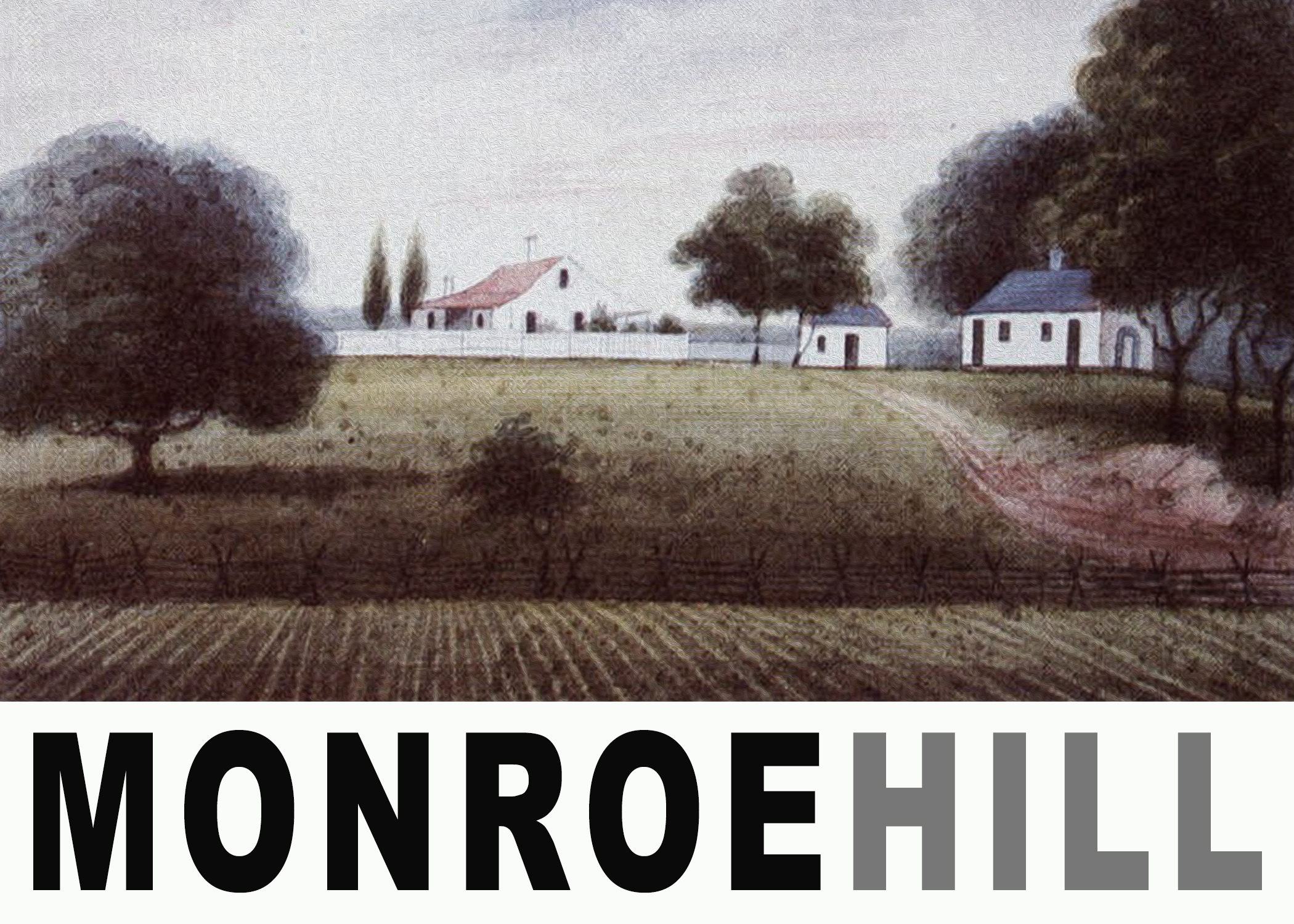
- Official Poster
- Directed by: Eduardo Montes-Bradley
- Written by: Eduardo Montes-Bradley
- Produced by: Soledad Liendo
- Starring: Dan Preston, Sara Bon-Harper, Scott Harris, William Ferraro
- Distributed by: Kanopy Alexander Street Press
- Release date: November 6, 2015 (Virginia Film Festival)
- Running time: 52 minutes
- Country: United States
- Language: English
- Budget: $146,000

Monroe Hill is a 2015 documentary film by Eduardo Montes-Bradley made possible, in part, through an award from the Jefferson Trust. The film traces the roots, and historical context, of James Monroe's first home in Albemarle County, and its transformation over a period of three decades until the laying of the cornerstone at the University of Virginia on October 6, 1817. Monroe Hill premiered during the 28th edition of the Virginia Film Festival, on November 6, 2015, and was selected to compete in the Official Selection of the Richmond International Film Festival, 2016. Monroe Hill premiered on PBS on March 28, 2016.

== Synopsis ==
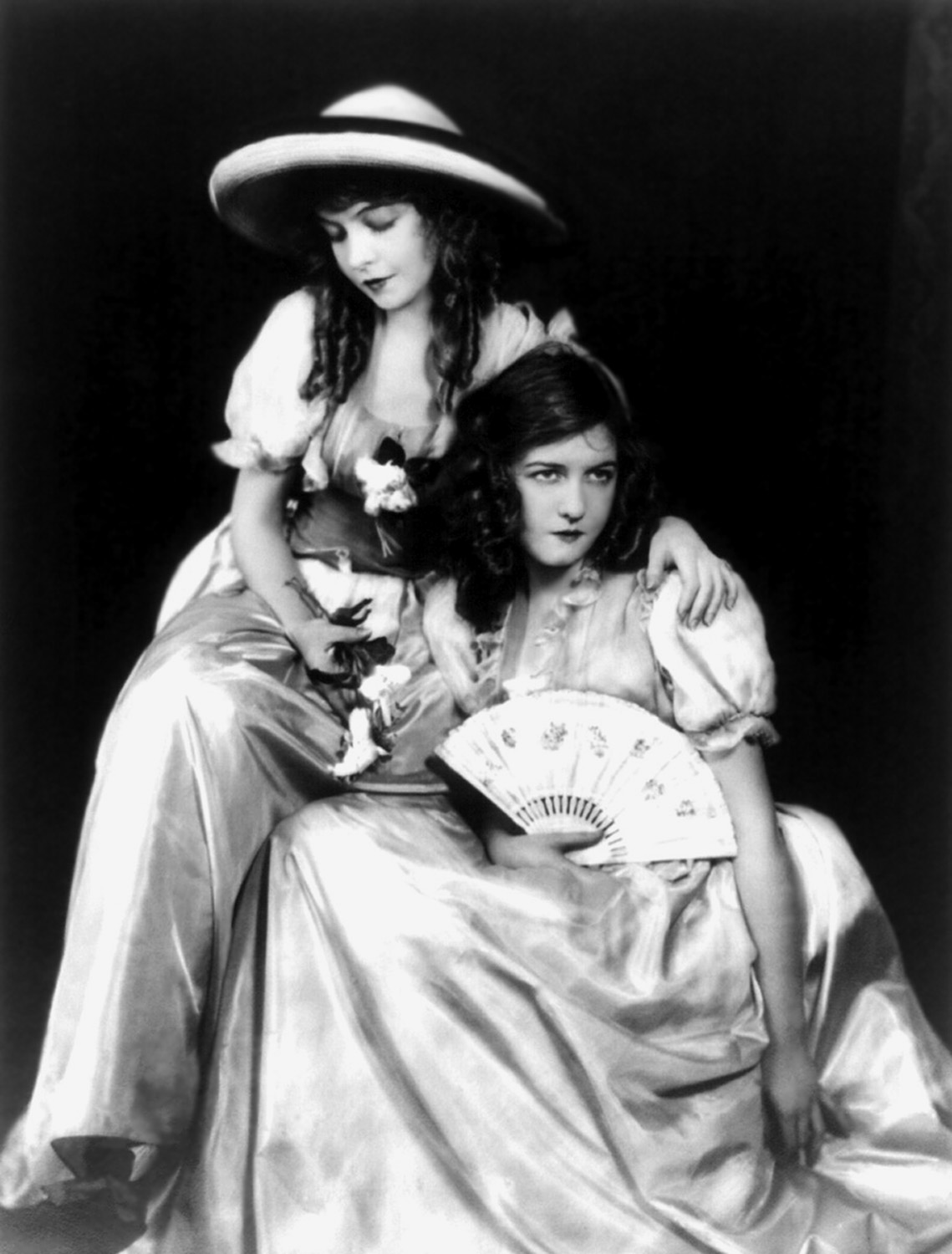
Lilian and Dorothy Gish from Orphans of the Storm

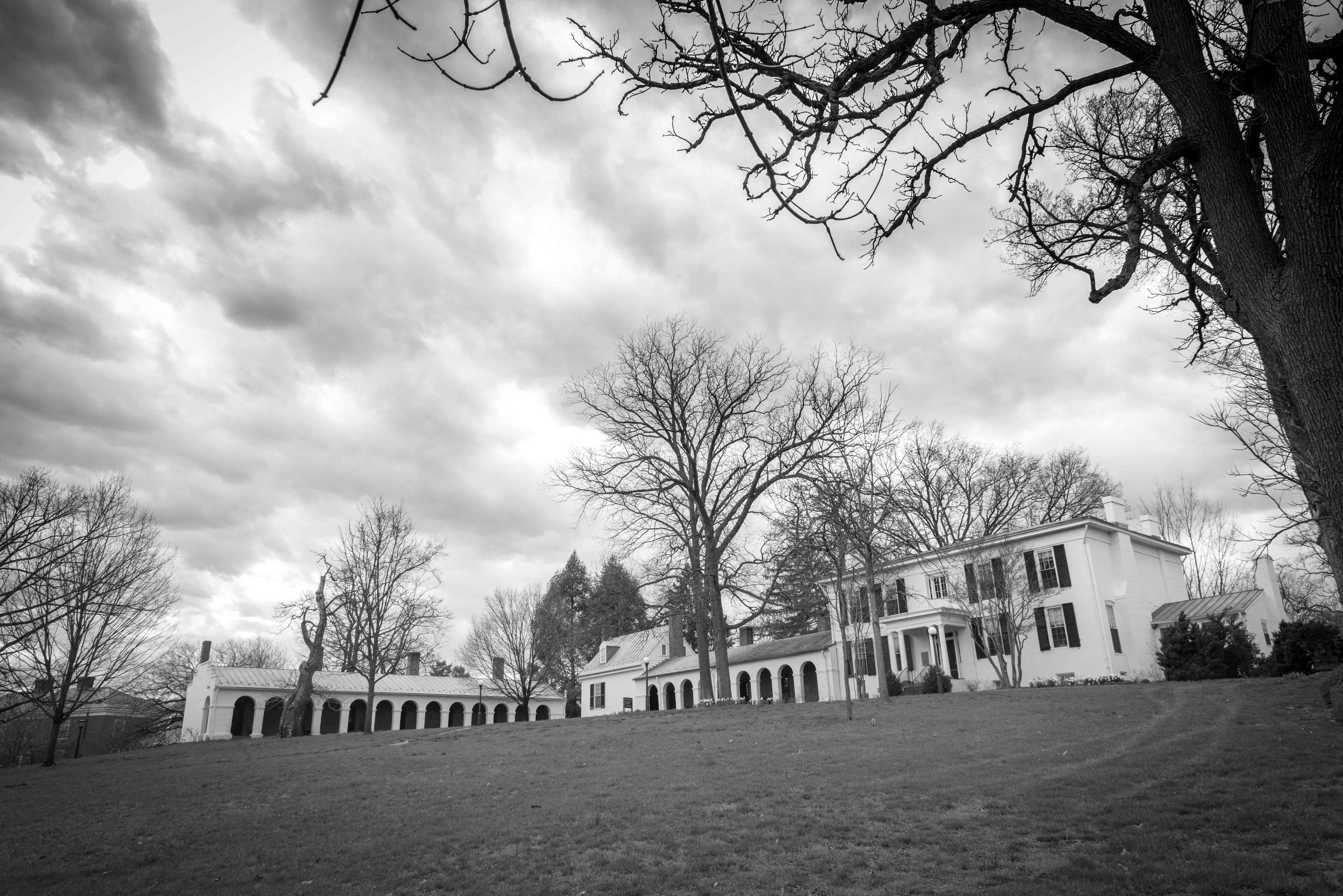
Monroe Hill: The eclectic, L-Shaped compound includes the James Monroe Law Office, c.1790, the Perry Mansion, and the colonnade wings.

Through a number of interviews with experts and academics, Monroe Hill unearths the history of the site that contains the last remaining structures of the late 18th century southern plantation. These surviving structures are silent witnesses to Monroe's struggle as a farmer and a politician from 1789 through 1817. The film includes the chapter of James Monroe's life as Minister to France and his relationship with Thomas Paine, Tom Wolfe, Adrienne de La Fayette, George Washington, Thomas Jefferson, James Madison and Alexander Hamilton.

Featuring extensive documentation, interviews, and footage from D. W. Griffith's America and Orphans of the Storm, the film brings to light an unexplored period of the life of James Monroe. The director resorts to the backdrop of Colonial Williamsburg in the late 1910s and early 1920s—as seen in Griffith's America—to recreate the experience of Monroe in Charlottesville at the turn of the 18th century: sequences and isolated scenes from Orphans of the Storm will also serve the purpose of illustrating the life of James Monroe from 1794—shortly after his arrival as Minister Plenipotentiary in 1794—until his return to the United States.

Monroe Hill is an investigation of a space stationary in time, an archeologically challenging experience that explores a place as well as the people that helped to transform it; thus, challenging the idea of a mythical birthplace of the University of Virginia. The film also explores other similar properties owned by James Monroe during the last decade of the 18th century, such as Limestone Plantation.

Monroe Hill was shot on location at the University of Virginia and various other locations in Paris, Philadelphia, Richmond, Washington, Fredericksburg and New York. The film was made possible with an award of $85,000 from the Jefferson Trust, an initiative of the Alumni Association of the University of Virginia.

== Billing Block ==
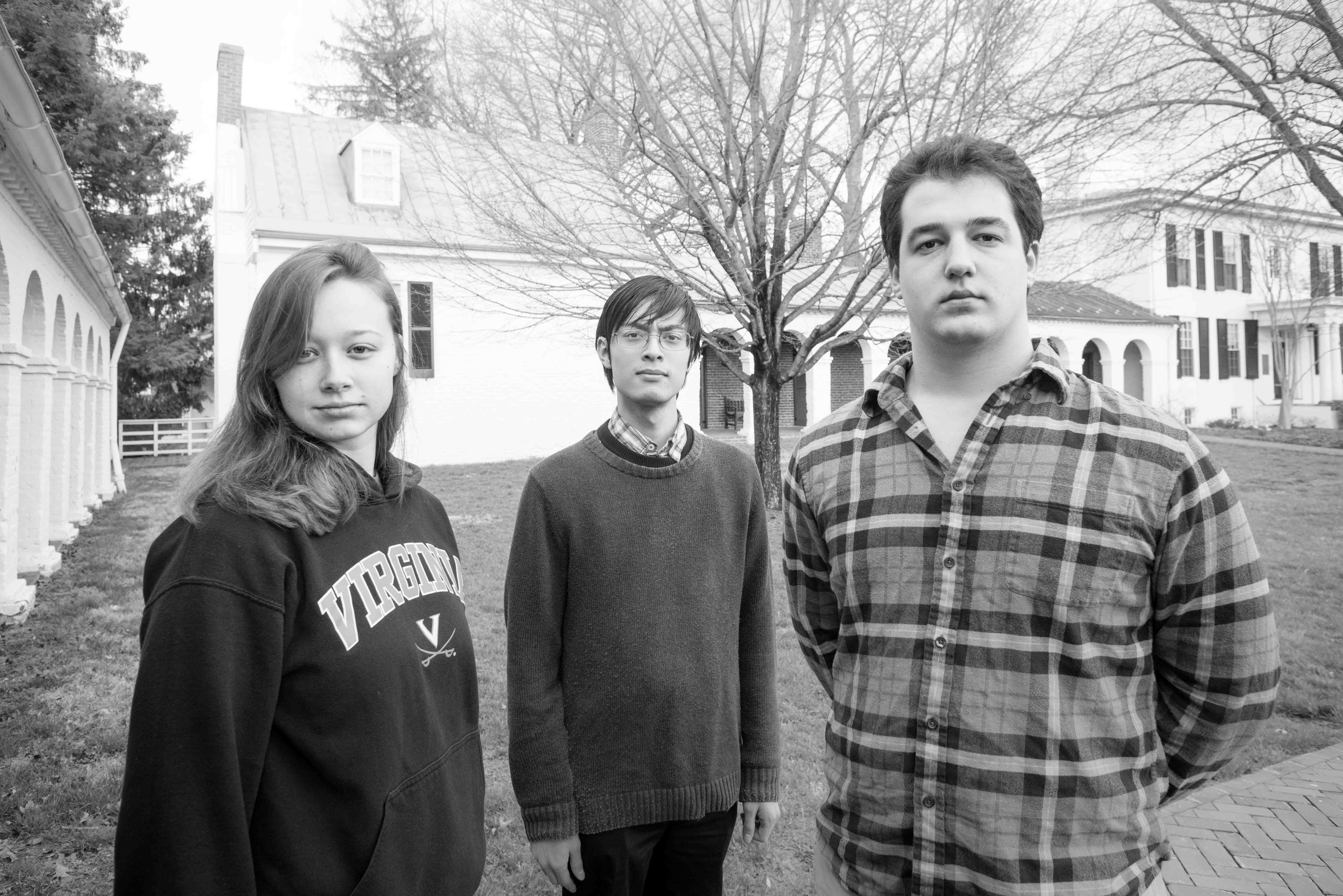
Production still showing students working on the set of Monroe Hill the University of Virginia.

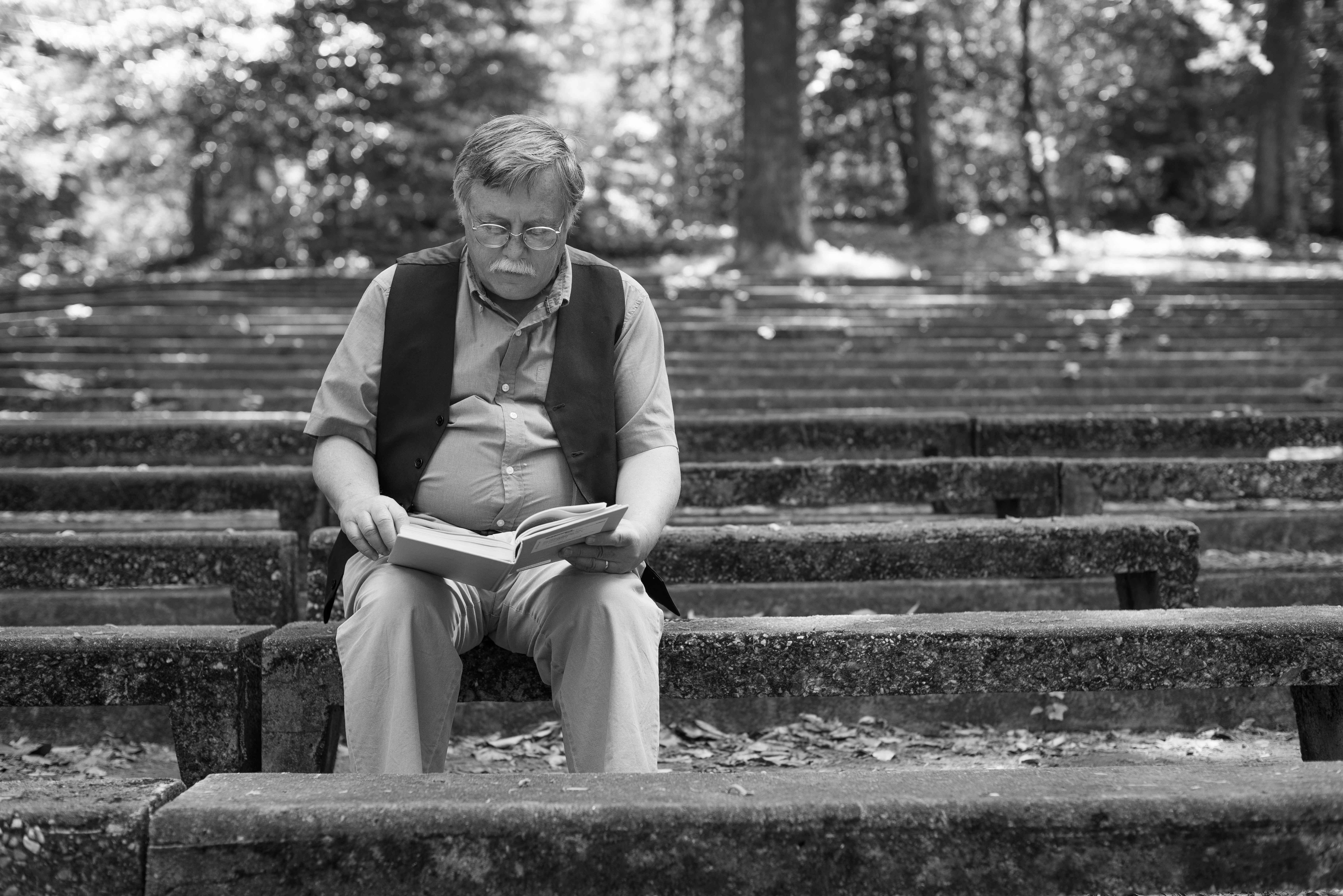
Daniel Preston, founder and editor of The Papers of James Monroe. (UMW)

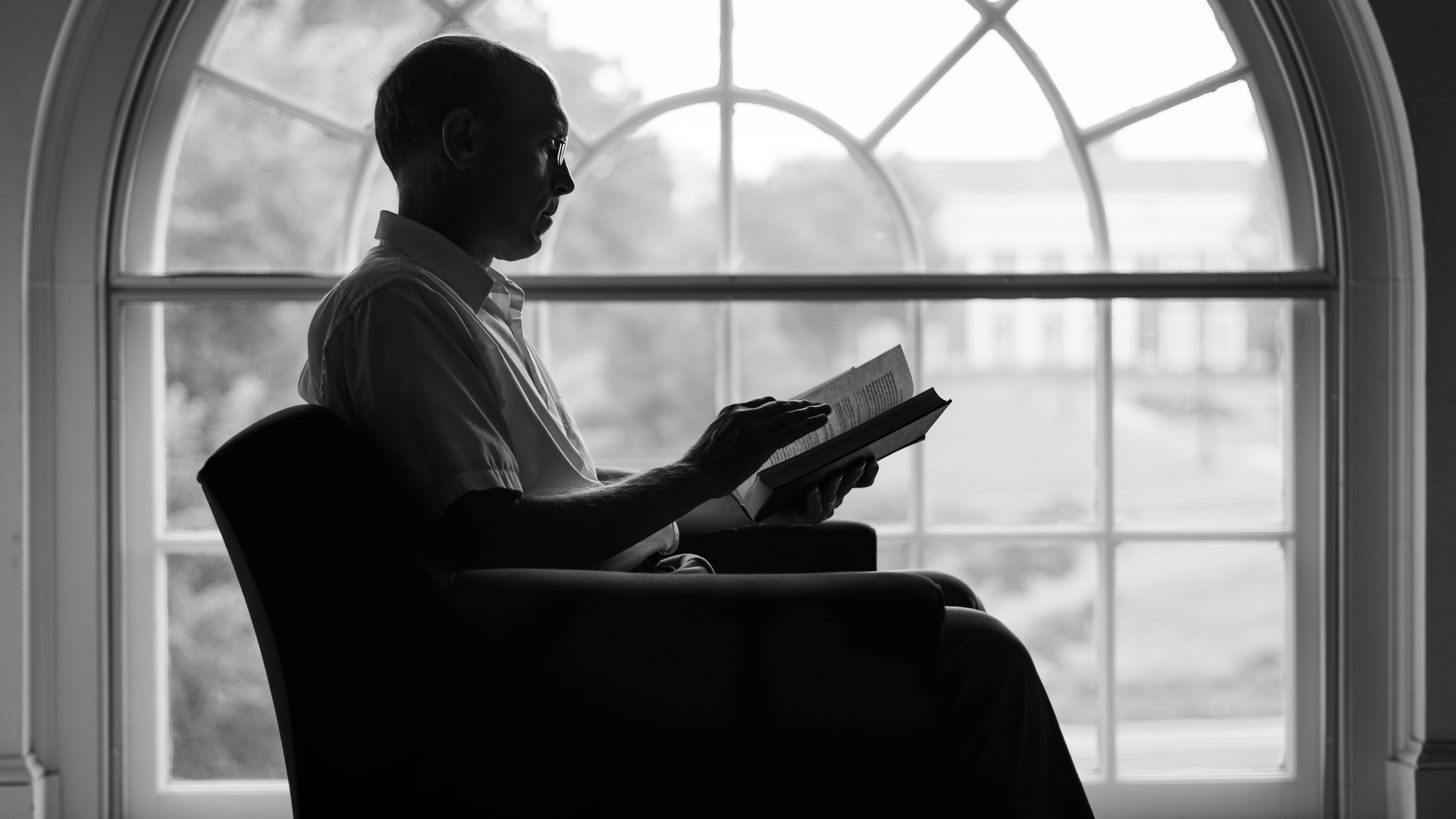
William Ferraro, Washington Papers. University of Virginia.

Heritage Film Project presents Monroe Hill a film by Eduardo Montes-Bradley made possible through an award from The Jefferson Trust in collaboration with Brown Residential College | School of Education and Human Development (formerly the Curry School of Education) | Ash Lawn-Highland with the support of the Office of the Provost & Vice Provost of the Arts | The Papers of James Monroe | Washington Papers | The James Monroe Museum and Library | The Presidential Precinct historical consultant Dan Preston additional consultants William Ferraro & Scott Harris featuring interviews with Dan Preston | Scott Harris | Sara Bon-Harper | Benjamin Ford | Kat Imhoff | William Ferraro | Louis Nelson | Kyle Edwards | Carl O. Trindle | Erik Midelfort | Anne McKeithen & Richard Guy Wilson sound mixer Kathleen Mueller executive producers Melissa Thomas-Hunt | Stephen Plaskon | Eduardo Montes-Bradley | silent film advisor David Shepard | Soledad Liendo producer Soledad Liendo writer-director Eduardo Montes-Bradley. As many as twenty-five students worked at different times on the production of Monroe Hill the documentary. The students, all residents of Brown College, one of three residential colleges at the University of Virginia, worked on the development, production, and postproduction of the film. 60 minutes | HD | 16:9 Final credits list a dedication in memory of Kurt Hilburger, fourth-year archeology and anthropology double major who assisted Montes-Bradley's research, and acted as his personal driver on location in Virginia. Hilburger died on September 30 from injuries sustained in a car accident, shortly before the premiere of Monroe Hill.

== Contributions ==
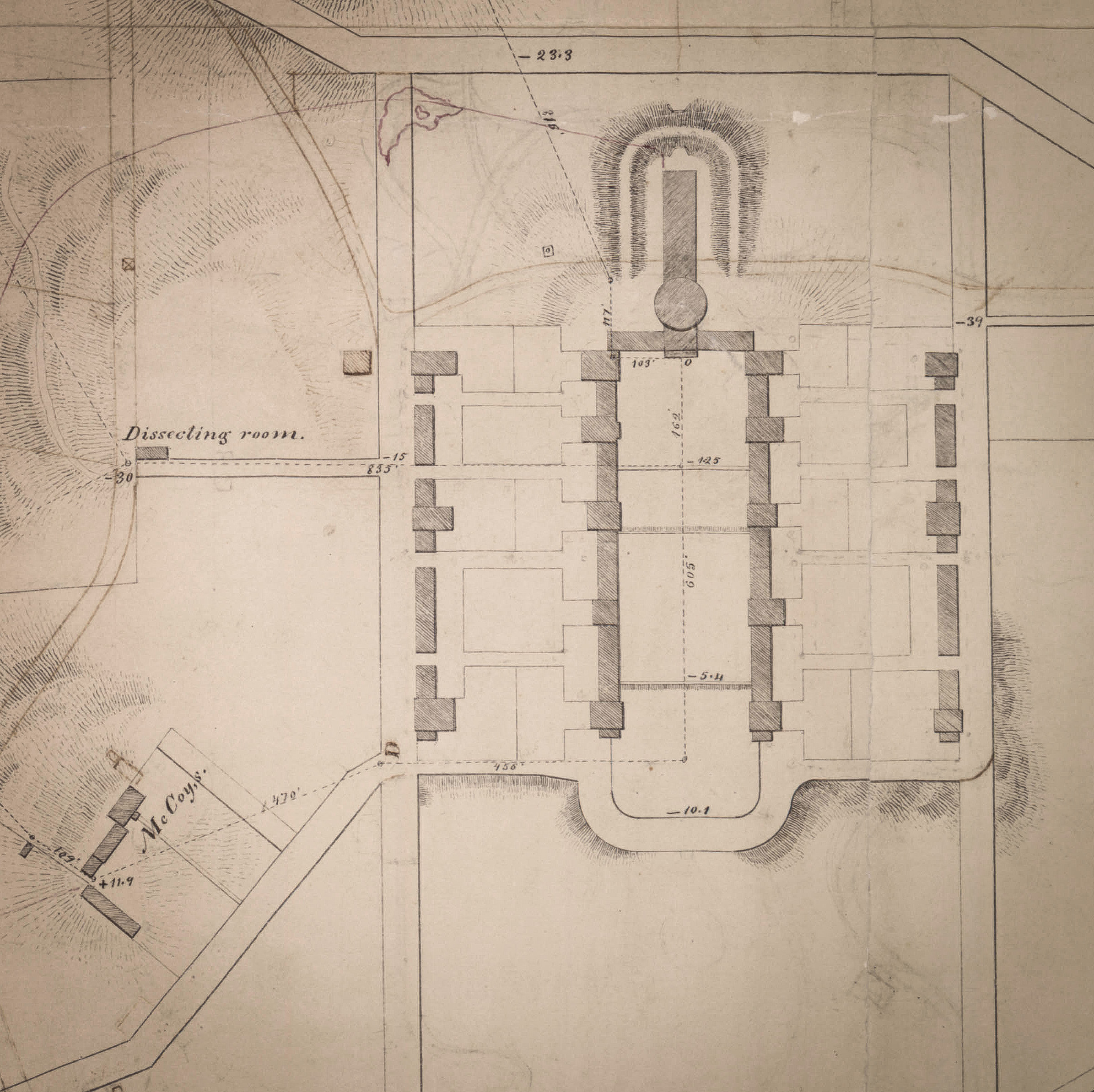
The 1856 Ellet map points the exact location of the buildings on Monroe Hill before the Civil War

Monroe Hill reveals details found in James Monroe's property taxes during the decade he occupied the property known as Monroe Hill in Albemarle County. These records were used to corroborate Monroe's presence in the plantation in the periods between his deployment astute senator in Philadelphia and in Paris as Minister Plenipotentiary. These records also constitute clear evidence of the number of slaves working on the plantation on a permanent basis. In the sample document provided for the year of 1797, Monroe is listed as a single resident with 12 adult slaves, 1 slave age of 12 to 16, and 11 horses. The research also shows that Monroe purchased from Monticello the enslaved woman named Thenia Hemings with five daughters. According to Monroe Hill, Thenia Hemings was Sally Hemings sister, six years her senior. The information concerning the purchase of Thenia Hemings was corroborated by the filmmakers on Annette Gordon-Reed’s The Hemingses of Monticello: An American Family. However, based on the correspondence between James Monroe and Joseph Jones, the filmmaker’s research goes further into the personal life of Thenia Hemings. According to Monroe Hill, Thenia Hemings gave birth to a sixth child during the winter of 1795, and Thenia died a year later in the plantation. Monroe Hill also suggests that Thenia was presumably buried in the African American cemetery recently discovered and reconsecrated on grounds at the University of Virginia and that her partner and possible father of her children was the enslaved man known as Peter, the gardener. The film also explores the period in which James Monroe resigned in Paris as Minister Plenipotentiary of the United States revealing aspects of his relationship with Thomas Paine, Wolfe Tone, and Adrienne de La Fayette.

== Structure ==
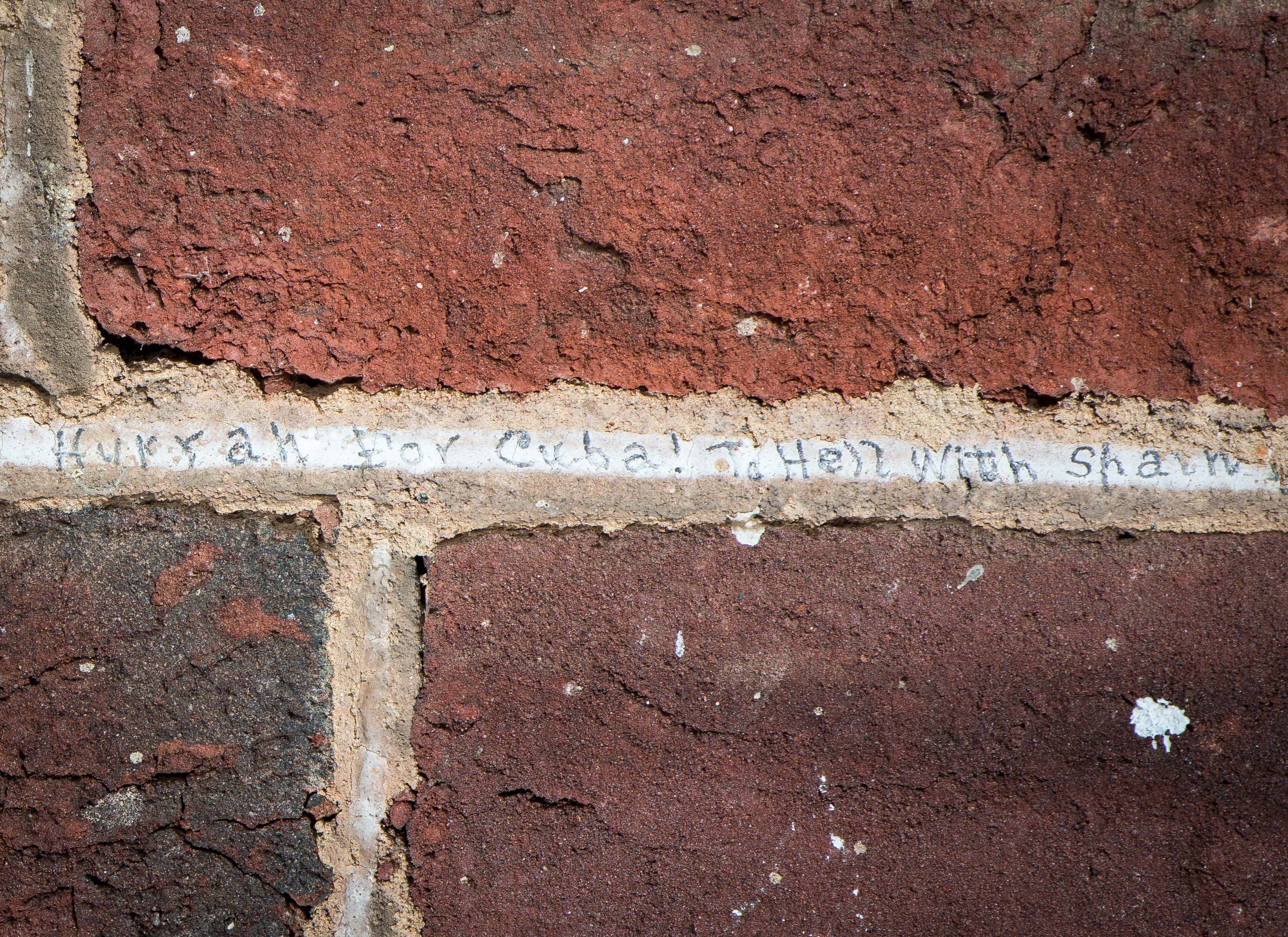
Inscription on the mortar between bricks at Monroe Hill. Testimonial of students who lived through the Spanish–American War at James Monroe College at the University of Virginia.

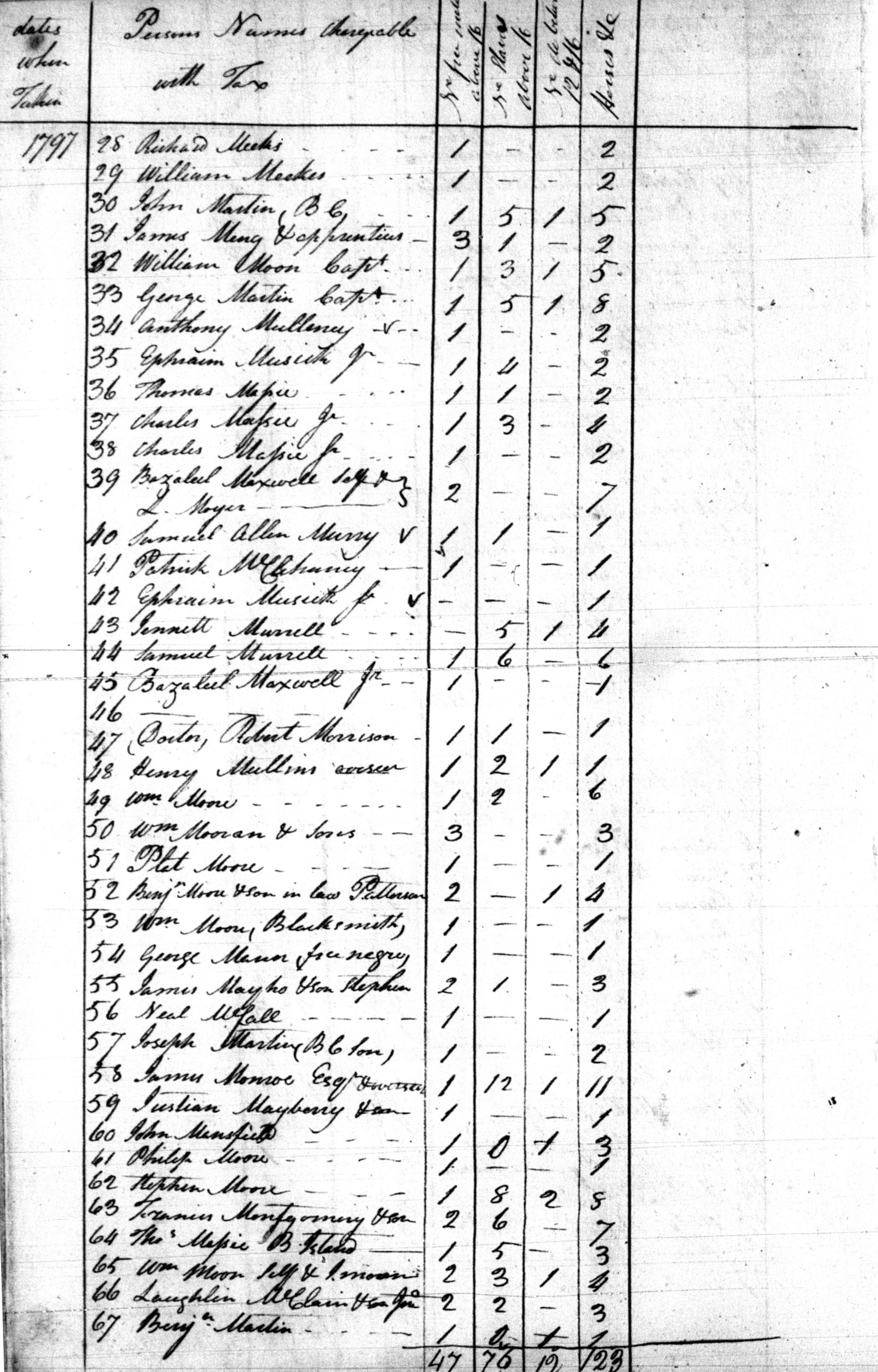
Albemarle County Property Taxes, 1797

Monroe Hill is a documentary structured and edited as a written essay or dissertation. Includes a Preface, seven chapters and a coda or epilogue. The dynamic-script developed with research, interviews, and findings while the film was being filmed and edited. With regards to the experience of working over an extended period of time, and without an established agenda or script William Ferraro said that: "Monroe Hill has been a much more dynamic experience. Rather than one day sitting in a room with a group to chart scenes and another afternoon on a stage filming comments, (the director) has encouraged reaction and rethinking to various cuts of the film and sought out a variety of settings for both their visual appeal and historical significance. His goal has been to place modern scholars in dialogue with each other in a way that initiates a conversation about Monroe's property and its place in the launch of the new nation. This is much different from using modern scholars in a didactic manner to tell viewers something final and conclusive."

== Soundtrack ==
The soundtrack is composed exclusively of vintage recordings with a clear vinyl undertone. Most of these recordings originated from the catalog of Discos Qualiton and include the Piano Sonata No. 14 in C minor, K. 457 and "Six sonatas for flute and harpsichord" by Wolfgang Amadeus Mozart, Mozart's aria "Misero! o sogno", K.431; "Warum?" from Fantasiestücke by Robert Shumann, and "Carry me back to old Virginny”. The final mix for the soundtrack was completed at In Your Ear Studios in Richmond, Va.
