= Highland (James Monroe house) =

Former Home of 5th President, James Monroe

- U.S. National Register of Historic Places
- Virginia Landmarks Register
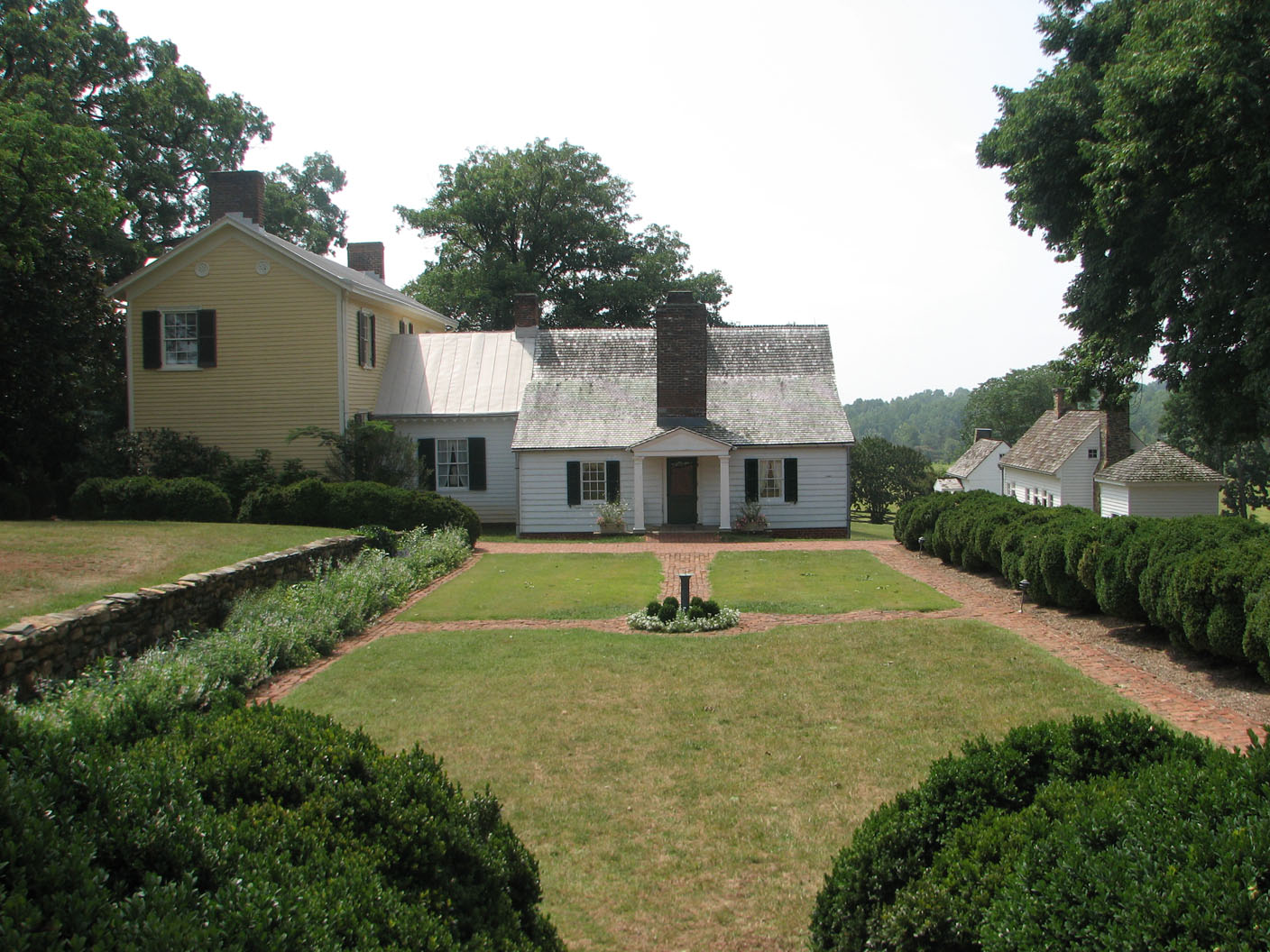
- Highland, formerly Ash Lawn–Highland. Note: The yellow wing was added on by later owners.

- Location within Virginia Location within the United States
- Location: Southeast of Charlottesville off VA 53, near Simeon, Virginia
- Coordinates: 37°58′56″N 78°27′19″W
- Area: 200 acres (81 ha)
- Built: 1799
- Architect: James Monroe
- NRHP reference No.: 73001990

Significant dates
- Added to NRHP: August 14, 1973
- Designated VLR: January 16, 1973

Highland, formerly Ash Lawn–Highland, located near Charlottesville, Virginia, United States, and adjacent to Thomas Jefferson's Monticello, was the estate of James Monroe, a Founding Father and fifth president of the United States. Purchased in 1793, Monroe and his family permanently settled on the property in 1799 and lived at Highland for twenty-five years. Personal debt forced Monroe to sell the plantation in 1825. Before and after selling Highland, Monroe spent much of his time living at the plantation house at his large Oak Hill estate near Leesburg, Virginia. Before owning Highland, Monroe's original local estate was Monroe Hill in Charlottesville, with his residence and law office now comprising the oldest extant buildings at the University of Virginia.

Monroe named this estate "Highland". For many years after Monroe's death until 2016, the house was known as Ash Lawn-Highland or merely Ash Lawn. The estate is now owned, operated and maintained by Monroe's alma mater, the College of William & Mary.

== History ==
=== Monroe establishes Highland ===
Encouraged by his close friend, Thomas Jefferson, Monroe purchased one thousand acres (4 km^{2}) of land adjacent to Monticello in 1793 for one thousand pounds from the Carter family. The land formerly had been a part of the almost 10,000 acre land grant owned by Secretary John Carter. Six years later, Monroe moved his family onto the plantation, where they resided for the next twenty-five years. In 1800, Monroe described his home as: "One wooden dwelling house, the walls filled with brick. One story high, 40 by 30 ft. Wooden Wing one story high, 34 by 18 ft." Over the next 16 years, Monroe continued to add onto his home, adding stone cellars and a second story to the building. He also expanded his land holdings, which at their greatest included over 3,500 acres (14 km^{2}). However, by 1815, Monroe increasingly turned to selling his land to pay for debt. By 1825, he was forced to sell Highland completely.

=== Slave quarters ===
Highland was a thriving plantation employing the labor of 30-40 slaves. Their housing no longer exists. Quarters for field hands were at some distance from the main house, while the domestic slaves lived closer to the Monroe's home.

=== Highland after Monroe ===
Edward O. Goodwin purchased Highland from Monroe at twenty dollars an acre and referred to the property as "North Blenheim." At the time of the purchase, Monroe described Highland as containing:

a commodious dwelling house, buildings for servants and other domestic purposes, good stables, two barns with threshing machine, a grist and sawmill with houses for managers and laborers . . . all in good repair.

Goodwin sold the house and six hundred acres (2.4 km^{2}) in 1834 and it was sold again in 1837 to Alexander Garrett. Garrett gave the property its third name "Ash Lawn" which remained as part of its name until 2016. Over the course of thirty years, Ash Lawn–Highland was sold numerous times until 1867, when John E. Massey purchased it. It remained in the possession of the Massey family for the next sixty-three years. In that time period, the family added to the house, whereupon it took on its present-day appearance.

Highland was sold for the last time in 1930 to philanthropist Jay Winston Johns of Pittsburgh, Pennsylvania. The Johns family soon after opened the house to public tours and upon his death in 1974, Johns willed the property to James Monroe's alma mater, the College of William and Mary.

It was added to the National Register of Historic Places in 1973.

=== Highland today ===
The property today includes the 1818 guest house, an 1850s addition, and an 1870s Victorian style farmhouse. Also on the property are a reconstructed three-bay slave quarter, a reconstructed gable-roofed ice house, a gable-roofed overseer's cabin with an exterior end brick chimney, and a smokehouse with a pyramidal roof.

Highland was featured in Bob Vila's A&E Network production, Guide to Historic Homes of America and in C-SPAN's Cities Tour, Charlottesville.

In 2016, the name Ash Lawn-Highland was dropped, and the house was redesignated James Monroe's Highland to more clearly communicate the relationship to its first owner, President James Monroe.

Today, Highland is a 535-acre (2.2 km^{2}) working farm, museum, and a performance site for arts, operated by the College of William and Mary. It is open to the public year-round, though with limited hours from October through March.

=== Discovery of larger house ===
Evidence that this home, long believed to be an original wing of Monroe's residence, was in fact, a guest house, surfaced when archaeologists discovered the foundations of a much larger home presumed to be Monroe's home. Additional evidence for the current residence being a guest house include construction techniques that post-date Monroe moving into his mansion at the end of 1799, and dendrochronology which dates the existing structure as being made from trees harvested between 1815 and 1818.

== See also ==
- List of residences of presidents of the United States
- Presidential memorials in the United States
