= Belair, Florida (disambiguation) =

Belair, Florida is an unincorporated suburban community of Tallahassee in Leon County.

Belair, Florida, or similar, may also refer to:

- Bellair, Florida, an unincorporated suburban community of Jacksonville in Clay County
- Bel-Air (Sanford), a neighborhood of Sanford in Seminole County
- Belleair, Florida, a town in Pinellas County, Florida

== See also ==
- Belleair Beach, Florida in Pinellas County
- Belleair Bluffs, Florida in Pinellas County
- Belleair Shore, Florida in Pinellas County
- Belair (disambiguation)
- Bel Air (disambiguation)
- Bel-Aire (disambiguation)
- Bellair (disambiguation)
- Bellaire (disambiguation)
