= Belair Mansion =

Belair Mansion may refer to:

- Belair Mansion (Bowie, Maryland), a historic home built in Collington, Maryland c. 1745, home to two colonial governors of Maryland and having influenced thoroughbred horse racing as one of only two stables to raise two Triple Crown champions
- Belair (Nashville, Tennessee), a historic home built in Nashville, Tennessee in the 1830s, home to a Mayor of Nashville

== See also ==
- Belair (disambiguation)
- Bel Air (disambiguation)
- Bel-Aire (disambiguation)
- Belleair, Florida
- Bellaire (disambiguation)
