= Belair =

Belair or Bélair may refer to:

== People ==
- Bianca Belair, wrestler
- Sanité Bélair (1781–1802), Haitian freedom fighter
- Anne Liger-Belair, Belgian writer known as Anne Duguël

== Places ==
=== Historic locations ===
- Belair (Nashville, Tennessee), United States
- Belair Development, Maryland, United States
- Belair Mansion (Bowie, Maryland), United States

=== Inhabited places ===
==== Australia ====
- Belair, South Australia
- Belair National Park, South Australia

==== United States ====
- Belair, Florida
- Belair, South Carolina
- Belair, initial name of Grovetown, Georgia

==== Other inhabited places ====
- Belair, Luxembourg
- Belair Park, London, England

== Other uses ==
- Belair (airline), an airline in Switzerland
- Belair Stud a horseracing dynasty in Collington, Maryland
- Château Bélair-Monange, formerly Château Belair, a Bordeaux wine producer in Saint-Émilion, France

== See also ==
- Bel Air (disambiguation)
- Bel-Aire (disambiguation)
- Belair Mansion (disambiguation)
- Bellair (disambiguation)
- Bellairs, a surname
- Belleair, Florida
- Bellaire (disambiguation)
