= Bellair =

Bellair may refer to:

- Bellair, Missouri, unincorporated community
- Bellair, Florida, unincorporated community
- Bellair (New Bern, North Carolina), building in North Carolina
- Bellair (Virginia), building in Virginia
- Bellair, townland in County Antrim, Northern Ireland
- T. S. Bellair (1825–1893), Australian actor and publican

== See also ==
- Belleair, Florida
- Bellaire (disambiguation)
- Bellairs
- Bel Air (disambiguation)
- Belair (disambiguation)
- Bel-Aire (disambiguation)
