= Bellairs =

Bellairs is a surname. Notable people with that surname include:

- Angus Bellairs (1918–1990), British herpetologist and anatomist
- Bart Bellairs (born 1956), American basketball coach
- Carlyon Bellairs (1871–1955), British Royal Navy officer
- Edmund Bellairs (1823–1898), New Zealand legislator
- George Bellairs (1902–1982), English crime writer
- John Bellairs (1938–1991), American author
- Mal Bellairs (1919–2010), American radio and television personality
- Nona Bellairs (1828–1897), British author
- William Bellairs (1828–1913), British army officer

== Fictional characters ==
- Kitty Bellairs, title character of a play and multiple films known as Sweet Kitty Bellairs

== See also ==
- Bellairs Research Institute on the island of Barbados
- Bellair (disambiguation)
- Belair (disambiguation)
- Bel Air (disambiguation)
- Bel-Aire (disambiguation)
- Belleair, Florida
- Bellaire (disambiguation)
