= Bel-Aire =

Bel-Aire, Bel Aire or Belaire may refer to:

== Places ==
- Bel-Aire, Calgary, neighbourhood in Canada
- Bel Aire, Kansas, city in the United States
- Bel Aire, Tiburon, California, United States
- Bel Aire (Charlottesville, Virginia), United States

== Other uses ==
- Belaire Apartments, a New York City apartment complex
- Belaire High School, a high school in Baton Rouge, Louisiana, United States
- Belaire Rosé, a French sparkling wine

== See also ==
- Bel Air (disambiguation)
- Belair (disambiguation)
- Bellair (disambiguation)
- Bellaire (disambiguation)
- Bellairs, a surname
- Belleair, Florida
