= Tallahassee Democrat =

Newspaper in Tallahassee, Florida

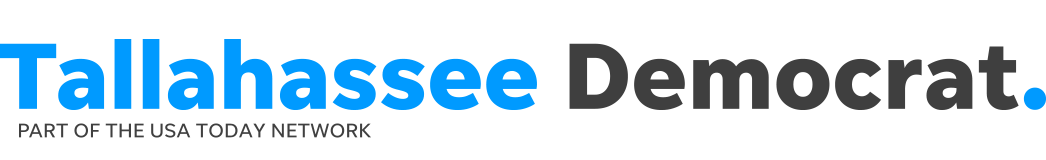

- Front page of the December 1, 2008, issue
- Type: Daily newspaper
- Format: Broadsheet
- Owner: USA Today Co.
- Founded: 1905
- Headquarters: 227 N. Bronough Street; Tallahassee, FL 32301
- Circulation: 5,599 Average print circulation 1,935 Digital Subscribers
- ISSN: 0738-5153
- Website: tallahassee.com

The Tallahassee Democrat is a daily broadsheet newspaper. It covers the area centered on Tallahassee in Leon County, Florida, as well as adjacent Gadsden County, Jefferson County, and Wakulla County. The newspaper is owned by Gannett Co., Inc., which also owns the Pensacola News Journal, the Fort Myers News-Press, and Florida Today, along with many other news outlets.

Knight Newspapers bought the Tallahassee Democrat in 1965. The Democrat was acquired by Gannett in August 2005 in a newspaper swap with Knight Ridder.

== History ==
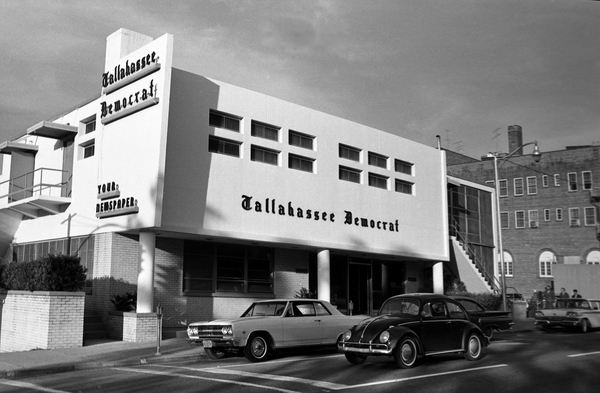
Tallahassee Democrat newspaper building in 1965

The first issue of the Weekly True Democrat was published March 3, 1905. Founding editor and publisher John G. Collins, a career printer and journalist, said the name came from the paper's promised dedication to "the true and tried principles of Old Time Democracy."

Three years later, in 1908, Collins contracted influenza and sold the newspaper to Milton Asbury Smith, an Alabama newspaperman and entrepreneur. Smith, an enthusiastic civic booster, operated the paper for 21 years. Smith guided the paper through a couple of name changes—the Semi-Weekly True Democrat, 1912–1913; Weekly True Democrat, 1914-1915—and initiated the change to a daily newspaper. Smith published daily during 1913 biannual session of the Florida Legislature, then resumed daily publication during the 1915 legislative session. Smith converted the paper permanently into an afternoon daily newspaper after the 1915 session and the next year adopted the name, The Daily Democrat, 1916–1949.

In 1929, with Smith facing financial problems and threatening to close the newspaper, city fathers persuaded Col. Lloyd Griscom to purchase the newspaper. Griscom was a scion of a prominent New York family that owned a plantation covering much of northeast Leon County (Tallahassee) and he operated newspapers on Long Island. Griscom ran the newspaper mostly as an absentee owner, ceding most decisions to his protege and publisher, John "Jack" Tapers. Tapers oversaw the changing of the newspaper's name to the Tallahassee Democrat in 1949 and construction of a new building in 1952. Griscom died in 1959, and ownership passed to his widow, Audrey.

In 1965, Audrey Griscom sold the Democrat to Knight Newspapers, giving the Democrat its first corporate owner. Knight Newspapers built the Democrat's previous plant, at 277 N. Magnolia Drive, in 1968, coinciding with the newspaper's switch from hot type to modern off-set printing. In 1974, Knight Newspapers merged with Ridder Publications to become Knight Ridder Inc. On January 3, 1978, the Democrat converted from an afternoon newspaper to a morning newspaper. In May of 2019, the newspaper moved its printing operation from its Magnolia Drive plant to its sister publication, the Panama City News Herald. In November of 2020, the Democrat sold its Magnolia Drive building, ultimately moving into its current offices at 227 N. Bronough Street in 2021.

Knight Ridder operated the Tallahassee Democrat until August 3, 2005, when the newspaper was acquired by its current owner, the Gannett Company.

At the time the paper was founded, Leon County and Florida as a whole were overwhelmingly Democratic. In the 1914 elections, Democratic candidates for two of Florida's congressional seats and for the Senate ran unopposed, and in the two contested districts, the Democratic candidates won by 98.8% and 99.3%. At the time, after the disenfranchisement of African Americans with the end of Reconstruction, the Democratic party was overwhelmingly the dominant party in the states of the former Confederacy (see Solid South); it was committed, in the South, to Jim Crow laws and racial discrimination.

In the mid-20th century, during the segregation period, the Democrat published a separate section for black subscribers. White subscribers received in its place the business section.

In 2006, fifty years after the Tallahassee bus boycott, the Democrat apologized for the pro-segregation stance from which it covered the boycott.

In March 2022, the Democrat moved to a six day printing schedule, eliminating its printed Saturday edition.
