= Bethlehem Missionary Baptist Church (Florida) =

Church in Florida

Coordinates: 29.2666406°N 82.2637087°W

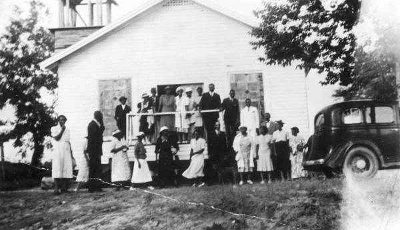
Bethlehem Missionary Baptist Church in the 1930s

Bethlehem Missionary Baptist Church was located south of Tallahassee, Florida in the unincorporated community of Belair and was moved to the Tallahassee Museum as one of its historical buildings. It was the first regularly, commenced black church in Florida.

== History ==
The church was founded by James Page in 1851 on cotton plantation property given to him by John Parkhill, his owner. Bethlehem Missionary was the first regularly organized black church in Florida according to the museum and was restored by Florida A & M University.

Before obtaining the official building, church members gathered on John Parkhill's plantation under the leadership of James Page. When James Page chose to move to Bel-Air, members began raising money through festivals and other means to buy the estate from John Parkhill, which was 250 dollars. Under James Page, Bethlehem Missionary Baptist Churches' values flourished beyond religion. The church was a made to be a safe place for commencement exercises, freed education, and places for fraternal civic organizations to hold meetings.

== Role in civil rights movement ==
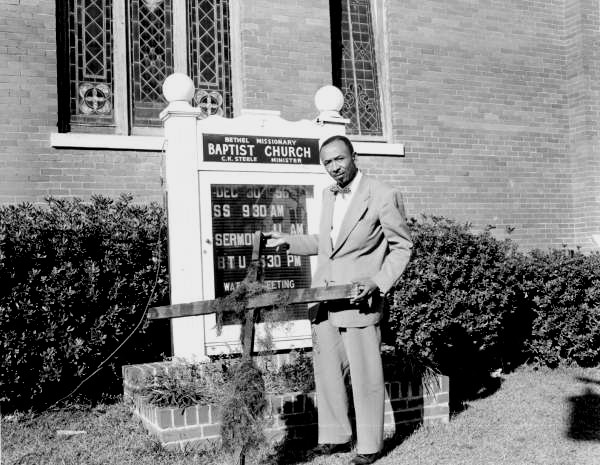
Reverend C.K. Steele with burnt cross

During the Civil Rights Movement, the church's reverend was Charles Kenzie Steele. He is a renowned Civil Rights Activity, particularly known for his miraculous guidance through the Tallahassee Bus Boycott. In response to his demonstrations, the Ku Klux Klan burned a cross and left it in front of the church on January 2nd, 1957. Cross burning is a sign of intimidation, but Steele utilized this situation to take a stance. He took a picture near the cross with the church included in the background to demonstrate his resolve.

== Bicentennial restoration project ==
Commenced by Florida A&M University's Black Church Restoration Committee along with their by Bicentennial Planning Committee under the area of Philosophy and Religion in 1976, this project aimed to refurnish and resettle the original Bethlehem Church at the Tallahassee Junior Museum. They sought to preserve the cultural, historical, and structural legacy that was left behind. According to the Bicentennial Restoration Project's pamphlet, the church was donated by Mr. and Mrs. Charles F Johnson. It was no larger than a storage shed only containing a single organ, pulpits, and pews.

== Legacy and reconstruction ==
Bethlehem Missionary Baptist Church was described as a building with a white single room covered by a tin roof and lit by kerosene lamps. The building was torn down in 1974 as the congregation wanted a larger space. They moved their praise elsewhere, and it was fully rebuilt in 1976. Now, grounded on Martin Luther King Street in Tallahassee, Florida, it is known as Bethel Missionary Baptist Church. The new building preserved the stained glass windows from the original estate. Now under the leadership of Reverend Dr. RB Holmes, Bethel Missionary Church excels in committing to the development of their community; they have nurtured the community in Frenchtown, developed a school, mall, housing and still have other various developments within the Tallahassee community.
