= Harry Cruse =

American politician

Harry Cruse (born 1840/1) was an American politician who served as state representative, state senator, and public official in Florida.

He served in the Florida State Senate from 1869 until 1870.

He represented Gadsden County in the Florida House of Representatives during the Reconstruction era from 1871 until 1874 and in 1877.

He was accused in testimony of being appointed to a patronage position as a timber agent and not doing any work as such. He testified about bribery allegations against state senator C. H. Pearce. He is described as having been allied with Marcellus Lovejoy Stearns.

== See also ==
- African American officeholders from the end of the Civil War until before 1900
