= Au Gringo's bar =

Au Gringo's bar is a Belgian novel by Anne Duguël. It was first published in 1998.

The novel is about Matt, a teen boy who wants to spend his holidays at his grandmother's, where he can see Lise, the girl he's secretly in love with. Unfortunately, he must travel to the Ecuador with his parents. Thanks to his encounter with an Ecuadorian child who leads him on an adventure in the jungle, he ends up enjoying the trip.

The book explores themes of protecting wildlife and endangered forests, as well as the relationship between teens and their parents.
