= Robert W. Saunders Sr. Public Library =

Public library in Tampa

Coordinates: 27.95814°N 82.45078°W

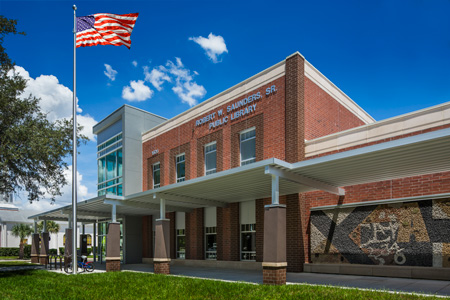
- Location: 1505 Nebraska Avenue, Tampa, Florida, U.S
- Type: Public library
- Established: August 12, 2015
- Architect: Russell Minardi

Other information
- Parent organization: Tampa-Hillsborough County Public Library System

The Robert W. Saunders Sr. Public Library is a member of the Tampa-Hillsborough County Public Library System (THPL) and the Hillsborough County Public Library Cooperative (HCPLC). Located on 1505 Nebraska Avenue in Tampa, Florida, the 26,244 square foot library is one of only two African-American research libraries in Florida. The library features art and history displays about African Americans in Tampa.

== History ==
In 1933, the Ybor City Branch Library opened in a storefront, donated by the local Italian American Club, L'Unione Italiana at 1729 East Broadway. At the time, L'Unione Italiana was one of the several ethnic clubs in Tampa which provided members with cultural enrichment activities, healthcare, and promoted civic engagement and cultural development in the fledgeling city. The library's collection featured materials in Spanish, Italian and English to accommodate the diverse population of Ybor City.

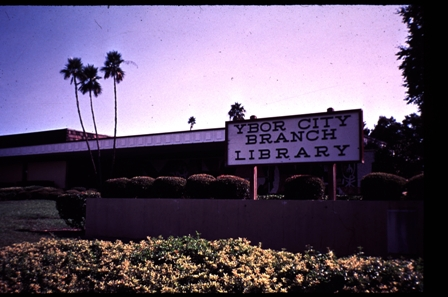
Ybor City Branch Library, replaced by the newer Saunders Branch.

Construction of a new building at 1505 North Nebraska Avenue, in an area once known as "the Scrub", was planned as part of the 1968 Model Cities Maryland Avenue Urban Renewal project. The new library, designed by architect Russell Minardi, was dedicated in January 1969. It featured a stone mural along the entrance wall entitled "Symbols of Mankind" by local artist and former professor Joe Testa-Secca. The mural reflects the great knowledge available at a library.

On November 5, 2003, the Ybor City Branch Library was renamed to honor Robert W. Saunders Sr. Who was a former Field Secretary of the NAACP. Saunders guided the state through challenging years as the South struggled for civil rights.

Demolition of the old building and groundbreaking to replace the nearly 45-year-old building currently located at 1505 N. Nebraska Ave. was held March 7, 2014. The new $7 million, two-story building was designed by the Harvard Jolly architecture firm.

Unlike the original opening of the Ybor City Branch Library in 1933, when no program to mark the opening took place, a ribbon-cutting ceremony was held on August 12, 2015, to celebrate the grand opening of the new Robert W. Saunders Sr. Public Library. Two pieces from the old library were incorporated into the new building: a bronze bust of Robert W. Saunders Sr., and the exterior stone mural called "Symbols of Mankind." The new library features a bookstore, a recording room for visitors to record their oral histories and stories, a children's room with movable furniture, and a 350-seat community room equipped with a full-size commercial kitchen. The new two-story library has a historical corridor dedicated to the history of African Americans in the area. It features exhibits showcasing the athletes, entertainers, churches and schools that were part of Tampa's past. The second floor houses a special collections resource center for African-American history and genealogy. It contains hundreds of digitalized oral histories and databases for research.

== Support ==
The Ybor City Branch Library was supported in part by the Italian Club benefit programs (for example, with proceeds from showings of "motion" pictures" of the group's coronation ceremony and annual cabaret dance) The predecessor to the current branch serving the area would not have been possible without the monetary support of the community. So too has the Robert W. Saunders Sr. Library benefited from the support of the larger Hillsborough County Library System and the community friends group.

The Robert W. Saunders Sr. Public Library is supported by Tampa-Hillsborough County Public Library System, the Ada T. Payne Friends of the Urban Libraries, and the Robert W. Saunders Foundation. The library also has a partnership with Booker T. Washington Elementary School, and a physical walkway connects the two buildings.

Instrumental to the library's success is the Ada T. Payne Friends of Urban Libraries organization, started in 2003. This is the Friends of Libraries group for the Robert W. Saunders Sr. Branch. Some specific highlights in terms of fundraisers that the group engages the community in are Jazz in the Stacks and Crowns and Teas. Robert Saunders, C. Blythe Andrews, and West Tampa Branch are the Tampa libraries which benefit from the organizational efforts of this group; and their close relationship to the nearby school has also influenced the Saunders branch development in terms of ease of access for the local students. In May 2009, groundbreaking was held for a walkway to connect the library with Booker T. Washington Elementary School. It was open for use by the students in September of the same year.

== Services ==
The library provides access to the full suite of Adobe Creative Cloud desktop apps by booking in advance or by a walk-in booking.

== Recognition ==
On October 18, 2019, the branch's Administrative Librarian Mrs. Carrie Hurst was honored with the 2020 Jean Key Gates Distinguished Alumni Award from the University of South Florida School of Information. The award recognizes "alumnus whose outstanding professional career achievements serve as a role model for all information science graduates". The Alice G. Smith Lecture featuring Jessamyn West (librarian) was held in connection with the recognition.

== Special collections and Attributes ==
- African-American History and Genealogy. "The Robert W. Saunders, Sr. Library Foundation raises funds that support educational, African American research and cultural activities at the Saunders Library and within the Tampa community." The Saunders Library has partnered with the neighboring Booker T. Washington Elementary, allowing access to facilities, a partnership that is unique to the location and geographic locations of the school and the library.
- Robert W. Saunders held the first Afro-Con, a "celebration of diverse superheroes", which had the aim of showing that fictional fantasy worlds which feature superheroes may include a diverse cast of characters who are black or brown. At the event, participants both celebrated and created culture, through activities such as an artist workshop, cosplay contest, fanart contest, and storytelling time focused on heroes. Open to all, this event falls in line with the Progressive Librarian Guild's commitment to uphold the Universal Declaration of Human Rights. Namely, this event advances progress toward the Universal Declaration of Human Rights' Article 27: "Everyone has the right freely to participate in the cultural life of the community, to enjoy the arts and to share in scientific advancement and its benefits.".
