= Charles Kenzie Steele =

American civil rights activist (1914–1980)

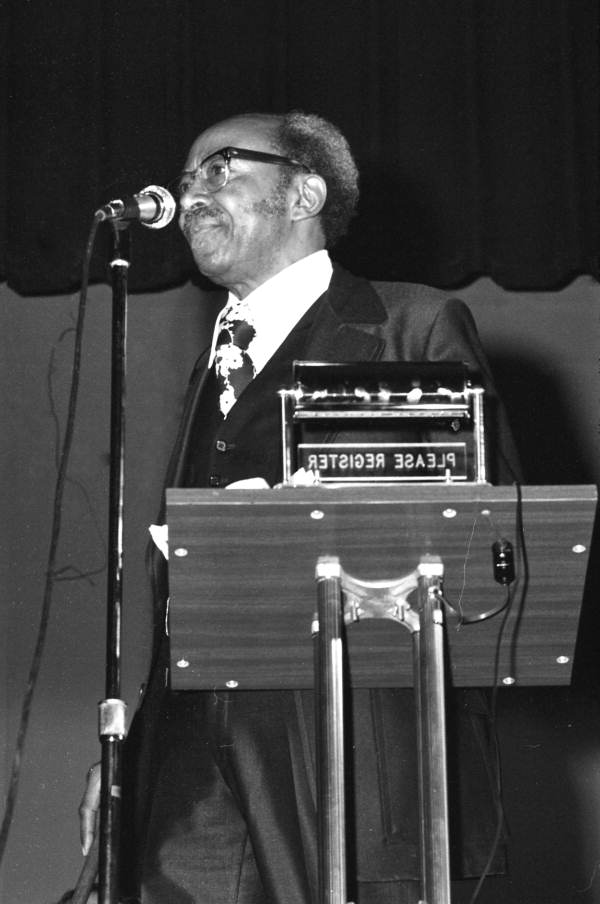
Tallahassee Civil rights leader Reverend C.K. Steele delivering a speech in an auditorium – Tallahassee, Florida.

Charles Kenzie Steele (February 17, 1914 – August 19, 1980) was a preacher and a civil rights activist. He was one of the main organizers of the 1956 Tallahassee bus boycott, and a prominent member of the Southern Christian Leadership Conference amongst other civil rights organizations. Steele dedicated time and efforts to desegregating schools and public transportation. The city of Tallahassee honored Steele by adding him to the Florida Civil Rights Hall of Fame, adding a statue of him to the bus terminal, and naming a charter school after him.

== Background ==
Steele was born into a coal mining family and was raised in Gary, West Virginia, a majorly black town. He knew from a young age that he wanted to be a preacher; he stayed true to this and began preaching when he was fifteen. Steele attended Morehouse College and graduated in the year 1938. He later became a pastor in Toccoa, Georgia, Augusta, Georgia, and Montgomery, Alabama, at the Hall Street Baptist Church. In 1952, Steele moved to Tallahassee, where he served at the Bethel Baptist Church.

== Views and actions ==
Steele shared Martin Luther King Jr.'s views of gaining social equality through nonviolent actions and movements. He became a speaker at nonviolence and social change conferences, supported the Southern Christian Leadership Conference and the Poor People's Campaign, and coordinated a Vigil for Poverty to acknowledge those who lack their basic necessities.

Steele was the first Vice President of the Southern Christian Leadership Conference, head of the local National Association for the advancement of Colored People, and president of the Inter-Civic Council (ICC).

The actions of the ICC gave hope to those involved in the civil rights movement. Steele viewed the movement as having both pain and promise (Steele, 27 September 1978).

He was asked to gather other black ministers in southern states to fight the Jim Crow laws together. He took part in freedom rides, voter registration campaigns, and marches.

Steele participated in the Selma to Montgomery marches in 1965.

Along with Steele's civil rights efforts, he held leadership positions in religious organizations; such as the Florida Baptist Convention and Morehouse College's seminary division.

Throughout the 1960s, Steele continued his dedication to eliminating discrimination in all southern public facilities.

== Tallahassee bus boycott ==
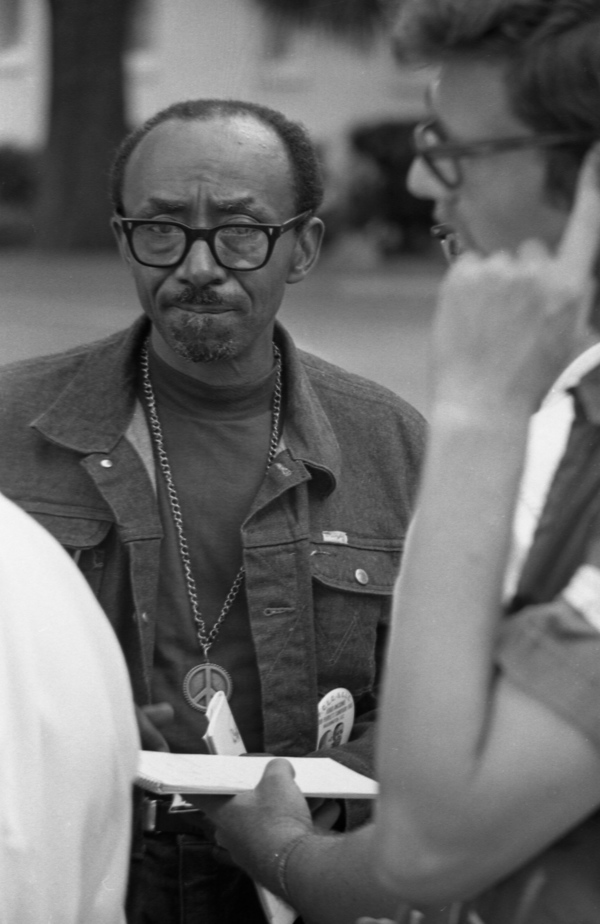
Steele at the Capitol for silent vigil supporting government aid to the poor in 1968.

The Tallahassee bus boycott began in May 1956, at the same time that the Montgomery bus boycott was occurring. Like other bus boycotts during the Civil Rights Movement in America, it started because black people were forced to ride in the back of the bus, and when two students refused to give up their seat to a white woman, they were arrested. The Inter-Civic Council was formed to protest and boycott against the city bus system. Steele and other protesters boycotted the system, using carpools as transportation instead. Following these actions, the bus system stopped for the first time in 17 years.

The people in Tallahassee thought that the protesters' demands were outrageous. Steele and other protesters met a lot of opposition, he was arrested multiple times. The Ku Klux Klan went as far as burning a cross in front of Steele's church and throwing bottles through the windows of his home.

== Legacy ==
Steele's determination and work led to integration in the bus system, as well as desegregation in public schools in Leon County, FL.

In 1980, Florida State University awarded Steele an honorary Doctor of Humane Letters. This was the first time FSU granted this kind of degree to an African American, and was also the first honorary degree granted in 56 years.

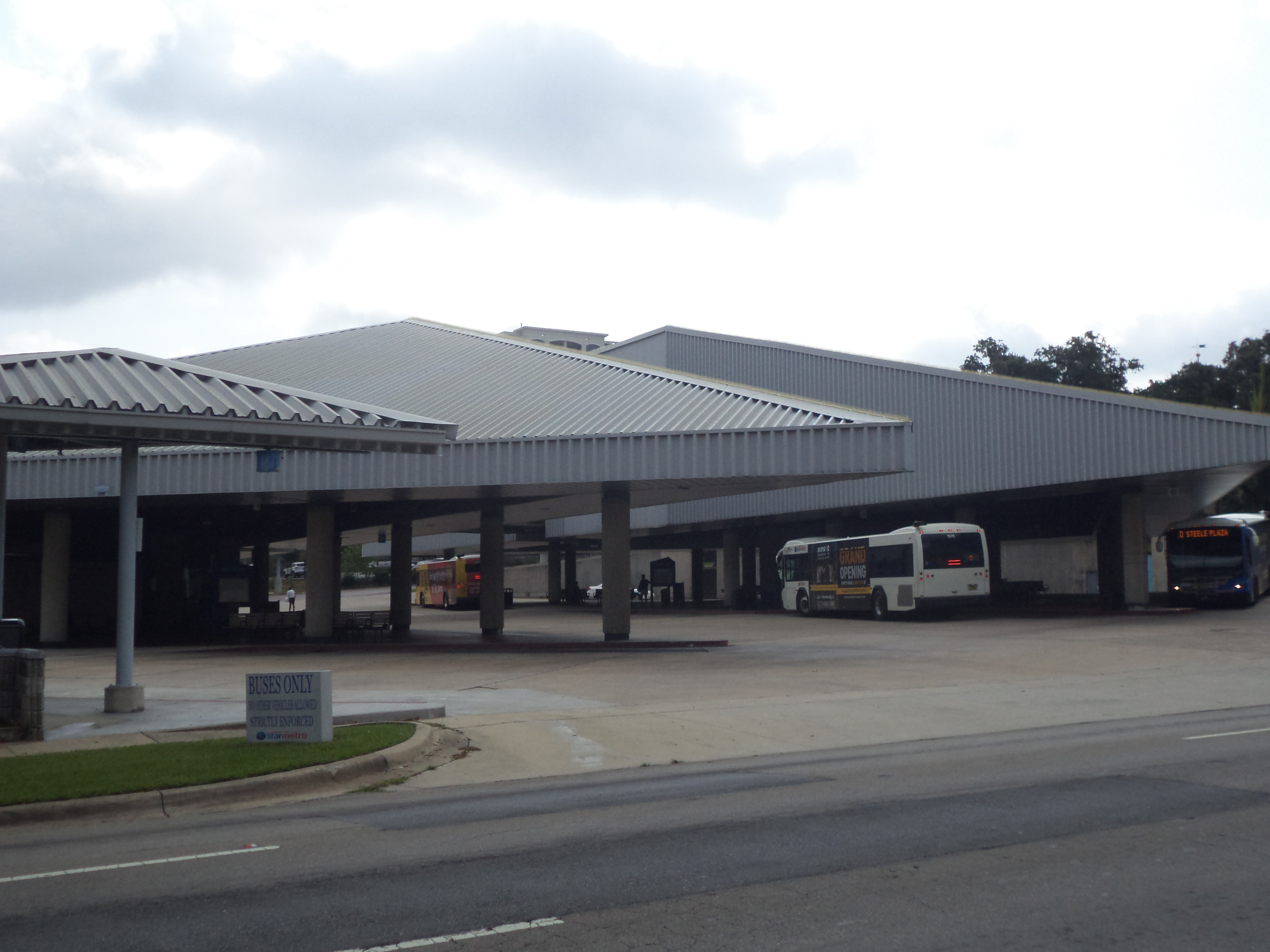
Tallahassee's central bus station is named after Steele.

In 1983, Tallahassee created a new bus terminal, chose to name it after Steele, and placed a statue of him at the terminal as well.

Bethel Baptist Church in Tallahassee, where Steele served as the pastor for 28 years, founded a school in his and former Governor Leroy Collins' honor: the Steele-Collins Charter School.

Steele was also added to the Florida Civil Rights Hall of Fame in 2012.

At 66, Steele died from bone marrow cancer.
