= William Nichol (mayor) =

American politician

- Born: February 12, 1800; Abingdon, Virginia, U.S.
- Died: November 23, 1878 (aged 78); Nashville, Tennessee, U.S.
- Resting place: Mount Olivet Cemetery
- Occupations: Banker, planter, politician
- Political party: Whig
- Parent(s): Josiah Nichol; Eleanor (Ryburn) Nichol.

William Nichol (1800–1878) was an American banker, Whig politician and planter. He served as the mayor of Nashville, Tennessee, from 1835 to 1837.

== Early life ==
He was born on February 12, 1800, in Abingdon, Virginia. His father was Josiah Nichol, an immigrant from Ireland, and his mother, Eleanor (Ryburn) Nichol. They moved to Nashville when he was still a young boy.

== Career ==
He served as the first President of the Bank of Tennessee. From 1835 to 1837, he served as Mayor of Nashville. Later, he was a planter in Davidson County, Tennessee and Arkansas.

== Personal life ==
He married Julia Margaret Lytle on 6 October 1825. His father-in-law, William Lytle, was a wealthy landowner who had served as captain in the American Revolutionary War. They had four sons, Josiah II, William Lytle, Charles Alexander James Edgar and Harry D., and six daughters, Eleanor Ryburn, Margaret, Ann Lytle, Julia, Jane F. and Lizzie B. Nichol. They resided at Belair, a historic mansion in Nashville from 1835 to his death.

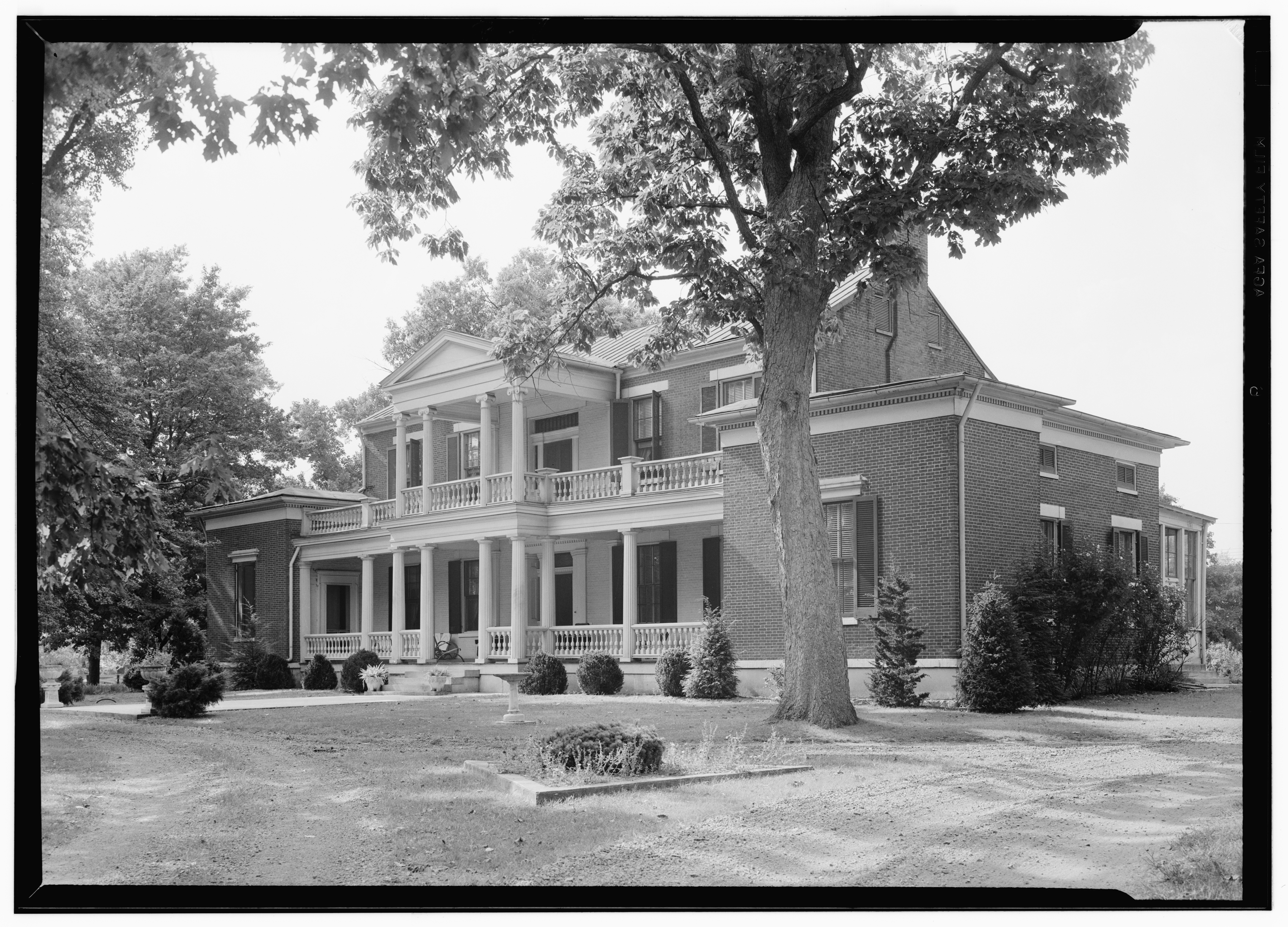
Belle Air at 2250 Lebanon Road, Nashville

== Death ==
He died on November 23, 1878, and he is buried in the Mount Olivet Cemetery. His wife died in 1890.

== Legacy ==
His granddaughter (Harry's daughter), Julia Nichol Sharpe (1875–1931), was married to William Percy Sharpe, who served as Mayor of Nashville from 1922 to 1924.
