= Charles H. Pearce =

African-American politician

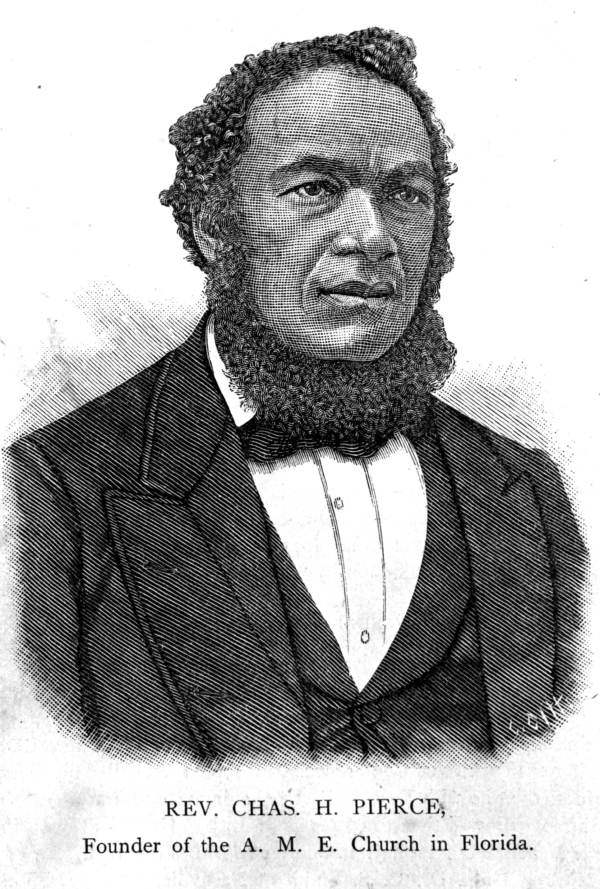

Member of the Florida Senate from the 8th district
- In office 1870–1884

Personal details
- Born: 1817 Maryland
- Died: 1887 (aged 69–70)
- Party: Republican

Charles H. Pearce (1817–1887) was a religious and political leader in Florida. An African Methodist Episcopal (AME) minister, he was dispatched to Florida in 1865, after the American Civil War. He had previously been a missionary in Canada after moving from Maryland to Connecticut. He helped bring the AME Church, the first independent black denomination in the United States, to Florida and worked to build its congregation during and after the Reconstruction era. In 1868 Pearce was elected as a delegate to the Florida Constitutional Convention of 1868. Later that year he was elected to the state legislature as a state senator from Leon County, Florida. He served numerous terms in the legislature, working to gain support for civil rights and public education for Floridians.

Pearce was born into slavery in Maryland and bought his freedom then moved North to New Haven, Connecticut, where he was ordained, and later to Canada, where he served as a preacher and became a British citizen.

== Early life, education and career as minister ==
Pearce was born into slavery in 1817 in Queen Anne's County, Maryland. As a young man, he purchased his freedom by saving his portion of earnings from being "hired out." He moved to New Haven, Connecticut, where he studied and was ordained as a minister in the African Methodist Episcopal (AME) Church. Founded in 1816 by free blacks in Philadelphia, Pennsylvania, this was the first independent black denomination in the United States.

Pearce later moved to Canada and became a British citizen, as it was still a colony. An estimated 20,000 to 30,000 refugee African Americans from the United States had settled there to gain freedom from slavery. He preached there until 1865.

== AME missionary to the South ==
In 1865, after the Civil War, Pearce moved to Florida as an AME missionary. Based in the North, the church sent numerous missionaries to the South to aid the freedmen and plant new churches. Pearce settled in the state capital Tallahassee in Leon County, Florida.

== Political career ==
Pearce said, "A man in this State, cannot do his whole duty as a minister except he looks out for the political interests of his people." Pearce became a prominent black officeholder in the Reconstruction era, a time when threats and white animosity to freedmen was high. White insurgents formed paramilitary groups including the KKK to disrupt elections, intimidate black voters, and assassinate Republican Party leaders in an effort to restore white supremacy.

While helping establish new congregations of the AME Church, Pearce also joined the Republican Party and built political power through these networks. Most freedmen joined the Republicans. Pearce was elected to the Constitutional Convention of 1868 of Florida. He was expelled by moderate Republicans because of his British citizenship.

Later in 1868, Pearce was elected as a Republican to the Florida Senate, serving one term until 1870 when he was re-elected despite a factional Republican Party challenge from Baptist and more conservative James Page. He was elected again in 1872, and served to 1884. In this period, during the Reconstruction Era, he was considered the political boss of Leon County, Florida, where the freedmen constituted the majority of the population. Pearce was influential in his support (and, in some cases, opposition to others seeking office or in office).

Pearce also helped establish educational institutions, including the predecessor to what became Edward Waters College in Jacksonville, Florida, which was affiliated with the AME Church. He also gained state legislative support of education for all Floridians.

In an act of political payback, in November 1876 Pearce was challenged and disqualified as an elector for the Republican Rutherford B. Hayes and William Wheeler ticket, at the time that votes for electors were still being tallied from various counties. He had been convicted by a circuit court in 1870 of a felony for offering a bribe. Although he was pardoned on April 29, 1872, by Acting Governor Samuel T. Day and E. M. Randall, Chief Justice of the Supreme Court, as certified in December 1876 by the Secretary of State in Florida, votes cast for him in the presidential election were not accepted. His opponents noted there was no provision under Florida law to allow a convicted felon, even though pardoned, to regain his right to vote or serve as an elector. Through the waning years of Reconstruction, white conservative Democrats made other efforts to dispute and prevent the seating of black electors, or voting by blacks for other Republican candidates, and there was considerable violence and intimidation at the elections.

Pearce also had rivals within the AME church and among the leaders of the black Baptist Church in Florida. Many of the latter had quickly established independence with their congregations after the war from the white-dominated Southern Baptist Church.

== See also ==
- African American officeholders from the end of the Civil War until before 1900
