= James Page (minister) =

African-American minister

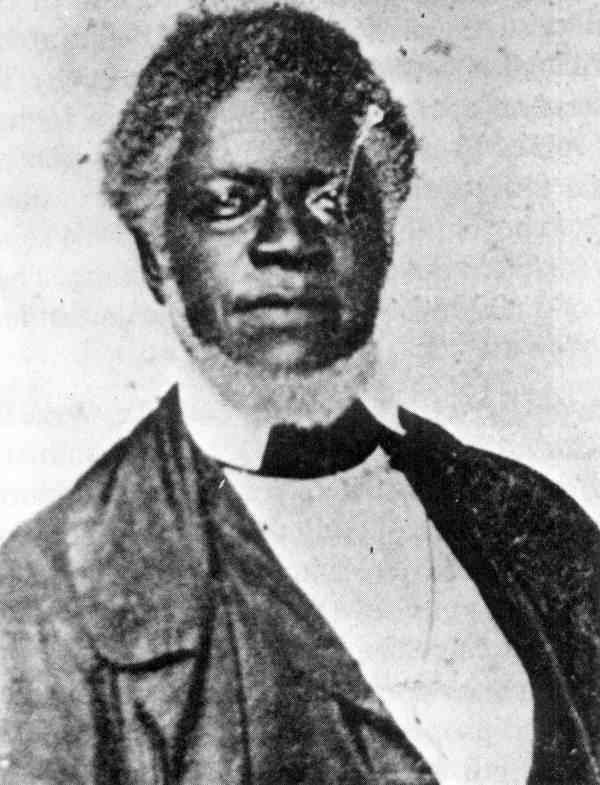
James Page

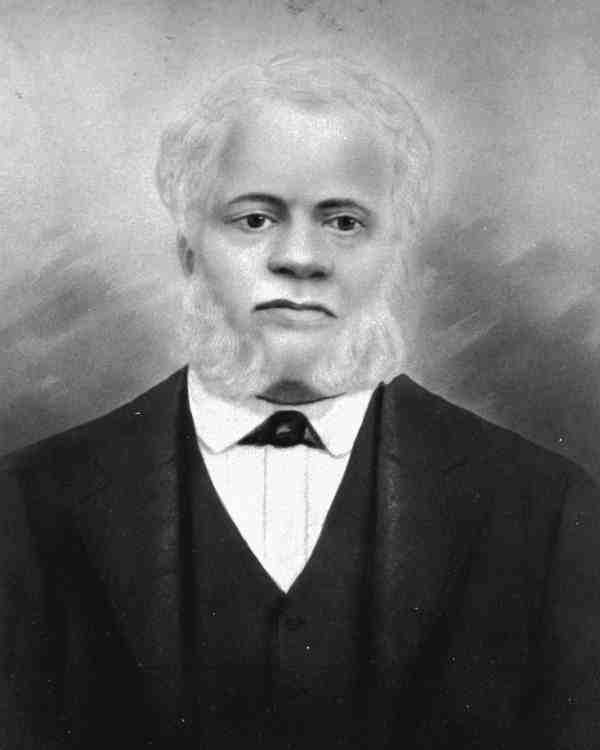
James Page later in life

James Page (1808 – March 14, 1883), was an African-American minister and political leader.

== History ==
James Page was born enslaved in Richmond, Virginia in 1808. About 1838 John Parkhill transported James and his wife to Leon County, Florida. Colonel John H. Parkhill owned a cotton plantation in Bel Air. Page was enslaved as a gardener, carriage driver, as well as a body servant. Parkhill influenced Page to take up the ministry and in 1851 at Newport, Florida, a Baptist minister ordained James Page as Florida's first and only African-American minister at that time. After Minister Pages' ordination, John Parkhill gave him land for the Bethlehem Missionary Baptist Church of Belair, Florida, the first regularly organized (in the white tradition) Black church in Florida.

From 1865 and 1870, Reverend Page organized the Bethel Baptist Church in Tallahassee, Florida. Reverend Page's life was a superb example of how slaveholders never ceased their exploitation. They demanded slaves adhere to their brand of Christian religion. Enslaved people were explicitly taught it was God's will for them, while on earth, to suffer, to labor ceaselessly and obey their masters, for an eternal reward in Heaven. Slaveholders found that Black people typically responded more favorably to Black preachers, and Page was a passionate speaker. At least outwardly, Page subscribed to this teaching and acknowledged Blacks as inferior and subservient to whites. As thanks for his proselytizing to hundreds of enslaved people, he was rewarded by whites for his humble docility.

== Politics ==
Page served as a Leon County delegate to the Republican Convention in 1867. He was also a Leon County commissioner from 1869 to 1870 and legislative chaplain of the Florida Senate from 1868 to 1870. In 1870 he ran unsuccessfully for State Senate, but returned to public office in 1872 when Governor Ossian Hart appointed him as Leon County's Justice of the Peace.

Reverend James Page died March 14, 1883. His Great Floridian plaque is located at the Bethlehem Missionary Baptist Church, 3945 Museum Drive, Tallahassee.
