= Tallahassee bus boycott =

Political and social protest campaign in 1956

- Part of the civil rights movement
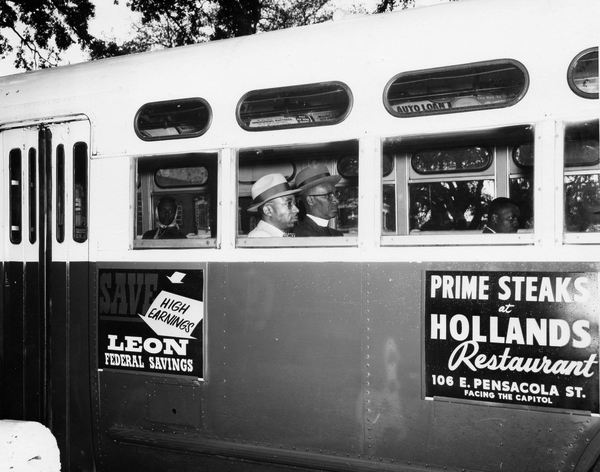
- Reverends C. K. Steele, H. McNeal Harris, and A. C. Redd ride at the front of a bus on December 27, 1956
- Date: May 28, 1956 – December 22, 1956
- Location: Tallahassee, Florida
- Caused by: Racial segregation on public transportation; College students Wilhemina Jakes and Carrie Patterson arrested; Influence of on-going Montgomery bus boycott; Browder v. Gayle (1956)
- Result: Race-based segregation on Tallahassee city buses abolished

Parties
Inter-Civic Council (ICC); National Association for the Advancement of Colored People (NAACP)	City Commission of Tallahassee; Florida Legislative Investigation Committee (FLIC); Cities Transit Company; Tallahassee Police Department

Lead figures
ICC member: Charles K. Steele; NAACP member: Robert W. Saunders Sr.	

The Tallahassee bus boycott was a political and social protest campaign against the policy of racial segregation on the public transit system of Tallahassee, Florida. The campaign lasted from May 26, 1956, to December 22, 1956, and contributed to the broader civil rights movement in the United States. The boycott began when Wilhelmina Jakes and Carrie Patterson, two Florida A&M University students, were arrested by the Tallahassee Police Department for "placing themselves in a position to incite a riot". Robert Saunders, representing the NAACP, and Rev. C. K. Steele began talks with city authorities while the local Black community started boycotting the city's buses. The Inter-Civic Council ended the boycott on December 22, 1956. On January 7, 1957, the City Commission repealed the bus-franchise segregation clause because of the United States Supreme Court ruling Browder v. Gayle (1956).

== History ==
Jakes and Patterson, roommates at Florida A&M University, stepped onto the city bus and sat in the only available seats, ones located next to a white woman behind the Cities Transit bus driver, Max Coggins. They refused to move when Coggins told the women they could not sit there. The bus driver drove to the closest service station and demanded all passengers remain seated until the police arrived. Jakes and Patterson were charged with placing themselves in a position to incite a riot. Later that day, the students were bailed out by the dean of students. The day after the incident, the Ku Klux Klan burned a cross in front of the women's residence. News of the cross-burning quickly spread throughout the campus, and Student Government Association officers, led by Broades Hartley, called for a meeting of the student body. The incidents (the cross-burning and the arrest) were discussed in the meeting. Student leaders called for the withdrawal of student support of the bus company and for students to seek participation in the boycott throughout the community.

=== Organization and Leadership ===
After the student body meeting, Reverend C.K. Steele, a member of the Tallahassee Interdenominational Ministerial Alliance (IMA) and leader in the NAACP, organized a mass meeting where approximately 450 attended. In the meeting, the Inter-Civic Council (ICC) was born from the joining of the NAACP, IMA, and Tallahassee Civic League. The ICC was formed in response to community fear that an NAACP-led protest would be met with state repression.

The organization devised a list of demands to offer to the city and the bus company: (1) seating on the buses would be on a first-come, first-served basis; (2) Black people were to be courteously treated by white drivers; (3) Black people were to be hired to drive the predominantly black bus routes.

Its leaders held weekly meetings and the council was highly active in Civil Rights-related activism. The organization voted to form a carpool system to provide transportation for Black maids, who were most of the city bus lines' clientele.

The NAACP became involved after the boycott had been started, sending a lawyer to defend drivers of boycotters (carpool drivers) who were arrested for driving unlicensed "for hire" vehicles. The national NAACP also sent the ICC $1,500, its first donation immediately after the boycott began. The bus boycott was heavily influenced by the ongoing boycott in Montgomery. The ICC was modeled after the Montgomery Improvement Association (MIA). To help boycotters in Tallahassee, the MIA sent the ICC a cash donation. King himself came to the city to offer support and counsel. Due to the hostile environment in Tallahassee, King was escorted in and out of C.K. Steele's church in secrecy to avoid fueling white accusations that outside agitators had masterminded the boycott.

While the ICC has no women officers or spokespersons, Gladys Harrington was its secretary. Daisy Young provided clerical services for the ICC and served as a link between the FAMU campus and the boycott leaders. Young was a key figure in the Office of Admissions and Records at Florida A&M University, and helped start a CORE chapter on FAMU's campus.

=== Opposition ===
During the boycott, police officers tracked black people to ICC meetings and took down the license tag numbers of parked cars. Local white people hurled rocks through the windows of parked vehicles and yelled threats of violence over phones in the middle of the night. Blasts from a shotgun destroyed the windows of Dan Speed's grocery store, as he was involved in the ICC. By late July 1956, the police hired an informant to attend ICC mass meetings and report on the organization's activities.

=== Resolution ===
On November 13, 1956, the U.S. Supreme Court corroborated the lower court's decision and declared that Alabama's state and local laws requiring segregation on buses were unconstitutional through Browder v. Gayle. Leaders of the Inter-Civic Council faced uncertainty about their next steps. During the first week of December, C.K. Steele traveled to Montgomery to attend the "Institute on Nonviolence and Social Change," called in part by Martin Luther King Jr. to prepare Black citizens of Montgomery for riding on integrated buses.

On December 23, 1956, the ICC voted to end the seven-month boycott. That night, the ICC passed out instructions on how to conduct the move back to the buses. On December 24, 1956, leaders of the ICC boarded buses across Tallahassee. Leaders such as Dan Speed were asked to move to the back of the bus, but others such as Steele rode without hassle. The sight of Black passengers riding in the front of buses angered city commissioners, who responded by suspending the bus company's operations. However, federal judge DeVane issued a temporary restraining order, Ordinance 741, to keep the buses running until the case could be settled in court. The ICC had planned for its leaders to board every available bus that day, but they were forced to cancel this demonstration due to the presence of approximately 200 armed white individuals waiting at the bus stops.

== Aftermath ==
On New Year's Eve, the Leon County White Citizens Council passed a resolution asking Governor Collins to use his emergency powers to take control of the buses. That same evening, bricks were thrown onto the porch of the Steele home by white youth who fled in a waiting car. In response, Governor Collins suspended all bus services in Tallahassee on January 1, 1957. On January 2, 1957, a cross was burned in front of Steele's home while he was attending an ICC meeting.

On January 7, 1957, the Tallahassee City Commission repealed the bus-franchise segregation clause due to its questionable legal standing. However, they immediately passed Ordinance 741, which allowed bus drivers to assign passengers to specific seats, effectively maintaining segregation practices. Many Black residents in Tallahassee continued to unofficially boycott the buses in protest of this new policy.

On January 19, 1957, six students—three white students from Florida State University and three Black students from Florida A&M University—deliberately challenged Ordinance 741 by violating the seating arrangements. As a result, three of the students were arrested and subsequently spent 15 days in jail for their act of civil disobedience.

Despite these efforts, buses in Tallahassee were not fully integrated until the summer of 1957. Members of the Tallahassee CORE chapter would test the success of the bus boycott in the fall of 1957. Patricia Stephens Due and the other CORE leaders found that the bus boycott did create change, but there were still Black riders fearful of sitting in the front of the bus.

== Analysis ==
Sociologist Lewis Killian points out that organizational and community leaders did not gather until after the initiation of the boycott, which highlights the spontaneity of the student-initiated boycott. Furthermore, the boycott was initiated during a time in which Tallahassee's civil rights-related organizational activity was markedly low and the black community in Tallahassee was unprepared for a protest as large as the boycott.

The creation of the ICC provides an example of the emergence of new norms and structures. Although it is widely believed that the centers of Civil Rights Movement activity were organizational and structural bodies such as the black church and the NAACP, a new normative structure emerged in the Tallahassee Bus Boycott.

The boycott presents an overlooked departure from the circumstances of the Montgomery bus boycott, which was planned and precipitated by active individuals and organizations; in addition, the Tallahassee boycott, at least in its initial stages, was separate from and did not model the latter.

Killian finds the formation of the ICC and the spontaneous and irregular nature of the boycott's initiation commensurate with traditional collective behavior theory, which includes such superficially irrational elements as spontaneity.

== Participants ==
- Wilhelmina Jakes
- Carrie Patterson
- C.K. Steele
- Daisy Young
- Robert Saunders
- James Hudson
- King Solomon Dupont
- David Brooks
- Metz Rollins
- Dan B. Speed
- Elbert W. Jones
- Eddie Barrington
- M. C. Williams
- Broadus Hartley

== See also ==
- History of Tallahassee, Florida § Black history
