= Bel Aire (Charlottesville, Virginia) =

Historic house in Virginia, United States

- U.S. National Register of Historic Places
- Virginia Landmarks Register
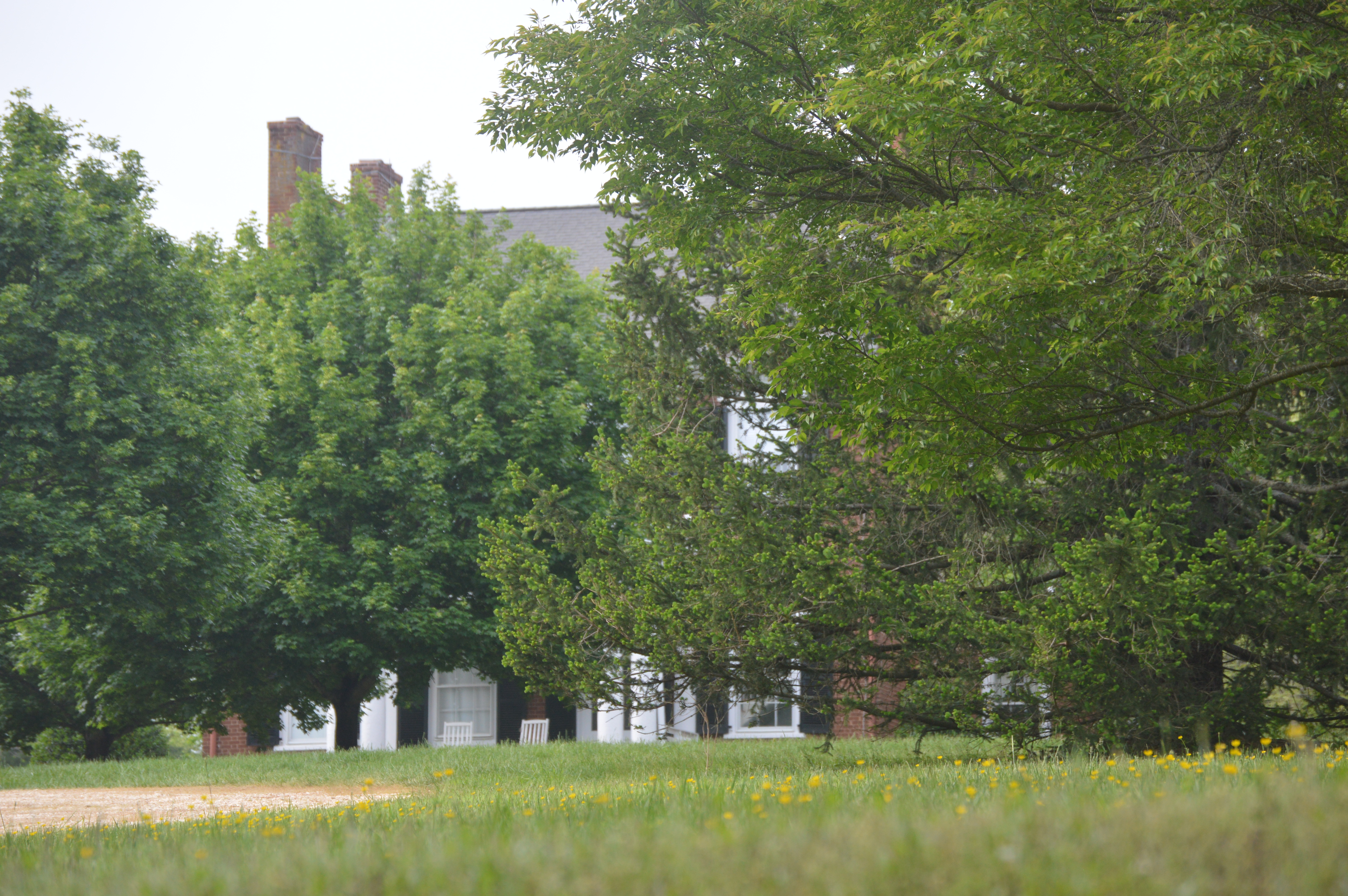
- Front of the house

- Location within Virginia Location within the United States
- Location: 4710 Dickerson Rd., near Charlottesville, Virginia
- Coordinates: 38°09′46″N 78°25′30″W
- Area: 15.4 acres (6.2 ha)
- Built: c. 1825
- Architectural style: Federal
- NRHP reference No.: 07000132
- VLR No.: 002-0001

Significant dates
- Added to NRHP: March 7, 2007
- Designated VLR: December 6, 2006

Bel Aire is a historic home and farm located near Charlottesville, Albemarle County, Virginia. It was built about 1825, and is a 2 1/2-story, four bay brick double-pile dwelling in the Federal style. It features an original flat-roof portico and side gable roof. It has a shed-roof addition dating to about 1860 or 1870, and a one-story sunroom addition, dated to about 1980. Also on the property are a contributing chicken coop, corn crib, garage, and family cemetery. The property is associated with the prominent Virginia Michie family and documented as James H. Michie, owner.

It was added to the National Register of Historic Places in 2007.
