= Bel Air Circuit =

Movie distribution service

The Bel Air Circuit, more recently known as the Bel Air Digital Circuit, is an exclusive movie distribution service provided by the main Hollywood studios, offered to a group of movie executives, actors, as well as other wealthy individuals, in and around the greater Los Angeles area.

Named after the affluent area of Bel Air in the city of Los Angeles, where a large number of movie executives live, this Hollywood institution has a long history. It was originally set-up by movie moguls, including Louis B. Mayer and Daryl Zanuck, to allow them to view and critique new releases in the comfort and privacy of their own homes, but was later expanded into an invite-only exclusive service for wealthy patrons who could not go to regular cinemas for whatever reason, or who could simply afford their own home theatres, so chose to view movies this way.

Several of Hollywood's A-listers are known to be on one or more of the various studio lists, including actors Tom Cruise, Ben Affleck, Sharon Stone, and Sylvester Stallone; film directors Steven Spielberg, Woody Allen, David Lynch, and Quentin Tarantino; producers Peter Guber, Lorenzo di Bonaventura, and Joel Silver; studio executives and investors Peter Chernin, Harvey Weinstein, Tom Rothman, Brett Ratner, and Stephen Schwarzman; and others both inside and outside the entertainment industry like Lionel Richie, Rupert Murdoch, Barry Manilow, and Prince Saud al-Faisal.
