= Sweet Kitty Bellairs =

Sweet Kitty Bellairs may refer to:

- Sweet Kitty Bellairs (play), a 1903 play by David Belasco that is based on Agnes and Egerton Castle's 1900 novel The Bath Comedy
- Sweet Kitty Bellairs (1916 film), a 1916 film based on Belasco's play and the novel The Bath Comedy
- Sweet Kitty Bellairs (1930 film), a 1930 musical film based on Belasco's play and the novel The Bath Comedy
