= Bel Air =

Bel Air or Bel-Air may refer to:

== Places ==
=== France ===
- Bastide Bel-Air, a historic, listed building in Aix-en-Provence, France
- Bel-Air station (Paris Metro), a station of the Paris Metro

=== Haiti ===
- Bel Air, Haiti, a neighborhood of Port-au-Prince

=== United States ===
- Bel Air, Los Angeles, a neighborhood of the city of Los Angeles, California
  - Hotel Bel-Air, a hotel located in Bel-Air, Los Angeles, California
- Bel Air, Allegany County, Maryland, an unincorporated place in Maryland
- Bel Air, Harford County, Maryland, town and county seat in Maryland
- Bel Air (Minnieville, Virginia), a historic plantation in Prince William County, Virginia
- Bel Air, Minot, a neighborhood in Minot, North Dakota
- Bel-Air (Sanford), a neighborhood of the city of Sanford, Florida

=== Other places ===
- Bel Air, Seychelles
- Bel-Air, residential development of Cyberport business park, Hong Kong
- Bel-Air, Makati, a gated community in the Philippines
- Place de Bel-Air (Genève), a plaza and major public transportation intersection in Geneva, Switzerland; see Trolleybuses in Geneva

== Brands and companies ==
- Bel-Air Athletics, a clothing brand founded by Will Smith
- Bel Air Circuit, an exclusive home movie club
- Chevrolet Bel Air, a car
- Bel Air Markets, a trading name for the Raley's Supermarkets chain in the western US

== Media and entertainment ==
- Bel Air (album) (2011), by Guano Apes
- "Bel Air (Kūhaku no Shunkan no Naka de)", song by Malice Mizer
- "Bel Air" (Lana Del Rey song), 2012
- "Bel Air" (Katseye song), 2026
- "Bel Air", song by Katseye from their extended play album Wild
- "Bel-Air", song by Australian band the Church, on the album Of Skins and Heart
- "Bel Air", song by the German band Can, on the album Future Days
- Bel-Air (film), a 2019 short film based on the 1990s sitcom The Fresh Prince of Bel-Air
  - Bel-Air (TV series), a reboot of the 1990s sitcom The Fresh Prince of Bel-Air
- Bel Air (sometimes Bel-Air), a French record label in existence 1956–64/65; Paul Mauriat

== Schools ==
- Bel Air High School (El Paso, Texas)
- Bel Air High School (Harford County, Maryland)

== See also ==
- Belleair, Florida
- Bel-Aire (disambiguation)
- Belair (disambiguation)
- Bellaire (disambiguation)
