= George Bellairs =

British crime author (1902–1982)

- Born: Harold Blundell; 1902; Heywood, UK
- Died: April 1982 (aged 79); Isle of Man
- Occupations: Bank manager, author, detective fiction writer
- Known for: The Inspector Littlejohn series.
- Spouse: Gwladys (Gladys) Mabel Roberts (m. 1930)
- Website: https://www.georgebellairs.com

George Bellairs was the nom de plume of Harold Blundell (1902–1982), a crime writer and bank manager born in Heywood, near Rochdale, Lancashire. He began working for Martins Bank at the age of 15, and stayed there in escalating roles of seniority until his retirement. He then settled in the Isle of Man.

He wrote more than 50 books, most featuring the detective Inspector Thomas Littlejohn, and all with the same publisher. His radio comedy The Legacy was aired in 1951. He also wrote four novels under the alternative pseudonym Hilary Landon. His first novel, Littlejohn on Leave, was published in 1941 and his last one, An Old Man Dies, was published close to his death in 1982. He also contributed articles to the Manchester Guardian and to Manx publications such as Manx Life and received a short review in the print edition of The Spectator in 1958 for his book Corpse at the Carnival. Many of his books were also published by the Thriller Book Club, and several titles have recently been issued in the British Library Crime Classics series.

Harold Blundell served on the boards of The United Manchester Hospitals and Manchester Royal Infirmary. He married Gladys Mabel Roberts in 1930. She presented his personal papers to the John Rylands Library at the University of Manchester, England.

Blundell died on the Isle of Man in April 1982 just before his eightieth birthday after a protracted illness.

== Bibliography ==
=== Written as George Bellairs ===
==== Inspector Thomas Littlejohn novels ====
- Littlejohn on Leave (1941)
- The Four Unfaithful Servants (1942)
- Death of a Busybody (1942)
- The Dead Shall Be Raised (1942) aka Murder Will Speak (1942)
- The Murder of a Quack (1943)
- The Case of the Seven Whistlers (1944)
- Death in the Night Watches (1945)
- He'd Rather Be Dead (1945)
- Calamity at Harwood (1945)
- The Case of the Scared Rabbits (1946)
- The Crime at Halfpenny Bridge (1946)
- Death on the Last Train (1948)
- Outrage on Gallows Hill (1948)
- The Case of the Demented Spiv (1949)
- The Case of the Famished Parson (1949)
- The Case of the Headless Jesuit (1950) aka Death Brings in the New Year
- Crime in Lepers’ Hollow (1950)
- Dead March for Penelope Blow (1951) aka Dead March for Penelope
- Death in Dark Glasses (1952)
- Half-Mast for the Deemster (1953)
- A Knife for Harry Dodd (1953)
- The Cursing Stones Murder (1954)
- Death in Room Five (1955)
- Death Drops the Pilot (1956)
- Death Treads Softly (1956)
- Death in High Provence (1957)
- Death Sends for the Doctor (1957)
- Corpse at the Carnival (1958)
- Murder Makes Mistakes (1958)
- Bones in the Wilderness (1959)
- Toll the Bell for Murder (1959)
- Corpses in Enderby (1960)
- Death in the Fearful Night (1960)
- The Body in the Dumb River (1961) aka Murder Masquerade
- Death of a Tin God (1961)
- Death Before Breakfast (1962)
- The Tormentors (1962)
- Death in the Wasteland (1964)
- Death of a Shadow (1964)
- Surfeit of Suspects (1964)
- Death Spins the Wheel (1965)
- Intruder in the Dark (1966)
- Strangers Among the Dead (1966)
- Death in Desolation (1967)
- Single Ticket to Death (1967)
- Fatal Alibi (1968)
- Murder Gone Mad (1968)
- The Night They Killed Joss Varran (1970)
- Tycoon’s Death-bed (1970)
- Pomeroy, Deceased (1971)
- Murder Adrift (1972)
- Devious Murder (1973)
- Fear Round About (1975)
- Close All Roads to Sospel (1976) aka All Roads to Sospel
- The Downhill Ride of Leeman Popple (1978)
- An Old Man Dies (1980)

==== Other novels ====
- Turmoil in Zion (1943) aka Death Stops the Frolic

A title that has sometimes mistakenly been attributed to Bellairs is Officer That’s Your Man! (1948). This short story collection was by P G Arbaleister.

=== Written as Hilary Landon ===
- Murder at Morning Prayers (1947)
- Circle Around a Corpse (1948)
- Choose your Own Verdict (1949)
- Exit Sir Toby Belch (1950)
