= Bellaire =

Bellaire may refer to:

== Places ==
=== United States ===
- Bellaire, Arkansas
- Bellaire, Smith County, Kansas
- Bellaire, Michigan
- Bellaire, Minnesota
- Bellaire, Ohio
- Bellaire, location near Elizabethtown, Pennsylvania
- Bellaire, section of Queens Village, Queens, New York
- Bellaire, Texas, city
- Bellaire Boulevard, street in Houston, Texas
- Bellaire station, railroad station that was in Queens, New York
- Lake Bellaire, of the Elk River Chain of Lakes Watershed

=== Other places ===
- Bellaire, Durban, South Africa
- Bellaire, Wallonia, province of Liège, Belgium

== People ==
- Florian Bellaire (born 1985), German politician

== Arts and entertainment ==
- MCRN Bellaire, a fictional warship of the Martian Congressional Republic Navy in the science-fiction novel series The Expanse

== See also ==
- Bel Air (disambiguation) (includes Bel-Air)
- Bel-Aire (disambiguation) (includes Bel Aire)
- Belair (disambiguation)
- Bellair (disambiguation)
- Bellairs, a surname
- Belleair, Florida
