= Belair Development =

Historic site in Maryland

Coordinates: 38°57′45″N 76°44′2″W

Belair Development is an historic site in Prince George's County, Maryland.

It consists of 7 planned communities: Meadowbrook, Tulip Grove, Kenilworth, Somerset, Buckingham, Heather Hills and Foxhill built by Levitt & Sons in what is now Bowie, Maryland, constructed between 1957 and 1965.

In 1961, Levitt and Sons acquired the property that later became Bowie Marketplace. The main shopping center was constructed between 1961 and 1967 and was formerly known as the Belair Shopping Center.

When constructed, Levitt refused to sell homes in the development to blacks while advocating that the United States government take steps to end racial discrimination in housing.

The development takes its name from the Belair Mansion.
