= Robert W. Saunders Sr. =

American civil rights activist (1966–2003)

- Born: June 9, 1921; Tampa, Florida, U.S.
- Died: March 20, 2003 (aged 81)
- Known for: Civil rights activist
- Spouse: Helen Saunders
- Children: 1
- Awards: World War II Victory Medal

Robert W. Saunders Sr. (June 9, 1921 – March 20, 2003) was an African American civil rights activist who served in the NAACP and was its field director for Florida from 1951 until 1966. He participated in the Civil Rights Movement in Florida, where he organized protests against discrimination.

== Early life ==
Robert W. Saunders Sr. was born on June 9, 1921, in West Tampa. He went to Bethune-Cookman University before getting drafted for the army. He served for the Army Air Corps at Tuskegee Air Field, where he achieved a World War II Victory Medal. After his military career, he went to the Detroit Institute of Technology where he earned a Bachelor of Arts. He then attended University of Detroit Law School.

== Political career ==
In January of 1952, he became NAACP's field director for Florida due to Harry T. Moore, the previous director, being killed in a Ku Klux Klan bombing along with his wife. Saunders worked on facilities and housing and equal pay for black teachers, among others.

He left his position in 1966 and became head of the Southeast Regional Civil Rights Section of the Office of Equal Opportunity in Atlanta. After that, he went to work with his friend Roy Wilkins in the Equal Employment Opportunity Commission. He worked there for a decade until 1976, when he returned to Tampa. He directed the Office of Equal Opportunity for the Hillsborough County Board of County Commissioners until his retirement in 1988.

== Family ==
Saunders had a wife named Helen Strickland Saunders, who served as the Secretary of NAACP's Tampa branch from 1964 to 1976 and as the branch president from 1976 to 1981. They had a son named Robert W. Saunders Jr.

== Death and legacy ==
Saunders died in a car accident on March 20, 2003 at 81. On November 5, 2003, a public library was renamed the Robert W. Saunders Sr. Public Library in honor of him.
