= Bel Air (Katseye song) =

"Bel Air" is a song by the girl group Katseye. It was released on August 14, 2026, through Hybe and Geffen Records as the fourth track on their third extended play (EP), Wild. The modern pop track features a unique background, having originally been penned and produced in 2013 by English singer-songwriter Charli XCX, Noonie Bao, and Jarrad Rogers as an outtake for Charli's 2014 sophomore studio album Sucker. Although the early demo remained an unreleased track for over a decade, it was eventually revived and reworked by Katseye. The group's final version includes official songwriting and production contributions from Charli XCX, Bao, Rogers, Stefan Gräslund, Patrik Berger, Martin Stilling, and Kristin Carpenter. Musically, the song represents a stark, quiet contrast to the group's heavily dance-pop driven discography, offering a slower, more vulnerable ballad styled with soft, layered vocals. Lyrically, "Bel Air" focuses on themes of romantic reflection, glamorous escapism, independence, and the allure of a luxurious lifestyle.

== Background and release ==
"Bel Air" was originally conceived and recorded during early 2013 studio sessions by Charli XCX alongside her collaborators Noonie Bao and Jarrad Rogers. Although initially meant for her sophomore studio album Sucker (2014), the song ultimately failed to make the final cut. For over a decade, the demo instead developed a prominent cult following as an unauthorized online leak amongst her fans. Following Katseye's early success and viral reach, the group publicly declared their ambition to eventually collaborate with Charli XCX in January 2026, citing her aesthetics as a major influence on their sound. Later that year, the girl group's management finalized the rights to use the song and officially revived the demo. Their revamped release featured additional musical changes structured by Patrik Berger, Stefan Gräslund, Martin Stilling, and vocal producer Mischke, adding singer Kristin Carpenter as an extra vocal collaborator. A finalized rendition was ultimately introduced to global listeners as part of their highly anticipated EP Wild, which premiered on August 14, 2026.

== Composition and lyrics ==
"Bel Air" represents a stark sonic divergence for the group, emphasizing emotional pacing over their standard dance beats. Capital FM detailed the process behind the track's evolution, offering an analysis of the meaning drawn between Charli XCX's original intentions and Katseye's modern re-writing. According to the publication, the earlier leaked version captured a significantly more despondent, melodramatic tone concerning unrequited attachment; however, Katseye reinvented the messaging to prioritize unapologetic post-breakup empowerment. By reworking lyrics to detail leaving a flawed romantic history behind and intentionally running away to glamorous isolation in Bel Air, the final version instead serves as a cinematic statement on independence and luxurious lifestyle allure.

== Reception ==
Following the official release of the Wild EP, Katseye's cover of "Bel Air" garnered a distinctly mixed array of reviews from music journalists. Reviewing the album for The Guardian, culture critic Erica Russell sharply questioned the decision to execute a thirteen-year-old demo in 2026; Russell criticized the new group approach by asserting that the members' varying singing talents blended poorly "into a sleek but frustratingly symmetrical monovocal" output. The review concluded that their iteration felt heavily lacking, becoming "so languid it sounds more like a raw demo than the original."

Conversely, positive appraisals viewed the ballad as a powerful shift within Katseye's otherwise upbeat catalog. Analyzing the lyrical exploration of heartbreak, the review affirmed that the moody slowburn "definitely lingers after the EP ends." Supporting this perspective on Katseye's multifaceted range, Ratings Game Music acknowledged that while the Wild tracklist darted sporadically between dance club, raw, flirtatious pop elements, the unexpected shift on songs like "Bel Air" provided a welcomed variance where "surprisingly, none of it feels out of place."

== Commercial performance ==
Following the release of Wild, "Bel Air" debuted at number 97 on the Official Singles Chart for the week ending August 25, 2026. The track appeared on the tally concurrently alongside two other cuts from the EP—"Animal" and "Hootie Frutti"—which respectively reached numbers 12 and 16 on the chart during the same tracking week.
