= Bel Aire, Tiburon, California =

Bel Aire
- Former unincorporated community District of Tiburon
- Location in California
- Coordinates: 37°54′05″N 122°29′57″W
- Country: United States
- State: California
- County: Marin County
- City: Tiburon
- Elevation: 20 ft (6 m)

Bel Aire is a former unincorporated community, now incorporated in Tiburon in Marin County, California. It lies at an elevation of 20 feet (6 m).
