= Bellair (Virginia) =

Historic house in Virginia, United States

- U.S. National Register of Historic Places
- Virginia Landmarks Register
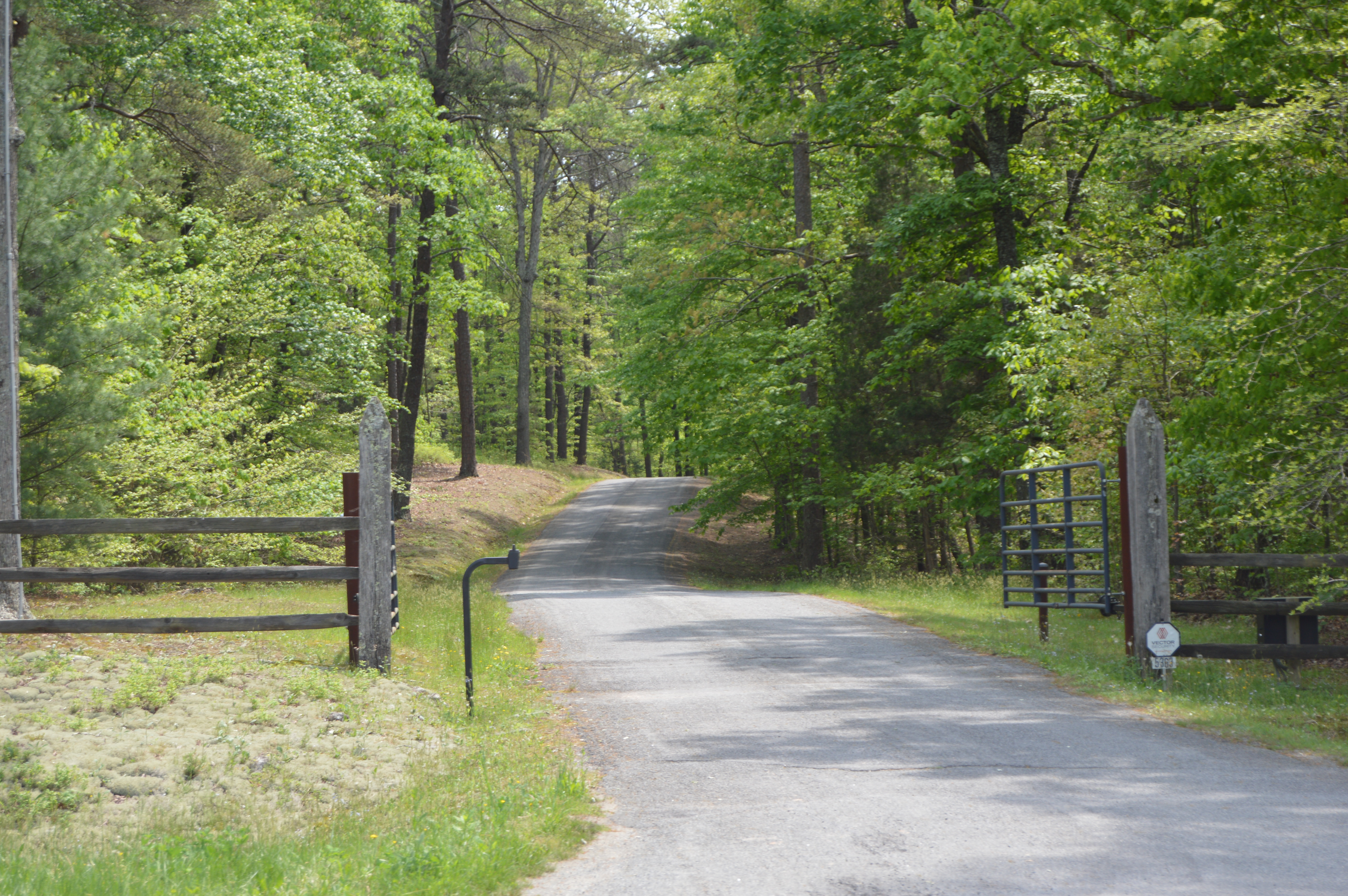
- Entrance to the estate

- Location within Virginia Location within the United States
- Location: County Route 708 south side, 3.8 miles (6.1 km) east of the junction with VA 20, near Charlottesville, Virginia
- Coordinates: 37°53′12″N 78°31′21″W
- Architect: Marshall S. Wells
- Architectural style: Colonial Revival, Federal
- NRHP reference No.: 92001372
- VLR No.: 002-0002

Significant dates
- Added to NRHP: October 15, 1992
- Designated VLR: December 11, 1991

Bellair, in Albemarle County, Virginia, is a historic farm. The farm is significant for the architecture of its buildings and for its association with owners important in the political, religious, and economic life of the state. A 250-acre portion of the farm was listed on the National Register of Historic Places in 1992.

Martin Dawson, owner in 1819, was a co-founder of the Rivanna Navigation Company and eventually became the largest donor to the University of Virginia up to the time of his bequest.

Its southern boundary is the Hardware River.

The main house on the property is a Federal-style building with dual chimneys dating from 1794 to 1817 period.

Architect Marshall S. Wells designed and/or supervised some Colonial Revival style additions in the 1930s and there was further addition of a Palladian window and more in the 1960s.

A smokehouse is one additional contributing building on the property.
