= Belair, South Carolina =

Settlement in South Carolina, United States

Coordinates: 34°57′12″N 80°51′02″W

Belair is an unincorporated community in Lancaster County, in the U.S. state of South Carolina.

== History ==
A post office called Belair was established in 1813, and remained in operation until 1902. According to tradition, the community was named for a bell which hung prominently before a local tavern. A variant name is "Bel Air".
