= Belaire Rosé =

French wine

Belaire Rosé is a French sparkling wine produced in the Provence-Alpes-Côte d'Azur region of the South of France.

Officially labelled "Luc Belaire Rare Rosé," the wine is a blend of Syrah, Grenache, and Cinsault grapes typically used in the production of Provençal rosé wines. The brand is owned by the New York-based company Sovereign Brands. The brand's packaging is noteworthy for its opaque black bottles. Rick Ross is one of their major promoters.

The brand's range also includes a Brut and Luxe, a demi-sec sparkling wine.

Luc Belaire went #1 on Amazon & #23 on iTunes from a song called Luc Belaire (Black Bottle Boy) by Gepetto Jackson Feat. Maybach Music Artist Young Breed
