= Bellair (New Bern, North Carolina) =

Historic house in North Carolina, United States

- U.S. National Register of Historic Places
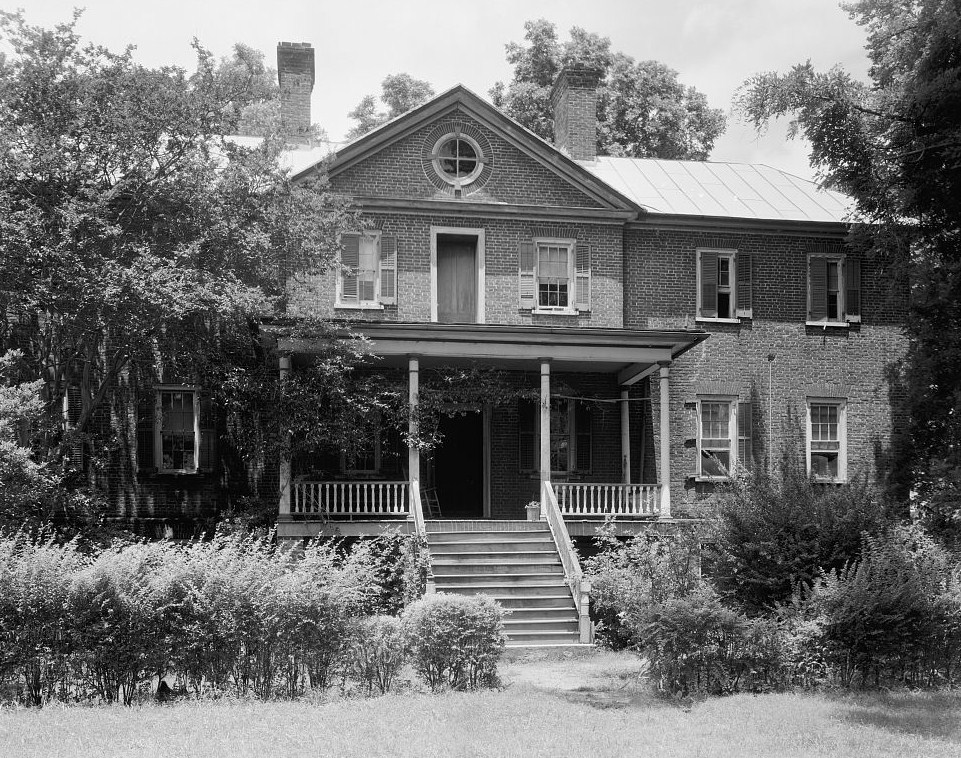
- Bellair Plantation, 1936

- Location within North Carolina Location within the United States
- Location: W of New Bern off SR 1401, near New Bern, North Carolina
- Coordinates: 35°10′50″N 77°7′19″W
- Area: 8 acres (3.2 ha)
- Built: c. 1763
- Architectural style: Georgian
- NRHP reference No.: 72000933
- Added to NRHP: August 25, 1972

Bellair is a historic plantation house located near New Bern, Craven County, North Carolina. It was built about 1792 (verified by dendrochronology), and is a two-story, seven-bay, central hall plan Georgian style brick dwelling. It sits on a high basement and has a three-bay, central projecting pavilion.

It was listed on the National Register of Historic Places in 1972.
