= Bellair, Florida =

- Unincorporated community
- Location within the state of Florida
- Coordinates: 30°10′37.88″N 81°44′30.39″W
- Country: United States
- State: Florida
- County: Clay
- Time zone: UTC-5 (Eastern (EST))
  - Summer (DST): UTC-4 (EDT)
- ZIP codes: 32073
- Area code: 904

Bellair is an unincorporated community in Clay County, Florida, United States. It is a suburb on the southwest side of Jacksonville.
