= Anne Duguël =

Belgian writer (1945–2015)

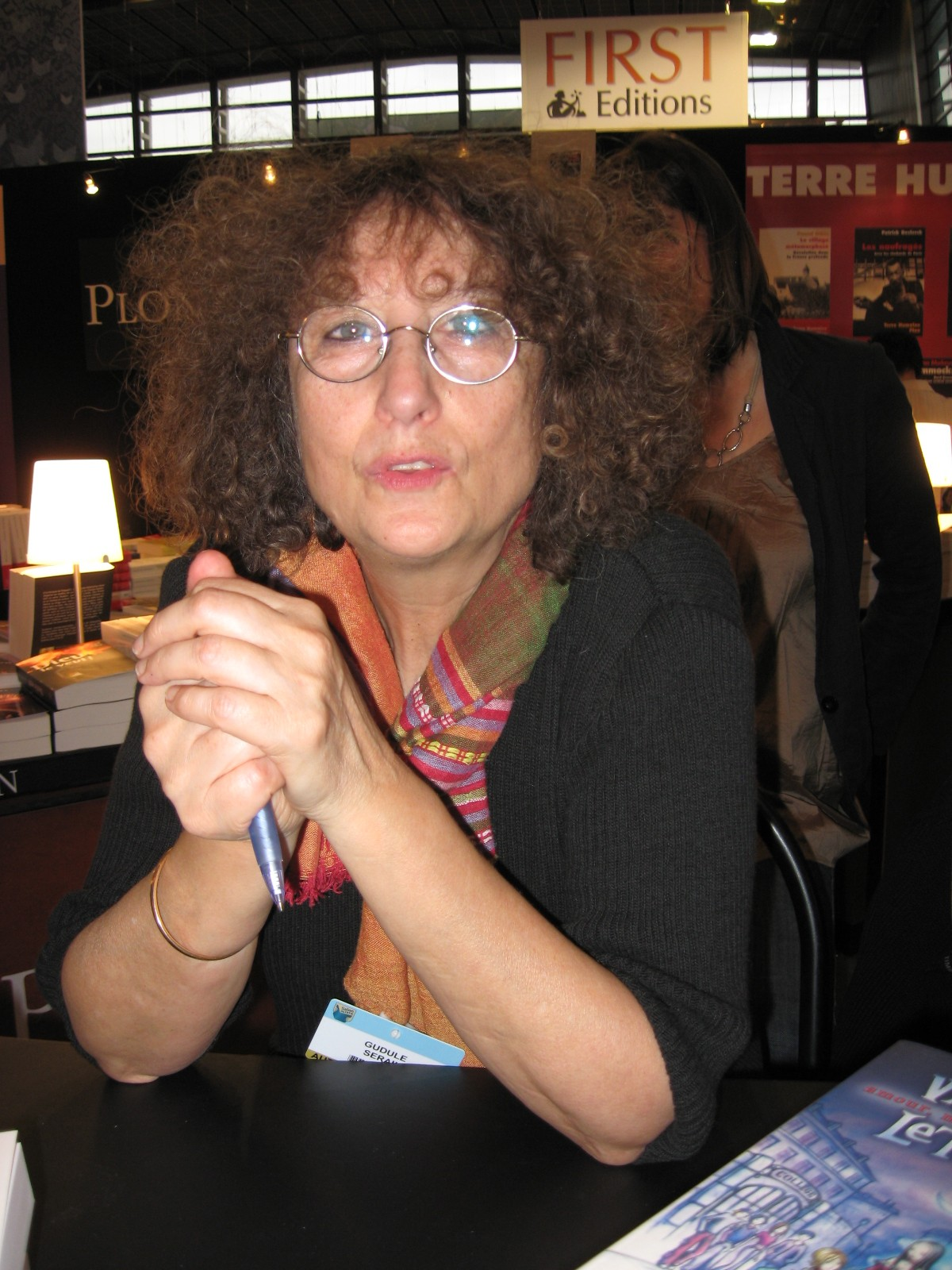
- Born: Anne Liger-Belair; 1 August 1945; Ixelles, Belgium
- Died: 21 May 2015 (aged 69); Puycelsi, France
- Occupation: Author
- Writing career
- Language: French
- Genres: Fantasy, Children's
- Website: gudule.over-blog.com

Anne Duguël is the pen name of Anne Liger-Belair (1 August 1945 – 21 May 2015), a Belgian francophone author. She writes both children's and adult literature, and has also been known to use the pen names Gudule, Anne Guduël, or Anne Carali. Duguël is known for her fantastique works, which were inspired by the dark side of fairytales and writers such as Jean Ray and Michel de Ghelderode.

== Early life ==
Duguël was born in Ixelles, Belgium, the only daughter in a family of boys. According to French newspaper Le Monde, she always wanted to be a writer, finishing her first book at the age of 5. She was raised in a strict Catholic household, Duguël became fascinated with fairytales and dark folk stories. Influenced by Jean Ray, she wrote "Le Couvent maudit" ("The Cursed Convent") in sixth grade. Thirty years later, this story became her novel "L'Ecole qui n'existait pas" ("The School That Didn't Exist").

== Career ==
Duguël studied interior decorating in Brussels before traveling to Lebanon to live with her brother at the age of 19 after a failed romance and the birth of her first child. In Lebanon, she worked as a tailor and journalist. While living there, she met cartoonist Paul Karali, sometimes called Carali, whom she married and had two children with, Olivier and Mélaka. Karali and Duguël left Lebanon for Paris, where she raised their children and continued her work as a journalist, as well as writing comic scenarios for publications such as Charlie Hebdo, Fluide Glacial, and Hara-Kiri. She appeared frequently on French radio program "Radio Libertaire," a show dedicated to comic strips. Duguël also started writing stories for French children's magazines at this time.

Duguël's first book, "Prince Charmant, poil aux dents," was published until 1987. The book was a preview of the fantastique writing style Duguël became known for: Three maids of honor escape a wedding by entering a painting. While there, one of them marries a charming prince who turns out to be a hideous monster. She became a prolific writer, publishing several books a year, exploring topics such as autism, racism, paranoia and homelessness all with a touch of surrealism.

Some of her best-known works include "La Bibliothecaire," the story of a boy who dislikes reading, befriends a mysterious young woman and aids her in her quest to find a magic grimoire; and "Entre chien et louve," the story of an old man who dies and returns to his beloved by inhabiting the body of a dog she adopted.

In 2009, she signed a petition in support of Roman Polanski, calling for his release after Polanski was arrested in Switzerland in relation to his 1977 charge for drugging and raping a 13-year-old girl.

== Death ==
News of Duguël's death broke on 21 May 2015 stunned and saddened the literary community. Her writing, which she described as, "for youth, above all, but for adults a bit as well," is remembered as both creative and emotive, bringing a touch of the bizarre to real-world situations to evoke empathy in the reader.

== Novels ==
- L'École qui n'existait pas (1994)
- La Vie à reculons (1994)
- La Bibliothécaire (1995)
- Après vous, M.de La Fontaine (1995)
- L'Envers du décor (1996)
- La Fille au chien noir (1998)
- J'irai dormir au fond du puits (1998)
- L'Amour en chaussettes (1999)
- Qui hante la tour morte? (1999)
- J'ai 14 ans et je suis détestable (2000)
- Regardez-moi (2001)
- Mon petit frère est un extra-terrestre (2004)
