= Belair (Nashville, Tennessee) =

Historic house in Tennessee, United States

- U.S. National Register of Historic Places
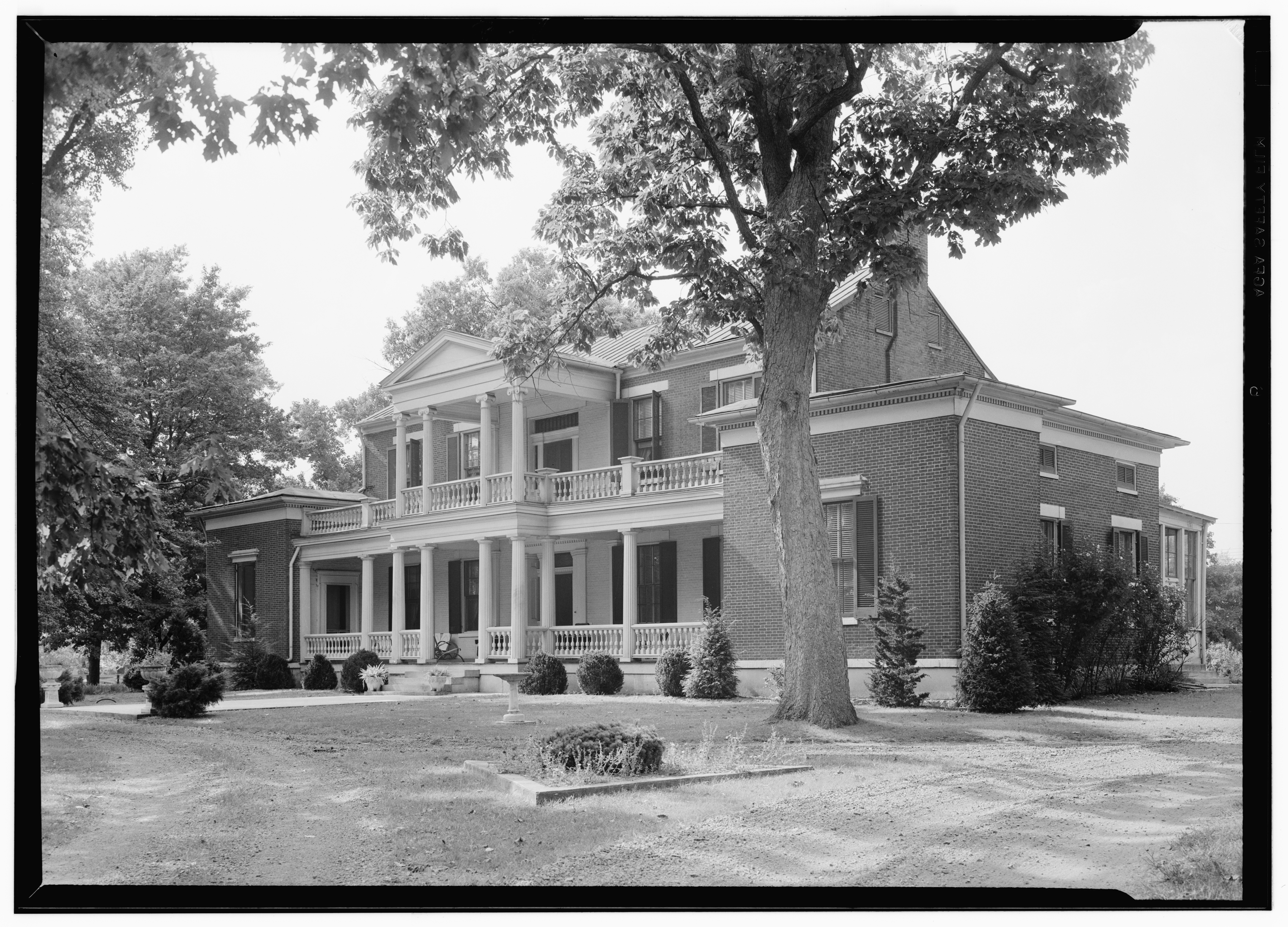
- Belair in 1940

- Location within Tennessee Location within the United States
- Interactive map showing the location of Belair
- Location: 2250 Lebanon Pike, Nashville, Tennessee, U.S.
- Coordinates: 36°10′9″N 86°41′15″W
- Area: 5.98 acres (2.42 ha)
- Built: 1832
- Architectural style: Federal, Classic Revival
- NRHP reference No.: 71000815
- Added to NRHP: May 6, 1971

Belair is a historic mansion in Nashville, Tennessee. Built as a wedding present for Elizabeth Clay, a Southern belle and heiress to the Belle Meade Plantation in the 1830s, it was once the home of William Nichol, a mayor of Nashville.

== Location ==
The mansion is located at 2250 Lebanon Pike in Nashville, the county seat of Davidson County, Tennessee.

== History ==
The mansion was built in 1832 as a wedding present from John Harding, the owner of the Belle Meade Plantation, to his daughter, Elizabeth and her husband, Joseph Clay. It was designed in the Federal architectural style, with pine and ash-tree wood floors.

In 1838, the mansion was purchased by William Nichol, who had served as the mayor of Nashville from 1835 to 1837. He remodeled the house, adding a wing on each side and a winding staircase in the manner of The Hermitage. He also added rosewood doors and silver hardware. Meanwhile, the ceilings are painted with frescoes. When Nichol died in 1878, his widow sold the house.

Other past owners include the R. D. Stanford family of Nashville, and the Chitwood-Smith family. The Chitwood family bought the home in 1948. Attorney Harry H. Chitwood had the home added to the National Register of Historic Places in 1971 and also petitioned the city to save the home from destruction when Briley Parkway was built. The home was sold to H. H. Chitwoods grandson (Smith) in 1994. The home was damaged from nearby blasting when Briley Parkway was widened in 1999.

As of August 2017, the owners planned to turn the house into a bed & breakfast.

== Architectural significance ==
It has been listed on the National Register of Historic Places since May 6, 1971.
