= Bel Air, Florida =

Former historical community in Florida, U.S.

Coordinates: 30°22′49″N 84°16′06″W

Bel Air is an unincorporated community in Leon County, Florida, United States. It is a suburb on the south side of Tallahassee. Bel Air was once a highly developed and wealthy plantation town during the Antebellum South period that eventually grew to be a prominent African American community. Most notably, the site where Reverend James Page, Florida's first ordained Baptist minister, founded the Bethlehem Missionary Baptist Church, "The first organized black church in Florida." Bel Air grew to be a center for economic and cultural growth, attracting numerous businesses such as the St. Marks Railroad and becoming a place for freed slaves to congregate.

== Geography and etymology ==
Located two miles south of downtown Tallahassee, the Bel Air community is situated amongst a dry and sandy ridge, which offers breezes that cause the mosquito population to be in lower numbers. During Bel Air's original settlement in the 1820s, Yellow fever was a prevalent disease that struck towns on the Eastern and Gulf Coasts. New settlers of the Bel Air area believed that the air from the pine trees surrounding the town was a protection from the Yellow Fever. This inspired the settlers to name the land Bel Air, meaning "Beautiful Air" in French.

== History ==
=== Founding ===
Bel Air was originally founded by John H. Parkhill, along with his family and slaves, when they moved from Richmond, Virginia in the 1820s to the developing Leon County area and established the Bel Air cotton plantation. Around this same time, the Panic of 1837 had made the cost of travel to other states expensive. The wealth generated by the plantation and its proximity drew the attention of many other wealthy Tallahasseans to relocate. Other affluent individuals, such as Benjamin Chaires, who may have been the richest man in Florida during the 1830s, also developed their plantations in the Leon County area. In the years predating the American Civil War, Bel Air had become a vibrant town funded by cash crops and slavery.

=== Post-Civil War ===
On May 10, 1865, Union Brigadier General Edward M. McCook arrived in Tallahassee to formally accept the Confederate troops' surrender. Ten days later, on the steps of the Knot House, General McCook read Abraham Lincoln's Emancipation Proclamation, declaring all slaves free in the state. The end of slavery brought an end to the plantation-based economy that supported the wealthy Bel Air population. Newly freed slaves had a fresh start with the Southern Homestead Act of 1866, allowing them to buy up large quantities of farmland. Many new places of worship such as the Bethlehem Missionary Baptist Church were centers of cultural growth, education, and resistance to discrimination. It was through these congregations of the African community that allowed them to fight for their place in society.

=== Modern day ===
Bel Air began to see a decline in the early 20th century as the African American population engaged in a large migration. Thousands left the town to pursue new careers and escape the effects of Jim Crow laws. Along with this, Tallahassee was a growing community that had begun to expand towards the site of Bel Air. In the process of expansion, the lines between the two towns faded as Tallahassee begun to absorb Bel Air. In an effort to immortalize the memory of the once lively settlement, students at Florida A&M University organized the restoration and relocation of the Bethlehem Missionary Baptist Church for their bicentennial project.The church was rebuilt using many of the original planks of wood and is now open for the public to visit at the Tallahassee Museum.

== Cultural impact ==
Huge strides for African American Culture were made in the community of Bel Air. One of the most prominent African Americans in the area was Reverend James Page, once a former slave, who became a political leader that inspired change in Leon County. The development of religious establishments as a binding center for the African American community allowed for tighter unity and the ability to organize in social movements. Their efforts are celebrated today in events such as the Harambee festival and the Soul of the Southside, both dedicated to keeping history alive.

== Links ==
1. Bel Air Community Historical Marker
2. History of Yellow Fever in the U.S.
3. James Page | Florida Baptist Historical Society
4. Emancipatio,n-FINAL-2020.GUIDE_.pdf
5. Tallahassee's Black Churches, 1865–1885
