= Belleair, Florida =

- Town
- Town of Belleair
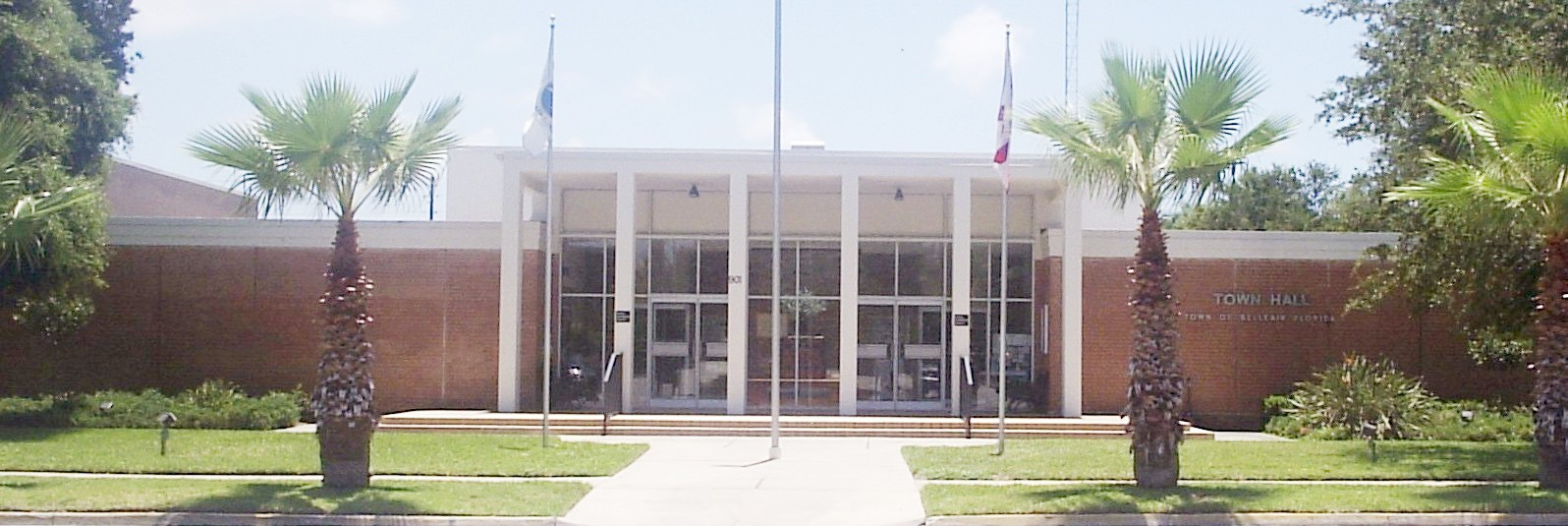
- Belleair Town Hall

- Logo

- Location in Pinellas County and the state of Florida
- Coordinates: 27°56′11″N 82°48′41″W
- Country: United States
- State: Florida
- County: Pinellas
- Settled: 1896
- Incorporated: 1924
- Reincorporated: 1925

Government
  - Type: Commission-Manager
  - Mayor: Michael "Mike" Wilkinson
  - Deputy Mayor: Tom Shelly
  - Commissioners: Thomas Kelly, Todd Jennings, and Patricia Barris
  - Town Manager: Gay Lancaster
  - Town Clerk: Christine Nicole

Area
  - Total: 2.54 sq mi (6.58 km^{2})
  - Land: 1.73 sq mi (4.48 km^{2})
  - Water: 0.81 sq mi (2.10 km^{2})
- Elevation: 36 ft (11 m)

Population (2020)
  - Total: 4,273
  - Density: 2,468.1/sq mi (952.94/km^{2})
- Time zone: UTC-5 (Eastern (EST))
  - Summer (DST): UTC-4 (EDT)
- ZIP code: 33756
- Area code: 727
- FIPS code: 12-05075
- GNIS feature ID: 2405234
- Website: www.townofbelleair.com

Belleair is a town in Pinellas County, Florida, United States. It is part of the Tampa–St. Petersburg–Clearwater Metropolitan Statistical Area, also known as the Tampa Bay area. As of the 2020 census, it had a population of 4,273.

== History ==
Belleair traces its origins to 1896 as a planned resort town with the construction of the Belleview Hotel by railroad tycoon Henry B. Plant. Originally known as Belleair Heights, the community consisted of a few dozen homes, livestock stables, and a famed 200-seat coliseum where bicycle races and political rallies were held. Over 300 acres of land were cleared and streets platted. However, real estate development in the community did not meet expectations, and the population remained small.

The former community of Belleair Heights fizzled out in the mid-20th century as urban sprawl blurred the lines between communities; the area stopped being referred to as Belleair Heights during the 1930s. Following the acquisition of the hotel by the John McEntee Bowman's Biltmore corporation in 1919, management began purchasing large tracts of land south of the resort. The Florida Land Boom was in full swing in 1924, when the company's vice president and hotel manager Earl E. Carley announced a new real estate venture of Belleair Estates.

Belleair Estates was designed by famed landscape architect John Nolen and was intended as Florida's most exclusive winter residential colony. Initially, the Town of Belleair was officially incorporated as a municipality in late 1924, though it was reincorporated in 1925. Development continued until the real estate bubble burst in 1926, which subsequently aided in the national Great Depression three years later. Following World War II, Belleair began to develop in earnest, with over two-thirds of the town's residences built after 1950.

The Eagles Nest Japanese Gardens was a tourist attraction in the town located on the private estate of Dean Alvord. It opened in 1933, and closed in 1952.

== Geography ==
According to the United States Census Bureau, the town has a total area of 2.8 square miles (7.3 km^{2}), of which 1.8 square miles (4.7 km^{2}) is land and 1.0 square mile (2.6 km^{2}) (36.30%) is water.

== Government ==
The Town of Belleair has a Commission-Manager form of government. As of 2026, the Town Manager is currently Gay Lancaster.

As of 2026, the current mayor and commissioners are:

- Mayor – Michael "Mike" Wilkinson
- Deputy Mayor – Tom Shelly
- Commissioner – Thomas Kelly
- Commissioner – Todd Jennings
- Commissioner – Patricia Barris

== Demographics ==
Historical population
Census	Pop.	Note	%±
1930	212		—
1940	218		2.8%
1950	961		340.8%
1960	2,456		155.6%
1970	2,962		20.6%
1980	3,673		24.0%
1990	3,968		8.0%
2000	4,067		2.5%
2010	3,869		−4.9%
2020	4,273		10.4%
U.S. Decennial Census

=== Racial and ethnic composition ===
Belleair racial composition (Hispanics excluded from racial categories) (NH = Non-Hispanic)
Race	Pop 2010	Pop 2020	% 2010	% 2020
White (NH)	3,618	3,859	93.51%	90.31%
Black or African American (NH)	31	39	0.80%	0.91%
Native American or Alaska Native (NH)	2	3	0.05%	0.07%
Asian (NH)	60	75	1.55%	1.76%
Pacific Islander or Native Hawaiian (NH)	0	1	0.00%	0.02%
Some other race (NH)	4	13	0.10%	0.30%
Two or more races/Multiracial (NH)	28	103	0.72%	2.41%
Hispanic or Latino (any race)	126	180	3.26%	4.21%
Total	3,869	4,273		

=== 2020 census ===
As of the 2020 census, Belleair had a population of 4,273. The median age was 60.5 years. 11.7% of residents were under the age of 18 and 39.9% of residents were 65 years of age or older. For every 100 females there were 87.7 males, and for every 100 females age 18 and over there were 86.1 males age 18 and over.

As of 2020, 100.0% of residents lived in urban areas, while 0.0% lived in rural areas.

In 2020, there were 2,021 households in Belleair, of which 15.4% had children under the age of 18 living in them. Of all households, 56.3% were married-couple households, 12.9% were households with a male householder and no spouse or partner present, and 26.4% were households with a female householder and no spouse or partner present. About 30.4% of all households were made up of individuals and 19.1% had someone living alone who was 65 years of age or older.

In 2020, there were 2,436 housing units, of which 17.0% were vacant. The homeowner vacancy rate was 2.5% and the rental vacancy rate was 4.8%.

According to the Census Bureau's 2020 American Community Survey 5-year estimates, there were 1,230 families residing in the town.

=== 2010 census ===
As of the 2010 United States census, there were 3,869 people, 1,702 households, and 1,025 families residing in the town.

=== 2000 census ===
At the 2000 census there were 4,067 people, 1,973 households, and 1,225 families in the town. The population density was 2,265.8 inhabitants per square mile (874.8/km^{2}). There were 2,263 housing units at an average density of 1,260.8 per square mile (486.8/km^{2}). The racial makeup of the town was 98.35% White, 0.15% African American, 0.15% Native American, 0.39% Asian, 0.20% from other races, and 0.76% from two or more races. Hispanic or Latino of any race were 2.53%.

Of the 1,973 households in 2000, 17.9% had children under the age of 18 living with them, 55.1% were married couples living together, 5.4% had a female householder with no husband present, and 37.9% were non-families. 34.2% of households were one person and 21.3% were one person aged 65 or older. The average household size was 2.04 and the average family size was 2.58.

In 2000, the age distribution was 16.2% under the age of 18, 2.5% from 18 to 24, 20.1% from 25 to 44, 28.5% from 45 to 64, and 32.6% 65 or older. The median age was 53 years. For every 100 females, there were 84.7 males. For every 100 females age 18 and over, there were 79.1 males.

In 2000, the median household income was $63,267 and the median family income was $96,400. Males had a median income of $61,548 versus $31,313 for females. The per capita income for the town was $59,164. About 1.4% of families and 4.0% of the population were below the poverty line, including 2.7% of those under age 18 and 4.4% of those age 65 or over.

== Notable people ==
- Joseph P. Cleland, U.S. Army major general
- Mary Grizzle, Florida state legislator
- Hulk Hogan, professional wrestler and reality television star
- Nigel Mansell, Formula One and CART driver
- Dean Young, cartoonist of Blondie
