= High Meadows (disambiguation) =

High Meadows, High Meadow, or Highmeadow may refer to:

- High Meadows, a historic home located near Scottsville, Albemarle County, Virginia, USA.
- High Meadow, a nature reserve near Dover in Kent, UK.
- High Meadows Country Club, a golf club and residential neighborhood in Roaring Gap, North Carolina, USA
- High Meadows Environmental Institute, a center for environmental research studying effects of climate change, at Princeton University New Jersey, USA
- Highmeadow Woods, a 1,075 hectare, ancient woodland on the Gloucestershire, Herefordshire, and Monmouthshire border, and part of the wider Forest of Dean, UK
