= Christ Church Glendower =

Historic church in Virginia, United States

- U.S. National Register of Historic Places
- Virginia Landmarks Register
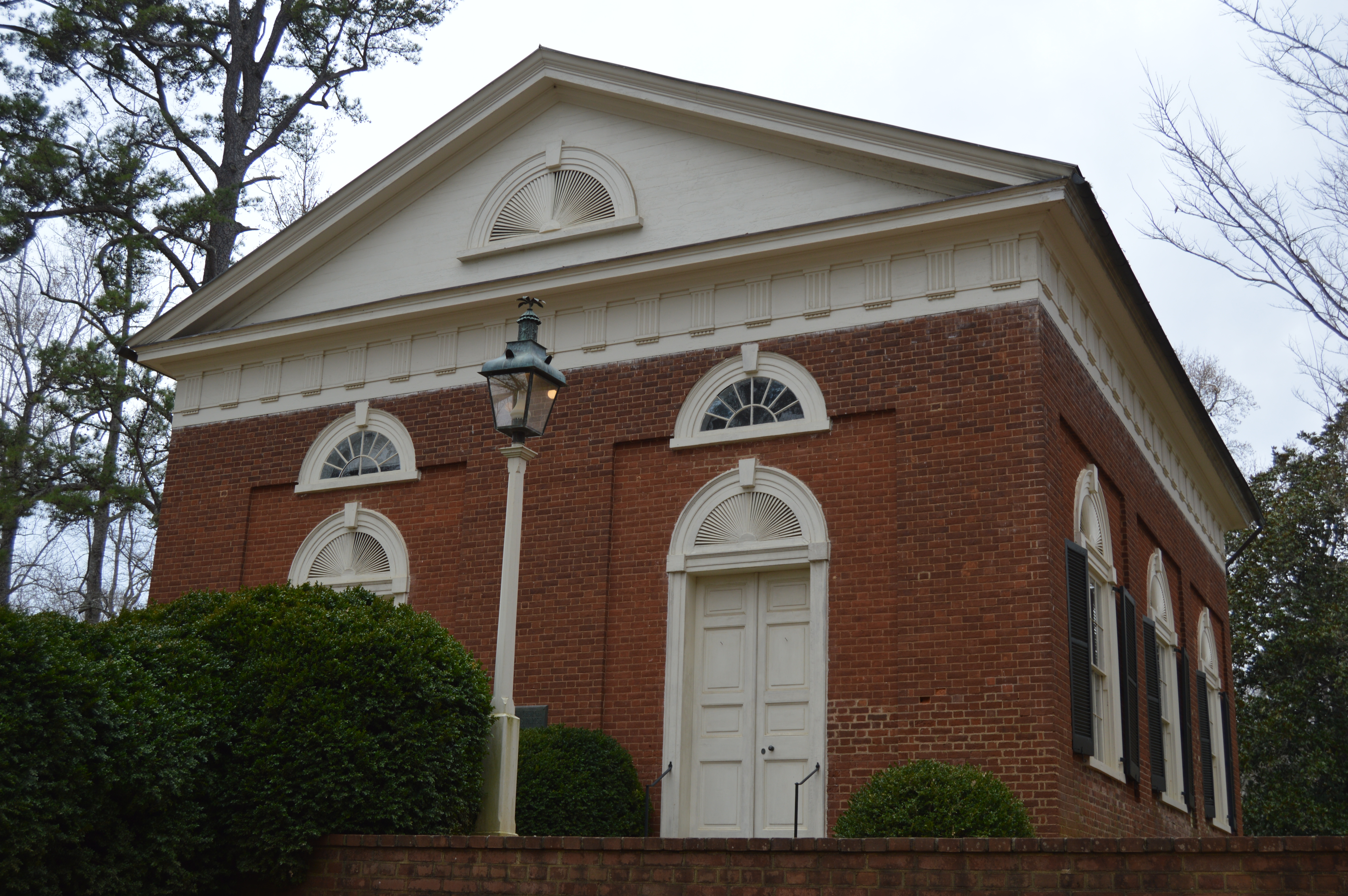
- Front and northern side

- Location within Virginia Location within the United States
- Location: On VA 713, 0.4 miles (0.64 km) southwest of the junction with VA 712, Keene, Virginia
- Coordinates: 37°51′11″N 78°32′03″W
- Area: 10 acres (4.0 ha)
- Built: 1831
- Architect: William B. Phillips; Johnson, Craven, and Gibson
- Architectural style: Early Republic, Roman Revival
- NRHP reference No.: 71000974
- VLR No.: 002-0014

Significant dates
- Added to NRHP: July 2, 1971
- Designated VLR: March 2, 1971

Christ Church Glendower is the oldest (and most centrally located) of the historic Episcopal church buildings in St. Anne's Parish, Albemarle County, Virginia near Scottsville. Christ Church Glendower is located in Keene, built of brick in 1831 in the Roman Revival style. It features a full Doric order entablature with pediments at each end containing lunette windows, and is surrounded by a contributing cemetery. The remaining two historic churches in St. Anne's parish are also discussed below.

== History ==
In the second quarter of the 18th century, European settlement expanded upstream following the James River into the area which today comprises Albemarle County. In 1732, Edward Scott (1700-1738), a burgess from Goochland County, laid claim to (patented) 550 acres west of what became the town, and established a ferry across the James River to what in 1761 became Buckingham County. Scott's Landing (which became Scottsville) is now split between Fluvanna and Albemarle Counties, but was once a major port on a horseshoe bend of the James River, particularly during the heyday of the James River Canal, which opened in 1840 and became unnavigable during the American Civil War.

Meanwhile, the state-established Church of England established parishes to serve citizens' religious needs, as well as social functions including taking care of the poor and disabled. Albemarle County was founded during a gathering at Scotts' Landing in 1741, and the county formally received a charter from what became the Virginia General Assembly in 1744. Initially, the priest associated with then-vast St. James Goochland County parish (est. 1720) visited various settlements up the James River, and by 1738 set up arrangements for lay readers to hold services between his visits. Rev. Anthony Gavin (d. 1749) was a Spanish Catholic priest who traveled to England in 1715 as part of a Jesuit Catholic mission, but converted to the Church of England and published a sensationalist, anti-Catholic bestseller, A Master-Key to Popery in Dublin, Ireland in 1724. In 1736, the Bishop of London consecrated Rev. Gavin (who had married) and sent him to Virginia. The next year Rev. Gavin secured the Governor's appointment to this vast and unserved Piedmont parish. He diligently traveled among three widely spaced churches and established several more places of worship served by four lay clerks (and occasionally himself) in the developing western portion. Although Rev. Gavin initially bought slaves to work the 150 acres he received upon emigrating to Virginia, he came to oppose slavery as unchristian. When St. Anne's Parish was established with Albemarle County's founding, Rev. Gavin decided to remain at St. James Goochland.

Rev. Robert Rose (1704-1751) had emigrated from Scotland and had been assigned St. Anne's Parish in Essex County, Virginia before transferring to the new St. Anne's Albemarle in 1846. He was a doctor, lawyer, farmer and inventor as well as an ordained priest, and patented 84,000 acres between those parishes. Rev. Rose invented shallow-drafted watercraft by lashing together two shallow-drafted bateaux in order to transport tobacco bales down the James River from Albemarle through Richmond and thenceforth to the coast. Rev. Rose also became one of the executors of colonial (lieutenant) governor Alexander Spottswood. Rose died during a journey to Richmond (possibly initially intending to continue to Essex County). His grave is now the oldest marked grave at historic St. John's Episcopal Church. Rose's diary survives and provides insight into colonial life. The St. Anne's vestry removed Rev. Rose's longest-serving successor, Rev. John Ramsey (1752-1768) for immoral conduct, and arraigned him in Williamsburg, but the legal case ended with Ramsey's death. During vacancies before the American Revolutionary War, the parish received several visits from Rev. Frederick Hatch, assigned to the Frederickville parish in upper Albemarle County. Parishioners had erected a glebe house near now-dammed Totier Creek and the Scottsville/Howardsville Road circa 1750, but financial issues after a drastic fall in tobacco prices led to lawsuits, the glebe's sale circa 1780, and the departure of Rev. Clarles Clay (a nephew of Henry Clay).

The first three churches of St. Anne's Parish were built before the American Revolutionary War, though at least one shifted to a new parish as population growth led to the formation of new counties and parishes. They included the North Garden Church near Crossroads/North Garden, Forge Church on the Hardware River near Carter's Bridge, Ballenger Church near Howardsville (also in what became known as the parish's "Green Mountain" area), and Broken Back Church near Parmyra (in what became Fluvanna County in 1772).

All of the churches in St. Anne's Parish lost state tax support and ceased to function in 1784 when the Anglican Church was disestablished in Virginia. However, the Garden Church became a Methodist chapel, and was rebuilt after the American Civil War. The Broken Back Church on George Thompson's Broken Island Plantation also continued to function as a Methodist chapel; the Thompsons and other vestrymen helped establish that denomination in Virginia. That particular chapel, rebuilt nearby in 1820, became Salem Methodist Church.

Meanwhile, Scott's Landing was formally incorporated as Scottsville in 1818. Shortly thereafter, efforts to restore Episcopal worship in St. Anne's Parish began, as Rev. William Meade traveled down from his home Frederick Parish. Services were conducted in homes or at the dilapidated Forge Church until it burned down. In 1831, the parish vestry resolved to erect a new brick church somewhat centrally located near Glendower which would be named Christ Church. Documents from the parish records refer to the church's architect being a “Mr. Phillips.” William B. Phillips was a mason whom Thomas Jefferson employed and who also helped build the University of Virginia in Charlottesville. His design for Christ Church reflects the classical influences of Thomas Jefferson's architecture (as seen in the University of Virginia and his residence, Monticello). Now-Bishop William Meade consecrated Christ Church on June 28, 1832. It became vacant in 1853 until Rev. William Meade Nelson arrived the next year. The longest-serving rector was Rev. Elliott B. Meredith, who served for 35 years until retiring in 1946. Christ Church Glendower received much-needed structural renovations and an electric organ in 1961, and celebrated its 150th anniversary on June 6, 1982. It became the parish's central church after construction of a parish hall nearby in modern times.

== Other historic churches in St. Anne's Parish ==
In the years after Christ Church was built, two additional churches were constructed in St. Anne's Parish. These churches are St. John's Episcopal Church in Scottsville and St. Stephen's Episcopal Church in Esmont in the Green Mountain area. The original St. John's church was built in 1845. The entire riverfront town having been burned and all but two churches destroyed by General Sheridan's troops in a raid in March 1865; St. John's was rebuilt in the Gothic Revival style in 1875. Although occasionally closed in modern times, it stands in the Scottsville Historic District. The woodframe building was renovated and reopened in 2013; weekly eucharists are now held on Thursdays.

St. Stephen's Church is located in the parish's Green Mountain area. Also a frame building, it has Gothic windows and an asymmetric belfry, and was built in 1914 by James Marmaduke Branham, who became a vestryman. Its first rector was Rev. Zacharaiah Meade and it also had a Sunday School. Bishop William Cabell Brown consecrated it in 1916. Esmont was a plantation owned by Dr. Charles Cocke (who served in both houses of the Virginia General Assembly before the American Civil War) and later became an African American community; the area developed around a slate quarry and Chesapeake and Ohio Railway depot around 1900 and was among the country's largest soapstone producers by 1920, but closed in 1960. The church had only two services annually for a time, but is again holding weekly Sunday services.

In 1971, Christ Church was added to the National Register of Historic Places in recognition of its architectural integrity as an example of Jeffersonian neoclassical design. In 1976, the Scottsville Historic District was added to the National Register of Historic Places, with St. John's Church as a contributing property; the district's boundaries increased to add six additional properties in 2004.
