= Keene, Virginia =

Unincorporated community in Virginia, United States

Keene
- Unincorporated community
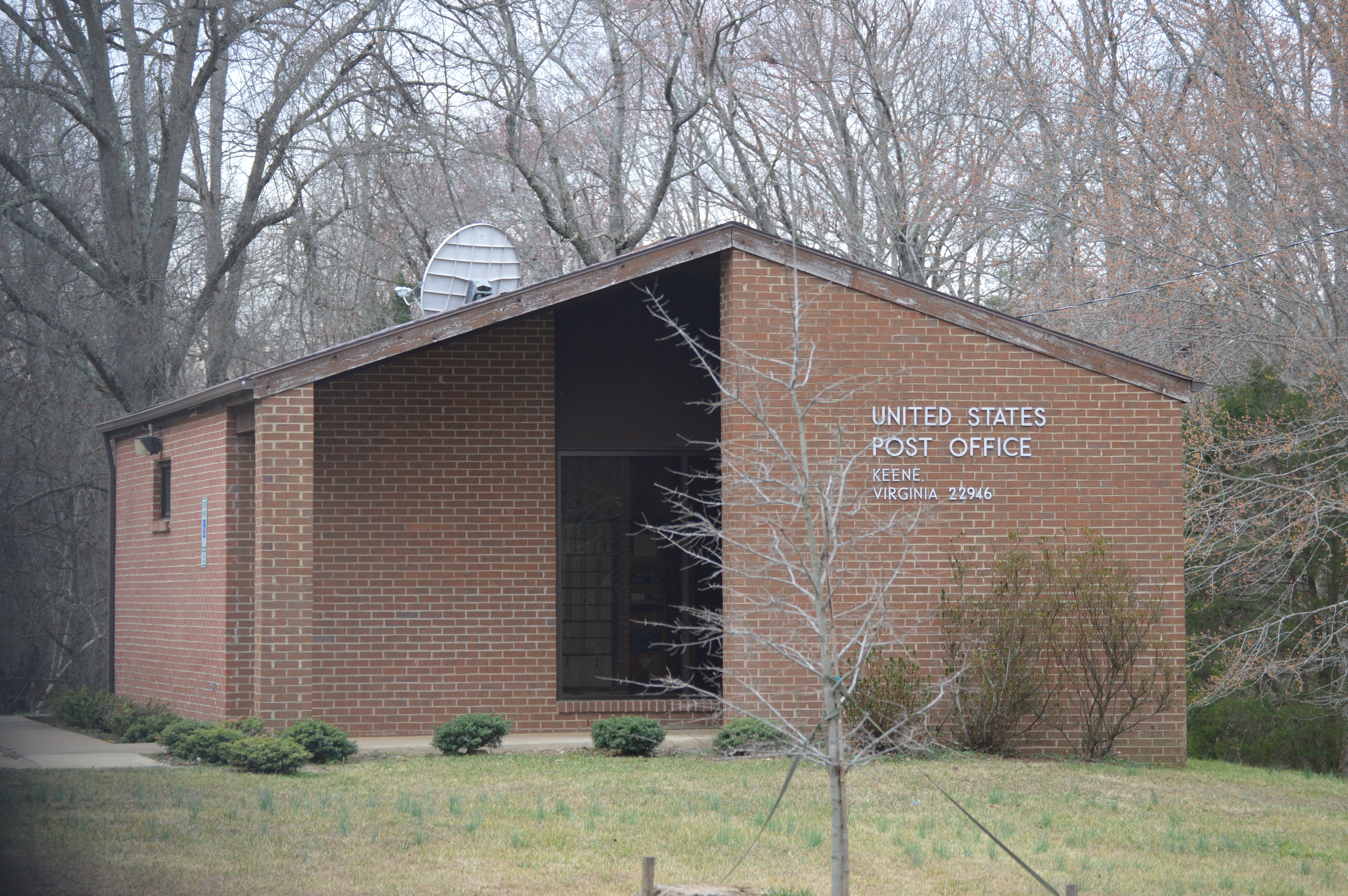
- Post office

- Location within the state of Virginia Keene (the United States)
- Coordinates: 37°51′55″N 78°33′19″W
- Country: United States
- State: Virginia
- County: Albemarle
- Time zone: UTC−5 (Eastern (EST))
  - Summer (DST): UTC−4 (EDT)
- GNIS feature ID: 1477457

Keene is an unincorporated community in Albemarle County, Virginia, United States. As of the 1990 census, the town had a total population of 10.

The town is known for being the location of the last sighting of a passenger pigeon in the wild, by Theodore Roosevelt. Roosevelt had "the first Camp David", called Pine Knot, here from 1905.

Christ Church Glendower, Plain Dealing, and The Rectory are listed on the National Register of Historic Places.

Mount Pleasant Baptist Church is a historically black church in Keene. In December 1974, the pastor was Rev. Frank Montague. The church held a Christmas Bazaar on Saturday December 14 of that year, sponsored by the Keene Birthday Club.
