= Mount Ida (Scottsville, Virginia) =

Historic house in Virginia, United States

- U.S. National Register of Historic Places
- Virginia Landmarks Register
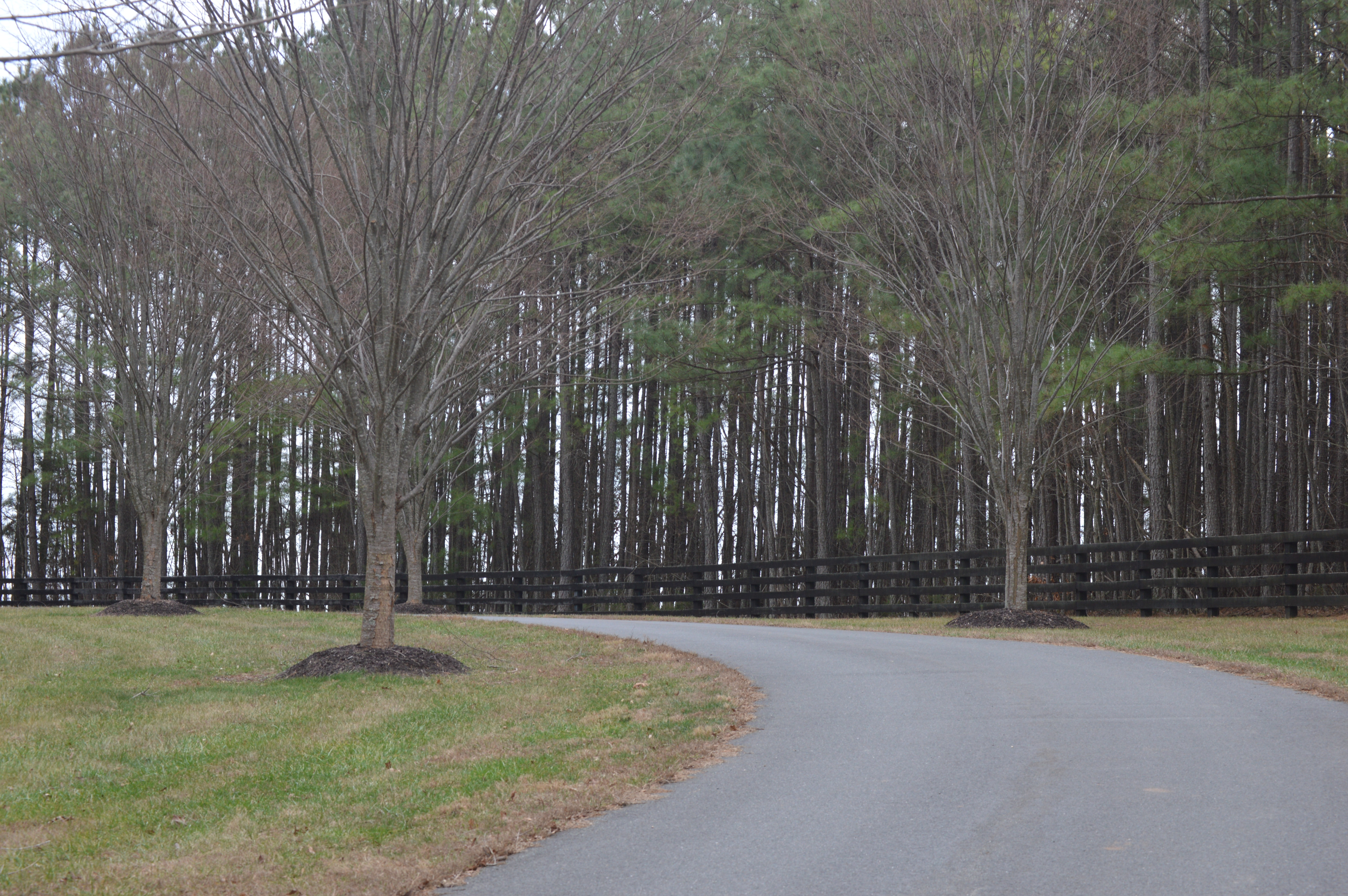
- Farm entrance

- Location within Virginia Location within the United States
- Location: East of VA 795, about 4 miles (6.4 km) north of Scottsville, near Scottsville, Virginia
- Coordinates: 37°50′58″N 78°29′25″W
- Area: 433 acres (175 ha)
- Built: c. 1785–1805
- Architectural style: Federal
- NRHP reference No.: 87000624
- VLR No.: 002-5001

Significant dates
- Added to NRHP: April 27, 1987
- Designated VLR: October 14, 1986

Mount Ida is a historic home located near Scottsville, Albemarle County, Virginia. It was built between about 1785 and 1805, and is a two-story, five-bay frame plantation house. It has a one-bay west wing. The interior features a parlor with elaborately carved paneling. The house was moved to a 422.65-acre site, with an elevated knoll located along a bend in the Hardware River, in 1995.

It was added to the National Register of Historic Places in 1987.
