= The Rectory =

Historic house in Virginia, United States

- U.S. National Register of Historic Places
- Virginia Landmarks Register
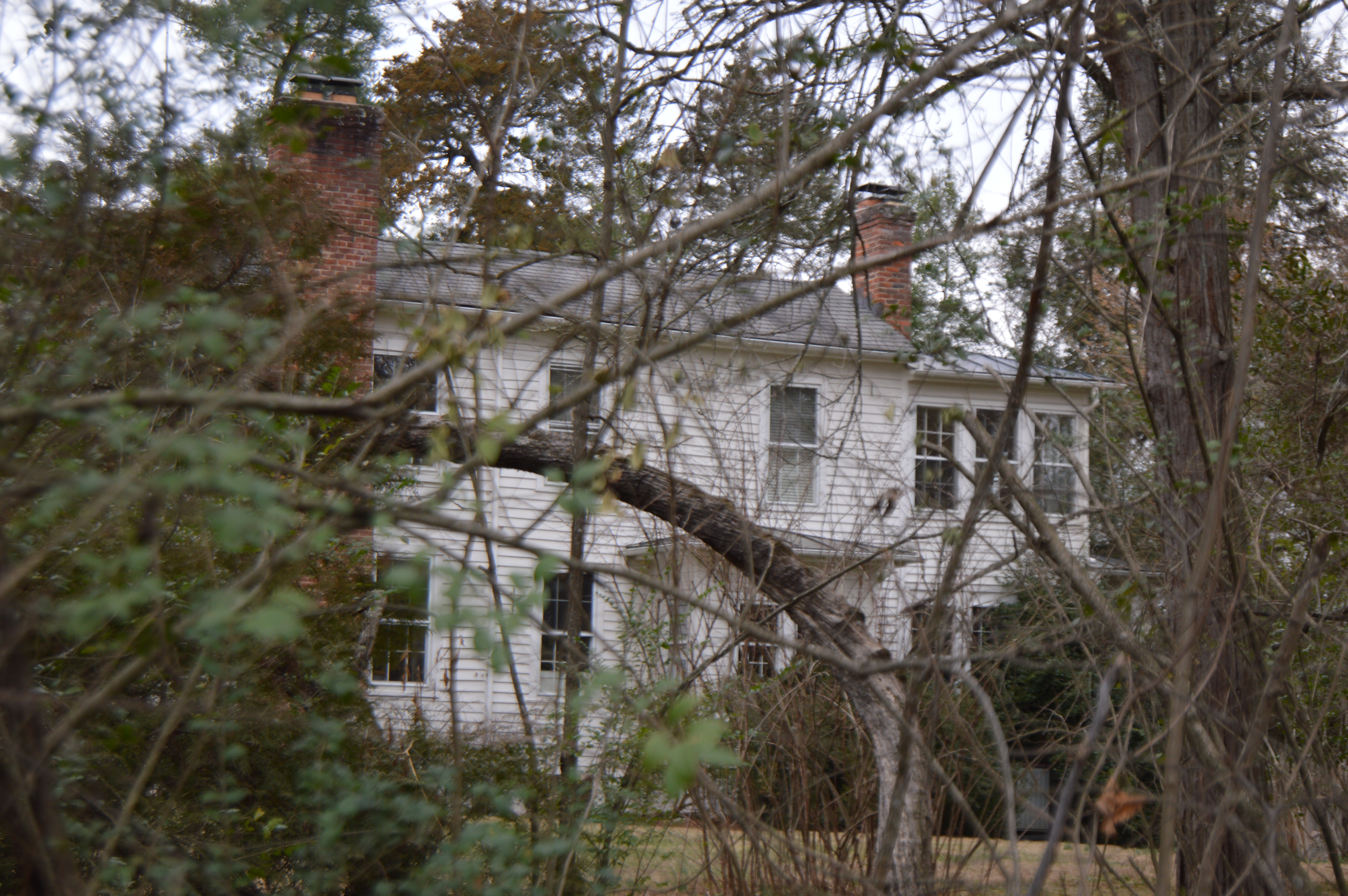
- Front of the Rectory

- Location within Virginia Location within the United States
- Location: Junction of VA 712 and VA 713, near Keene, Virginia
- Coordinates: 37°51′22″N 78°32′01″W
- Area: 61.3 acres (24.8 ha)
- Built: 1848
- Architectural style: Colonial Revival, Federal
- NRHP reference No.: 91001579
- VLR No.: 002-1831

Significant dates
- Added to NRHP: November 7, 1991
- Designated VLR: August 21, 1991

The Rectory, also known as Dyer's Store and Plain Dealing, is a historic home located near Keene, Albemarle County, Virginia.

It was added to the National Register of Historic Places in 1991.
