= Plain Dealing (Keene, Virginia) =

Historic house in Virginia, United States

- U.S. National Register of Historic Places
- Virginia Landmarks Register
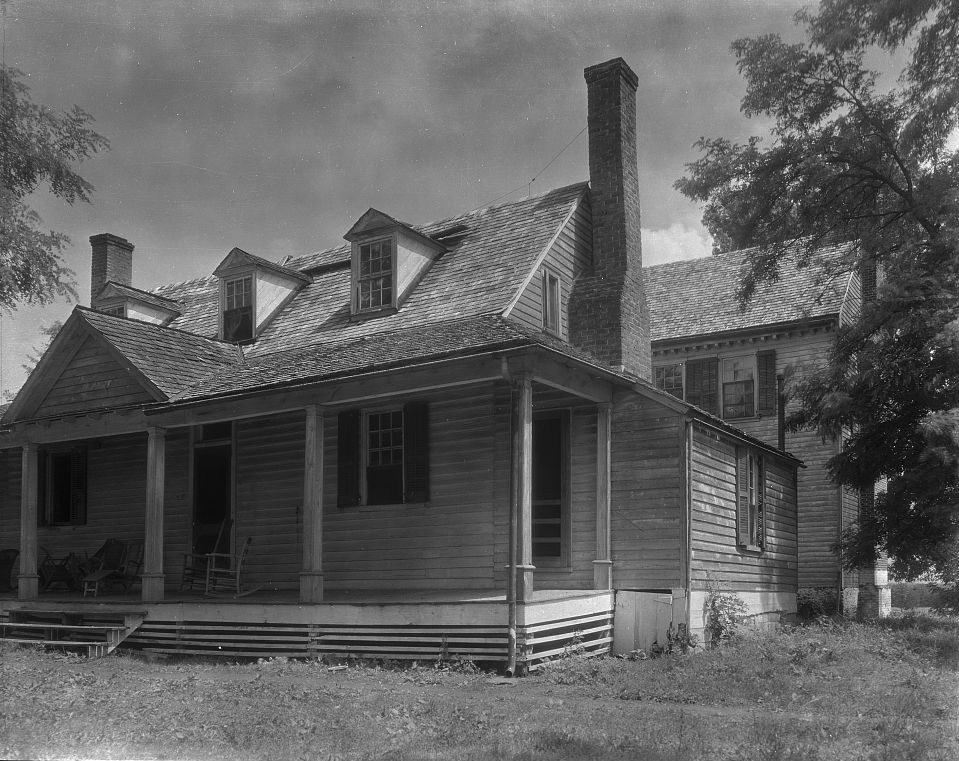
- Plain Dealing, Carnegie Survey of the Architecture of the South, 1933

- Location within Virginia Location within the United States
- Location: East of Keene, near Keene, Virginia
- Coordinates: 37°51′38″N 78°31′54″W
- Area: 11.5 acres (4.7 ha)
- Built: c. 1787
- Architectural style: Federal
- NRHP reference No.: 80004165
- VLR No.: 002-0065

Significant dates
- Added to NRHP: May 6, 1980
- Designated VLR: May 17, 1977

Plain Dealing is a historic home located near Keene, Albemarle County, Virginia. It is an H-shaped dwelling, consisting of a two-story main block and a parallel 1 1/2-story rear wing connected by a two-story hyphen. The two-story main section was built about 1787, and the 1 1/2-story wing may predate it. The front facade is five bays wide, and features an original tetrastyle porch supported on Doric order piers.

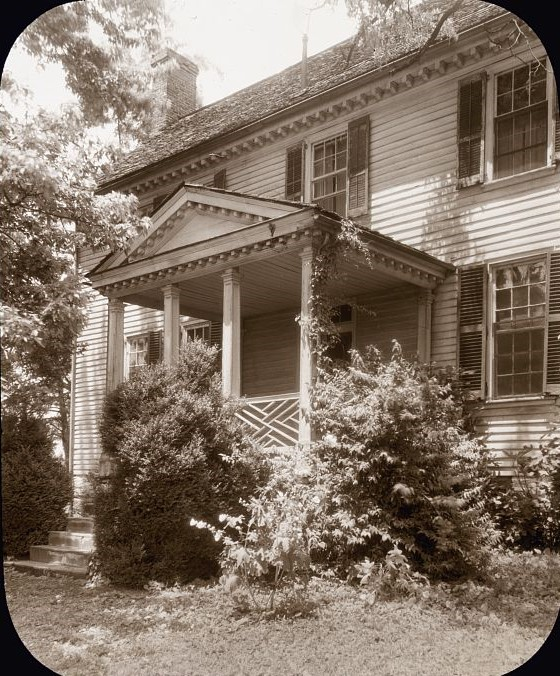
Plain Dealing, by Frances Benjamin Johnston, 1933. Original frame house built for John Biswell in 1761 and enlarged in 1789

It was added to the National Register of Historic Places in 1980.
