= Cliffside (Scottsville, Virginia) =

Historic house in Virginia, United States

- U.S. National Register of Historic Places
- U.S. Historic district – Contributing property
- Virginia Landmarks Register
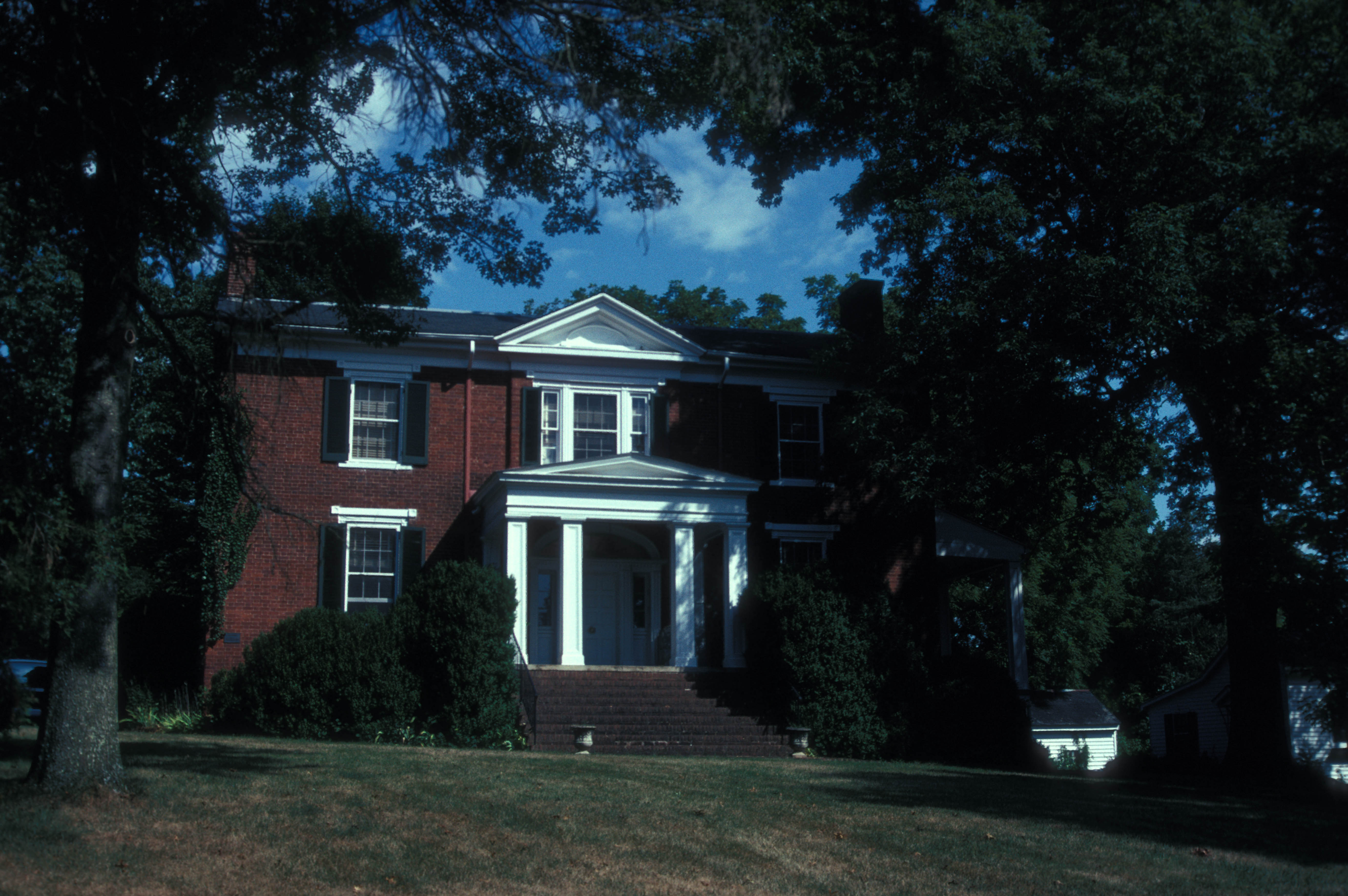
- Cliffside, April 1971

- Location within Virginia Location within the United States
- Location: North of Scottsville on VA 6, near Scottsville, Virginia
- Coordinates: 37°48′11″N 78°30′00″W
- Area: 11 acres (4.5 ha)
- Built: 1835, c. 1850-1860
- Architectural style: Gothic Revival, Federal, Jeffersonian
- NRHP reference No.: 82004536
- VLR No.: 002-0016

Significant dates
- Added to NRHP: September 16, 1982
- Designated VLR: October 20, 1981

Cliffside is a historic home located near Scottsville, Albemarle County, Virginia. It was built in 1835, and is a two-story, brick central passage plan dwelling on a high basement in the Federal style. A side passage rear ell was added between about 1850 and 1860. Both sections have low-pitched gable roofs and the front facade features an original single-story, tetrastyle Greek Revival portico. Also on the property are a contributing structure, the "Ginger House", a one-story frame office/schoolhouse probably erected in the mid-19th century, and the family cemetery. The house served as General Philip Sheridan's headquarters during the American Civil War.

It was added to the National Register of Historic Places in 1982. It is located in the Scottsville Historic District.
