= Scottsville, Virginia =

- Town
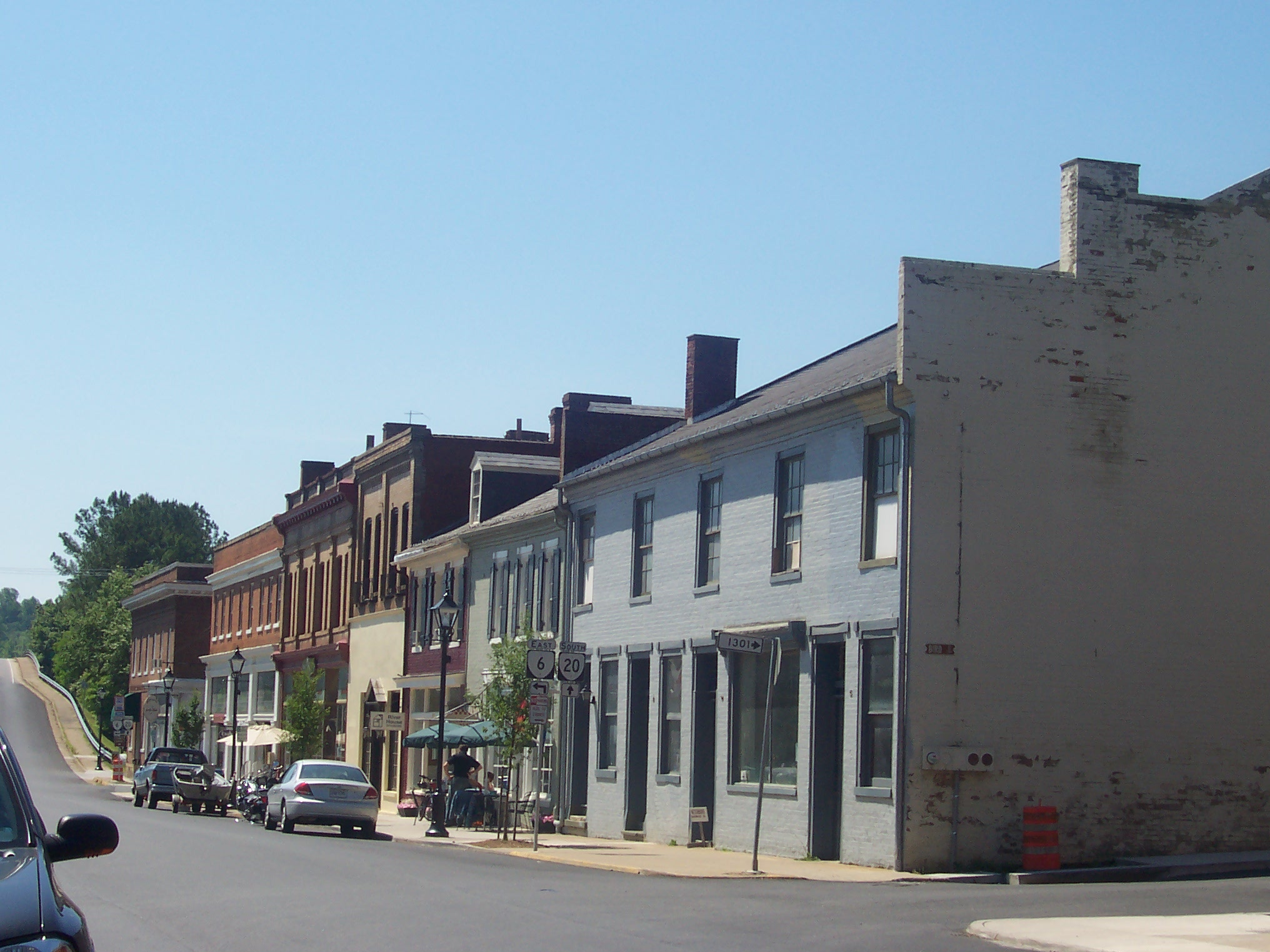
- Valley Street, Scottsville, Virginia

- Seal
- Interactive map of Scottsville, Virginia
- Country: United States
- State: Virginia
- Counties: Albemarle, Fluvanna
- Incorporated: 1818

Area
  - Total: 1.54 sq mi (3.98 km^{2})
  - Land: 1.52 sq mi (3.94 km^{2})
  - Water: 0.015 sq mi (0.04 km^{2})
- Elevation: 279 ft (85 m)

Population (2020)
  - Total: 524
- Time zone: UTC-5 (Eastern (EST))
  - Summer (DST): UTC-4 (EDT)
- ZIP code: 24590
- Area code: 434
- FIPS code: 51-70800
- GNIS feature ID: 1500041
- Website: scottsville.org

Scottsville is a town on a horseshoe bend of the James River in Virginia, United States. The town spans parts of Albemarle and Fluvanna counties and is the only incorporated place located within either county. It is part of the Charlottesville metropolitan area. As of the 2020 census, the population was 524.

== History ==
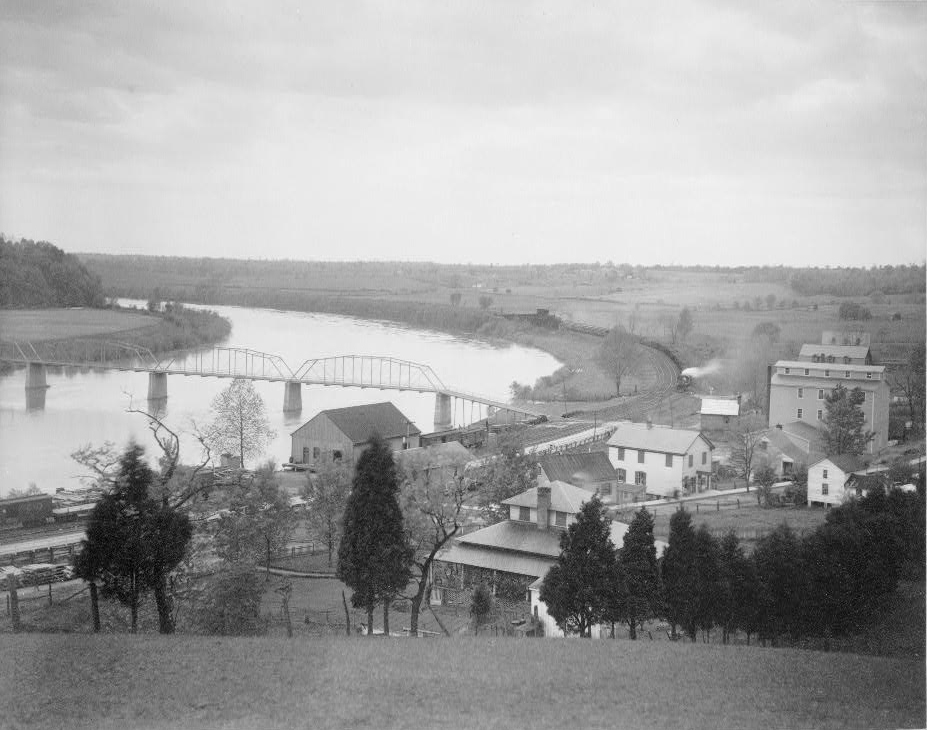
View from hillside of Old Scott's Ferry (circa 1911)

The Scottsville Museum provides online archives.

According to Scottsville's website, the town "served as Virginia's westernmost center of government and commerce during the 1700s, when rivers were the primary means of travel in the new American wilderness." During the late 18th and the 19th centuries attempts were made to improve navigability along the James, as well as other central Virginian rivers. Part of this was the construction of a canal running roughly parallel with the James west from Richmond. Scottsville was the largest port town along this route, called the James River and Kanawha Canal. The ultimate goal of this project was to connect the Atlantic with the Ohio River via the Kanawha River. These aims were not achieved, due to interruption by the American Civil War and the efficiency of the railroads. It did however succeed in making Scottsville a busy, prominent town. In fact, thanks to a wagon road connecting Staunton to Scottsville, all of the agricultural wealth of the Shenandoah Valley poured into town en route to Richmond and the sea, thereby making Scottsville the largest grain market in the state. Trade was disrupted when Union soldiers broke the canal works in the area. Then the train came, the tracks being laid directly on the towpath of the old canal, a monument to its demise. Eventually, the train too stopped taking passengers, leaving Scottsville a sleepy country town on a coal line.

Located near Scottsville, the Hatton Ferry serves as a seasonal crossing of the James River and has been the location of a ferry since the late 1870s.

Scottsville was the birthplace of Thomas Staples Martin, who served five terms as a Democrat in the United States Senate representing Virginia. Born at Scottsville in 1847, Martin served in the Confederate Army, then went on to practice law.

The Scottsville Historic District, Cliffside, High Meadows, Mount Ida, and Mount Walla are listed on the National Register of Historic Places.

In September 2019, the Albemarle County Board of Supervisors approved a plan to adjust the town's boundaries. The adjustment accounts for the expansion of the Scottsville Volunteer Fire Department and for a clarification of a boundary line along the James River.

== Geography ==
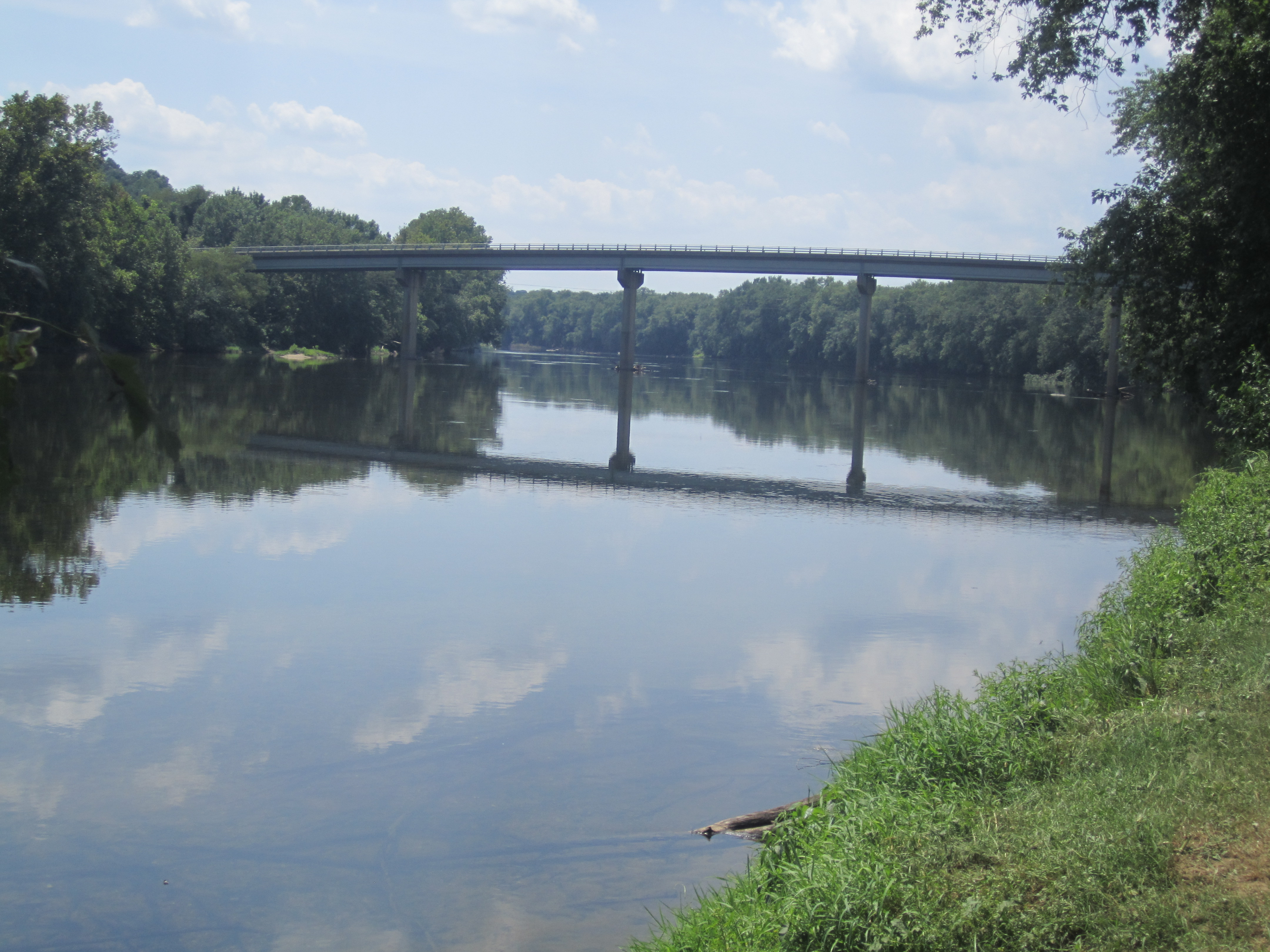
James River at Scottsville

Scottsville is located at 37°48′08″N 78°29′49″W (37.8022, -78.4969).

According to the United States Census Bureau, the town has a total area of 1.5 square miles (4.0 km^{2}), all land.

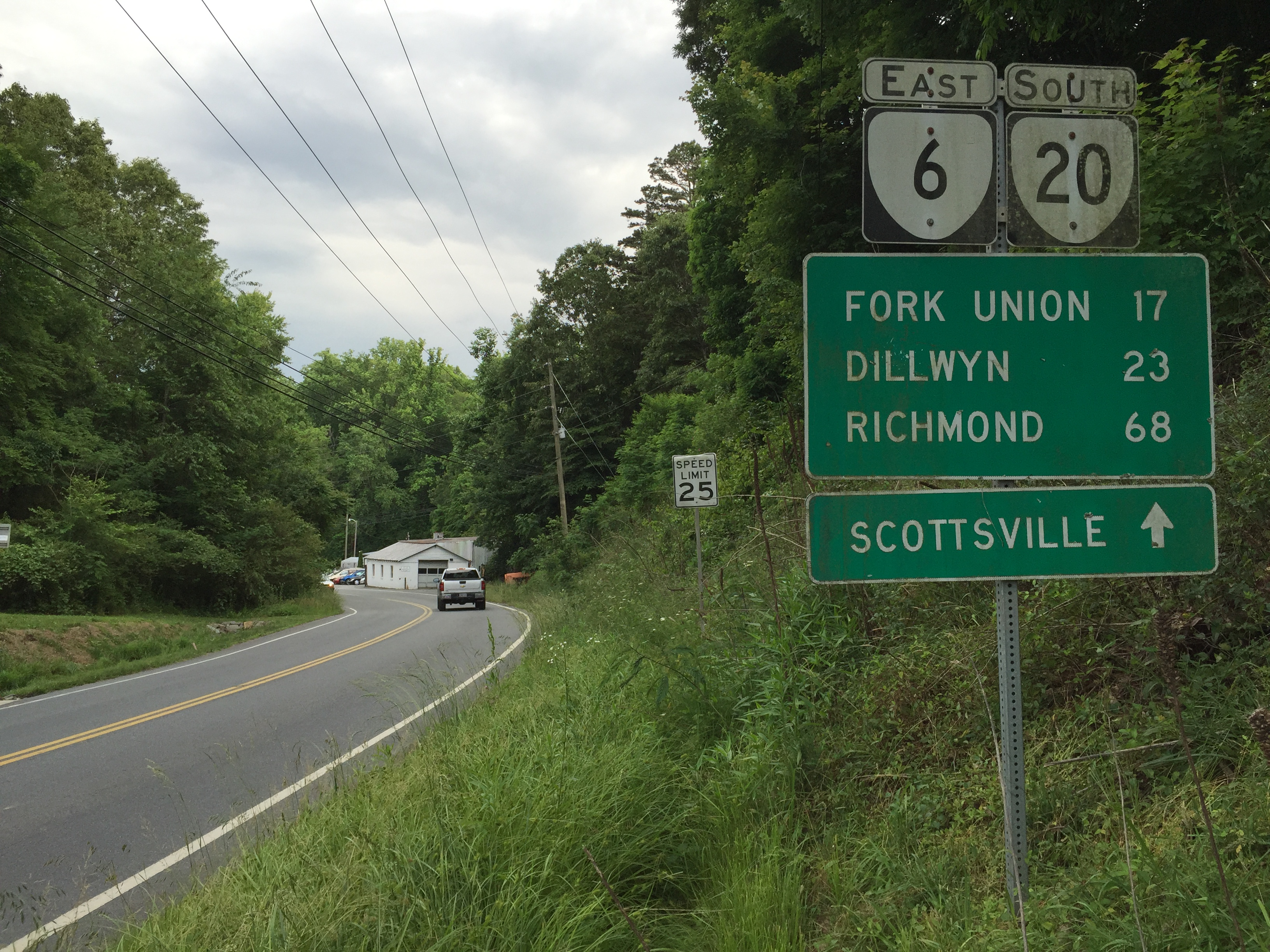
View east along SR 6 and south along SR 20 in Scottsville

== Transportation ==
The main highways serving Scottsville are Virginia State Route 6 and Virginia State Route 20. SR 6 extends westward towards Waynesboro and eastward towards Richmond. SR 20 extends northward towards Charlottesville and beyond to SR3 at Wilderness west of Fredericksburg and southward to US15 at Dillwyn.

== Education ==
The Scottsville museum website provides detailed information about and photographs of the school provision in Scottsville.

In the Jim Crow era, education was racially segregated until the 1960s. Segregated provision was made by Scottsville School and Esmont High School.

Today, education is provided by Monticello High School, Leslie Walton Middle School and Scottsville Elementary School.

== Demographics ==
Historical population
Census	Pop.	Note	%±
1870	388		—
1880	465		19.8%
1890	362		−22.2%
1900	384		6.1%
1910	283		−26.3%
1920	329		16.3%
1930	341		3.6%
1940	368		7.9%
1950	396		7.6%
1960	353		−10.9%
1970	290		−17.8%
1980	250		−13.8%
1990	239		−4.4%
2000	555		132.2%
2010	566		2.0%
2020	524		−7.4%
U.S. Decennial Census

As of the census of 2000, there were 556 people, 256 households, and 145 families living in the town. The population density was 360.2 people per square mile (139.1/km^{2}). There were 300 housing units at an average density of 194.7 per square mile (75.2/km^{2}). The racial makeup of the town was 93.51% White, 4.68% African American, 0.72% Native American, 0.36% Asian, and 0.72% from two or more races. Hispanic or Latino of any race were 0.36% of the population.

There were 256 households, out of which 24.2% had children under the age of 18 living with them, 42.2% were married couples living together, 12.9% had a female householder with no husband present, and 43.0% were non-families. 35.2% of all households were made up of individuals, and 14.1% had someone living alone who was 65 years of age or older. The average household size was 2.17 and the average family size was 2.82.

In the town, the population was spread out, with 22.2% under the age of 18, 7.0% from 18 to 24, 29.7% from 25 to 44, 23.8% from 45 to 64, and 17.3% who were 65 years of age or older. The median age was 40 years. For every 100 females, there were 85.6 males. For every 100 females aged 18 and over, there were 83.8 males.

The median income for a household in the town was $30,903, and the median income for a family was $41,667. Males had a median income of $31,369 versus $22,656 for females. The per capita income for the town was $17,432. About 11.1% of families and 12.9% of the population were below the poverty line, including 11.8% of those under age 18 and 11.1% of those age 65 or over.

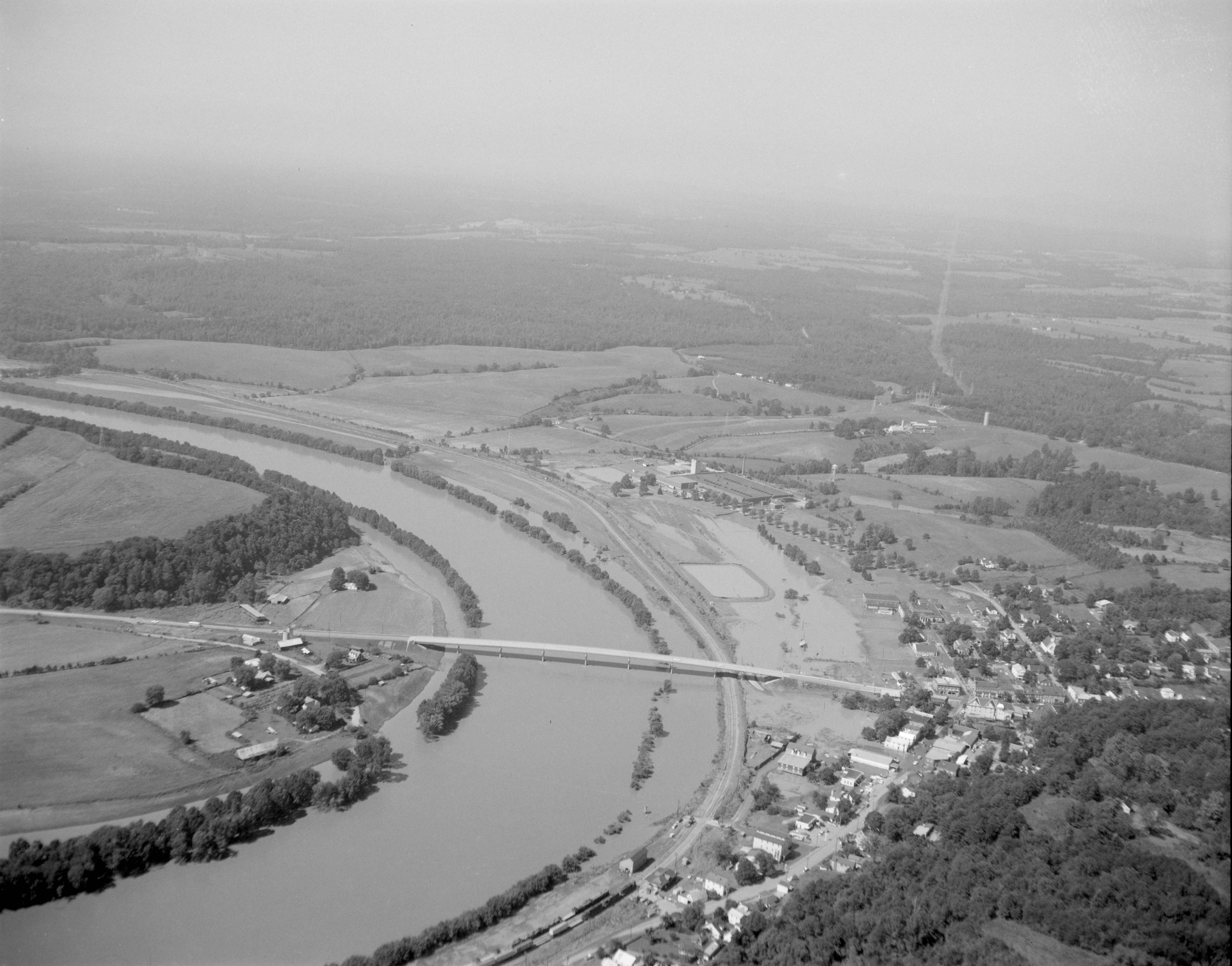
Flooding at Scottsville caused by the passage of Hurricane Camille in 1969

== Floods ==
Scottsville has not flooded since the levee was constructed in 1985. Since 1870, Scottsville has had twenty-one floods (defined as water levels of twenty feet or more above the average low water level). In 1985, the Army Corps of Engineers built a levee around the lowest portion of Scottsville, providing protection against further floods. Mayor A. Raymon Thacker spearheaded the movement to build the levee starting after Hurricane Agnes to prevent any more floods affecting Scottsville. The levee has been very effective preventing numerous floods in the post levee era.
