= Mount Walla =

Historic house in Virginia, United States

- U.S. National Register of Historic Places
- U.S. Historic district – Contributing property
- Virginia Landmarks Register
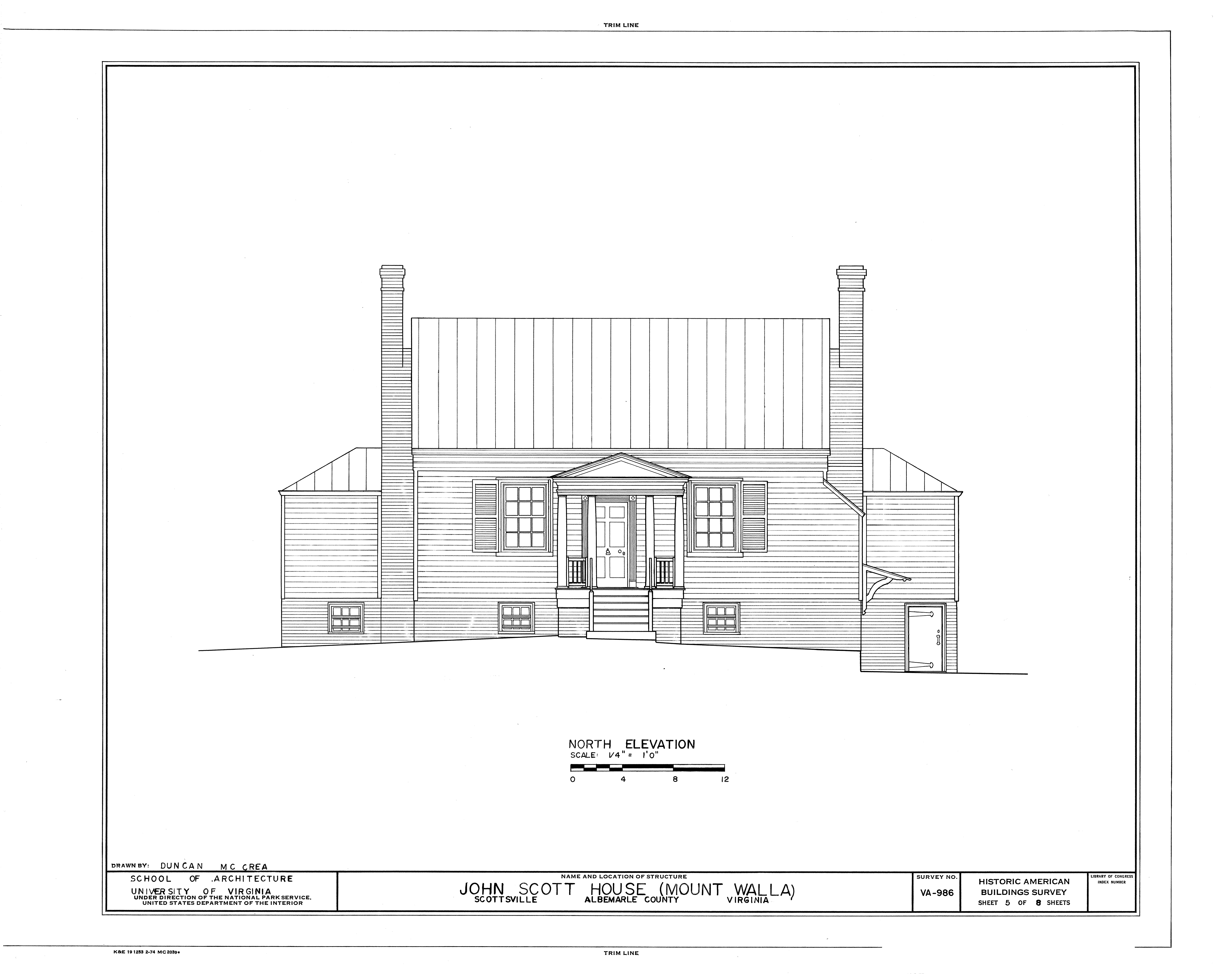
- Front of the house

- Location within Virginia Location within the United States
- Location: 604 Poplar Spring Rd., near Scottsville, Virginia
- Coordinates: 37°48′01″N 78°29′32″W
- Area: 13.4 acres (5.4 ha)
- Built: c. 1820-1840, 1836
- Architectural style: Federal, Greek Revival
- NRHP reference No.: 00001442
- VLR No.: 298-0009

Significant dates
- Added to NRHP: November 22, 2000
- Designated VLR: September 13, 2000

Mount Walla is a historic home located near Scottsville, Albemarle County, Virginia. It was built between 1820 and 1840, and is a 1 and 1/2-story, hall and parlor plan frame Federal-style dwelling. The house received a series of additions during the second half of the 20th century, more than doubling its size. Also on the property is a contributing smokehouse. The property also includes a family cemetery with Victorian iron fence. In 1836, the property was purchased by Peter Field Jefferson, grandnephew of the president.

The property is located in the Scottsville Historic District, and was added to the National Register of Historic Places in 2000.
