= Esmont High School =

Esmont High School was a segregated school for African American students in Albemarle County, Virginia from 1904 to 1951. This and the Albemarle Training School were the two high schools for Black students in the County.This school served a small rural population, graduating fourteen students in 1942 and nine students in 1943. In 1944 the school expanded from two to three teachers and developed a departmental structure for the first time. In 1951, its student population moved to Burley High School (Charlottesville, Virginia). Nine years after the school closed, in 1960, Yancey Elementary School opened on the same site.

== Curriculum and Faculty ==
The school served students in elementary and secondary grades.

Faculty Members

India Sargeant (d. 1922)

Harry Washington (1935–1936) also Choir Director

Isaac D. Faulkner (1941–1942)

Virginia K Yancey (1944-)

== School Library ==
The school had a library, to which twenty-two books were added in the spring of 1944.

== Student life ==
The school's a capella choir competed in Petersburg in 1936. In 1944, a Student Council was founded. The student newspaper in 1944 was the Esmont High School Journal, which covered news for all school grades in Esmont; it was edited by T. J. Sellers, who went on to become a newspaper publisher in Virginia and New York. The school competed in Oratory with other area Black schools such as the Lightfoot Training School, Orange County Training School, and Abrams High School. It put on its first operetta, Mary Hale Woolsey's "Star Flower," in 1944, with a cast of 13 students. There were multiple boys' and girls' singing quartets at the school this same year.

== Athletics ==
The baseball team played against Charlottesville's Jefferson High School.

== Administration ==
Principal Henry L. Summerall (1941–1942)

Principal Isaac D. Faulkner (1942–1943)

The school had a Parent-Teacher Association.
