= High Meadows =

Historic house in Virginia, United States

- U.S. National Register of Historic Places
- Virginia Landmarks Register
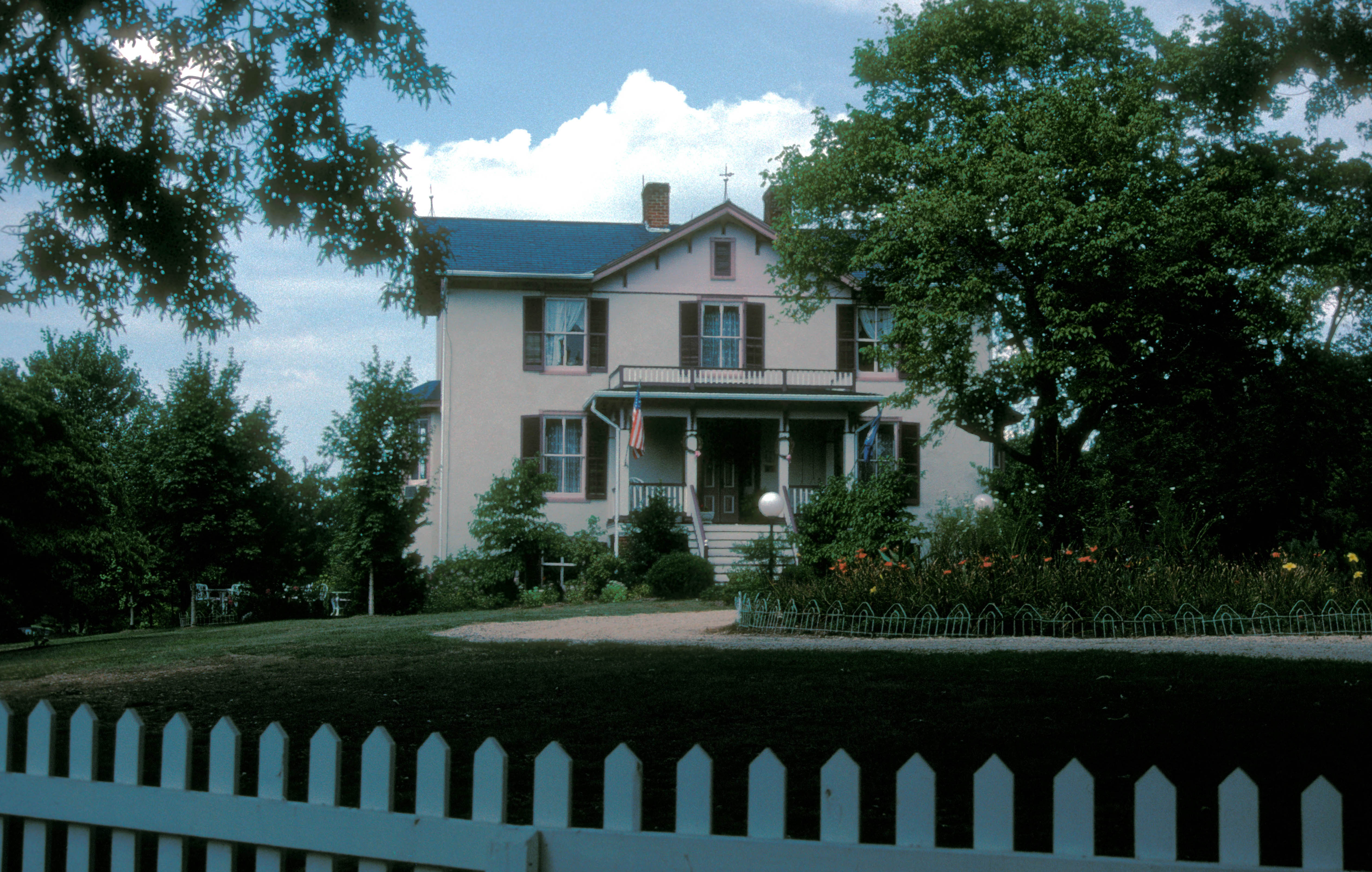
- High Meadows

- Location within Virginia Location within the United States
- Location: Off VA 20, near Scottsville, Virginia
- Coordinates: 37°48′33″N 78°29′56″W
- Area: 1.8 acres (0.73 ha)
- Built: 1831-1832, 1883
- NRHP reference No.: 86001185
- VLR No.: 002-1020

Significant dates
- Added to NRHP: May 30, 1986
- Designated VLR: April 15, 1986

High Meadows, also known as Peter White House, is a historic home located near Scottsville, Albemarle County, Virginia.

== History ==
High Meadows consists of a 1 1/2-story brick dwelling built between 1831 and 1832, and a two-story, 1883 stuccoed brick section. The 1883 addition more than tripled the size of the original dwelling and is connected by a frame, single-story passage which runs between and the length of both sections. The south facade of the 1883 section serves as the front elevation. It is two stories high and three bays wide and features a cross-gabled slate roof.

It was added to the National Register of Historic Places in 1986.
