= Scottsville Historic District =

Historic district in Virginia, United States

- U.S. National Register of Historic Places
- U.S. Historic district
- Virginia Landmarks Register
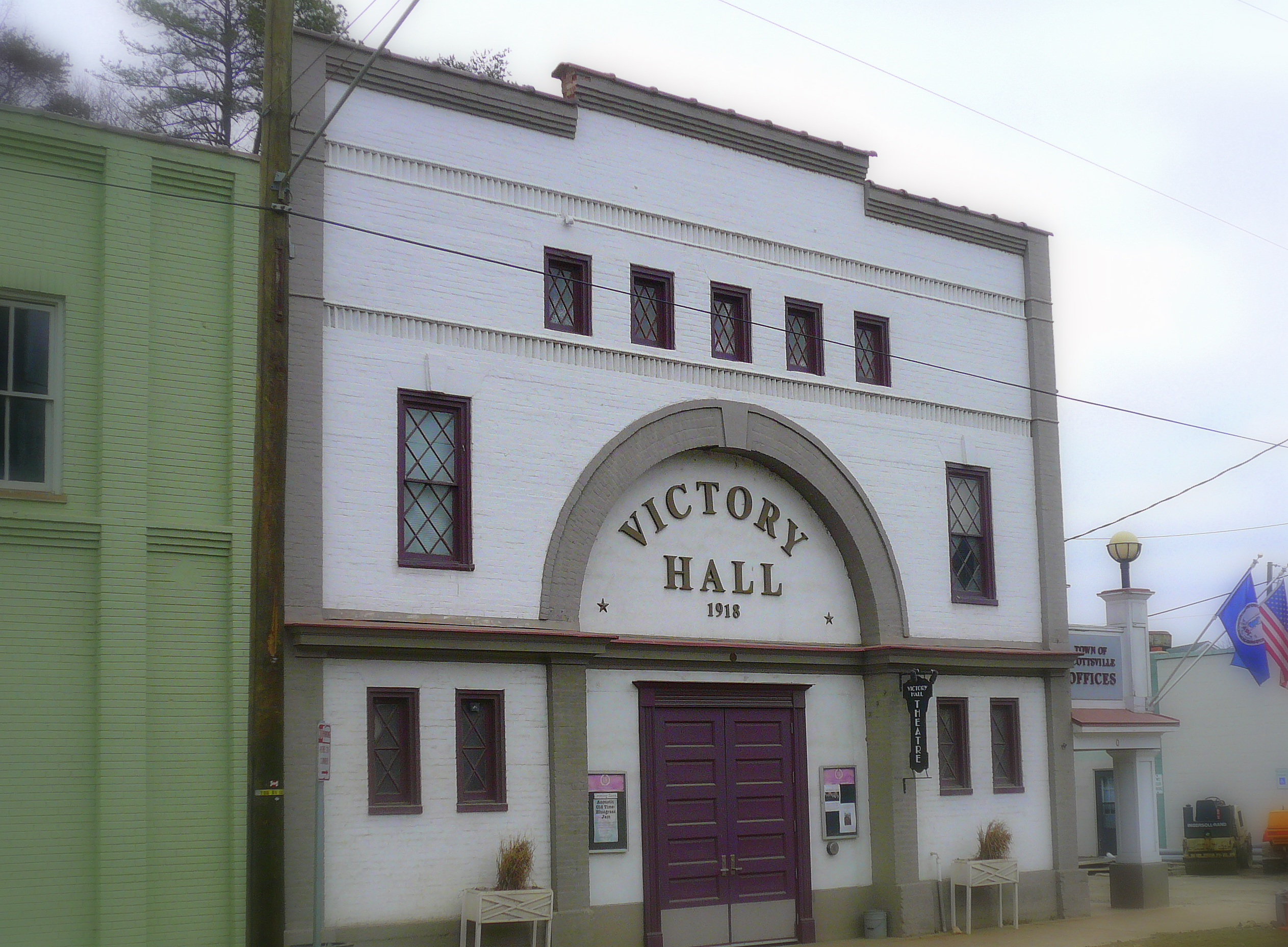
- Victory Hall in Scottsville, a contributing property to the district

- Location within Virginia Location within the United States
- Location: VA 6, Roughly bounded by the James River, Town Limit, the Riverview and Mount Walla, Oakwood and Cliffsiede, and Chester, Scottsville, Virginia
- Coordinates: 37°47′58″N 78°29′34″W
- Area: 315 acres (127 ha)
- Built: 1741
- Architectural style: Federal, Colonial Revival, Greek Revival, Queen Anne
- NRHP reference No.: 76002093, 04000034 (Boundary Increase)
- VLR No.: 298-0024

Significant dates
- Added to NRHP: July 30, 1976, February 11, 2004 (Boundary Increase)
- Designated VLR: April 20, 1976, December 3, 2003

Scottsville Historic District is a national historic district located at Scottsville, Albemarle County and Fluvanna County, Virginia. The district encompasses 153 contributing buildings, 1 contributing site, and 4 contributing structures in the town of Scottsville. The district includes commercial, residential, religious, factory and warehouse buildings in a variety of popular architectural styles including Federal, Georgian, Greek Revival, Gothic Revival, Italianate, Queen Anne, Prairie, Colonial Revival, and Craftsman. Notable buildings include Scottsville High School (1920), Riverview (1817), Chester (1847), Belle Haven (c. 1880), Oakwood (c. 1900), Herndon House (1800), The Tavern (mid-1700s), Scottsville Presbyterian Church (1832), Disciples Church (1846), Coleman's Store (1914), and the Fore House (1732). Located in the district and separately listed are Cliffside and Mount Walla.

== History ==
In 1732, Edward Scott (1700-1738), a burgess from Goochland County, laid claim to (patented) 550 acres west of town. Scott's Landing (which became Scottsville) is now split between Fluvanna and Albemarle Counties, but was once a major port on a horseshoe bend of the James River, particularly during the heyday of the James River Canal, which opened in 1840 and was rendered inoperatable during the American Civil War. Albemarle County was founded during a gathering at Scotts' Landing in 1741, and the county formally received a charter from what became the Virginia General Assembly in 1745, although Charlottesville became the county seat in 1762. Fluvanna County was established from the southeast portion of Albemarle County in 1777, and the area south of the James River became Buckingham County, so Scotts Landing was no longer centrally located.

During the American Revolutionary War, British raiders led by Col. Tarleton occupied much of the area, and attempted to secure military supplies stored in the old courthouse but was out-maneuvered by General Lafayette. Reportedly Governor Thomas Jefferson escaped capture during Tarlton's raid (which forced the legislature to evacuate first Richmond, then Charlottesville) after Jack Jouett's ride by hiding in a cave near Scott's Landing. The town's oldest church is the Scottsville Presbyterian Church (1832); the oldest portions of the United Methodist Church date from a similar date, but it suffered severe damage in 1976. The Scottsville Christian Church, built 1846, in 1968 became the Scottsville Museum. Although Scottsville ceased as county seat, in 1840 its economic importance in the area increased as the James River Canal opened. However, Union forces under the command of General Sheridan burned Scottsville in March 1865, and it never fully recovered.

After the American Civil War, Scottsville gained a station on the C&O Railroad, and had flour and other mills, as well as stores and banks. A wood-plank bridge across the James River supplanted the ferry (which had been in operation for 162 years) in 1907. However, Scottsville experienced several major floods of the James River, including one in 1914 which devastated the town. In 1976, fire destroyed a frame hotel built circa 1900, as well as damaged the Methodist Church. The Scottsville Historic District was added to the National Register of Historic Places in 1976, with a boundary increase to include six estates in 2004.
