= High Meadow =

Park in Kent, United Kingdom

Coordinates: 51.129°N 1.289°E

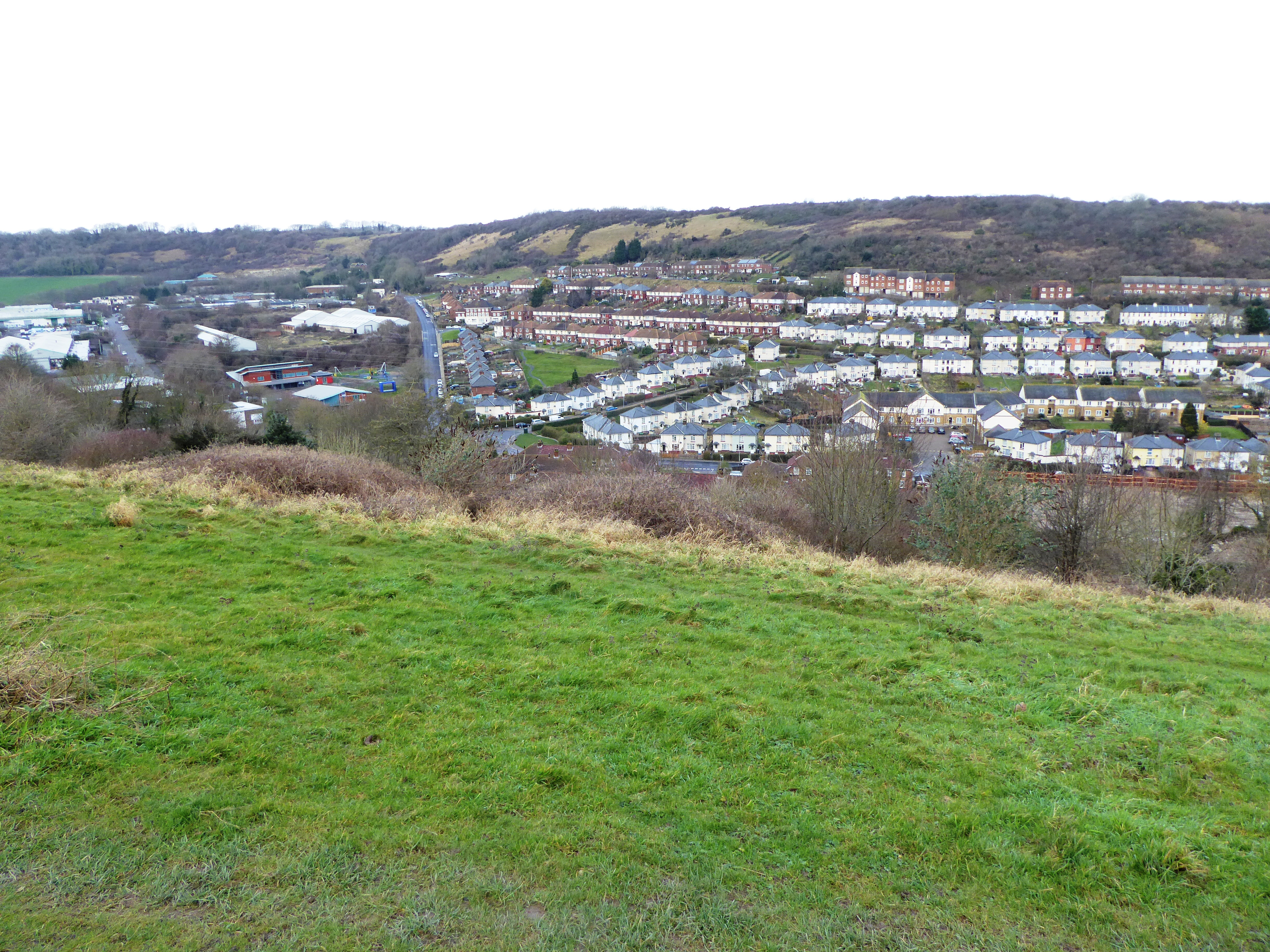
- View from High Meadow looking north
- Interactive map of High Meadow
- Type: Local Nature Reserve
- Location: Dover, Kent
- OS grid: TR 302 418
- Area: 21.3 hectares (53 acres)
- Manager: The White Cliffs Countryside Partnership

High Meadow is a 21.3-hectare (53-acre) Local Nature Reserve (LNR) on the western outskirts of Dover in Kent. It is owned by Dover Town Council and managed by The White Cliffs Countryside Partnership. It was declared a Local Nature Reserve in 2006.

This hilltop meadow has views in all directions. Management of the LNR has included grazing by konik horses and Exmoor ponies which help to preserve the variety of plants and animals. Flora include fragrant, common spotted and pyramidal orchids.

There are several entrances including from Edred Road and steep steps from Coombe Valley Road.
