= National Register of Historic Places listings in Nelson County, Virginia =

Location of Nelson County in Virginia

This is a list of the National Register of Historic Places listings in Nelson County, Virginia.

This is intended to be a complete list of the properties and districts on the National Register of Historic Places in Nelson County, Virginia, United States. The locations of National Register properties and districts for which the latitude and longitude coordinates are included below, may be seen in an online map.

There are 31 properties and districts listed on the National Register in the county, including one National Historic Landmark. Another property was once listed but has been removed.

This National Park Service list is complete through NPS recent listings posted May 1, 2026.

== Current listings ==
	Name on the Register	Image	Date listed	Location	City or town	Description
1	Arrowhead	Arrowhead	April 15, 2019 (#100003613)	115 Arrowhead Ln. 37°38′32″N 78°44′59″W	Wingina	
2	Blue Ridge Parkway	Blue Ridge Parkway	December 13, 2024 (#100011353)	Blue Ridge Parkway through Virginia and North Carolina; 37°53′17″N 79°08′59″W	Afton vicinity	
3	Blue Ridge Tunnel	Blue Ridge Tunnel	April 25, 2023 (#100008324)	215 Afton Depot Ln. 38°02′18″N 78°51′45″W	Afton vicinity	
4	Bon Aire	Bon Aire	July 30, 1980 (#80004203)	East of Shipman on Cabell Rd. 37°40′53″N 78°43′11″W	Shipman	
5	Edgewood	Edgewood	May 2, 2006 (#06000354)	3008 Warminster Dr. 37°41′21″N 78°42′23″W	Wingina	
6	Elk Hill	Elk Hill	March 27, 2007 (#07000220)	511 State Route 151; 37°52′37″N 78°54′38″W	Nellysford	
7	Greenwood-Afton Rural Historic District	Greenwood-Afton Rural Historic District	May 6, 2011 (#11000258)	Roughly 5 miles (8.0 km) to 7 miles (11 km) north and south of Interstate 64; 38°01′56″N 78°50′24″W	Greenwood	Boundaries modified on February 8, 2016. Extends into Albemarle and Augusta counties
8	Haines Chapel and Cemetery	Haines Chapel and Cemetery	February 10, 2014 (#13001174)	2600 State Route 56; 37°53′19″N 79°09′16″W	Vesuvius	Extends into Rockbridge County
9	Ryan Hall Elementary School		September 7, 2022 (#100008135)	71 Braddock Ln. 37°43′21″N 78°51′09″W	Shipman	
10	Lovingston High School	Lovingston High School	June 23, 2003 (#03000567)	8445 U.S. Route 29; 37°45′01″N 78°52′47″W	Lovingston	
11	Lovingston Historic District	Lovingston Historic District	November 9, 2005 (#05001232)	State Route 56 (Front St.) from Orchard Rd. in the north to Sunset Ln. in the south, parallel to U.S. Route 29; 37°45′35″N 78°52′15″W	Lovingston	
12	Mill Hill	Mill Hill	January 14, 2019 (#100003310)	524 Winery Rd. 37°52′43″N 78°55′36″W	Roseland	
13	Mitchell's Brick House Tavern	Mitchell's Brick House Tavern	May 3, 2006 (#06000355)	5365 U.S. Route 29; 37°42′56″N 78°54′44″W	Arrington	
14	Montezuma	Montezuma	July 30, 1980 (#80004202)	Northeast of Norwood on Norwood Rd. 37°38′55″N 78°48′04″W	Norwood	
15	Nelson County Courthouse	Nelson County Courthouse	May 17, 1973 (#73002041)	Off U.S. Route 29; 37°45′36″N 78°52′09″W	Lovingston	
16	Norwood-Wingina Rural Historic District	Norwood-Wingina Rural Historic District	August 20, 2019 (#100004305)	Arrowhead Ln., Capel Ln., Findlay Gap Rd., James River Rd., Norwood Rd., Pine Hill Ln., Round Top Ln., Taylors Store Loop, Union Hill Rd., Variety Mills Rd. 37°38′54″N 78°47′39″W	Wingina	
17	Oak Ridge Railroad Overpass	Oak Ridge Railroad Overpass	April 15, 1978 (#78003033)	Southwest of Shipman on Wilson Rd. 37°42′12″N 78°52′15″W	Shipman	
18	Pharsalia	Pharsalia	June 3, 2009 (#09000395)	2325 Pharsalia Rd. 37°48′05″N 79°01′41″W	Tyro	
19	River Bluff	River Bluff	July 30, 1980 (#80004205)	South of Wintergreen on State Route 151; 37°52′49″N 78°54′38″W	Wintergreen	
20	Riverside Farm	Riverside Farm	February 2, 2016 (#15001040)	6840 State Route 151; 37°45′09″N 78°59′14″W	Roseland	
21	Rock Cliff	Rock Cliff	December 22, 2015 (#15000927)	12615 Norwood Rd. 37°38′29″N 78°44′37″W	Wingina	
22	Schuyler Historic District	Schuyler Historic District	March 21, 2007 (#07000195)	Crossroads of Schuyler Rd., Salem Rd., and Rockfish River Rd. 37°47′29″N 78°42′06″W	Schuyler	
23	Shipman Historic District		August 13, 2025 (#100012116)	James River Road (Route 56), Craigtown Road {Route 639), Braddock Lane, Lentz Lane, Marietta Lane, Church Street, Lonesome Pine Road; 37°43′25″N 78°50′22″W	Shipman	
24	Soldier's Joy	Soldier's Joy	November 28, 1980 (#80004204)	Southeast of Shipman on Norwood Rd. 37°38′32″N 78°43′56″W	Wingina	
25	South Rockfish Valley Rural Historic District	South Rockfish Valley Rural Historic District	August 15, 2016 (#16000534)	State Route 151 and feeder roads 37°53′42″N 78°51′58″W	Nellysford	
26	Swannanoa	Swannanoa	October 1, 1969 (#69000221)	West of the junction of U.S. Route 250 and the Howardsville Turnpike; 38°01′41″N 78°52′08″W	Waynesboro	Extends into Augusta County
27	Tyro Mill	Tyro Mill	August 30, 2006 (#06000749)	State Route 56; 37°49′06″N 79°00′19″W	Tyro	
28	Warminster Rural Historic District		December 2, 2024 (#100010833)	Cabell Road, James River Road, Mayo Creek Lane, Mayo Creek Road, Mickens Lane, Midway Mills Lane, Ponderosa Lane, Ponderosa, River Circle, Warminster Drive, and Warminster Road; 37°40′11″N 78°44′22″W	Warminster	
29	Wintergreen Country Store	Wintergreen Country Store	November 9, 2005 (#05001233)	1368 State Route 151, at the Spruce Creek Ln. junction 37°53′07″N 78°53′56″W	Nellysford	
30	Major James Woods House	Major James Woods House	December 24, 2013 (#13000991)	3042 State Route 151; 37°53′27″N 78°52′12″W	Nellysford	
31	Woodson's Mill	Woodson's Mill	December 17, 1992 (#92001703)	Lowesville Rd. east of its junction with Woodson Rd. 37°43′04″N 79°03′41″W	Lowesville	

== Former listing ==
	Name on the Register	Image	Date listed	Date removed	Location	City or town	Description
1	Midway Mill	Midway Mill	April 11, 1973 (#73002042)	March 19, 2001	On the James River at the end of Midway Mills Ln.	Midway Mills	Demolished in 1998

== See also ==
- List of National Historic Landmarks in Virginia
- National Register of Historic Places listings in Virginia
