= South Rockfish Valley Rural Historic District =

Historic district in Virginia, United States

- U.S. National Register of Historic Places
- U.S. Historic district
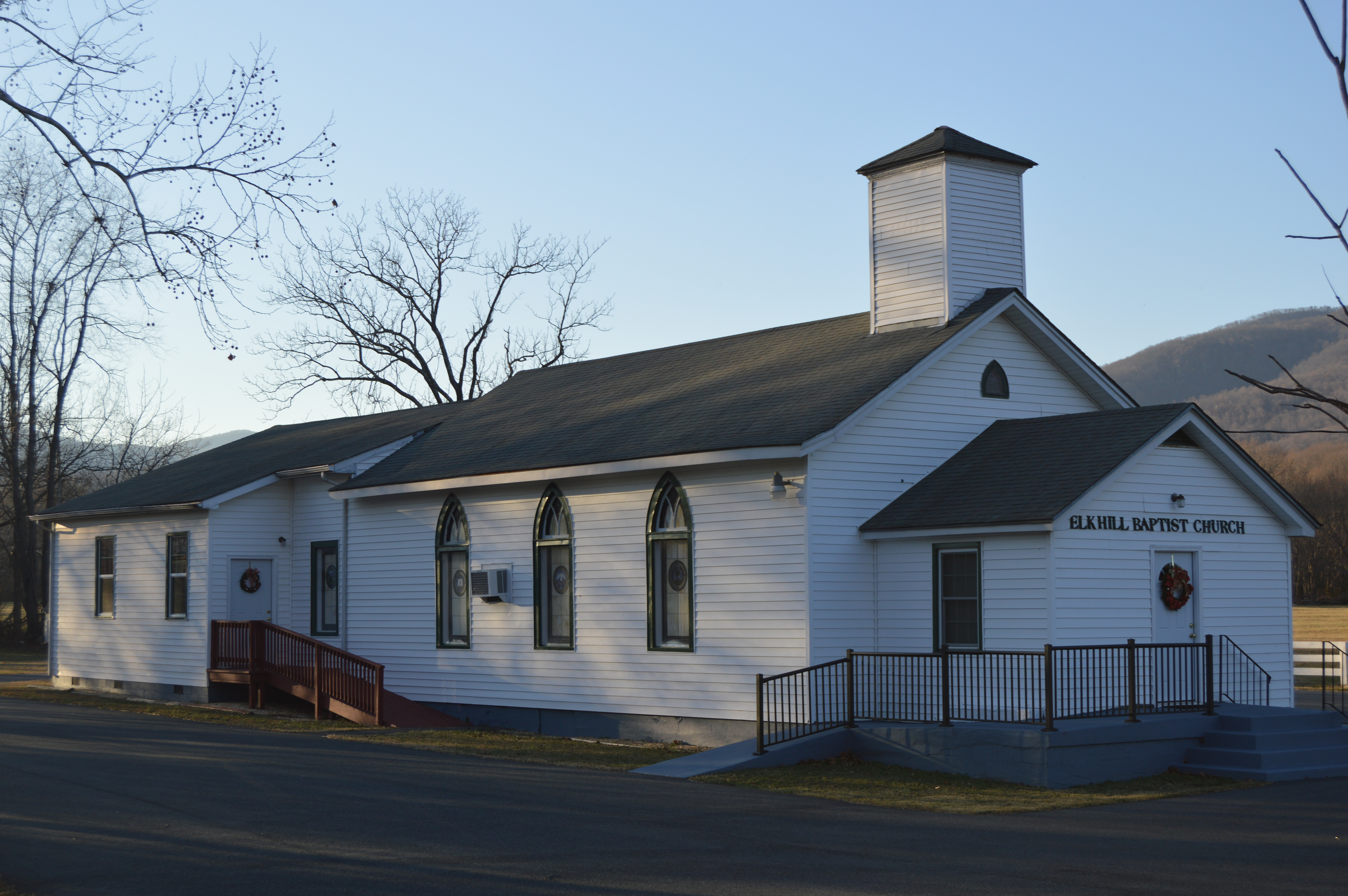
- Elk Hill Baptist Church on Glenthorne Loop

- Location within Virginia Location within the United States
- Location: State Route 151 and feeder roads, Nellysford, Virginia
- Coordinates: 37°53′42″N 78°51′58″W
- Area: 1,620 acres (660 ha)
- NRHP reference No.: 16000534
- Added to NRHP: August 15, 2016

The South Rockfish Valley Rural Historic District encompasses a large rural landscape in northern Nelson County, Virginia, United States. It includes more than 1,600 acres (650 ha) of rolling bottomlands of the South Fork Rockfish River, with Virginia State Route 151 as its principal transportation route. This area has been farmed since the 18th century, and many of its early land use patterns persist to this day.

The district was listed on the National Register of Historic Places in 2016. Properties within the district that were previously listed on the National Register include River Bluff, Elk Hill, Three Chimneys, and the Wintergreen Country Store.

== See also ==
- National Register of Historic Places listings in Nelson County, Virginia
