= Walter Sanders =

German-American press photographer

- Born: 1897
- Died: 1985 (aged 87–88)
- Citizenship: American

Walter Sanders (1897 – 1985) was a German-born American press and magazine photographer active in the 1940s and 1950s.

== Early life ==
Sanders studied economics in Germany and bought his first camera to take photos of his baby daughter, one of which Agfa used for a display. It was an experience which encouraged him to take up photography as a profession; with the support of editor Hans Reuter, he worked for German picture magazines.

== Magazine photographer ==
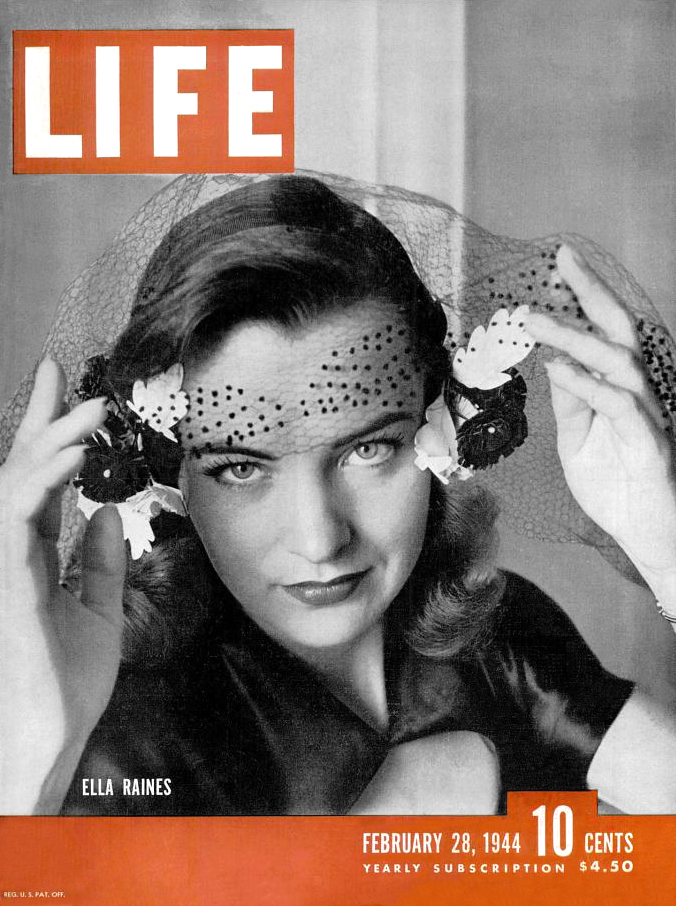
LIFE cover: 'Ella Raines, who has a star role in Phantom Lady, a new Universal film.' Walter Sanders is credited as photographer on page 25

During the 1930s the Nazi SS began to hound Sanders for "non-Aryan" activities, and as a result, with the assistance of his friend Alfred Seiler he emigrated to the United States in May 1937. There he joined the Black Star agency, producing work that was first published in Life in 1938. During the war years he and other immigrant photographers Fritz Goro, Andreas Feininger, and Herbert Gehr had their cameras confiscated for a few weeks after Pearl Harbor, but resumed work soon afterwards.

=== Covers ===
Sanders went on to join Life magazine's staff in 1944, producing several cover images for the magazine, including; 'New York': an American flag waving over a view of the downtown Manhattan skyline and waterfront, April 14, 1941; 'Short Coat': Betty Jane Hess wearing a fashionable short coat over her bathing suit on the Rye Beach boardwalk in Rye, New York, July 20, 1942; ‘Kid’s Uniforms': a boy and girl, each dressed in a child sized version of a military uniform, January 11, 1943; 'Charles Beard and "The Republic"', January 17, 1944; 'Ella Raines', February 28, 1944; 'Ballet Swimmer, Belita', August 27, 1945; 'Americans Maybelle Davis and Jim Cash in traditional alpine fashions, Postwar Germany', July 21, 1947; 'Famous Salzburg Marionettes', December 29, 1952; "K. of C. Honor Guard at Order's Birthplace" May 27, 1957;

=== Germany ===
In February 1946 he was sent on an assignment in Paris then travelled on to Germany where he was born, in Berlin. He first covered the U.S. Constabulary troop in Western Germany, for which he took his pictures of the Bayreuth parade ground from a light plane and again from the top of a fire truck extension ladder. in July 1946, he filed a story on American servicemen in Germany, capturing one with his wife enjoying a private moment in the park with Kronberg Castle silhouetted in the background. American students In Heidelberg whom he photographed in June 1947, and local reactions to them, were another of his subjects. He found the city changed radically and produced several stories from his trip; 'The Road Back to Berlin', revealing the destruction of war wrought upon the city and his own home, and 'Renaissance Man', the first of the Western Culture series, Mar. 3, 1947; 'Pre-Election Report on Italy' published April 12, 1948; and 'Report on the Occupation' for the February 10, 1947 issue of Life. He also photographed a crowd of Berliners watching, from ruins at edge of Tempelhof Field, a Douglas C-47 plane bringing food to the blockaded city.

=== Other magazine work ===
Sanders also photographed for Vogue magazine, including a 1941 story on the New Canaan Mounted Troopers started by Margaret Cabell Self in Connecticut; and a portrait of Catherine Littlefield, choreographer and director of the dances for Al Jolson's musical Hold Onto Your Hats (1940). For House and Garden he photographed Ludwig Bemelmans at Gramercy Park (1942).

== Portraits ==
Sanders' other portraits published in magazines include; English screenwriter and studio executive Joan Harrison, 1945; a scene from the film The Yearling, directed by Clarence Brown in 1946, which features American actors Claude Jarman Jr., Jane Wyman, and Gregory Peck; Actress Hildegard Knef on the streets of Germany, 1947; skater Jill Linzee, 1948; French cardinal Eugène Tisserant, April 1948; West German Economic Chief, Erhard Ludwig, May 1949; architect and designer Ernst Schwadron, June 1950; German Nazi concentration camp guard Ilse Koch on trial for the murder of inmates at Buchenwald, December, 1950; Marcel Breuer, architect, at Breuer Cottage on Cape Cod, August 1950; Irish-born magazine editor Carmel Snow with French fashion designer Coco Chanel in New York, December 1952; General James A. Van Fleet, 1953; Herbert Pulitzer in New York, March 1954; American politician and US Vice President (and later President) Richard M. Nixon talking to politician, author and editor Clare Boothe Luce and US Secretary of State John Foster Dulles in Washington DC, March 1956; Chinese Pei-Chao Li, separated from husband for seven years due to US immigration restrictions, 1956; American artist and sculptor Alexander Calder with a maquette of his mobile for Idlewild International Airport, 1957; the barmaid at a restaurant where Rudolf Invanovich Abel and his agents met, August 1957; American businessman and Supreme Knight of the Knights of Columbus Catholic fraternal organization Luke E. Hart on the bleachers at Yankee Stadium, April 1957; Scientists Dr. Vladimir Zworykin and Dr. John Biesele viewing cancer cells, magnified on the screen of color TV monitor at the Rockefeller Institute in July 1958; artist Marisol Escobar with her carved wooded sculptures, New York, 1958; American lawyer Paul A. Porter at the Arden House Economic Conference, New York, 1958; Canadian ice hockey player Lou Fortinato, of the New York Rangers, his broken nose covered by bandages, February, 1959; the wife of Canadian Prime Minister, Mrs. John Diefenbaker dressed for dinner with Queen Elizabeth; Widow Evalyn Gibson crying over a photo of her husband Orville in a newspaper; Opera singer Marian Anderson in front of an earlier photo of her 1939 free concert at the Lincoln Memorial, 1960; American jeweller Harry Winston at his 5th Avenue store, New York, March 1960; designer Pauline Fraccia of R&K Originals, 1960; Welsh screenwriter Keith Winter (1906 - 1983); fashion manufacturer Max Matlick, of Zelinka-Matlick, in the Garment District, New York, 1960; American fashion designer Oleg Cassini; John F. Kennedy on the campaign trail, September 1960; and physicist Lise Meitner with others at a reunion for Nobel Prize-winners held at a resort on Lake Constance, Lindau, Germany in 1962.

== Exhibitions ==
Sanders was represented in two exhibitions at the Museum of Modern Art, New York. His 'Television Dog Star' (published in Life, March 27, 1950) appeared in the show Memorable Life Photographs, November 20–December 12, 1951. In his selection for the world-touring The Family of Man',January 24–May 8, 1955, which was seen by 9 million visitors, Edward Steichen included two of Sanders' more energetic pictures; in the first, two blacksmiths work at an anvil, and the second represents a broadly smiling Yugoslavian woman thrusting armfuls of bread loaves toward the camera.
