= Wintergreen Resort =

Resort in Virginia, United States

- The Peak of Eagle's Swoop
- Interactive map of Wintergreen Resort
- Location: Wintergreen, Nelson County, Virginia, USA
- Nearest city: Charlottesville
- Coordinates: 37°55′48″N 78°56′30″W
- Vertical: 1,003 ft (306 m)
- Top elevation: 3,515 ft (1,071 m)
- Base elevation: 2,512 ft (766 m)
- Skiable area: 129 acres (52 ha)
- Trails: 26 total 23% beginner 35% intermediate 42% advanced
- Longest run: Tyro 1.4 mi (2.3 km)
- Lift system: 5 total (2 High-speed six pack chairs, 1 quad chair, 1 triple chair, 1 double chair)
- Lift capacity: 11,200 per hour
- Terrain parks: 1
- Snowfall: 35 in (890 mm)
- Snowmaking: 100%
- Night skiing: 54%
- Website: wintergreenresort.com

Wintergreen Resort is a four-season mountain resort on the eastern slopes of the Blue Ridge Mountains, located in Nelson County, Virginia with portions in Augusta County, near the towns of Wintergreen and Nellysford.

Located near the cities of Lynchburg, Waynesboro, and Charlottesville, the resort is within a three-hour drive of Washington, D.C.. It opened in 1975 and is currently owned and managed by Pacific Group Resorts, Inc. Unlike many ski resorts, Wintergreen is a "Mountain Top" resort in which all of the amenities are built on the peaks and ridges, rather than at the traditional base.

== History ==
Top of the Highlands in January 2006, Wintergreen Resort

In 1969, a 10,000 acres (4,000 ha) tract of land known as The Big Survey, located in Virginia's Blue Ridge Mountains and home to a wide variety of forestry, timberland, and wildlife, was purchased by a group of investors. Within a few years, Cabot, Cabot & Forbes of Boston purchased The Big Survey, and the planning of the Wintergreen community began. The Sea Pines Company soon joined the group to plan and market the area and a new community.

By 1975, the resort had a large ski area, consisting of eight slopes and three chairlifts, which opened with Virginia Governor Mills E. Godwin attending. The resort's first restaurant, The Copper Mine, was open to the public only during the winter months. The original welcoming center, the Wintergreen Country Store, was later added to the National Register of Historic Places in 2005. In later years, additional ski runs were added in cleared areas to the west and east of the original development and resort village.

In 1976 Melba Investors, Inc., a wholly owned subsidiary of Bankers Trust of New York, acquired Wintergreen from Cabot, Cabot & Forbes, and Lewis F. Payne, Jr. founded Wintergreen Development, Inc. to operate the resort and serve as the developer and managing agent.

Within a year, the resort received summer vacationers and residents with the completion of the Ellis Maples-designed Devils Knob golf course (June 1977) and the opening of the mountain tennis center (June 1978). In January 1978, Wintergreen hosted its first Winter Special Olympics. There was also an ongoing flora transplantation projectto save native plant species and incorporate them in the resort's landscaping.

The Mountain Inn and Conference Center was completed in December 1980. At that time the resort was owned and managed by Wintergreen Partners, Inc., (being separate and apart from the Wintergreen Property Owners Association). WPI began hosting conferences and meetings, expanding the resort's initial target market.

=== Present ===
In 2012, Wintergreen Resort was purchased for $16.5 million by James C. Justice II, owner of The Greenbrier Resort in White Sulfur Springs, West Virginia. Following the acquisition, Justice began several construction projects valued at a total of $12 million, including restaurant upgrades, a multimillion-dollar water tank and new snow guns to facilitate the resort's 100% snowmaking coverage, as well as improvements to existing recreational facilities.

Three years later, in February 2015, the property was sold to EPR Properties of Missouri, a REIT, without public disclosure of financial terms. As part of the sale, the resort was renamed "Wintergreen Pacific LLC," continued to do business as Wintergreen Resort and was operated by Pacific Group Resorts, Inc., under a long-term lease. Pacific Group Resorts, Inc. obtained ownership in 2021.

== Amenities ==
- 45 holes of golf
- seasonal skiing/snowboarding, and also snowtubing with a length of 900-foot (270 m)
- 22 tennis courts with an award-winning academy
- a full-service spa
- 40,000 square feet (4,000 m^{2}) of meeting and event space
- lodging
- three full-service, dine-in restaurants
- multiple convenience stores and cafeterias

== Resort configuration ==
=== Elevation ===
- Base: 2,512 ft (766 m)
- Summit: 3,515 ft (1,071 m)
- Vertical rise: 1,003 ft (306 m)

=== Trails ===
- Skiable area: 129 acres (52 ha)
- Trails: 26 total (23% beginner, 35% intermediate, 42% advanced/expert)
- Longest run: Tyro - 1.4 mi (2.3 km)
- Average annual snowfall: 35 in (890 mm)
- Terrain Parks: 1

=== Chairlifts ===
- 5 total
  - 2 high-speed (detachable) six packs
    - Blue Ridge Express
    - Highlands Express
  - 1 fixed grip quad
    - Big Acorn
  - 1 triple chairlift
    - Logger's Alley
  - 1 double chairlift
    - Potato Patch

== Weather ==
Most of the resort and surrounding mountaintop attractions range from 2,500 to 4,000 feet in elevation and therefore average considerably cooler than the nearby Valley or Piedmont cities such as Staunton, Charlottesville, and Lynchburg. Temperatures on average fall about 4 °F for every thousand feet of elevation making Wintergreen's summit typically 10-15 degrees colder than the valley towns. This allows for ample winter snowmaking and increased natural snowfall. However, due to its location well east of the highest ridge of the Appalachians, it receives only about 35 inches a year of natural snow versus some 175 inches in prime spots 100 miles (161 km) to the west. Despite lack of heavy, consistent snowfall, Wintergreen is much closer and more convenient to the major population centers on the east coast, such as Washington, D.C. and Richmond.

== Related links ==
- Blue Ridge Parkway
- Shenandoah National Park
