= Rock Cliff =

- U.S. National Register of Historic Places
- U.S. Historic district
- Virginia Landmarks Register
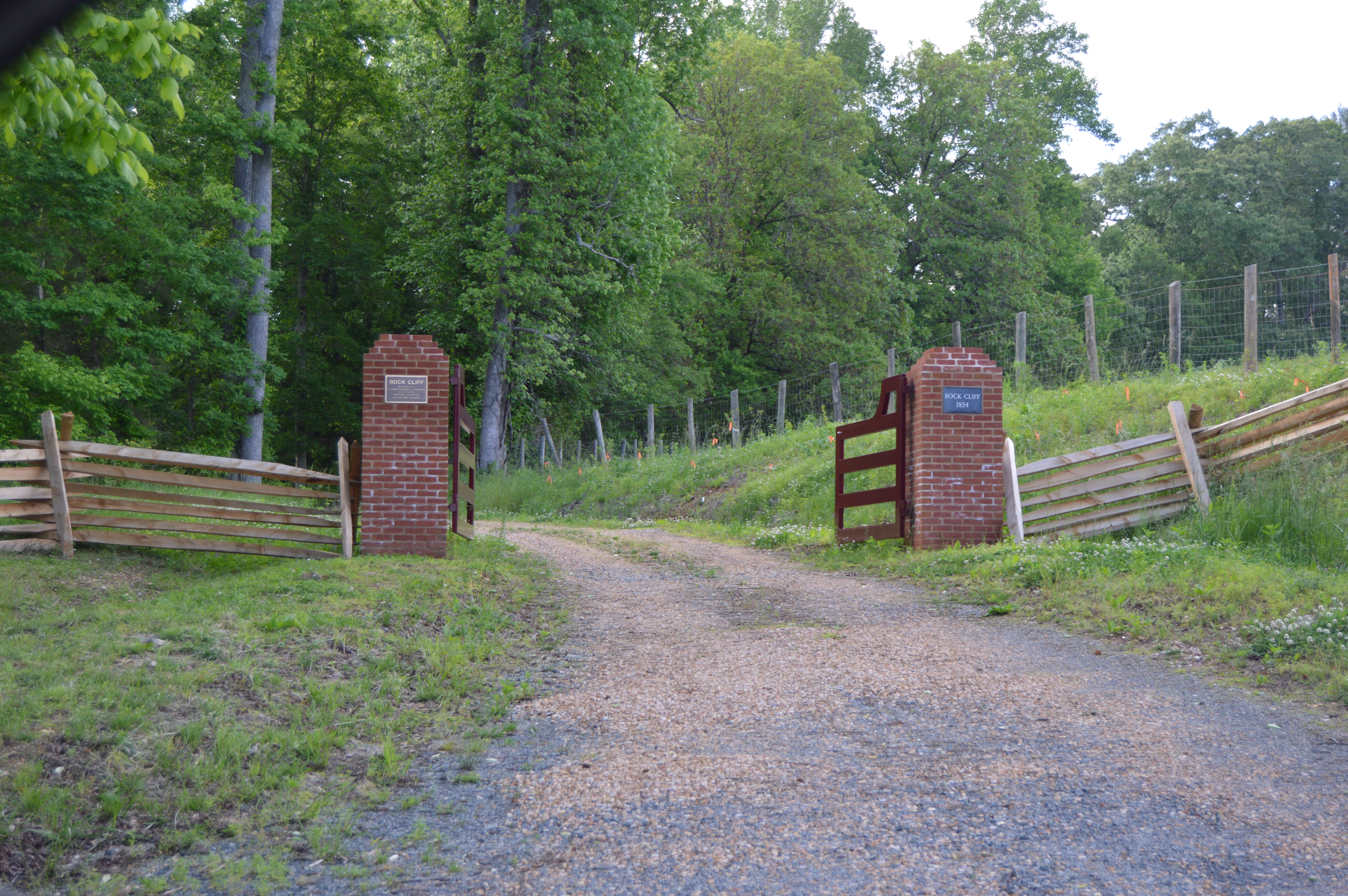
- Entrance to the property

- Location within Virginia Location within the United States
- Location: 12615 Norwood Rd., Wingina, Virginia
- Coordinates: 37°38′27″N 78°45′3″W
- Area: 692 acres (280 ha)
- Built: 1825; 201 years ago
- Architectural style: Federal
- NRHP reference No.: 15000927
- VLR No.: 062-0438

Significant dates
- Added to NRHP: December 22, 2015
- Designated VLR: September 17, 2015

Rock Cliff is a historic farm property at 12615 Norwood Road, near Wingina in Nelson County, Virginia. It consists of 692 acres (280 ha), roughly bounded by Norwood Road on the south, James River Road on the east, and Union Hill Road on the north. The property was developed beginning in 1854, the year the main house, a wood frame I-house, was built. It was developed by Dr. William Horsley, divided amongst his five children, and then reassembled by his grandson. The farm complex also includes a 19th-century smokehouse, kitchen, and doctor's office, as well as the c. 1860 Horsley family cemetery.

The farm was listed on the National Register of Historic Places in 2015.

== See also ==
- National Register of Historic Places listings in Nelson County, Virginia
