= Soldier's Joy =

Soldier's Joy may refer to:

- Morphine in archaic slang of the 1800s
- Soldier's Joy (fiddle tune), a well-known Scottish and American musical piece
- Soldier's Joy (house), a historic home in Nelson County, Virginia
