= Riverside Farm =

Riverside Farm may refer to:

- Riverside Farm (Erwinna, Pennsylvania), listed on the National Register of Historic Places in Bucks County, Pennsylvania
- River Side Farmhouse, Shelbyville, Tennessee, listed on the National Register of Historic Places in Bedford County, Tennessee
- Riverside Farm (Walter Hill, Tennessee), listed on the National Register of Historic Places in Rutherford County, Tennessee
- Riverside Farm (Nelson County, Virginia), a historic farm complex
