= Soldier's Joy (house) =

Historic house in Virginia, United States

- U.S. National Register of Historic Places
- Virginia Landmarks Register
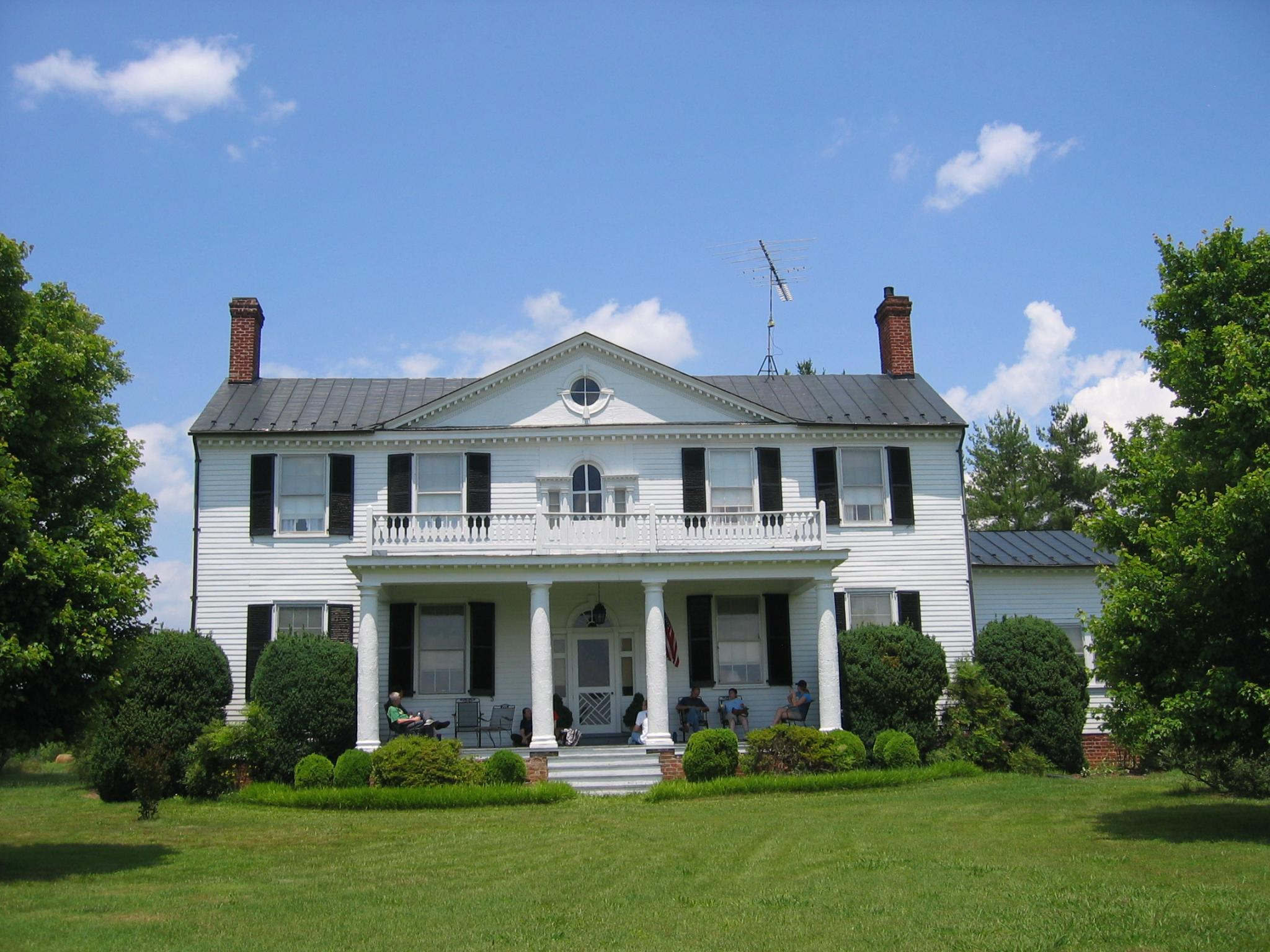
- Soldier's Joy, May 2009

- Location within Virginia Location within the United States
- Interactive map showing the location of Soldier’s Joy
- Location: SE of Shipman on State Route 626, near Wingina, Virginia
- Coordinates: 37°38′28″N 78°43′55″W
- Built: 1783
- Architect: James Robards
- Architectural style: Georgian
- NRHP reference No.: 80004204
- VLR No.: 062-0015

Significant dates
- Added to NRHP: November 28, 1980
- Designated VLR: April 15, 1980

Soldier's Joy is a historic house located at Wingina, Nelson County, Virginia, USA. It was built in 1784–85 by Col. Samuel Jordan Cabell and enlarged approximately twenty-five years later. Along with Bon Aire and Montezuma, it is one of the few remaining Cabell family houses in Nelson County. When constructed it was a five-part Palladian house; reduced in size during the 20th century when the early 19th-century wings were moved. The Late-Georgian dwelling is distinguished by its fine proportions and interior detailing, much of which was added when the house was enlarged. The elaborate woodwork from the ballroom wing was removed to the Cincinnati Art Museum when the house was renovated in the 1920s.

It was listed on the National Register of Historic Places in 1980.
