= Margaret Cabell Self =

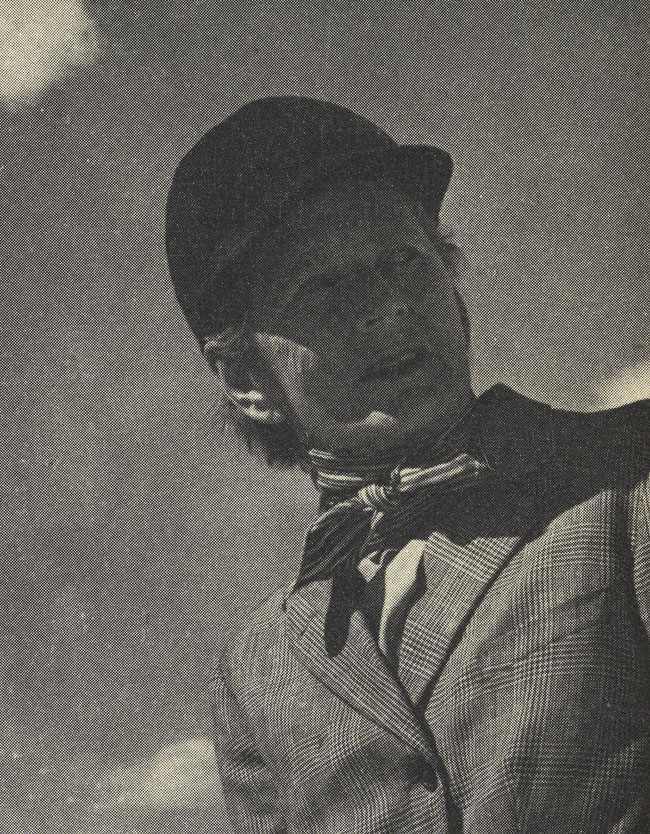
- Margaret Cabell Self
- Born: Margaret Logan Cabell; 1902
- Died: 1996 (aged 93–94)
- Occupations: Writer, riding instructor
- Notable work: The Horseman's Encyclopedia, 1946

Margaret Cabell Self (1902–1996) was an American riding instructor and writer on horsemanship. Born into the Cabell family, notable in Virginia history, Self turned to writing and teaching in order to keep her horses during the Great Depression and made her own mark as one of the Cabell family's most prominent members of the 20th century. She founded the New Canaan Mounted Troop to educate children about horses and horsemanship, and wrote over 40 books.

== Early years ==
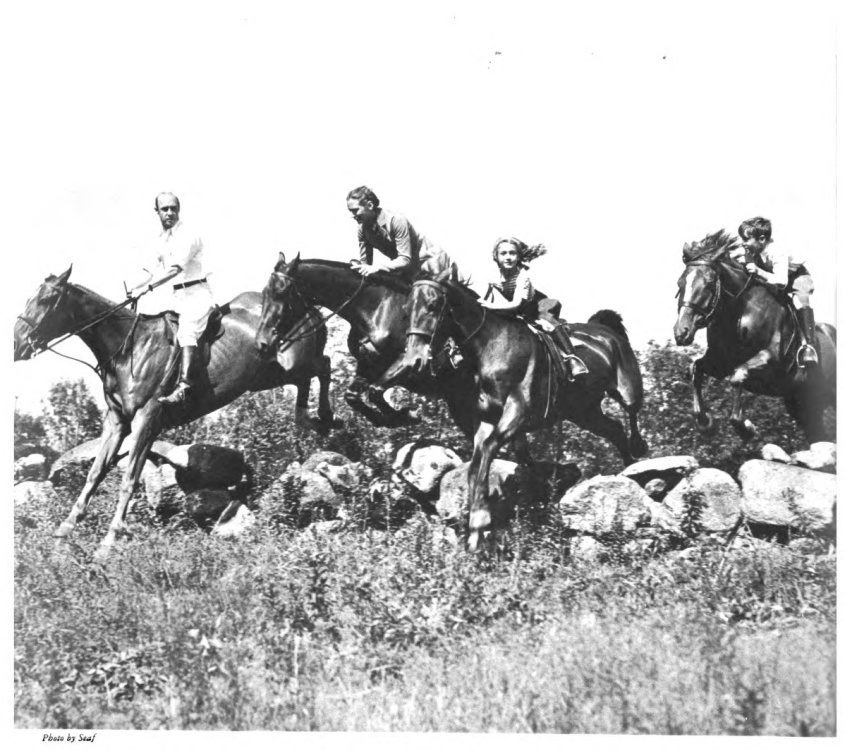
Self's husband Sydney and three of their children, circa 1935

Self was born Margaret Logan Cabell in 1902 in Cincinnati, Ohio, and grew up in Warminster, Virginia, in Nelson County. The Cabell family was a large and historically influential political family that made significant contributions to Virginia.

The Warminster area is described as "Cabell Country" by multiple sources. The Cabell family's presence in Virginia traces to 1723, when the first William Cabell, a doctor from Warminster, in England, arrived in America. He founded Warminster, Virginia about 1742, and his descendants formed a corporation in 1957 to maintain family graveyards and memorials. The "Cabell Country" area extends to Cabell County, West Virginia, named after Virginia governor William H. Cabell. The Cabells had a wide and remarkable impact on several counties in this area that are referred to collectively as "Cabell Country". There is a rich history of Cabell County, West Virginia. Apparently, starting in 1669, several Cabells settled this part of colonial Virginia, until full settlement of what today is Huntington, West Virginia. This culminated with the creation of Cabell County by an act of the Virginia General Assembly on January 2, 1809. Since these areas encompass more than one county, and county lines changed, as well as the creation the state of West Virginia, the present day term Cabell Country is used to refer to all land settled by Cabells. The name "Margaret" was carried by a number of women throughout the history of the Cabell family.

Self's nickname was "Nonie". She wrote that she learned to ride before she could walk, and was a skilled rider by the time she reached her teens. She went to college in New York City at the Women's School of Applied Design from 1917 to 1919 and the Parsons School of Design in 1921. She married Sydney Baldwin Self (1896–1980) in 1921. He had been her brother's college roommate, and the couple met while she was living in New York.

Sydney and Margaret Self had four children, Sydney "Skip" Baldwin Self Jr., Shirley "Lee" Self Brotherhood, Hartwell "Toby" Cabell Self, and Virginia "Gincy" Logan Self Bucklin. Self began to teach each child how to ride as they turned two years old. Gincy Self Bucklin became a professional horsewoman and writer on horsemanship in her own right.

Cabell was described as a "veritable Doctor Doolittle" by George Morris, as she kept many animals. When Morris was a child, riding in her New Caanan Mounted Troop, he witnessed that the family chickens were allowed to wander into the kitchen.

== Career ==
Self made her own mark as one of the more prominent members of her birth family in the 20th century along with writer James Branch Cabell. After marriage, the Selfs moved to New Canaan, Connecticut, in 1923 and lived on Point o' Forks Farm, where Margaret re-established her work with horses. She opened a public stable in 1929, where she began to teach riding lessons as a professional. When she became concerned that she might not be able to afford to keep her horses during the Great Depression, she also began to write books about horses. Her first nonfiction book was Teaching the Young to Ride, published in 1935. Her first published novel was Red Clay Country, released in 1936. In 1946, she published the commercially successful The Horseman's Encyclopedia, which brought her significant publicity. Self also taught horsemanship clinics. She authored over 40 books, most of them about horses, and wrote a column for the Pittsburgh Press.

=== New Canaan Mounted Troop ===
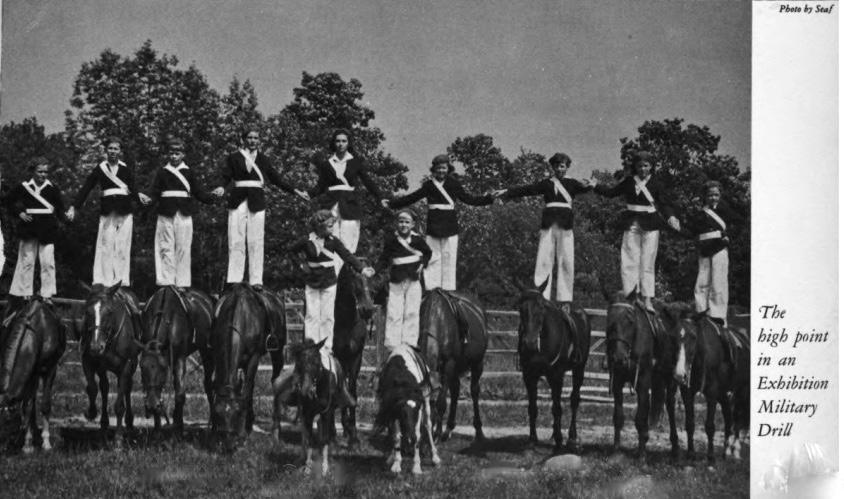
Drill team of riders

Self founded the New Canaan Mounted Troop in 1939, part of the Junior Cavalry of America. Open to boys and girls both, and described by some as "Scouts on horseback", the purpose of the troop was to teach children life skills as well as impart knowledge about horses and horsemanship. The children wore uniforms and not only rode horses, but also learned about grooming and other basic horse care as well as doing military exercises such as marching in figures. Among the members of the troop in its early years was future Olympian George H. Morris, who became a member in 1945 when he was seven years old. The New Canaan Mounted Troop is still in existence and is now a 501(c)(3) non-profit organization with the mission to "build leadership, responsibility and confidence in youth through sound horsemanship." As in Self's time, the program still requires children to do horse care and barn-cleaning chores as well as learning how to ride. Today the program has added equine-assisted therapy to its repertoire, conducts summer camps, and provides scholarships so children of modest means can participate.

== Retirement ==
Upon retirement, the Selfs spent winters in Mexico, and moved to Block Island, off the coast of Rhode Island, in 1962. In 1970, Self co-founded a newspaper with Dan Rattiner. The Block Island Times began with herself as the editor and Rattiner as the publisher. The audience was the summer tourist community until 1982 then it went yearly. Self edited the paper for ten years. Self continued to ride into her 80s.

Sydney Self died in 1980. Margaret lived 16 more years after her husband's death and died in 1996. There is a memorial to Sydney and Margaret in the Cabell family cemetery in Edgewood, a property on the National Register of Historic Places.

== Published works ==
Self published over 40 books in her career, including:

- Teaching the Young to Ride, Harper, 1935, enlarged edition, A. S. Barnes, 1946.
- Red Clay Country, Harper, 1936.
- Horses: Their Selection, Care and Handling, A. S. Barnes, 1943.
- Those Smith Kids, Dutton, 1944.
- Fun on Horseback, A. S. Barnes, 1945, revised edition, 1964.
- Ponies on Parade, Dutton, 1945.
- (Editor) A Treasury of Horse Stories, A. S. Barnes, 1945, reprinted, 1965.
- The Horseman's Encyclopedia, A. S. Barnes, 1946, revised edition, 1963.
- Chitter Chat Stories, Dutton, 1946.
- Come Away (novel), A. S. Barnes, 1948, reprinted, 1967.
- Riding Simplified, A. S. Barnes, 1948, 2nd edition published as Horseback Riding Simplified, Ronald, 1963.
- The Horseman's Companion, A. S. Barnes, 1949.
- Your First Pony, Nicholas Kaye, 1950.
- Horsemastership; Methods of Training the Horse and the Rider, A. S. Barnes, 1952, reprinted, Arco, 1973.
- Irish Adventure: A Fox Hunter's Holiday, A. S. Barnes, 1954, published as In Ireland with Margaret Cabell Self, 1967.
- Fun on Horseback, A. S. Barnes, 1954.
- The American Horse Show, A. S. Barnes, 1958.
- Jumping Simplified, Ronald, 1959.
- Riding with Mariles, McGraw, 1960.
- (Editor) A World of Horses, McGraw, 1961.
- The How and Why Wonder Book of Horses, Grosset, 1962.
- The Complete Book of Horses and Ponies, McGraw, 1963, reprinted, Bonanza Books, 1979.
- The Happy Year, Channel Press, 1963.
- Horses of Today: Arabian, Thoroughbred, Saddle Horse, Standardbred, Western, Pony, Duell, 1964.
- Riding, Step by Step, A. S. Barnes, 1965.
- The Shaggy Little Burro of San Miguel, Duell, 1965.
- Susan and Jane Learn to Ride, Macrae, 1965.
- The Horseman's Almanac and Handbook, F. Watts, 1965.
- At the Horse Show with Margaret Cabell Self, A. S. Barnes, 1966.
- Henrietta, Vanguard, 1966.
- The Morgan Horse in Pictures, Macrae, 1967.
- The American Quarter Horse in Pictures, Macrae, 1969.
- The Young Rider and His First Pony, A. S. Barnes, 1969.
- Sky Rocket: The Story of a Little Bay Horse, Dodd, 1970.
- (With Irving Robbin) Answers about Dogs and Horses, Grosset, 1970.
- The Hunter in Pictures, Macrae, 1972.
- How to Buy the Right Horse, Farnum, 1972.
- The Nature of the Horse, Arco, 1974.
- The Problem Horse and the Problem Horseman, Arco, 1977.
