= Haines Chapel =

Historic site in Rockbridge County, Virginia

- Haines Chapel and Cemetery
- U.S. National Register of Historic Places
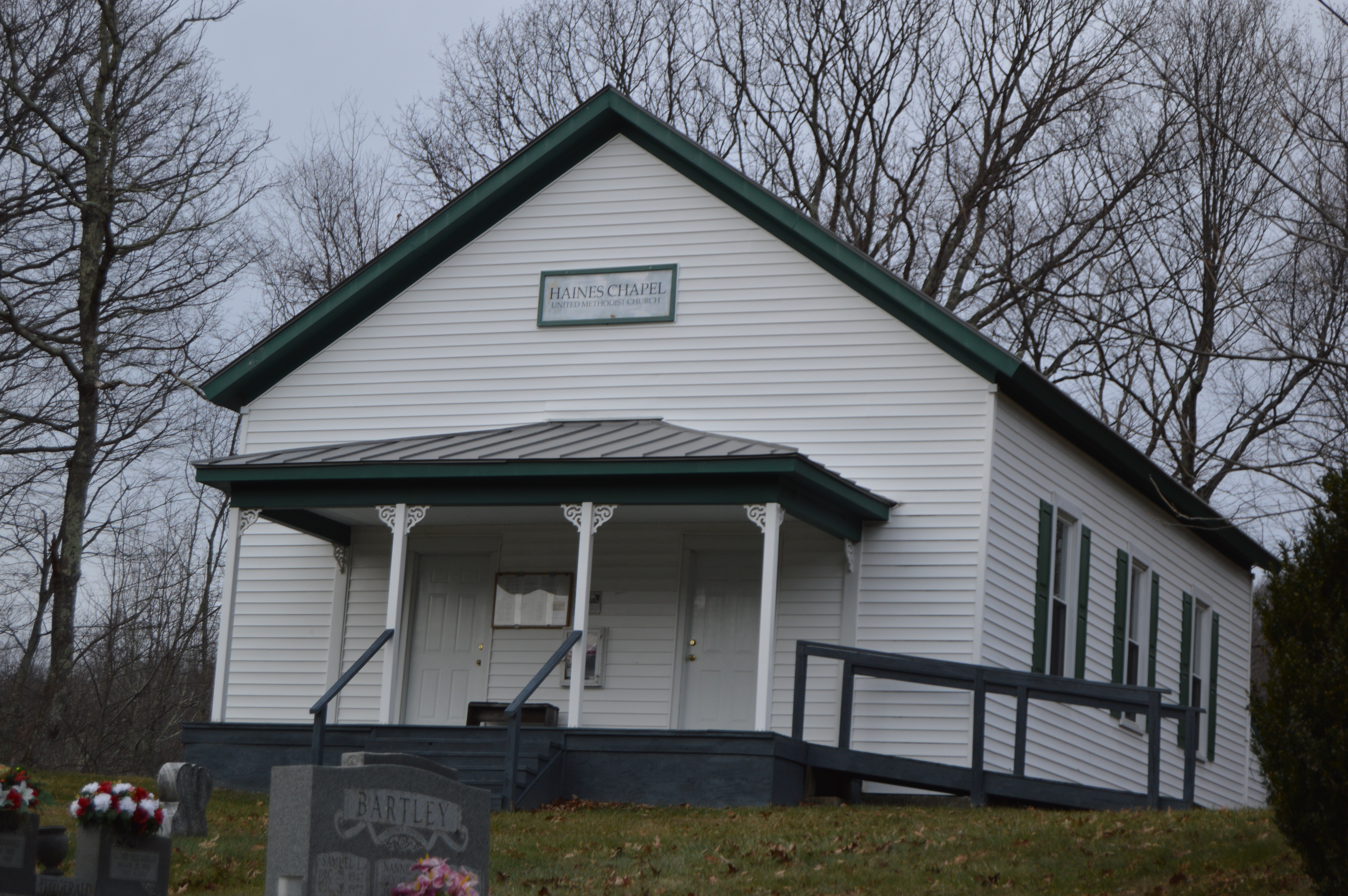
- Front and eastern side

- Location within Virginia Location within the United States
- Location: 2600 Tye River Turnpike, Vesuvius, Virginia
- Coordinates: 37°53′19″N 79°9′17″W
- Area: 2.8 acres (1.1 ha)
- Built: 1793
- NRHP reference No.: 13001174
- Added to NRHP: February 10, 2014

Haines Chapel, together with the South Mountain Cemetery, is a historic property located near the Blue Ridge Parkway in Rockbridge and Nelson Counties in the U.S. state of Virginia. The site is located just west of the parkway and north of Virginia Route 56 (Tye River Turnpike). The cemetery apparently began as a family cemetery in the 18th century; its oldest dated grave marker is a modern one dated 1793, although the oldest legible stone gives a date of 1857. The chapel, a simple wood-frame building constructed in 1914, stands on the Nelson County side of the property. Its interior contains well-preserved period woodwork, and is largely in original condition, including a period piano and organ. It is still used occasionally for services and special occasions, and the cemetery is also open to new burials.

The church and cemetery were listed on the National Register of Historic Places in 2014.

== See also ==
- National Register of Historic Places listings in Rockbridge County, Virginia
- National Register of Historic Places listings in Nelson County, Virginia
