= Schuyler, Virginia =

- CDP
- Location within Virginia Location within the United States
- Coordinates: 37°47′33″N 78°41′54″W
- Country: United States
- State: Virginia
- County: Nelson County

Area
  - Total: 1.5 sq mi (3.9 km^{2})
- Elevation: 394 ft (120 m)

Population (2020)
  - Total: 252
  - Density: 170/sq mi (65/km^{2})
- Time zone: UTC-5 (Eastern (EST))
  - Summer (DST): UTC-4 (EDT)
- Area code: 434
- GNIS feature ID: 1500039

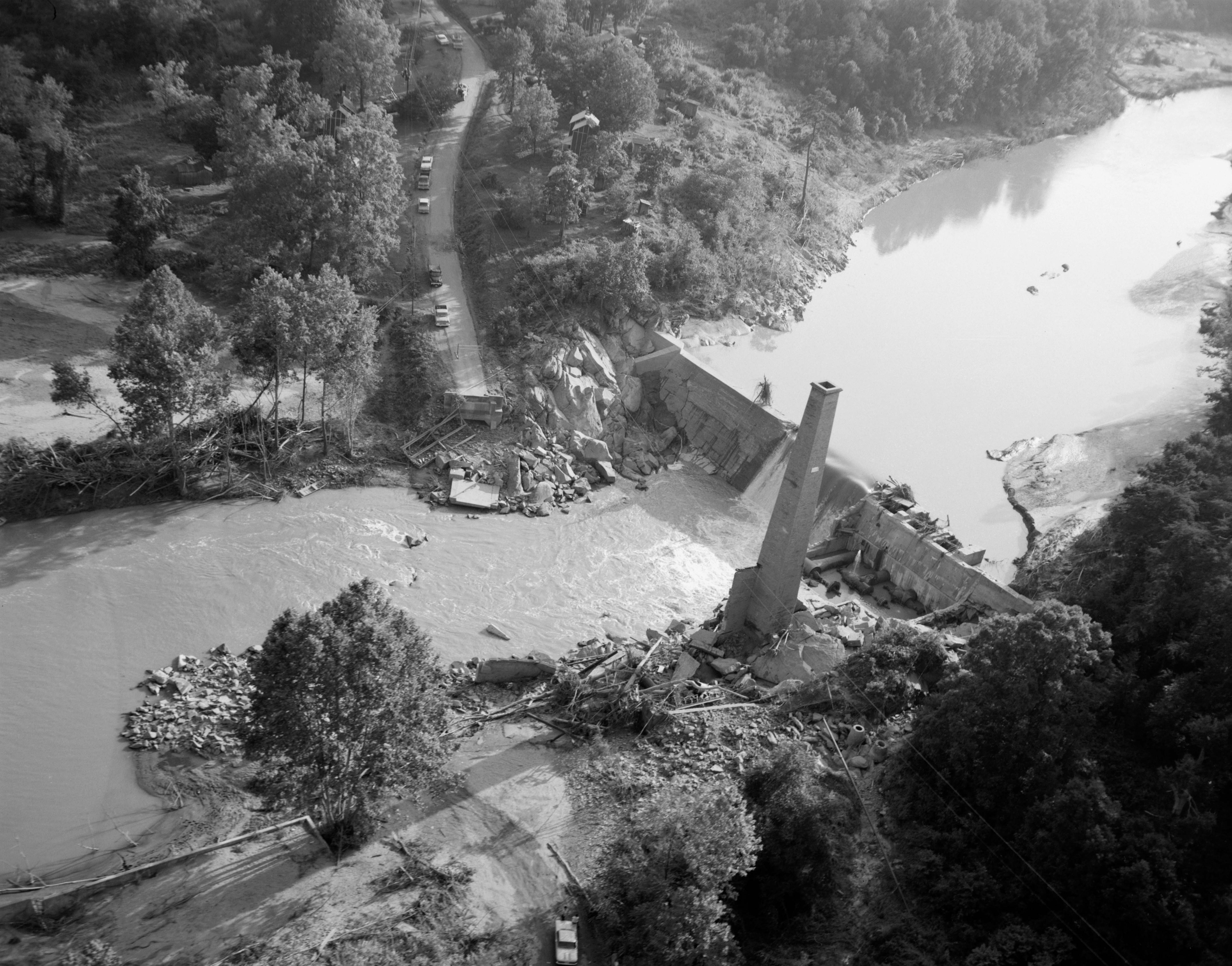
The Rockfish River at Schuyler after the passage of devastating Hurricane Camille in August 1969.

Schuyler (/ˈskaɪlər/ SKY-lur) is a census-designated place (CDP) in Nelson County, Virginia close to Scottsville and Charlottesville. The population as of the 2020 U.S. census was 252.

In 1882 the community—originally called "Walker's Mill"—was renamed for Schuyler George Walker, a local mill operator, and the area's first postmaster for the local post office branch of the old United States Post Office Department (today's United States Postal Service after 1971).

In the late 19th and early 20th centuries the community became a small industrial center with the establishment of a stone cutting plant for the area quarries of the Alberene Stone Company, which took the native and acid-resistant soapstone and cut, then milled the rock into flat slab table tops for medical labs, hospitals and high school science classrooms. The economic hardships of the Great Depression of the 1930s essentially destroyed this industry and the area never fully recovered.

Schuyler was also the birthplace and early home of screenwriter Earl Hamner Jr. (1923–2016). He is best known for the long-running Columbia Broadcasting System (CBS-TV) network's television series The Waltons, which stories and scripts were based on his experiences of growing up the eldest child of a large rural family in Great Depression-era America of the 1930s and subsequent Second World War era of the early 1940s. The TV series during the 1970s was followed by six made-for-TV reunion films aired during the following 1980s and 1990s. Earl and his mother and siblings attended the local Schuyler Baptist Church near their homestead. In 2014, a special service was held there to honor Hamner on his last visit to the Appalachian Mountains / Allegheny Mountains / Blue Ridge Mountains chain of the Western Virginia region; Hamner died two years later. Country music singer Jimmy Fortune (born 1955) of nearby Nelson County, participated in the event.

The region suffered greatly from the remnants of Hurricane Camille, which dumped 2 feet (61 cm) to 3 feet (91 cm) of rain, flooding the upper mountain creeks and streams, devastating the area in August 1969.

== Museum and historic district ==
In 1992 the Walton's Mountain Museum opened to boost the local economy by bringing in tourists who are fans of The Waltons television series.

The Schuyler Historic District was listed on the National Register of Historic Places (lists maintained by the National Park Service of the United States Department of the Interior) in 2007.

== Demographics ==
Historical population
Census	Pop.	Note	%±
2010	298		—
2020	252		−15.4%
U.S. Decennial Census; 2010 2020

Schuyler was first listed as a census designated place in the 2010 U.S. census.
