= Tyro Mill =

- U.S. National Register of Historic Places
- Virginia Landmarks Register
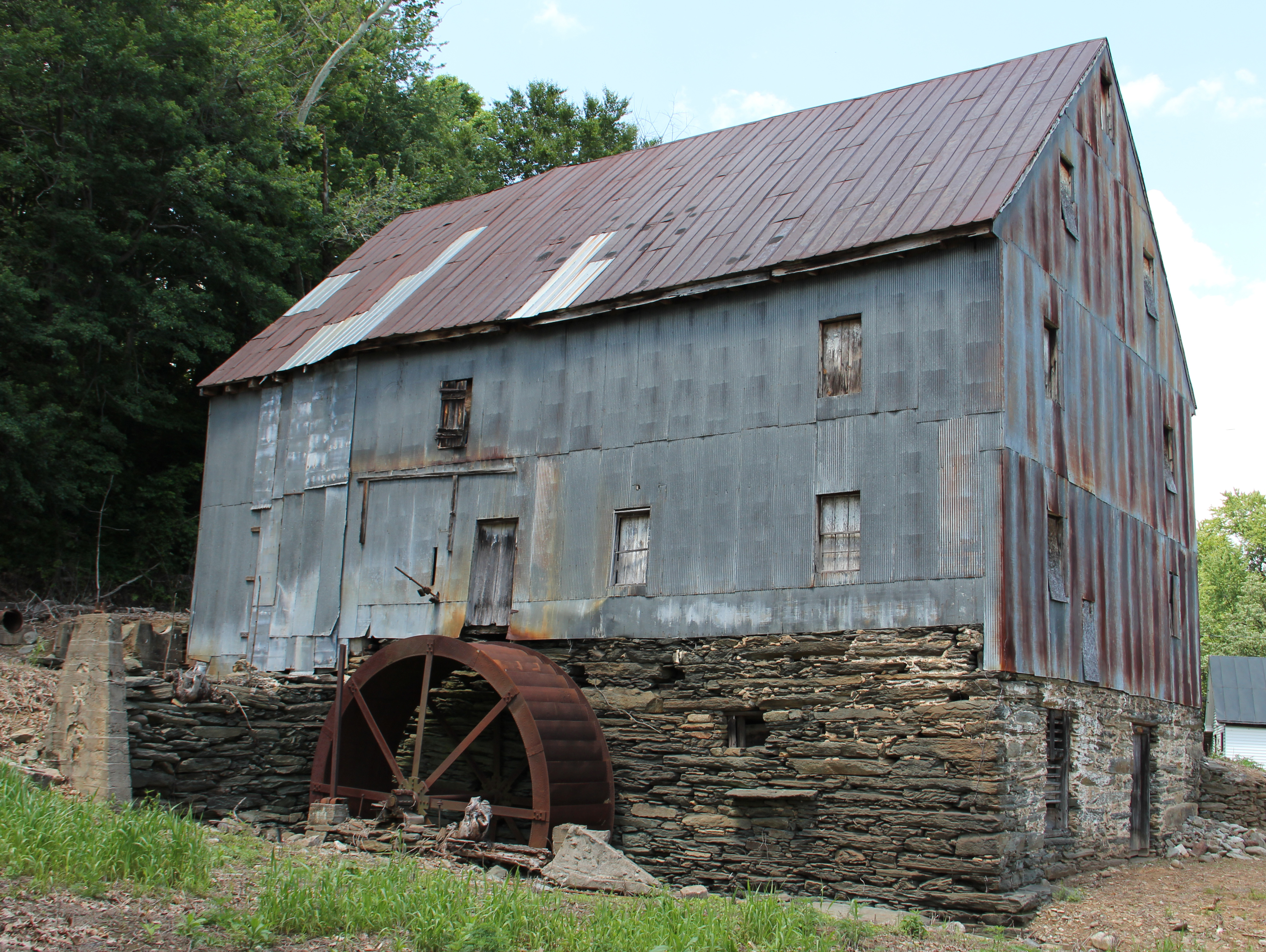

- Location within Virginia Location within the United States
- Location: VA 56 (Crabtree Falls Hwy), Tyro, Virginia
- Coordinates: 37°49′5″N 79°0′20″W
- Built: 1846
- NRHP reference No.: 06000749
- VLR No.: 062-0028

Significant dates
- Added to NRHP: August 30, 2006
- Designated VLR: June 8, 2006

Tyro Mill is a historic grist mill located at Tyro, Nelson County, Virginia. It is a multi-story frame mill built in 1846–47 with an addition made in the late nineteenth century. It has a metal-sheathed gable roof and a stone foundation. There is an overshot metal wheel in a stone wheel well and remnants of the head race. The mill contains original machinery including wood gears and drive shafts, two runs of millstones, and a husk frame in the basement gear pit. Also on the property is a mid-19th century log dwelling—traditionally identified as the miller's house—with twentieth century frame additions and front porch.

It was listed on the National Register of Historic Places in 2006.
