= Norwood, Nelson County, Virginia =

Unincorporated community in Virginia, US

Coordinates: 37°38′36″N 78°48′32″W

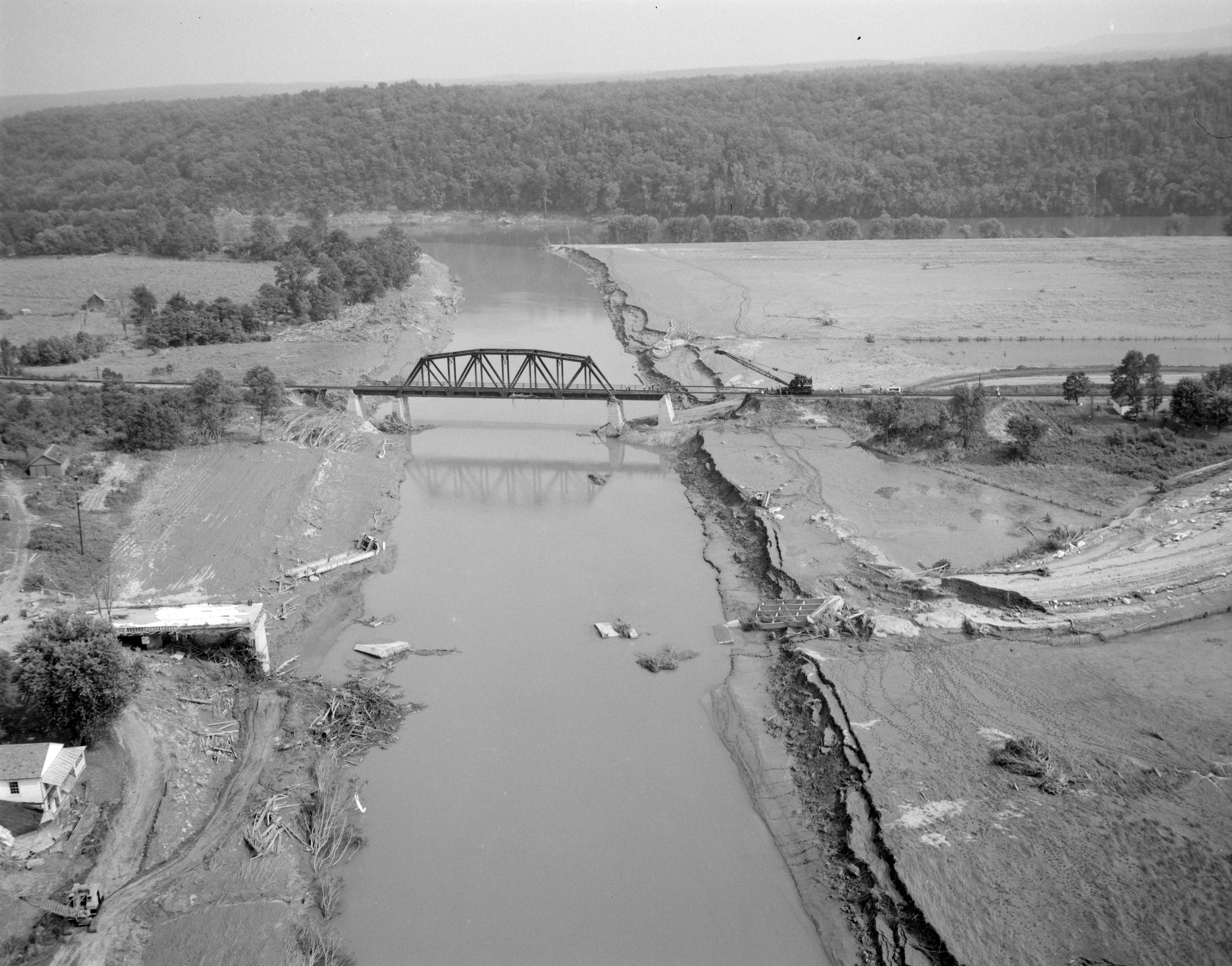
Flood damage along the Tye River near Norwood in the aftermath of Hurricane Camille

Norwood is an unincorporated community in Nelson County, Virginia, United States. It was among the communities severely affected by flash flooding from Hurricane Camille in 1969.

Montezuma was listed on the National Register of Historic Places in 1980.
