= Riverside Farm (Nelson County, Virginia) =

- U.S. National Register of Historic Places
- U.S. Historic district
- Virginia Landmarks Register
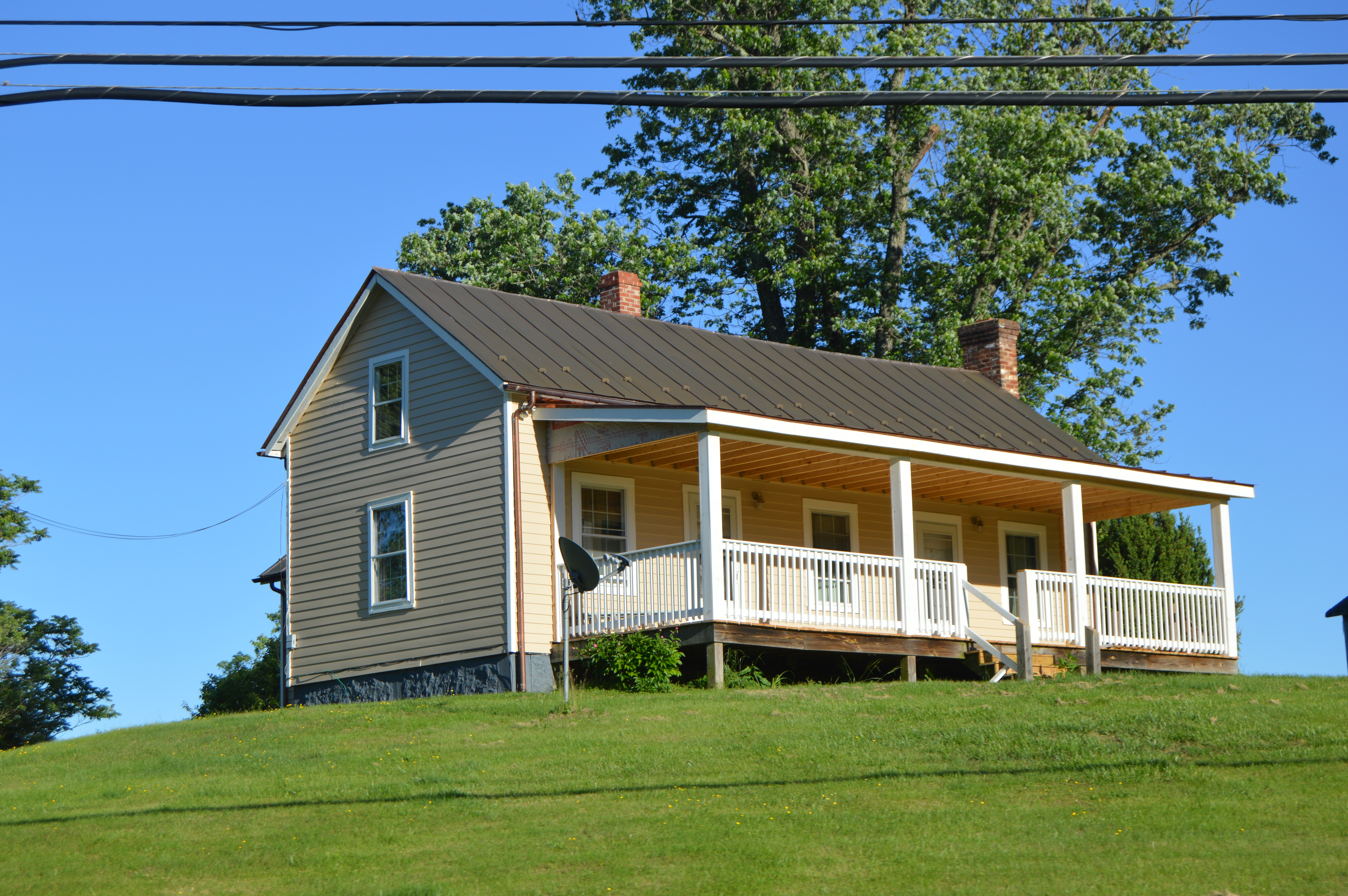
- One of the tenant houses

- Location within Virginia Location within the United States
- Location: 6840 Patrick Henry Hwy., near Roseland, Virginia
- Coordinates: 37°45′10″N 78°59′15″W
- Area: 295 acres (119 ha)
- Built: 1841
- Architectural style: Federal
- NRHP reference No.: 15001040
- VLR No.: 062-0096

Significant dates
- Added to NRHP: February 2, 2016
- Designated VLR: December 12, 2015

Riverside Farm is a historic farm complex in rural western Nelson County, Virginia. It is located on the south side of Patrick Henry Highway (Virginia State Route 151) west of Roseland, on the western shore of the Tye River. Set on 295 acres (119 ha), it has a history dating to the early-to-mid 19th century, with the main farm complex set near the center of rolling fields. The main house is an 1841 late Federal period wood-frame house, and it is surrounded by a variety of domestic and agricultural outbuildings, including an ice house, poultry house, and smokehouse, all from the 1840s. Near the road stands a secondary complex that includes a mid-19th century tenant house. Development on the farm apparently began between 1831 and 1835 by James D. Goodwin.

The farm was listed on the National Register of Historic Places in 2016.

== See also ==
- National Register of Historic Places listings in Nelson County, Virginia
