= Three Chimneys =

Historic house in Virginia, United States

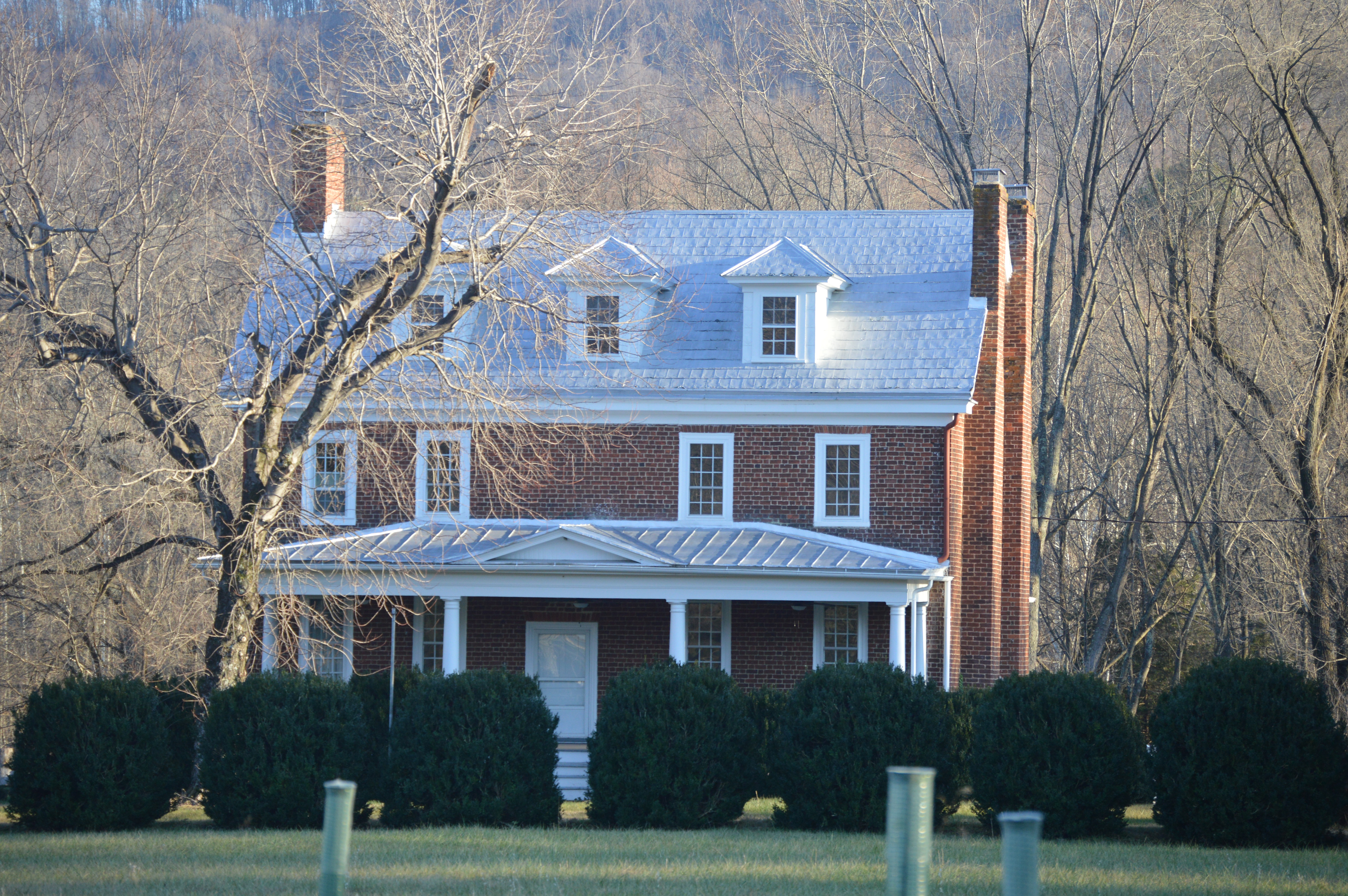
- Front of the house

- Location within Virginia
- 37.890934°N 78.869994°W
- Location: Nellysford, Virginia

History
- Built: c. 1795

Site notes
- Area: 32 acres (13 ha)
- Architectural style: late Georgian
- Governing body: private
- Owner: Daniel and Lucy Haslam

Virginia Landmarks Register
- Designated: September 2013
- Reference no.: 062-0433

Three Chimneys, also known as the Major James Woods House, is a two-and-a-half-story Georgian style historic house in Nelson County, Virginia.

Constructed approximately in 1795, the house is one of the oldest standing brick houses in Nelson County, and was added to the Virginia Landmarks Register in September 2013.
