= Shipman, Virginia =

American census-designated place in Nelson County, Virginia

Coordinates: 37°43′26″N 78°50′21″W

Shipman is a census-designated place (CDP) in Nelson County, Virginia, United States. As of the 2020 census, Shipman had a population of 492.

Bon Aire and the Oak Ridge Railroad Overpass are listed on the National Register of Historic Places.

== Demographics ==
Historical population
Census	Pop.	Note	%±
2020	492		—
U.S. Decennial Census; 2010 2020

Shipman was first listed as a census designated place in the 2010 U.S. census.
