= Tyro, Virginia =

Unincorporated community in Virginia, US

Coordinates: 37°49′18″N 79°00′17″W

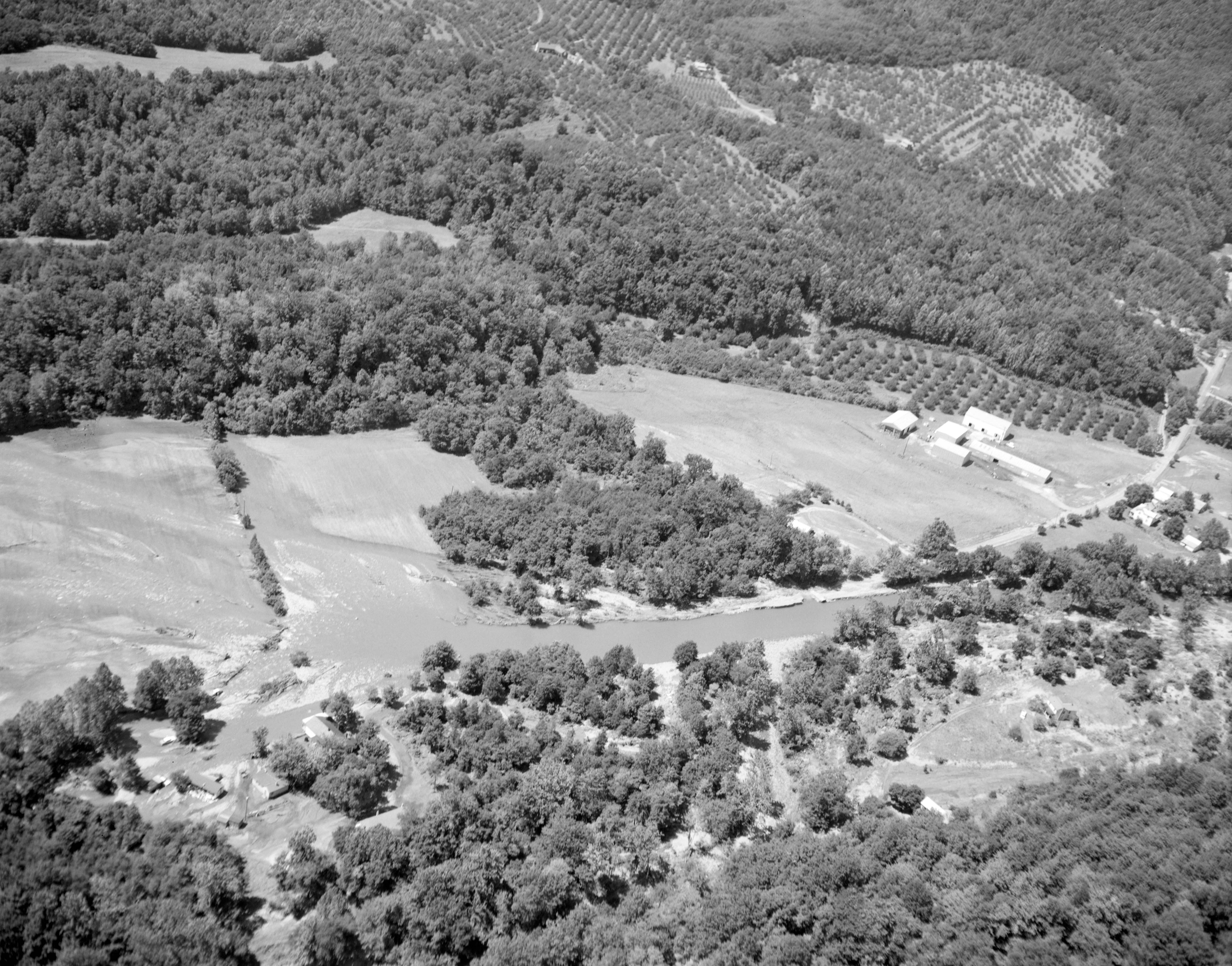
Aerial view of the Tyro area after the passage of Hurricane Camille

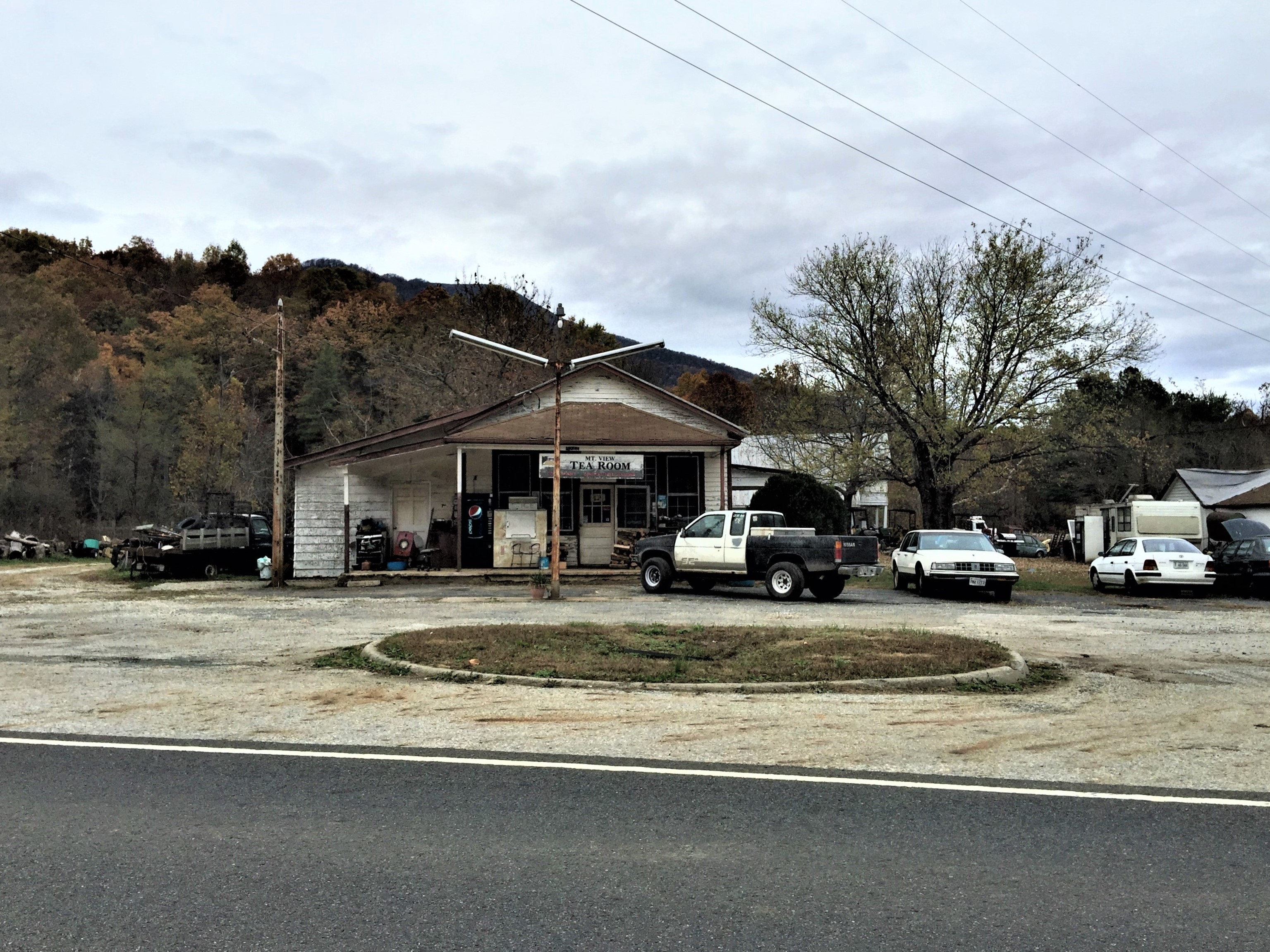
Mountain View Tea Room in Tyro

Tyro is an unincorporated community in Nelson County, Virginia, United States. It was among the communities severely affected by flash flooding from Hurricane Camille in 1969.

It was named from the English word tyro, which also means "beginner" or "novice".

Pharsalia and the Tyro Mill are listed on the National Register of Historic Places.
