= Edgewood (Wingina, Virginia) =

- U.S. National Register of Historic Places
- Virginia Landmarks Register
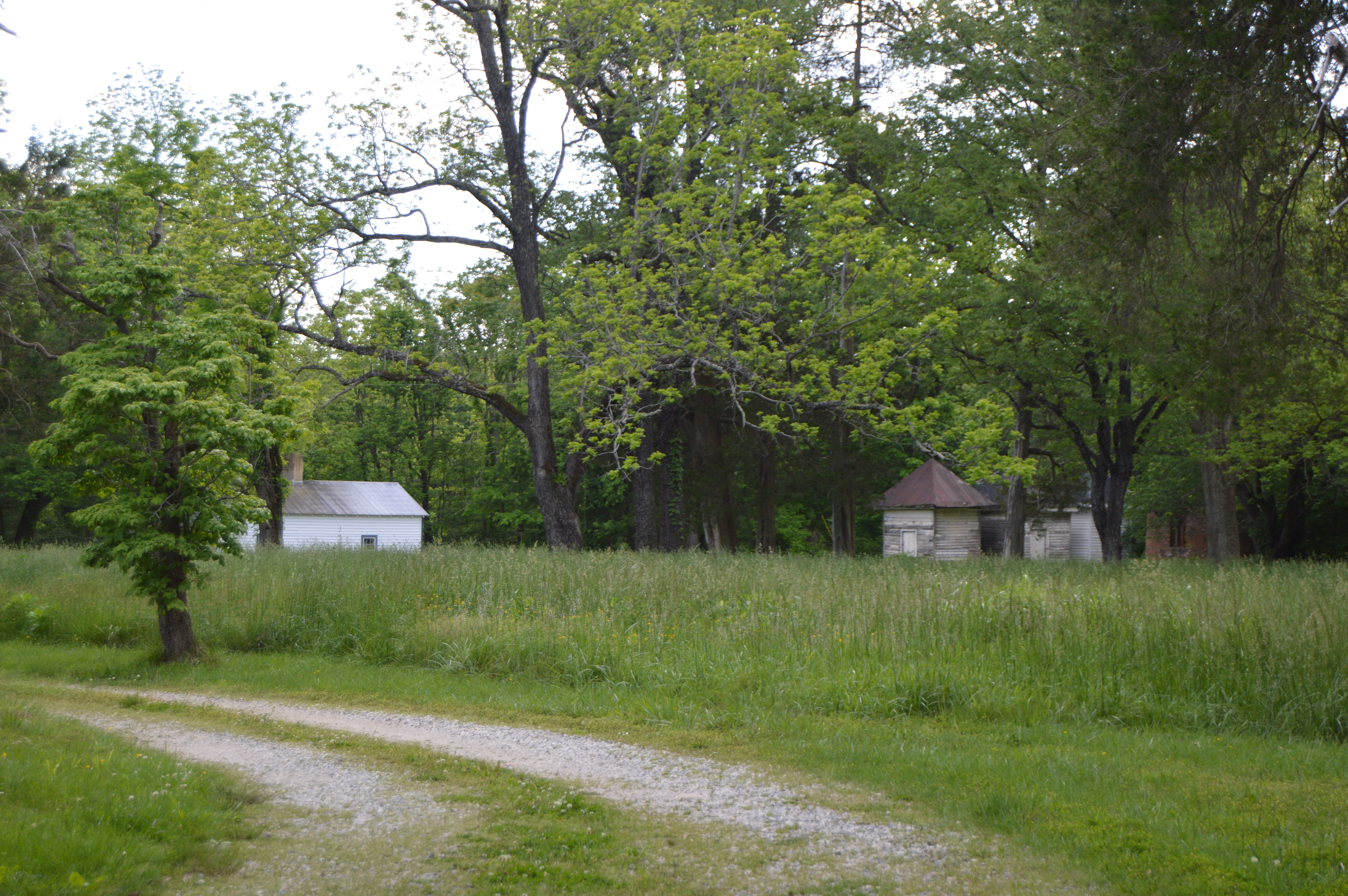
- Outbuildings at the farmstead

- Location within Virginia Location within the United States
- Location: 3008 Warminster Dr., Wingina, Virginia
- Coordinates: 37°41′17″N 78°42′28″W
- Built: 1790
- Architect: Lyman Peck, Malcolm Crawford
- Architectural style: Colonial Revival
- NRHP reference No.: 06000354
- VLR No.: 062-0004

Significant dates
- Added to NRHP: May 2, 2006
- Designated VLR: March 8, 2006

Edgewood is a historic farm complex located at Wingina, Nelson County, Virginia. Structures located on the 65-acre (260,000 m^{2}) property document its evolution as a plantation and farm since the late-18th century. It includes the main house ruins, a house built about 1790 and destroyed by fire in 1955; the circa 1820 Tucker Cottage; an 18th-century dovecote, dairy, and smokehouse; an 1828 icehouse; an early 19th-century corncrib; and a mid-19th-century barn or granary. Also on the property are a circa 1940s tenant house (now a woodworking shop) and machine shed, the Cabell family cemetery, and an original well. The structures are all located along the gravel driveway.

It was listed on the National Register of Historic Places in 2006.

== See also ==
- Margaret Cabell Self, buried at Edgewood
