= Midway Mill =

- Formerly listed on the U.S. National Register of Historic Places
- Virginia Landmarks Register
- Location: On the James River at end of VA 743, Midway Mills, Virginia
- Area: 9 acres (3.6 ha)
- Built: 1787, 1810
- Built by: Cabell, William H.
- NRHP reference No.: 73002042
- VLR No.: 062-0023

Significant dates
- Added to NRHP: 1973
- Designated VLR
- Removed from NRHP: March 19, 2001

Midway Mill was a historic grist mill located at Midway Mills, Nelson County, Virginia. It was built in 1787 by William H. Cabell (1772–1853), with minor alterations in 1810. It was a 4 1/4-story, uncoarsed ashlar stone rectangular structure with a slate gable roof. Associated with the mill were the contributing stone arch bridge and the late-19th century frame Simpson House. It once stood beside the James River and Kanawha Canal at the halfway point on the James River between Lynchburg and Richmond. It was demolished in 1998.

It was listed on the National Register of Historic Places in 1973, and delisted in 2001.
