= Elk Hill (Nellysford, Virginia) =

Historic house in Virginia, United States

- U.S. National Register of Historic Places
- Virginia Landmarks Register
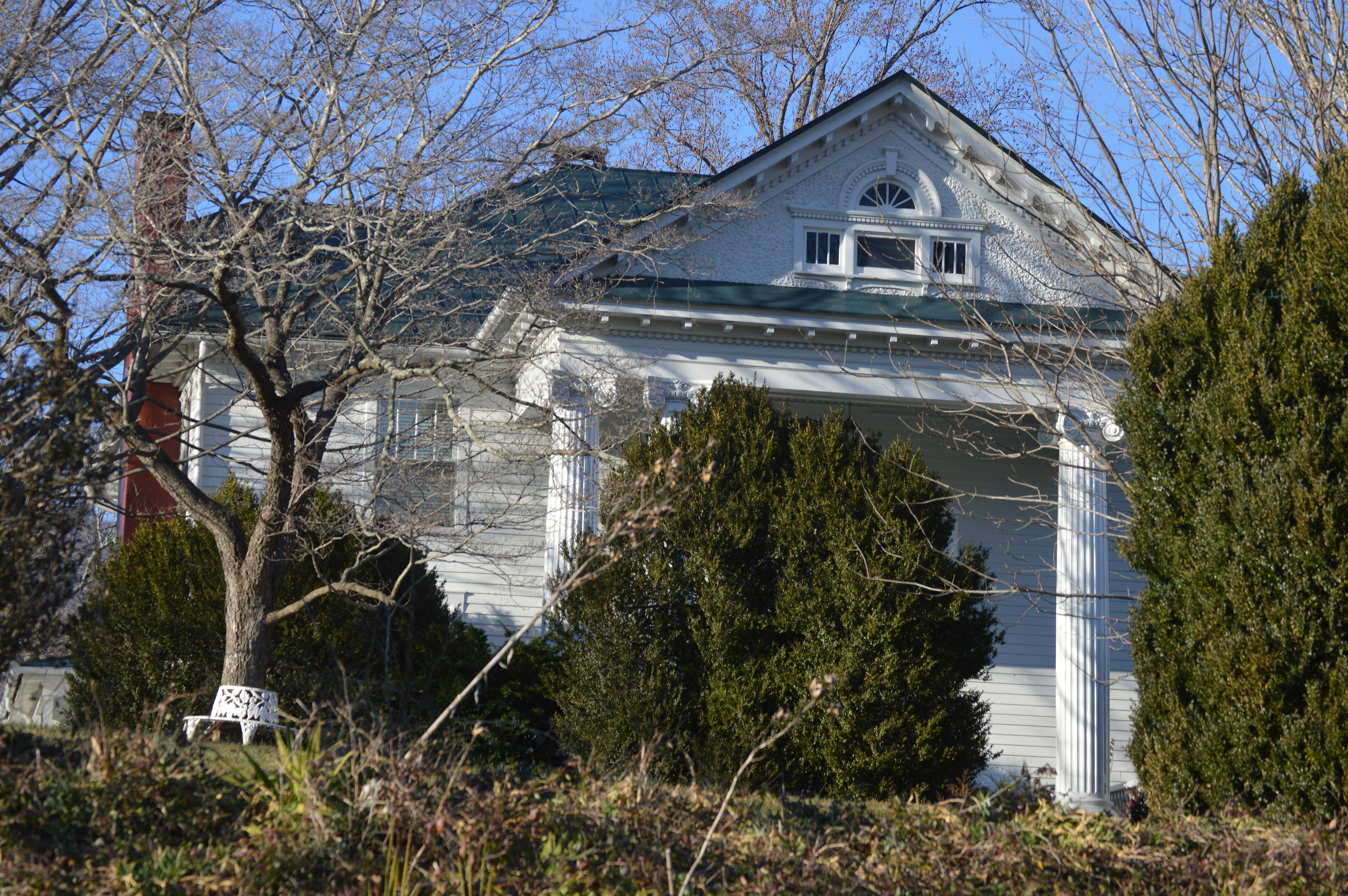
- Front of the house

- Location within Virginia Location within the United States
- Location: 511 State Route 151, near Wintergreen, Virginia
- Coordinates: 37°52′38″N 78°54′39″W
- Built: 1749
- Architectural style: Classical Revival, Greek Revival
- NRHP reference No.: 07000220
- VLR No.: 062-0005

Significant dates
- Added to NRHP: March 27, 2007
- Designated VLR: December 6, 2006

Elk Hill is a historic house and farm complex located near Nellysford, Nelson County, Virginia. Operated for more than 250 years, it is one of the earliest extant farms in Nelson County. The 173-acre (0.70 km^{2}) rural farm bounded in part by the South Fork of the Rockfish River and Reid's Creek. The main house is a substantial two-story, three-bay wide frame dwelling with a central hall plan, with the original portion built between 1790 and 1810. Since Samuel Reid sold the farm in 1805 to Hawes Coleman, whose descendants owned it until 1977, it is unclear which family constructed the current house, particularly since the property contained the ruins of a smaller structure that was occupied into the 20th century. The house underwent a series of 19th-century additions and a major remodeling in 1902 in the neoclassical style. The property includes structures showing the succession of major crops in the area, from tobacco in the 18th and 19th centuries, to apples in the early 20th centuries. The current owner began a vineyard and winery late in the 20th century, partly on land once operated as High View Farm (ca. 1830s), as well as issued in 2005 a conservation easement to the Virginia Outdoors Foundation to protect its natural habitat and rural character. The contributing outbuildings include: smokehouse, built in the last quarter of the 18th century; tobacco barn, built circa 1790–1810; 19th century chicken house, two seat outhouse, and double crib barn; garages built in 1902 and in 1955; and a stone boundary/retaining wall, built in the last quarter of the 18th century.

It was listed on the National Register of Historic Places in 2007.
