= Schuyler Historic District =

Historic district in Virginia, United States

- U.S. National Register of Historic Places
- U.S. Historic district
- Virginia Landmarks Register
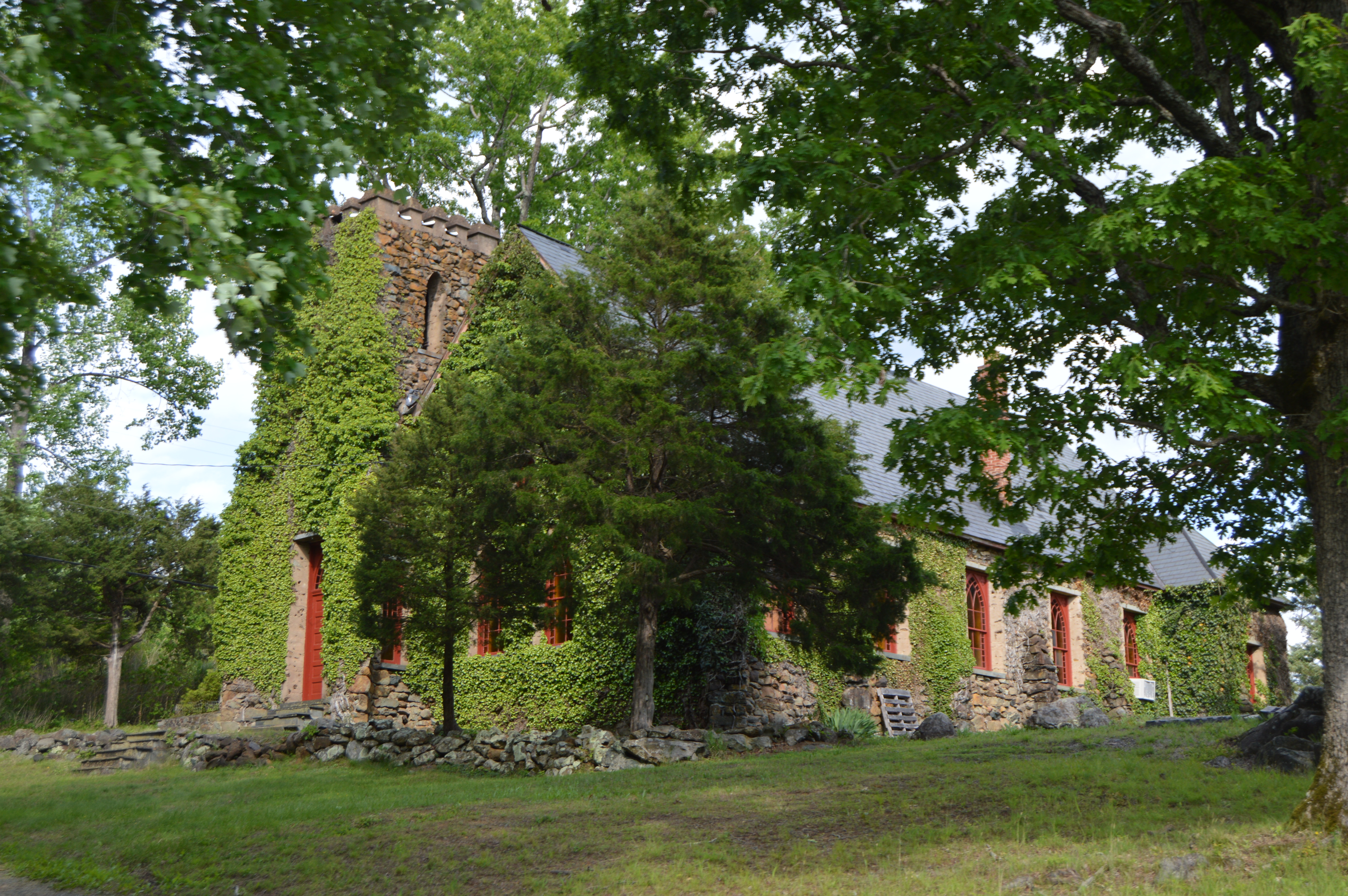
- The former Schuyler Christ Episcopal Church

- Location within Virginia Location within the United States
- Location: Crossroads of Schuyler Rd., Salem Rd. and Rockfish River Rd., Schuyler, Virginia
- Coordinates: 37°47′33″N 78°41′54″W
- Architect: Andrew Bruce
- Architectural style: Queen Anne, Italianate
- NRHP reference No.: 07000195
- VLR No.: 062-5002

Significant dates
- Added to NRHP: March 21, 2007
- Designated VLR: June 8, 2006

The Schuyler Historic District is a national historic district located in Schuyler, Virginia. It comprises 563.9 acres (2.282 km^{2}) and includes 138 primary resources dating from its settlement period of the 1840s through the mid-20th century. A primary component are eight soapstone quarries located in Schuyler, with eight additional located just over the Albemarle County line. It represents a cohesive industrial community with the majority of its dwellings representative of vernacular regional building traditions. There is an "Executive Row" of dwellings overlooked the centrally located soapstone company from atop a bluff, with other quarry focused neighborhoods fanned out along adjacent hilltops.

One of the older churches in the area is Schuyler Baptist Church organized in 1905. The cornerstone for the present building was laid on August 17, 1907 at 2:00 PM by Rockfish Lodge Number 108 A. F. and A. M. It was listed on the National Register of Historic Places in 2007.
