= Midway Mills, Virginia =

Unincorporated community in Virginia, US

Coordinates: 37°39′58″N 78°43′20″W

Midway Mills is an unincorporated community in Nelson County, Virginia, United States. Originally called Midway, the settlement was established on June 6, 1774, by Dr. William Cabell, (born 1699), and was the first European settlement in Nelson County. It was named Midway because it was midway between Richmond and Lynchburg along the James River. The area, at that time part of "Old Albemarle County", was later divided into the counties of Albemarle, Amherst, Buckingham, Nelson, and Fluvanna between 1741 and 1809.

Dr. William Cabell owned many slaves, which were inherited by his children and grandchildren. One great-grandchild, Nathaniel Francis Cabell, (born 1807) documented names of slaves in correspondence and writings, which is kept at the Special Collections Library at the University of Virginia in Charlottesville. His list of slave families living at Edgewood, Warminster, Union Hill, and Liberty Hall includes the Nicholas, Diggs, Venable, Woodson, Mayo, Early, Tompkins, Beverly, Horsley, Tucker, Rose, and Rives families.

It was the site of Midway Mill, constructed in 1787, by William H. Cabell and demolished in 1998.
