= Wintergreen Country Store =

Historic commercial building in Virginia, United States

- U.S. National Register of Historic Places
- Virginia Landmarks Register
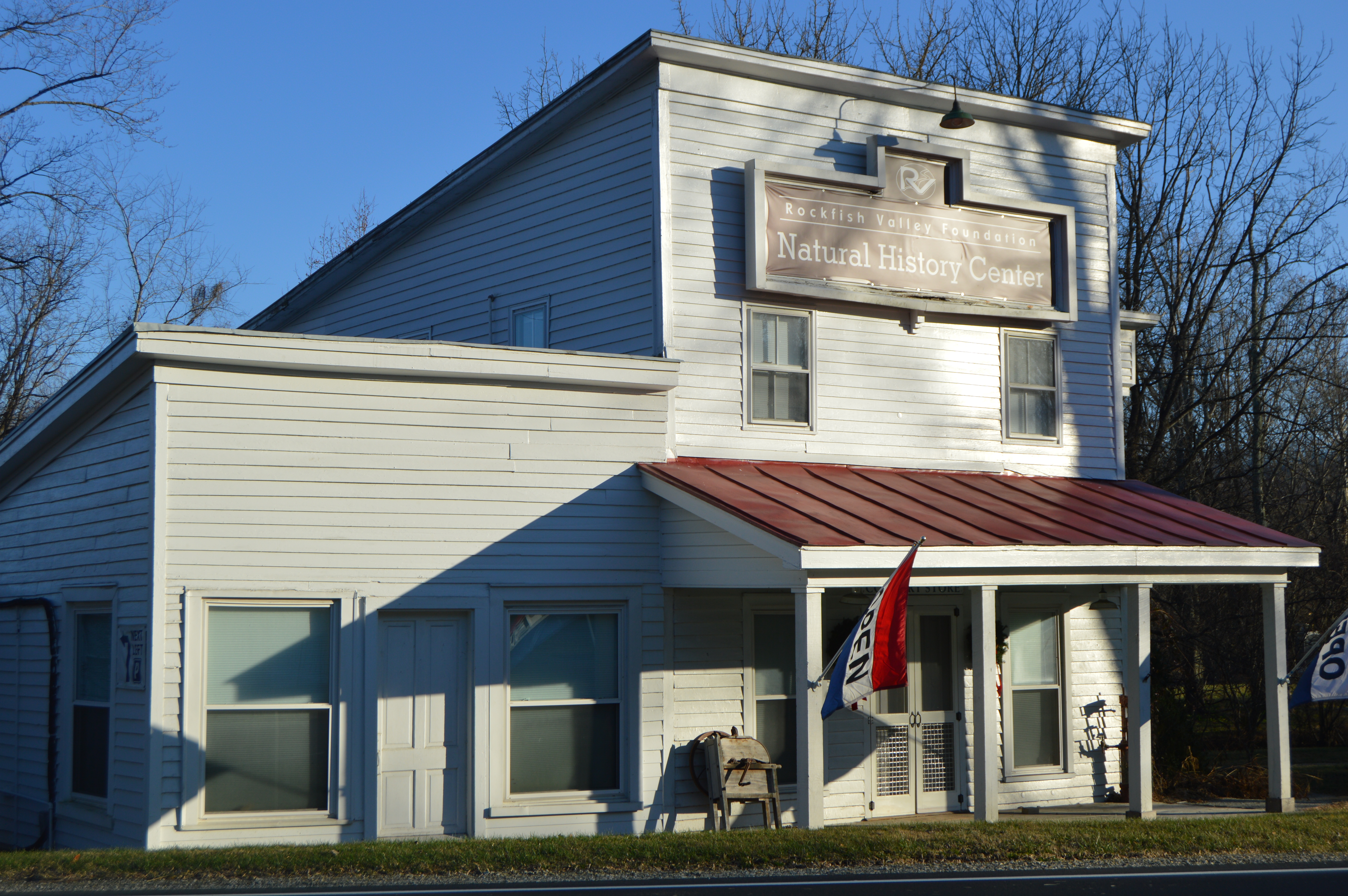
- Front of the store

- Location within Virginia Location within the United States
- Location: 1368 State Route 151 at Wintergreen, Virginia
- Coordinates: 37°53′6″N 78°53′56″W
- Built: 1908
- Architect: Grover C. Harris
- Architectural style: Early Commercial
- NRHP reference No.: 05001233
- VLR No.: 062-0117

Significant dates
- Added to NRHP: November 9, 2005
- Designated VLR: September 14, 2005

The Wintergreen Country Store is a historic building built originally as a country store located near Nellysford, Nelson County, Virginia. It is a one- and two-story, shed roofed, frame vernacular building with weatherboard siding on a masonry and concrete foundation. The store was built in four phases: the original store was a one-story, one-room building with a porch, built between 1908 and 1909; the second was living space added in the late 1920s; the third phase added a two-story section with a two-story porch; and the fourth phase was added by Wintergreen Ski Resort as a welcoming center when it first opened in 1975.

After closing as an office and gift shop for the Wintergreen resort, the building was used as a meeting place for Peace in the Valley, an Episcopal Church mission. Thereafter it served as a gallery featuring local artists. It now serves as the Rockfish Valley Foundation Natural History Center and is affiliated with the Virginia Museum of Natural History.

It was listed on the National Register of Historic Places in 2005.
