= Wintergreen, Virginia =

Coordinates: 37°53′6″N 78°53′58″W

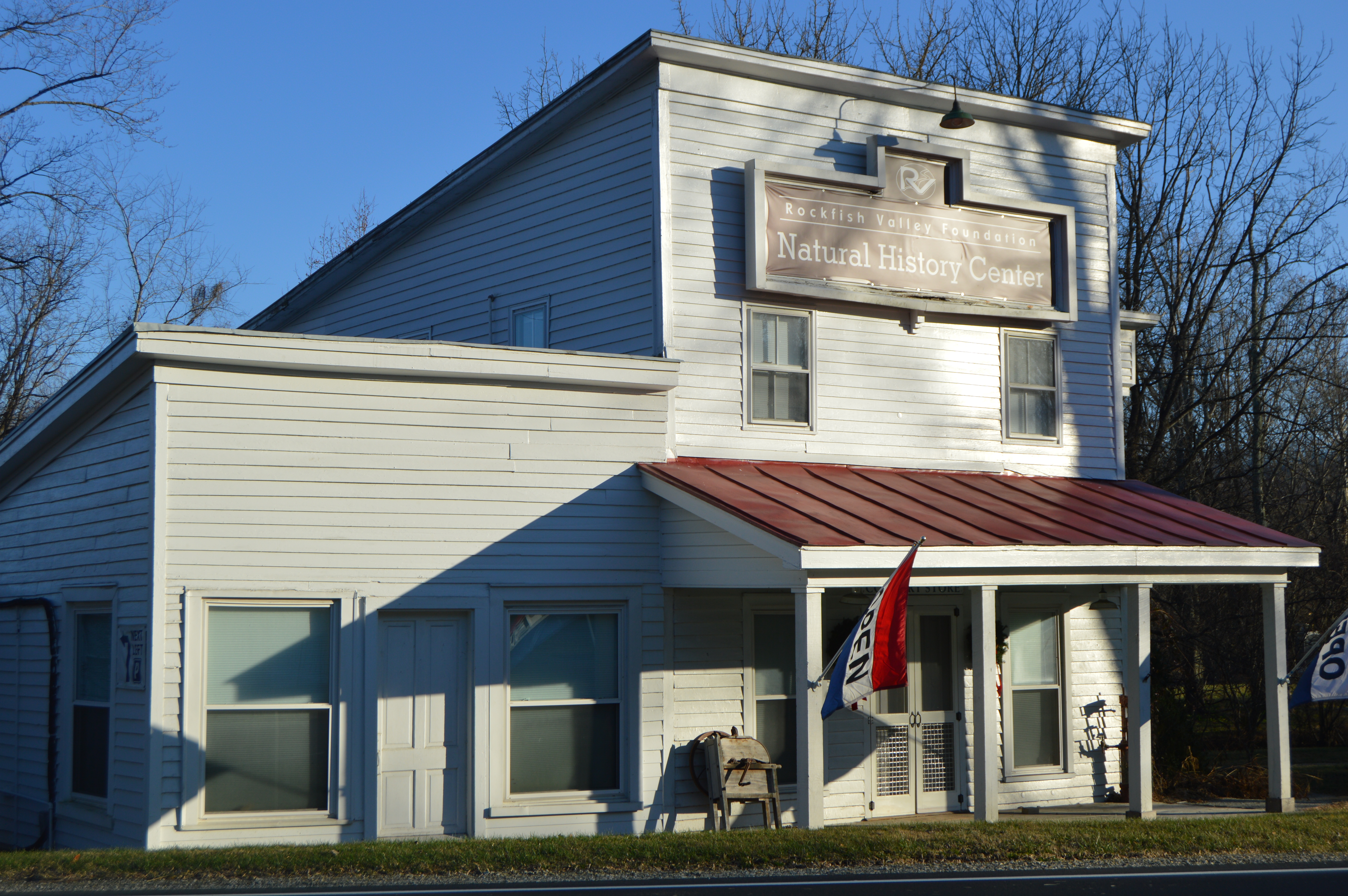
Wintergreen Country Store, at State Route 151 and Spruce Creek Ln.

Wintergreen is a census-designated place (CDP) in Augusta and Nelson counties, Virginia, United States, located near Wintergreen Resort. As of the 2020 census, Wintergreen had a population of 346.

River Bluff was listed on the National Register of Historic Places in 1980. Wintergreen is also the name of a large resort community which is nine miles away.

== Demographics ==
Historical population
Census	Pop.	Note	%±
2020	346		—
U.S. Decennial Census; 2010 2020

Wintergreen was first listed as a census designated place in the 2010 U.S. census.
