= Wingina, Virginia =

Unincorporated community in Virginia, US

Coordinates: 37°38′24″N 78°43′26″W

Wingina (/wɪnˈdʒaɪnə/) is an unincorporated community in Nelson County, Virginia, United States.

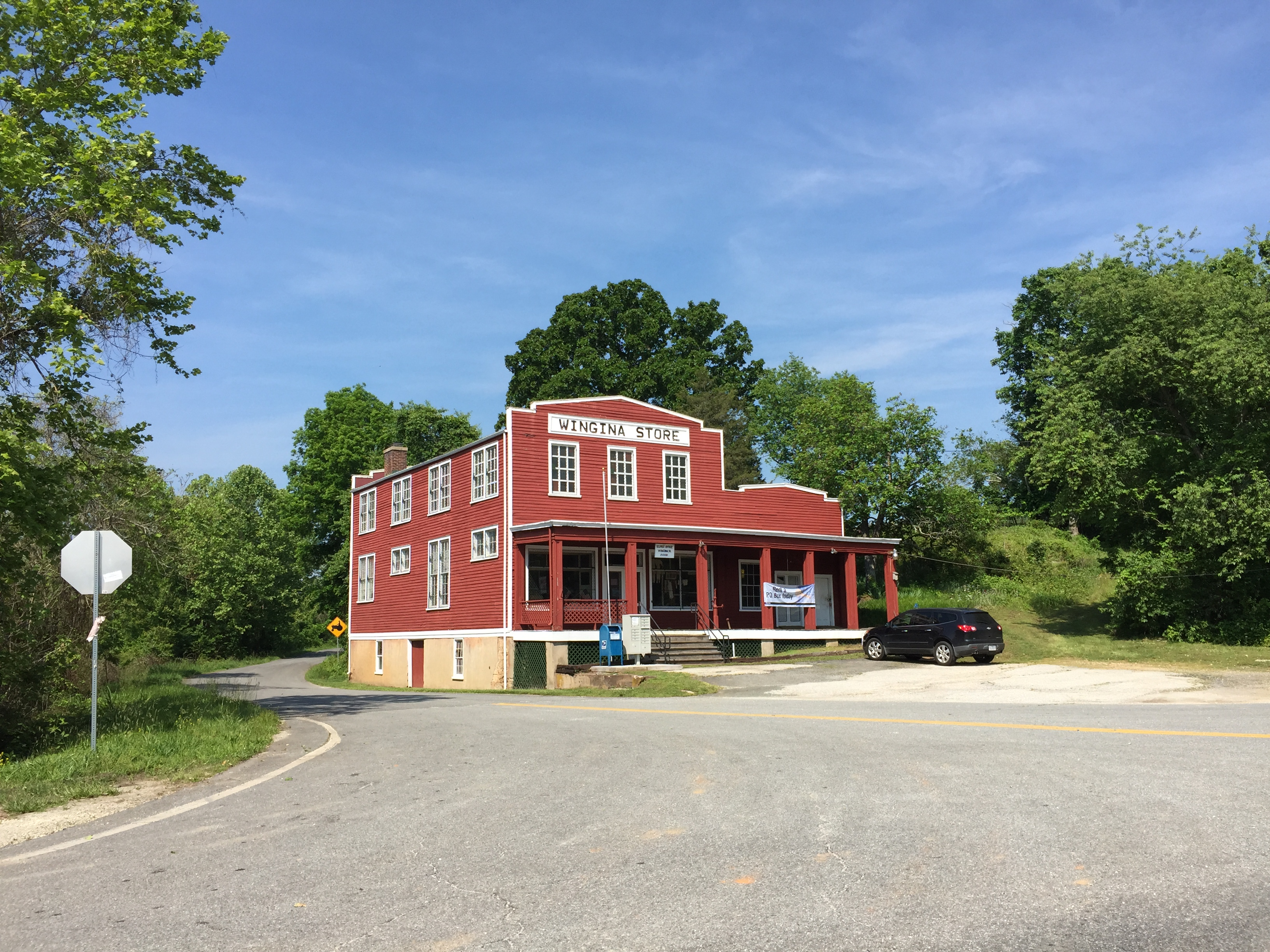
The Wingina Store

== History ==
This area was originally inhabited by Monacan Indians. The Monacan tribe and their allies, the Mannahoac, had settled central Virginia from the Rappahannock River to the James River for at least 500 years before the English arrived in Virginia. As the English encroached farther west into what is now central Virginia, the Indians dispersed to the north, south, and west. In the 19th century a number of Monacans created a settlement at Bear Mountain in Amherst County, where many of the tribe live today. The Saponi and Tutelo Indians are also remnants of this main confederacy. This village located on the banks of the James River between Buckingham and Nelson counties was part of the original land grant of Dr. William Cabell in 1735. Dr. Cabell received the grant of 25,000 acres from King George II. The Europeans first called this area "Hardwicksville".

The small town of Wingina is located south of Lovingston, situated on James River Road (SR 56) at the James River Bridge and the C&O railroad (known as Wingina Station), where the Wingina Post office and general store now stands. On the western side of Rte. 56 are the areas known as Union Hill and Norwood. On the eastern side of this road are the areas known as Midway Mills, Warminster, and Edgewood. This entire area was owned by the Cabell family.

About five miles above this area on this same road, heading towards the town of Shipman, is Glade Rd., also known as Secretary's Rd. and "Warriors Path". This road was used by the Monacan and Powhatan Confederations for hunting and war between the local tribes, consisting of Siouan-speaking (Monacan and Mannahoac) and Iroquoian-speaking groups (Cherokee). Beginning as a dirt path through the wilderness, the road was formed by the natives walking in single file. Their feet were set down from heel to toe, the advancing foot always on the line with their rear foot. The years of single file journeys had worn a deep narrow trail, crossing streams where fords were established. This trail stretched from the Rockfish River, down through Findlay's Gap into Amherst. As the area began to grow with early white settlers, this main Indian trail was widened and maintained by the local African slaves to accommodate horses and oxen, then to provide access to stagecoaches and wagons.

In 1853, the canal company owned by Joseph Carrington Cabell built a covered wooden bridge over the James River at Wingina, which was used during the American Civil War. The bridge was eventually burned by the Confederate army to prevent General Sheridan's army from crossing in their effort to cut off General Lee's retreat to Petersburg.

In 1880, the Richmond Allegheny Railroad purchased the property around the canal and named this area "Wingina" after a Secotan Indian chief of the 16th century who resisted the encroachment of the Europeans.

In 1890, the Chesapeake and Ohio Railway (C&O) acquired the property, and in 1905 the company constructed a steel-trussed bridge over the James River on the original stone piers of the earlier wooden bridge.

In 1920, the Johnson family, who owned a building supply store, moved from Buckingham County over to Wingina and established the Wingina General Store and Post Office. The store supplied the railroad ties for the C&O railroad. John Yarborough served as the first postmaster. The general store closed in 1991 but the post office still services areas of Buckingham, Norwood and Wingina.

Edgewood and Soldier's Joy are listed on the National Register of Historic Places.
