= River Bluff (Wintergreen, Virginia) =

Historic house in Virginia, United States

- U.S. National Register of Historic Places
- Virginia Landmarks Register
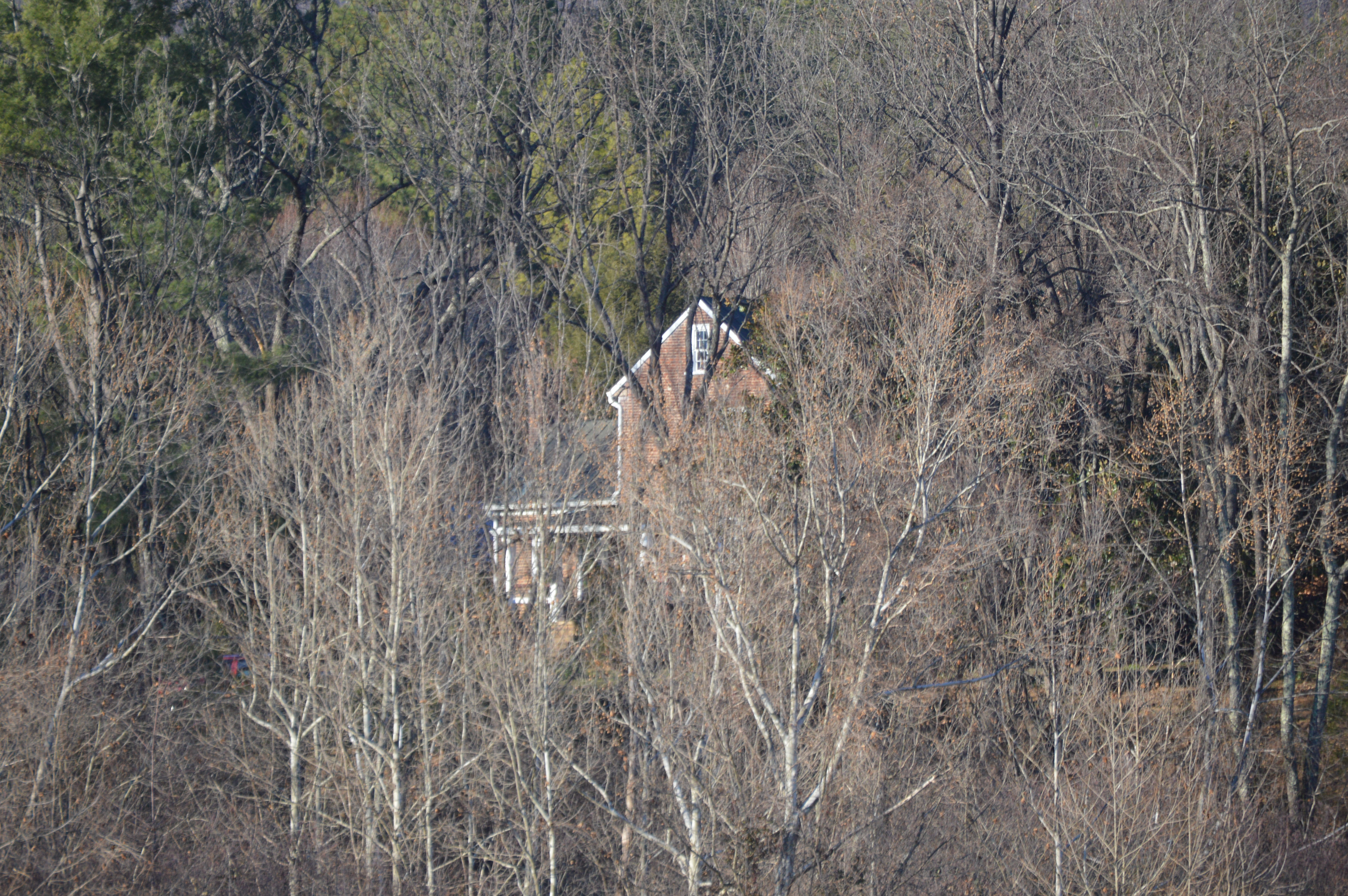
- Seen from the south through surrounding trees

- Location within Virginia Location within the United States
- Location: South of Wintergreen on State Route 151, near Wintergreen, Virginia
- Coordinates: 37°52′45″N 78°54′31″W
- Built: 1785
- NRHP reference No.: 80004205
- VLR No.: 062-0088

Significant dates
- Added to NRHP: July 30, 1980
- Designated VLR: May 20, 1980

River Bluff is a historic home located near Wintergreen, Nelson County, Virginia. It is sited on a steep bank overlooking the South Fork of the Rockfish River. It is a three-part Flemish bond brick house consisting of a two-story central pavilion with one-story flanking wings. The main block was constructed about 1785, and the house achieved its final form by about 1805.

It was listed on the National Register of Historic Places in 1980.
