= Bon Aire =

Historic house in Virginia, United States

- U.S. National Register of Historic Places
- Virginia Landmarks Register
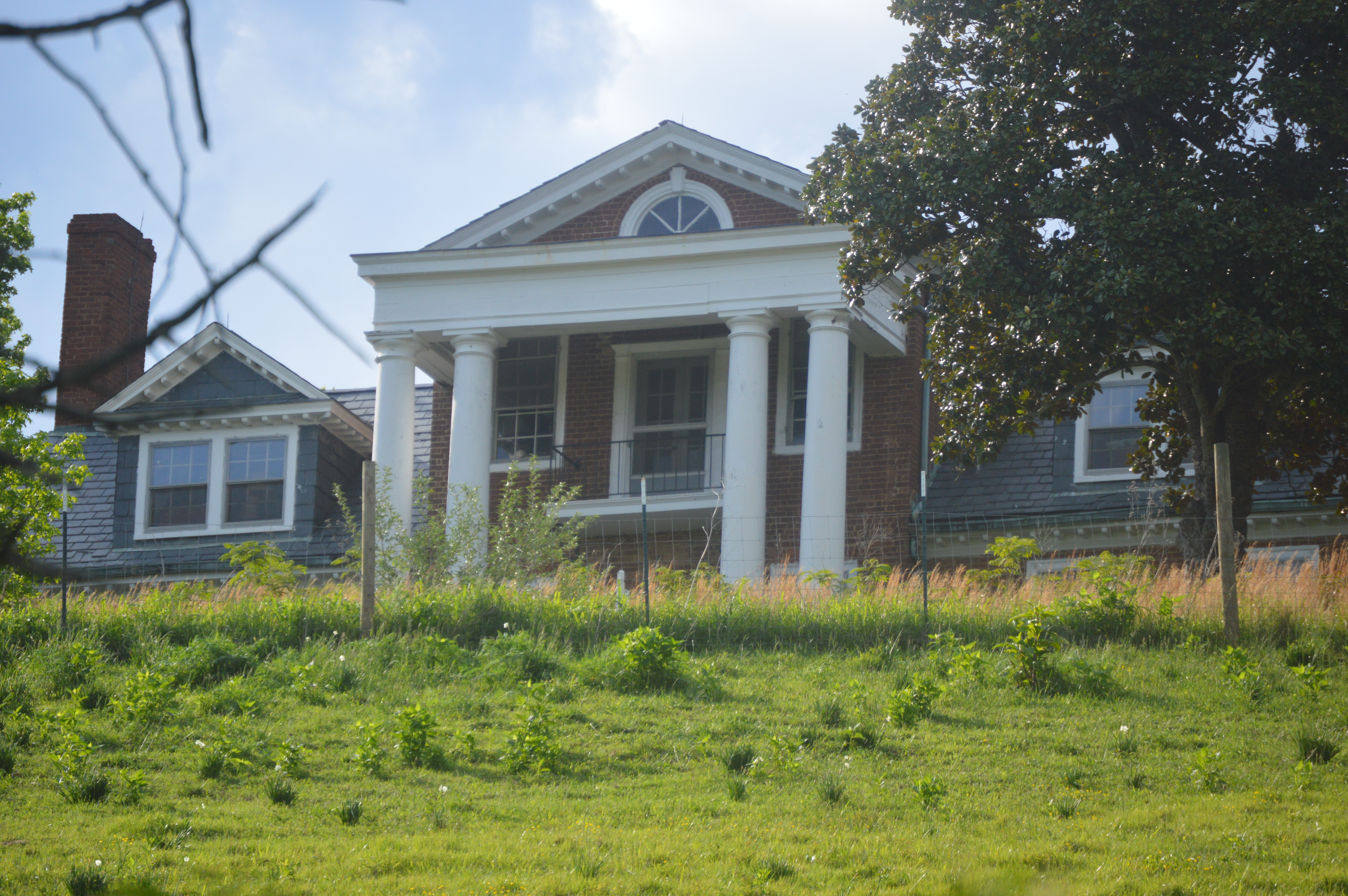
- Front of the house

- Location within Virginia Location within the United States
- Interactive map showing the location of Bon Aire
- Location: E of Shipman on State Route 626, near Shipman, Virginia
- Coordinates: 37°40′51″N 78°43′12″W
- Built: c. 1812
- Architectural style: Federal
- NRHP reference No.: 80004203
- VLR No.: 062-0089

Significant dates
- Added to NRHP: July 30, 1980
- Designated VLR: April 15, 1980

Bon Aire is a historic home located near Shipman, Nelson County, Virginia. It is a Federal-style brick dwelling dramatically sited on a hill overlooking the James River. It was built about 1812 in a three-part scheme; with a two-story center section flanked by 1 1/2-story, two-bay wings. In plan and detail Bon Aire is linked to a number of tripartite houses, such as Point of Honor in nearby Lynchburg, built for a cousin of Bon Aire's builder, Dr. George Cabell.

Bon Aire was designed by Dr. George Cabell Jr's friend, Thomas Jefferson. This assumption is quite conceivable given the close association between Jefferson and the Cabell family. UVA's music department is housed in Old Cabell Hall.

== History ==
It was listed on the National Register of Historic Places in 1980.

In 1798 or 1799, Nicholas Cabell (1750–1803) of Liberty Hall, gave part of his estate to his son, Dr. George Cabell Jr. (1774–1827). George married Susanna Wyatt, daughter of a well known Lynchburg politician in 1798. The following year, Nicholas and Hannah Cabell deeded 940 acres to George as an expression of their "natural love and affection for their son." Some sources say Bon Aire was built in 1798(1) 940 acres.(3, 4) but most likely construction began about 1809 but the house was not completed until 1812 due to lack of funds.(4)

It was designed after his cousin George's house, Point of Honor in Lynchburg.(3, 4) "George built his Palladian villa on a peak that permitted an unobstructed view in all directions".(4) Not long after his wife's death in 1817, George moved to Lynchburg and then to Richmond. He sold Bon Aire in 1826,(4) the year before he died. In 1972 the property was bought by Ormonde Wilcox and his wife, Barbara Dallas Cabell, great, great-granddaughter of Nathaniel Francis Cabell (Liberty Hall) and great, great, great, great-granddaughter of Col. Nicholas Cabell Sr.

== Construction Style ==
The Federal "T" plan brick house (the bricks were made at the Liberty Hall kiln) (3) is laid in Flemish bond with 3 interior end chimneys on the north, east and west walls. It is a distinctive three-part Palladian design. The two-story, three-bay house with a central pavilion has 1 ½ story flanking wings with dormers. The house is over a raised basement. Jeffersonian influence is seen in the Chippendale railings of the double portico and in the staircase which is tucked in a side arch between the entry hall and the library. A 12 × 4 ft. archway divides the entrance hall from the library.(1)

The entry is flanked by recessed-panel pilasters. "The traverse passage is an especially dignified room, designed to imply the greatest formality in a limited space. This is conveyed by the two arched openings, one marking the entry to the enclosed stair, the other framing the short barrel-vaulted entry to the parlor. In both instances, handsome arches with molded keystones spring from stop-reeded fluted pilasters. Remaining interior details, including pedestal-cap chair rails and simple molded baseboards, are restrained and unexceptional".(4) There are three rooms in the basement, three rooms plus an office and large room on the main floor and two attic rooms on the second floor. The double doors at the main entrance are still barred with oak timbers. The doors on the main level are wide Cross & Bible design and have the original brass locks.(3)

Bon Aire was remodeled in the 1940s and again in the 1950s.(3) Doric columns have been added to the portico and beneath the portico a balcony with supporting iron brackets has been added. Other additions include a tack room to the west and a country kitchen with an open porch to the east replacing the original kitchen.(1) In the 1950s an annex was added along with a second dining room, the kitchen, two storage rooms and a porch.(3) Bon Aire is two miles south of Warminster on Route 626. The woods to the north of the property abut Edgewood. The cemetery is east of the house and stables are to the west.
