= Montezuma (Norwood, Virginia) =

Historic house in Virginia, United States

- U.S. National Register of Historic Places
- Virginia Landmarks Register
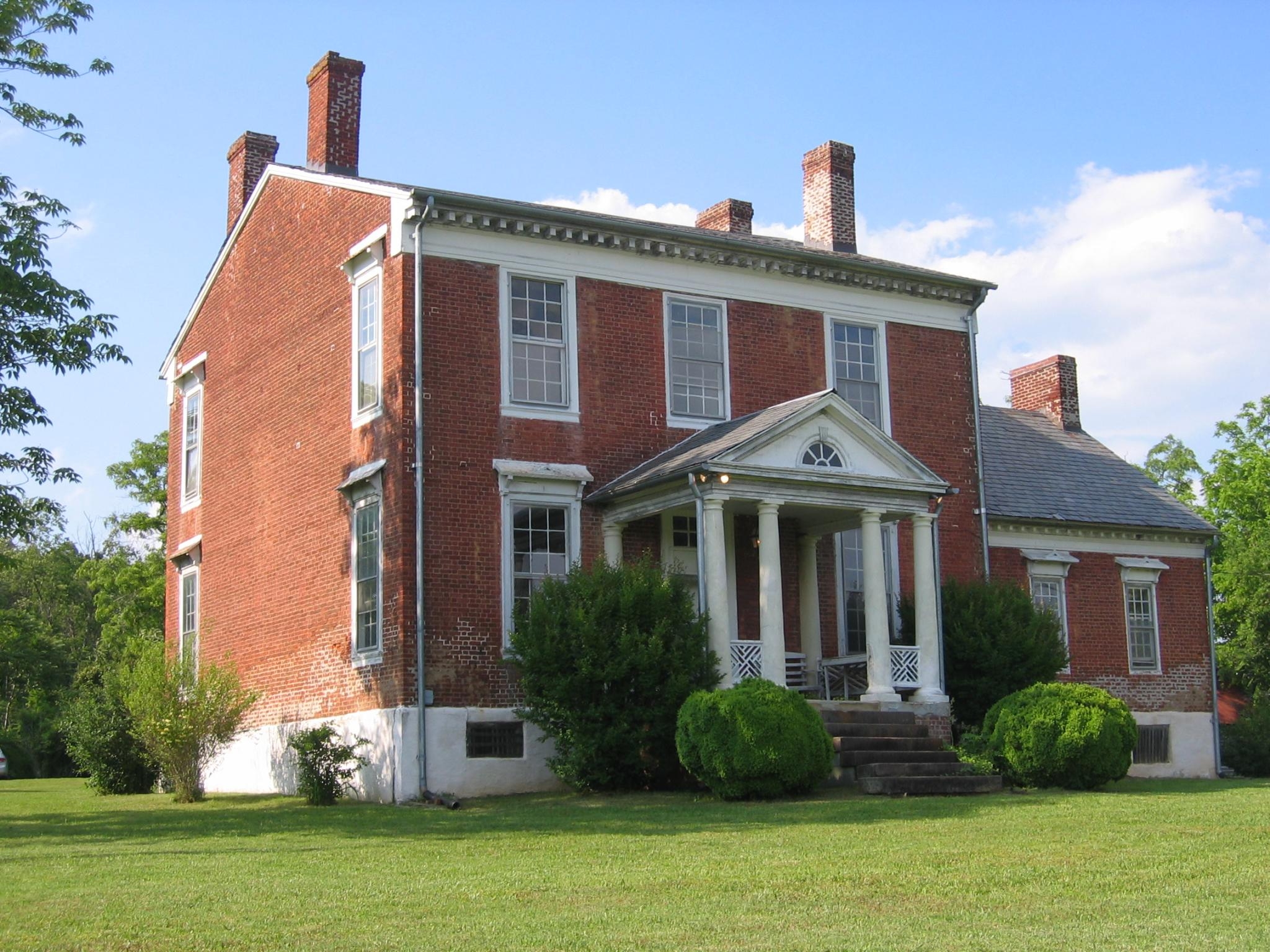
- Montezuma, May 2009

- Location within Virginia Location within the United States
- Interactive map showing the location of Montezuma
- Location: NE of Norwood on State Route 626, near Norwood, Virginia
- Coordinates: 37°38′54″N 78°48′4″W
- Built: 1790
- Architectural style: Federal
- NRHP reference No.: 80004202
- VLR No.: 062-0010

Significant dates
- Added to NRHP: July 30, 1980
- Designated VLR: April 15, 1980

Montezuma, also referred to as Spring Hill, is a historic home located near Norwood, Nelson County, Virginia. It was erected around 1790, and is a notable example of Piedmont Virginia Federal architecture. It has a two-story main block with a 1 1/2-story wing, laid in Flemish bond brick, with a Roman Revival dwarf portico. It is associated with the Cabell family, who settled in Nelson County in the second quarter of the 18th century. Because of his friendship with the Cabell family, the use of the Roman Doric order, certain exterior details and the floor plan, Thomas Jefferson is often associated with the design of the home.

It was listed on the National Register of Historic Places in 1980.
