= Nellysford, Virginia =

Place in Virginia, United States

Coordinates: 37°53′26″N 78°52′20″W

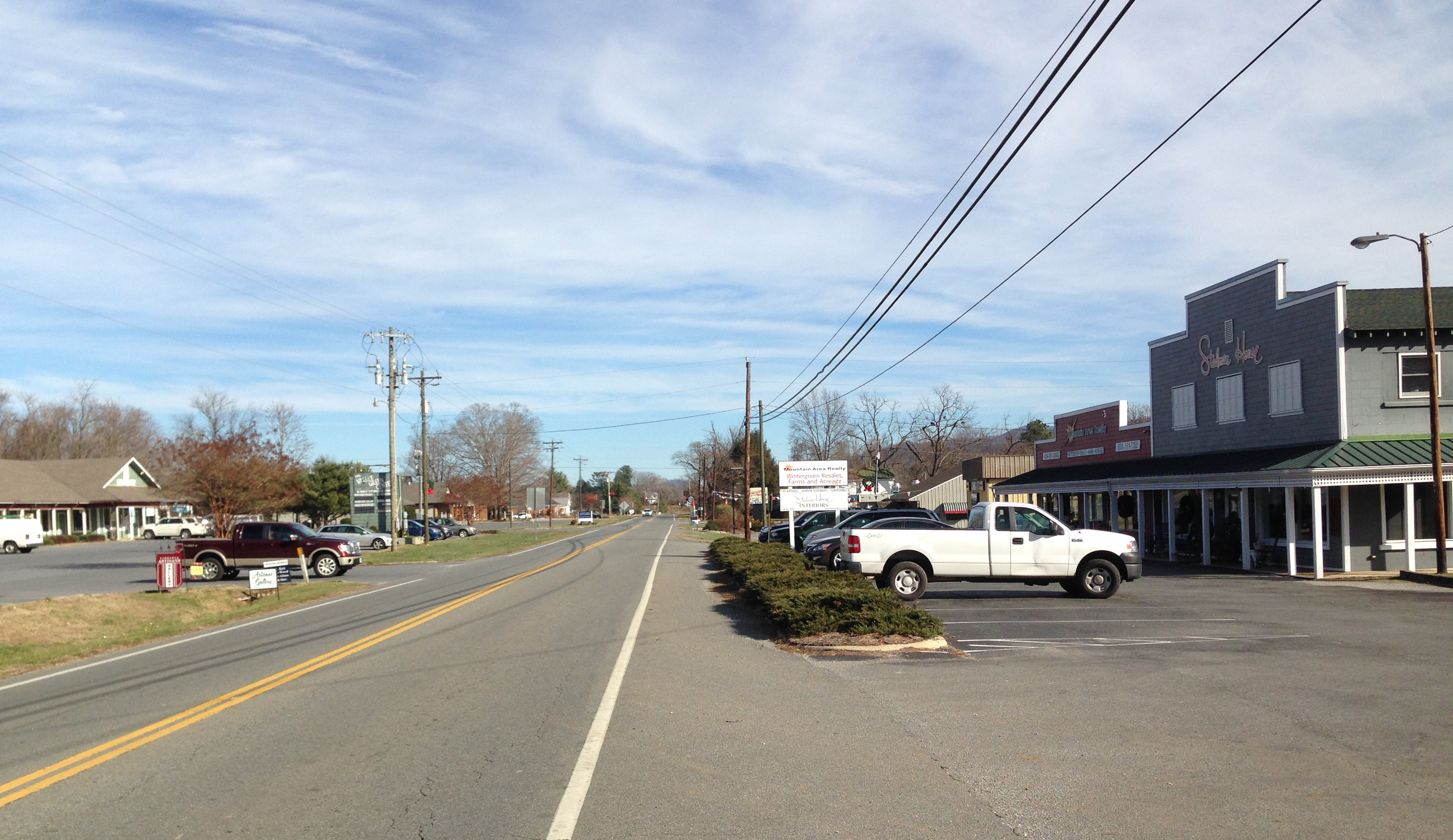
A view of Nellysford along Highway 151

Nellysford is a census-designated place (CDP) in Nelson County, Virginia, United States. As of the 2020 census, Nellysford had a population of 1,254. It is home to the Wintergreen golf course at Stoney Creek and its ZIP Code is 22958.

Elk Hill and the Wintergreen Country Store are listed on the National Register of Historic Places.

== Demographics ==
Historical population
Census	Pop.	Note	%±
2020	1,254		—
U.S. Decennial Census; 2010 2020

Nellysford was first listed as a census designated place in the 2010 U.S. census.
