= Massies Mill, Virginia =

Unincorporated community in Virginia, US

Coordinates: 37°46′38″N 79°00′04″W

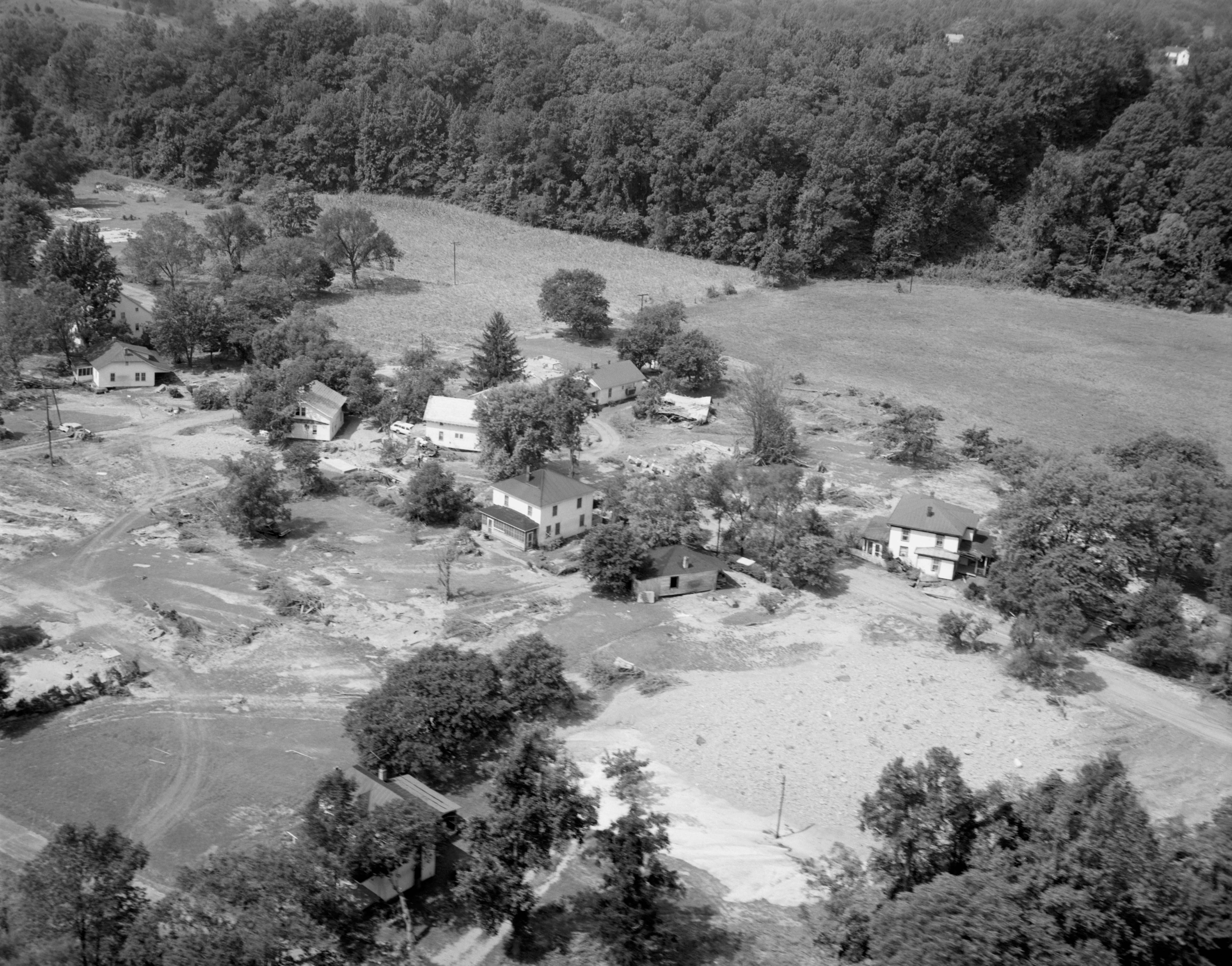
Massies Mill, Virginia

Massies Mill is an unincorporated community in Nelson County, Virginia, United States. It is located on State Route 56, adjacent to the headwaters of the Tye River. The head of the Virginia Blue Ridge Railway, a now-defunct short line railroad, was once located at Massies Mill.

In August 1969, Massies Mill, then a village of forty homes, was at or very close to ground zero during one of the worst natural disasters to strike the Commonwealth of Virginia in the 20th century as the remnants of Hurricane Camille dumped an unprecedented amount of rain on unsuspecting residents as they slept, resulting in flash floods and mudslides which killed dozens of people throughout the county and surrounding areas.

== History ==
=== Virginia Blue Ridge Railroad ===
In 1914, a company was incorporated to build a short line railroad which connected Massies Mill to the Southern Railway, a major trunk line, at Tye River Depot. The Virginia Blue Ridge Railway initially was built to haul chestnut for lumber out of the heavily timbered Piney River area to local mills until World War I. The chestnut blight wiped out much of the timbered areas. However, the railroad later served several quarries in the area where titanium dioxide and aplite were mined.

The VBR also passed through the communities of Roses Mill, Piney River, Canopy, Lowesville, and Buffalo Mine. It followed the course of the Tye and Piney Rivers for several miles before entering the mountains. The line was abandoned in 1980. Part of the roadbed is being developed as a rails-to-trails project, the Blue Ridge Railway Trail.

=== Tropical Storm Camille ===
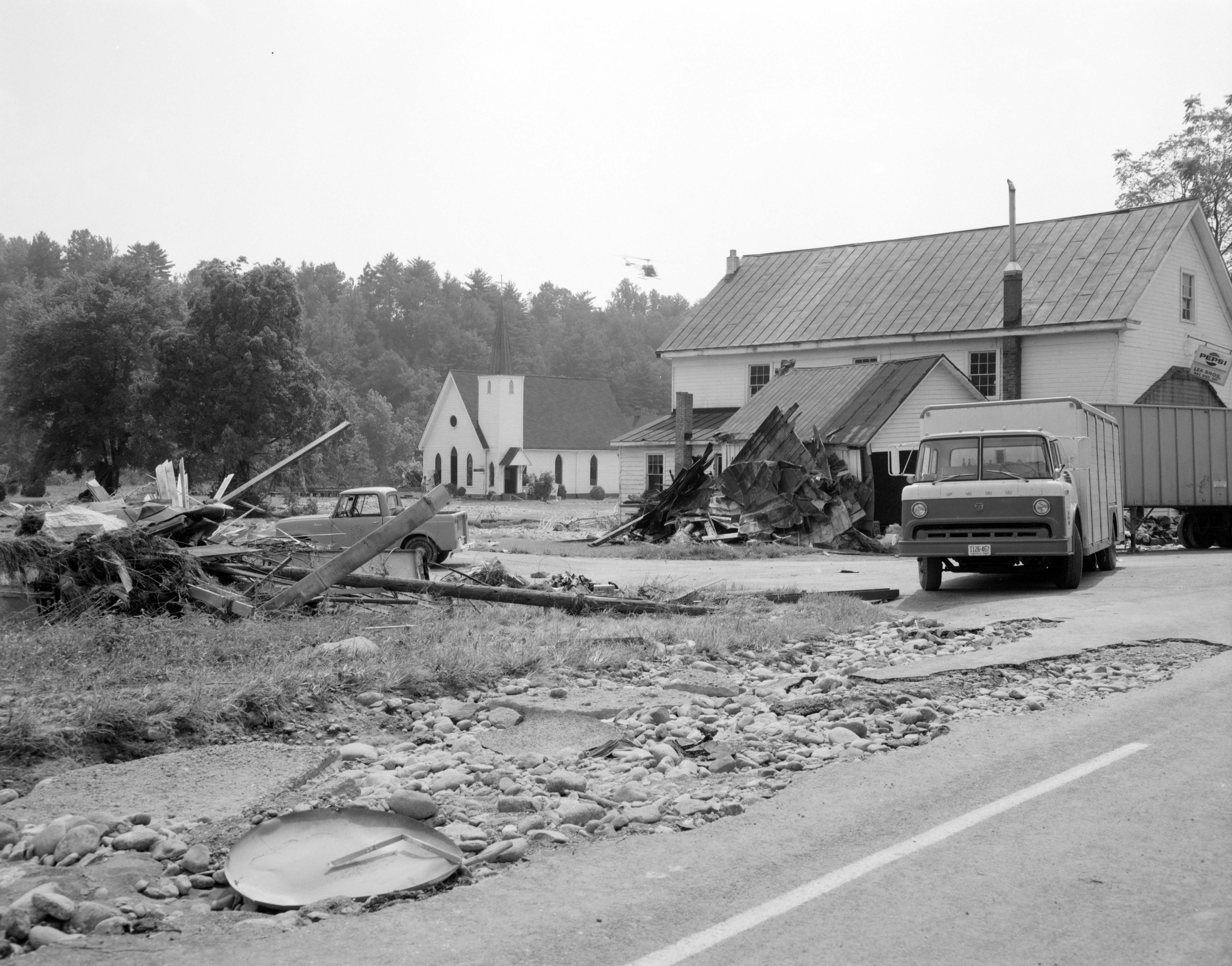
Storm damage in Massies Mill after the passage of Camille

On the night of August 19, 1969, Massies Mill became one of the hardest hit communities when the remnants of Hurricane Camille arrived. The hurricane had come ashore on the Gulf Coast near the mouth of the Mississippi River as a Category 5 storm, one of only three to strike the US mainland during the 20th century. The hurricane flattened nearly everything along the coast of the U.S. state of Mississippi, and caused additional flooding and deaths inland. The storm had lost strength as it crossed hundreds of miles of land, and was downgraded by the National Weather Service to Tropical Storm status as it moved northwardly along the eastern side of the Appalachian Mountains and into Virginia. It still carried incredible amounts of moisture and contained sufficient strength and low pressure to pull in additional moisture.

As it reached the area centered on Nelson County, a hilly, rural county with a population of approximately 15,000, the storm unexpectedly stalled on the eastern side of the Blue Ridge Mountains. Within a three-hour period, it dumped a record quantity of 27 inches (690 mm) of rain. The rainfall was so heavy there were reports of birds drowning in trees and of survivors who had to cup their hands around mouth and nose in order to breathe through such a deluge.

As many people slept unaware, the ensuing flash floods and mudslides killed 153 people, 22 of them in Massies Mill alone. Across Nelson County, 133 bridges were washed out, while some entire communities were under water. The major flooding that occurred downstream cut off all communications between Richmond and the Shenandoah Valley. Waynesboro on the South River saw eight feet of water downtown, and Buena Vista had more than five feet. Total damage in the state amounted to $140.8 million (1969 USD, $747 million 2005 USD).
