= Tye River =

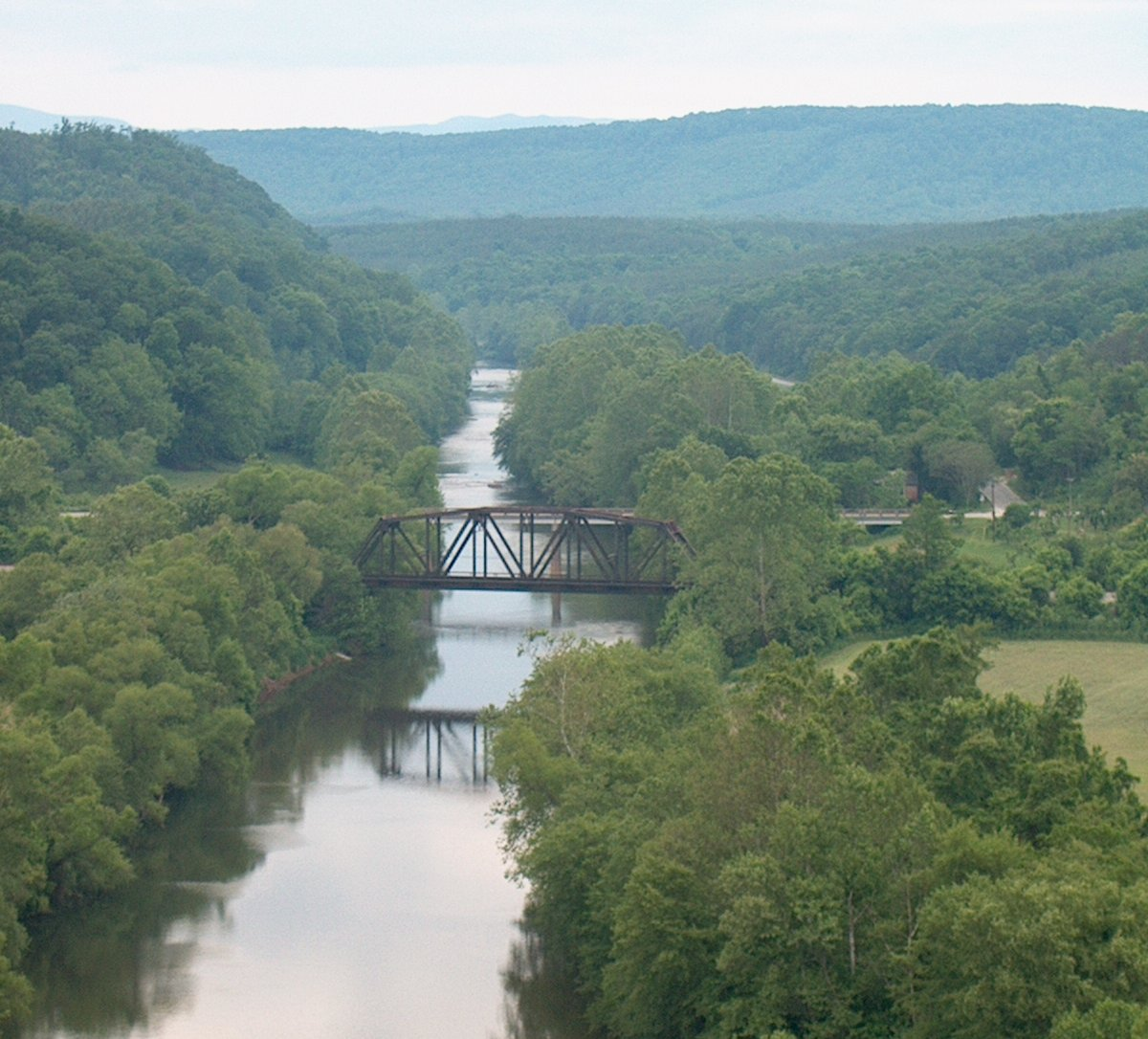
- From a bluff in James River State Park, the Tye River is seen looking upstream just west of its confluence with the James River, near Norwood in Nelson County, Virginia

Location
- Country: United States

Physical characteristics
- Source
  - location: Virginia
  - elevation: 1,270 feet (390 m)
- Mouth
  - location: James River
  - coordinates: 37°38′24″N 78°48′25″W
  - elevation: 350 feet (110 m)
- Length: 35.4 mi (57.0 km)

The Tye River is a 35.4-mile-long (57.0 km) tributary of the James River in central Virginia in the United States. Originating on the eastern slope of the Blue Ridge Mountains in Nelson County, and fed by the Piney and Buffalo rivers, by way of the James River it is part of the watershed of the Chesapeake Bay.

Although normally it is one of the more minor tributaries of the James River, in August 1969, the Tye River was at the center of one of Virginia's worst natural disasters. In the aftermath of Hurricane Camille, which had devastated the Gulf Coast of Mississippi a few days earlier, the remnants of the Category 5 hurricane stalled over mostly rural Nelson County, causing an unprecedented deluge of rain, mostly within a 3-hour period as people slept unaware of the threat. In the flash flooding and mudslides, entire communities were virtually wiped out, killing hundreds of Virginians, some of whose bodies were never found. Bridges, roads, railroads, and communications were severed for days, resulting in an estimated $140 million in property damages.

In Massies Mill, one of the hardest hit communities in the Camille disaster, the Sierra Club erected a memorial in a small park which is dedicated to those who lost their lives and families in 1969. In modern times, the Tye River has become one of the more scenic and popular recreational waterways in Virginia.

== Course ==
The Tye River rises at the confluence of the North and South forks of the river(37°51′26″N 79°02′46″W), at the village of Nash in northern Nelson County, Virginia, on the eastern slope of the Blue Ridge Mountains. The North Fork rises near the Blue Ridge Parkway (37°53′10″N 79°08′51″W) at Tye River Gap and flows 8.7 miles (14.0 km) east, then southeast, to its confluence with the South Fork. The South Fork also rises along the Blue Ridge Parkway (37°50′34″N 79°09′11″W), southwest of the village of Montebello, and flows east 7.6 miles (12.2 km) to the North Fork at Nash.

From Nash, the Tye River proper flows generally southeastward through central Nelson County. The Piney River is a tributary of the Tye. Each forms a portion of Nelson's western border with Amherst County. The Tye River enters the James River from the northwest near Norwood, adjacent to James River State Park in Buckingham County.

Towns and communities along the Tye River include Tyro, Massies Mill, Roseland and Tye River, all in Nelson County.

== History ==
Much of the upper course of the Tye River was bordered by the Virginia Blue Ridge Railway, a short line railroad built in 1915. Originally, the area was heavily forested with chestnut trees, which were harvested for lumber transported by the railroad. However, these were largely decimated by chestnut blight in the 1920s. Later, the railroad was used to transport several types of minerals mined nearby in small quantities, but that activity ended by 1970. Passenger train service had ended in 1939, although State Route 56 was built nearby. In the 1980s, the tracks were abandoned.

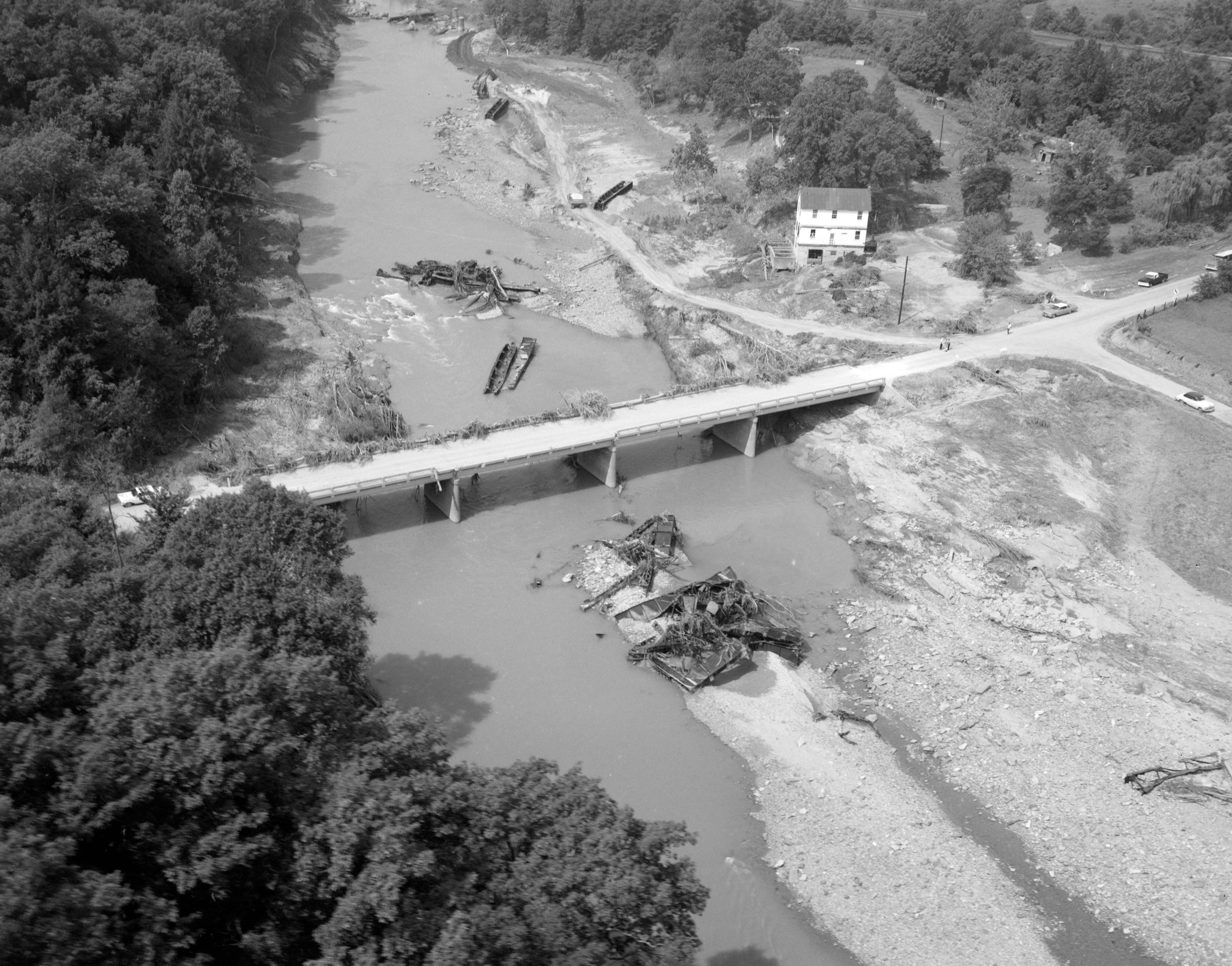
Flood damage along the Tye River, in the aftermath of Hurricane Camille

On the night of August 20, 1969, the headwaters of the Tye River were near ground zero during one of the worst natural disasters in Virginia history. A few days earlier, Hurricane Camille had come ashore on the Gulf Coast near the mouth of the Mississippi River as a Category 5 storm, one of only three to strike the US mainland during the 20th century. The hurricane flattened nearly everything along the coast of Mississippi, and caused additional flooding and deaths inland. The storm had lost strength as it crossed hundreds of miles of land, and was downgraded by the National Weather Service to tropical storm status as it moved northward along the eastern side of the Appalachian Mountains and into Virginia. It still carried incredible amounts of moisture and contained sufficient strength and low pressure to pull in additional moisture.

As the remnants of the hurricane reached the area centered on Nelson County, the storm unexpectedly stalled on the eastern side of the Blue Ridge Mountains. Mostly within only a three-hour period, it dumped a record quantity of 27 inches (690 mm) of rain. The rainfall was so heavy there were reports of birds drowning in trees and of survivors who had to cup their hands around mouth and nose in order to breathe through such a deluge.

As many people slept unaware, the ensuing flash floods and mudslides killed 153 people, 22 in Massies Mill alone. Across Nelson County, 133 bridges were washed out, while some entire communities were under water. Waynesboro on the South River saw 8 feet (2.4 m) of water downtown, and Buena Vista on the Maury River had more than 5 feet (1.5 m).

Every bridge across the Tye River was severed, including the major highway bridge for U.S. Route 29 at the Amherst County line and the Southern Railway's main line bridge near Norwood. Just below the latter crossing, the waters of the Tye River flowed into the James River. Joined by massive flooding from other tributaries, the James crested in Richmond at 28.6 feet (8.7 m) at the City Locks, swamping downtown areas and a substantial portion of South Richmond, which had formerly been the separate city of Manchester.

In Nelson County, the bodies of some people were never found; other washed as much as 25 miles (40 km) downstream along the creeks and rivers. The entire county was virtually cut off, with many roads and virtually all bridges, telephone and electric service interrupted. Total damage in the state amounted to $140.8 million (1969 USD, $747 million 2005 USD).

== Fish species ==
The Tye River is home to dozens of species of fish and other aquatic life, including American eels, small and largemouth bass, and native mussels. A dam was removed in 2007 to help facilitate fish migration. According to an official of the Virginia Department of Game and Inland Fisheries, "Removing the dam will increase the passage possibilities, and hopefully the populations of all these species. It will also allow for increased access for anglers, paddlers and boaters."

== Recreation ==
Fishing and camping are popular activities along the Tye River. Sections of the Tye River are also popular for whitewater boating with canoes and kayaks. The rapids are rated Class I to Class II+. Depending upon water conditions some rapids on the Tye River can approach class III.

Sections of the former Virginia Blue Ridge Railway along the Tye River are now part of the Blue Ridge Railway Trail which was under development in the early 21st century. The trail will eventually connect the James River with the Blue Ridge Parkway and the Appalachian Trail.

== See also ==
- List of rivers of Virginia
- Hurricane Camille
