= Piney River (Tye River tributary) =

Coordinates: 37.67681°N 78.96697°W

Location
- Country: United States

Physical characteristics
- Source
  - location: Virginia

The Piney River is a 16.5-mile-long (26.6 km) tributary of the Tye River in the U.S. state of Virginia. It is part of the James River watershed.

The river rises in the Blue Ridge Mountains at the confluence of its North and South forks. For its entire length it forms the boundary between Amherst and Nelson counties. It flows southeast into the Virginia Piedmont, passing the villages of Lowesville and Piney River. It joins the Tye River 3 miles (5 km) upstream from the village of Tye River.

== See also ==
- List of rivers of Virginia
