= Whippany =

Whippany may refer to the following in the U.S. state of New Jersey:

- Whippany, New Jersey, a town in Morris County
  - Whippany Railway Museum, a railway museum and excursion train ride in the above town
- Whippany River, a tributary of the Rockaway River in Morris County
