= United States Army 4039 =

Preserved American 0-6-0 locomotive

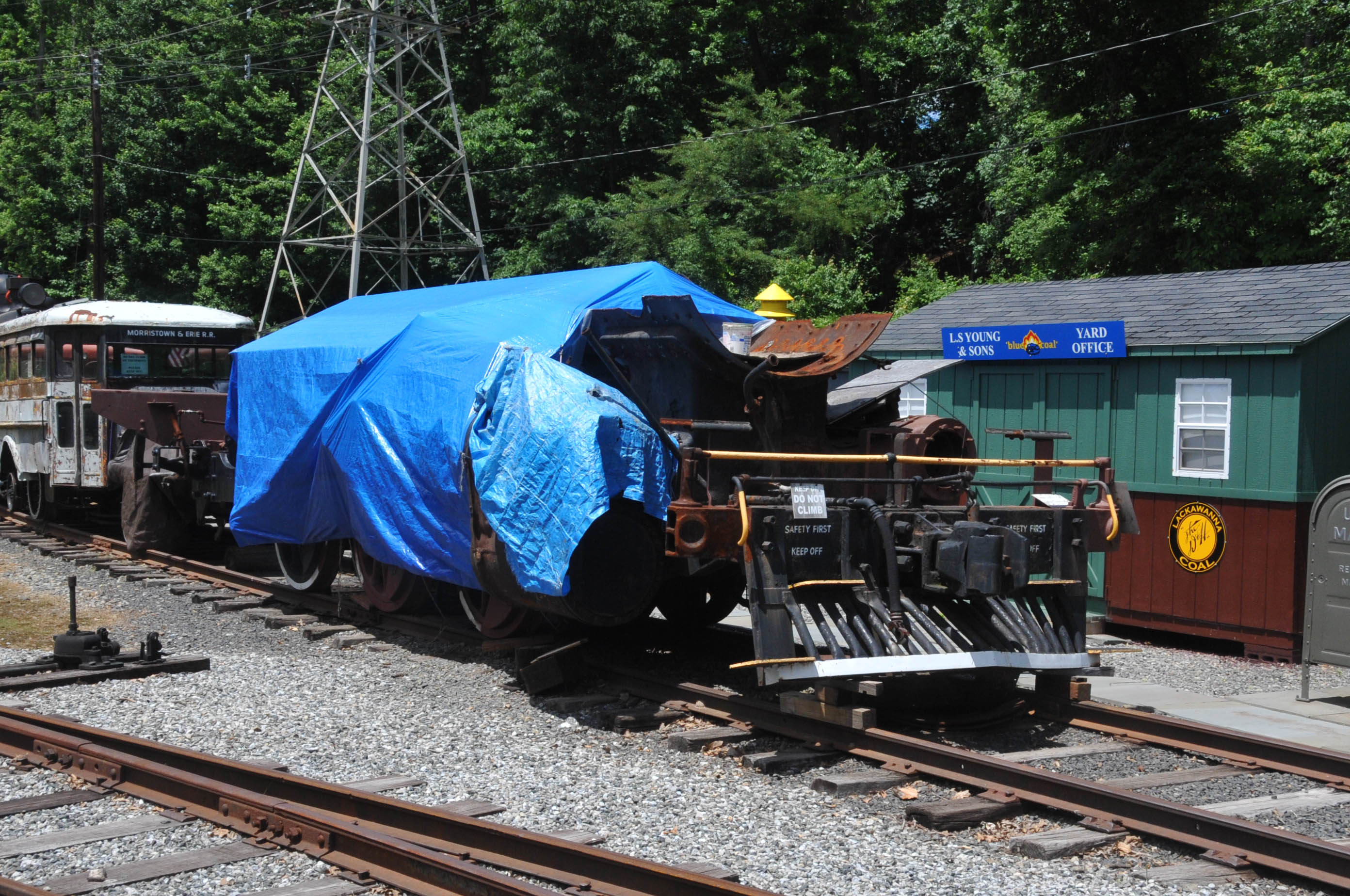
- No. 4039 awaiting restoration at Whipanny Train Museum
Type and origin
- Power type: Steam
- Builder: American Locomotive Company
- Serial number: 70421
- Build date: November 1942
Specifications
- Configuration
  - Whyte: 0-6-0
- Gauge: 4 ft 8 1/2 in (1,435 mm)
- Driver dia.: 44 in (1.118 m)
- Fuel type: New: Coal; Now: Oil
- Tender cap.: 8 tons coal 6,000 gallons water 1,500 gallons fuel oil
- Boiler pressure: 190 psi (1.31 MPa)
- Cylinders: Two, outside
Career
- Operators: United States Army; Virginia Blue Ridge Railway; Morris County Central Railroad
- Class: S155
- Numbers: USATC 4039; VBR 5; CCR 4039
- Retired: August 1, 1963 (revenue service); December 14, 1980 (1st excursion service)
- Restored: August 27, 1966 (1st excursion service)
- Current owner: Whippany Railway Museum
- Disposition: Undergoing restoration to operating condition
- United States Army Steam Locomotive No. 4039
- U.S. National Register of Historic Places
- New Jersey Register of Historic Places
- Location within Morris County, New Jersey Location within New Jersey Location within the United States
- Location: 1 Railroad Plaza, 10 West and Whippany Road, Hanover Township, New Jersey
- Coordinates: 40°49′23″N 74°24′41″W
- Area: less than one acre
- Built: 1942
- Architect: American Locomotive Company
- Architectural style: Steam locomotive
- NRHP reference No.: 02000108
- NJRHP No.: 3947
Significant dates
- Added to NRHP: March 4, 2002
- Designated NJRHP: December 20, 2001

United States Army 4039 is a preserved 0-6-0 "Switcher" type steam locomotive. Built in November 1942 by the American Locomotive Company (ALCO) for the U.S. Army, it was retired in 1963 and set aside for preservation.

Sold to the Morris County Central Railroad in 1965, it hauled excursions until 1980 when her flue time expired. Sitting in storage for nearly 14 years, she was bought by the Whippany Railway Museum (WRM) in 1994 to cosmetically restore the engine. In 2015, the museum officials expressed interests for restoring the engine to working order for use on local railroads. As of 2026, the engine is currently being restored to operational condition.

== History ==
The locomotive was built by the American Locomotive Company (ALCO) in November 1942 for the U.S. War Department. The locomotive is an S155 class 0-6-0 "Switching"-type built for Standard gauge track. The intended use of the locomotive was for U.S. military service in the Far East, Africa and Europe, but instead was used for switching operations for military bases within the United States during World War II. After World War II the locomotive was no longer needed by the War Department and was sold to the Virginia Blue Ridge Railway (VBR) on February 17, 1947. The locomotive was used in freight operations until August 1, 1963 when it was retired from revenue service, after that, the Virginia Blue Ridge Railway made the change over to diesel locomotives.

In 1965, the locomotive was sold to the Morris County Central Railroad (MCCR) where it was converted to burn oil and was restored on August 27, 1966 and used for passenger rail excursions. The locomotive's last run was on December 14, 1980, between Newfoundland and Stockholm, New Jersey. The Whippany Railway Museum (WRM) acquired the locomotive on May 7, 1994, and cosmetically restored it for static display. The Morris County Board of Chosen Freeholders adopted a Resolution designating the locomotive "The Official Steam Locomotive of Morris County" on January 26, 1997. As of 2024, the engine is currently undergoing restoration to operating condition where, when restored, it will run primarily on local area railroads.

== See also ==
- National Register of Historic Places listings in Morris County, New Jersey
- Southern Railway 385
- Duluth and Northeastern 29
- Tennessee Valley Railroad 610
- Wilmington and Western 58
