= Beaufort station =

Beaufort station or Beaufort Station may refer to:

== Military ==
- Marine Corps Air Station Beaufort, a United States Marine Corps air base near Beaufort, South Carolina

== Transportation ==
- Beaufort station (New Jersey), a former railway station in Roseland, New Jersey
- Beaufort railway station (Sabah), in Malaysia
- Beaufort railway station, Victoria, in Australia
- Beaufort railway station (Wales), in the United Kingdom
