= Blue Ridge Railway Trail =

Rail trail in Virginia, United States

Coordinates: 37°42′29″N 79°1′21″W

- Length: 6.9-mile (11.1 km)
- Location: Nelson County, Virginia

The Blue Ridge Railway Trail is a rail trail in Virginia.

It is a 6.9-mile (11.1 km) gravel surface recreational trail used for biking, hiking and horseback riding and occupies an abandoned Virginia Blue Ridge Railway corridor. The trail was completed in sections between 2003 and 2010.

The trail starts at a trailhead along Route 151 in Piney River, Virginia, where there is parking for cars and horse trailers as well as a portajohn. The trail follows the course of the Piney River, and after 2 miles (3.2 km), it crosses Virginia Route 674 in Roses Mill, Virginia, where there is limited parking for cars. The trail continues along the Piney River for another 2.5 miles (4.0 km) and then crosses the Tye River just downstream of its confluence with the Piney River. The trail then follows the Tye, passing under US Route 29 and ending at Tye River Depot, where a railroad car scale is preserved. There is no highway access at the Tye River Depot trailhead. The trail is open from sunrise to sunset.

The trail runs on a former railway spur that ran to a quarry in Piney River from 1915 to 1981.
