= Roses Mill, Virginia =

Unincorporated community in Virginia, US

Coordinates: 37°42′06″N 78°59′47″W

Roses Mill is an unincorporated community in Nelson County, Virginia, United States. It lies along the path of the now-defunct Virginia Blue Ridge Railway.
