= Buffalo River (Virginia) =

Coordinates: 37°36′13″N 79°1′28″W

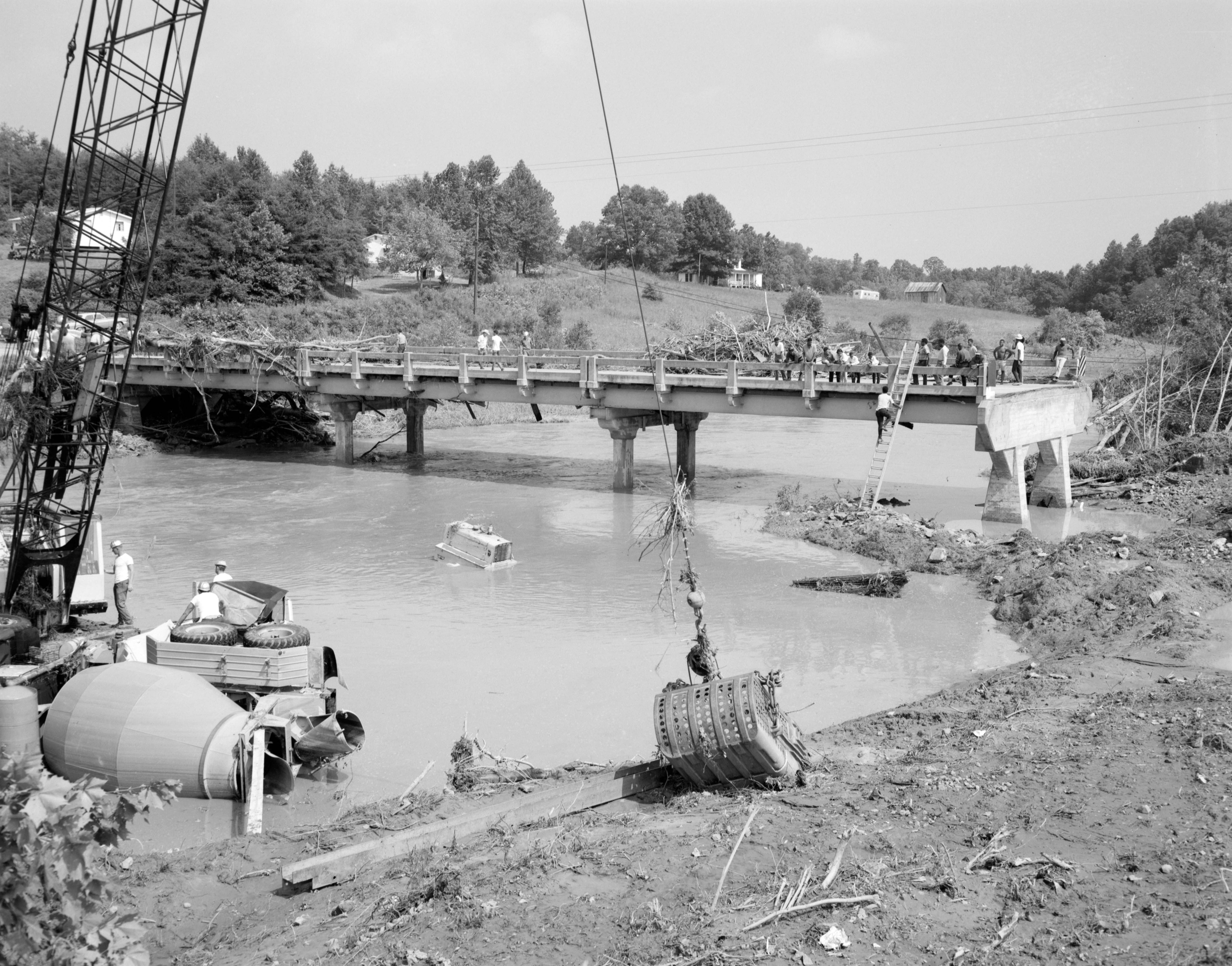
- A bridge across the Buffalo River which was washed out by Hurricane Camille in 1969

Location
- Country: United States

Physical characteristics
- Source
  - location: Virginia

The Buffalo River is a 31.5-mile-long (50.7 km) tributary of the Tye River in the U.S. state of Virginia. It is part of the James River watershed.

It rises at the eastern foot of the Blue Ridge Mountains at Forks of Buffalo along U.S. Route 60 in Amherst County, where the North and South forks of the Buffalo River converge. From there the main stem flows southeast, passing north of the county seat of Amherst, then turns northeast and enters Nelson County, joining the Tye River northeast of the village of Piedmont.

== See also ==
- List of rivers of Virginia
