= Southern Railway 385 =

Preserved American 2-8-0 locomotive

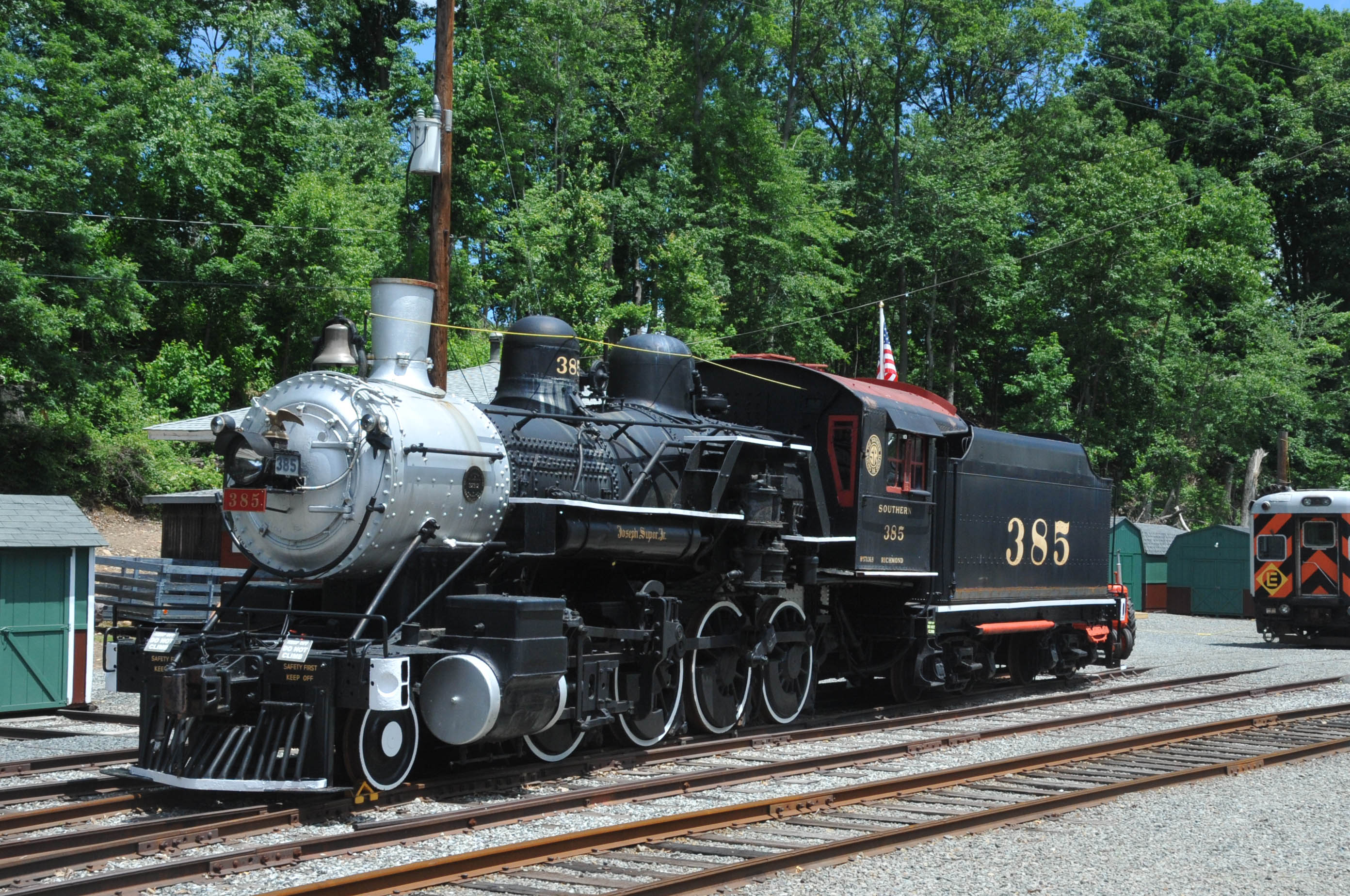
- Southern No. 385 on static display at the Whippany Railway Museum in Whippany, New Jersey in 2007
Type and origin
- Power type: Steam
- Builder: Baldwin Locomotive Works
- Serial number: 32312
- Build date: November 1907
Specifications
- Configuration
  - Whyte: 2-8-0
  - UIC: 1′D
- Gauge: 4 ft 8 1/2 in (1,435 mm)
- Driver dia.: 57 in (1.448 m)
- Fuel type: Coal
- Boiler pressure: 200 psi (1.38 MPa)
- Cylinders: Two, outside
- Cylinder size: 21 in × 28 in (533 mm × 711 mm)
- Valve gear: Walschaerts
- Valve type: Piston valves
- Loco brake: Air
- Train brakes: Air
- Couplers: Knuckle
Performance figures
- Tractive effort: 36,827 lbf (163.81 kN)
Career
- Operators: Southern Railway; Virginia Blue Ridge Railway; Morris County Central Railroad
- Class: H-4
- Numbers: SOU 385; VBRR 6
- Retired: 1952 (revenue service); April 1, 1959 (1st excursion service); October 14, 1978 (2nd excursion service)
- Restored: 1956 (1st excursion service); 1963 (2nd excursion service)
- Current owner: Whippany Railway Museum
- Disposition: On static display

Southern Railway 385 is a preserved H-4 clsss 2-8-0 "Consolidation" type steam locomotive. Built in November 1907 by the Baldwin Locomotive Works (BLW), originally for the Southern Railway's Richmond Division, it was transferred to the Virginia Blue Ridge Railway (VBR) and renumbered to No. 6. In 1956, No. 385 was put on standby service before officially being retired in 1959.

Sold to the Morris County Central Railroad, No. 385 was restored back to operation and hauled excursions until the railroad's bankruptcy in October 1978, putting No. 385 out of service. Bought by the Delaware Otsego Corporation, the engine was put into storage. She was then donated to Bergen County Vocational & Technical High School in 1990 and then sold to Bergen Tech to put on display near the Hackensack River. By 1999, the "Stationary Steam Course" went bankrupt with reported preparations to scrap No. 385. Hearing this, Mr. Supor bought the engine at the last minute, trucking the engine to his facility in Harrison, New Jersey. It was eventually sold to the Whippany Railroad Museum.

== History ==
In No. 385's last years on the Southern, it worked on the Richmond Division hauling branch line mixed trains. On November 17, 1952, after a 45-year career on the Southern, No. 385 was sold to the Virginia Blue Ridge Railway (VBR) and was renumbered to 6. The shortline put the engine on standby service in 1956 and on April 1, 1959, the engine was officially retired from revenue service.

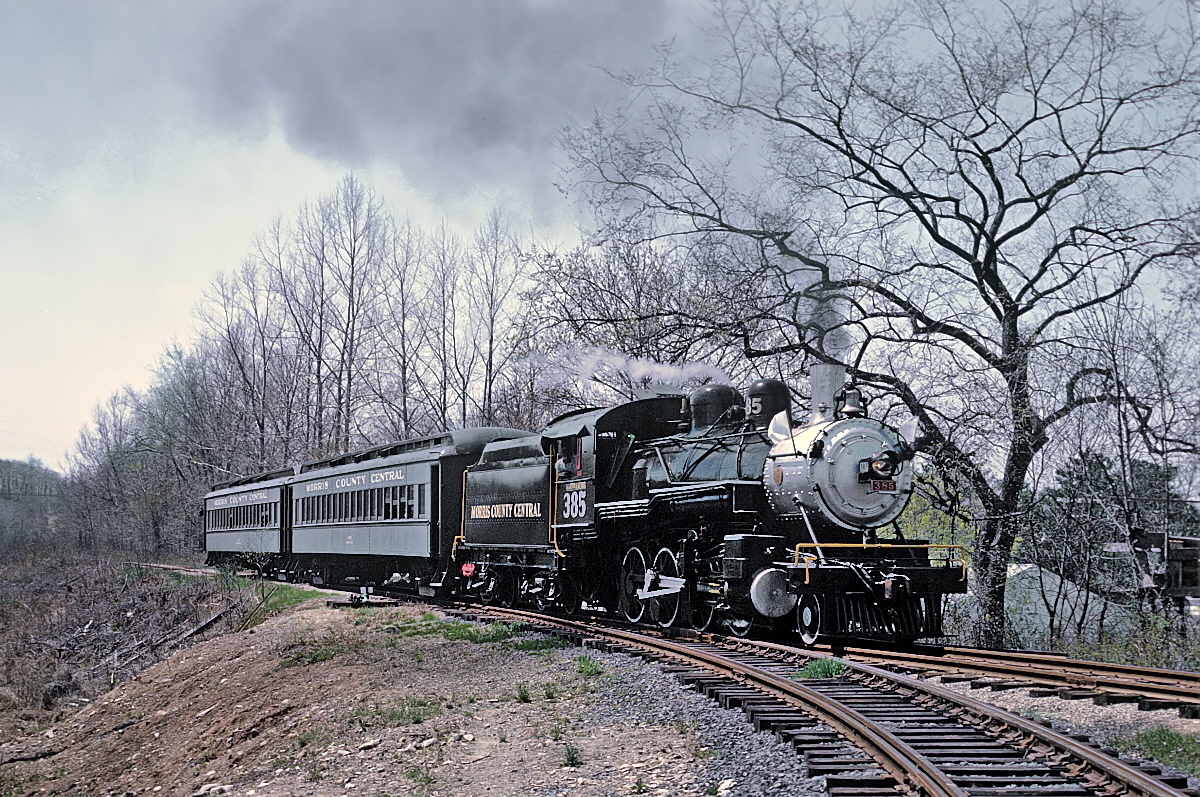
Southern No. 385 passing through Beauford, New Jersey in 1969

In 1963, the locomotive was sold to Earle H. Gil Sr. who restored it to run on the Morris County Central Railroad. The locomotive ran on the MCCRR hauling excursion trains until the MCCRR's defunction on October 14, 1978. In 1982, the Delaware Otsego Corporation (the parent company of the NYS&W) acquired the assets of the Morris County Central, including No. 385. The DO / NYS&W had early plans to restore No. 385 to operation and run her over their lines in excursion service, but this did not come to pass. After many years of subsequent storage, and taking on the sad patina of neglect, the Delaware Otsego donated the locomotive to the Bergen County Vocational & Technical High School in Hackensack, New Jersey in June 1990.

In October 1990, Joseph Supor Sr., the founder of J. Supor & Son Trucking & Rigging Co., Inc. donated No. 385 nearly 2 miles from the rails of the NYS&W to Bergen Tech, where the locomotive was lifted into place on a panel of display track in an area adjacent to the school athletic field, alongside the Hackensack River. By 1999, the direction had changed drastically at Bergen Tech, when the “Stationary Steam Course” (which had been established in 1952) was eliminated and all facets of the program were disassembled and removed. Reportedly, preparations were being made to immediately dispose of No. 385 by scrapping it.

At this point, Joseph Supor Sr. became aware of the dire situation and bought the locomotive at the very last minute, as it was due to be cut up within hours of his acquisition. Mr. Supor's rigging crew carefully removed No. 385 from the schoolyard and trucked the locomotive to his facility in Harrison, New Jersey.

Mr. Supor stored No. 385 with intentions of cosmetically restoring the locomotive for display at his company headquarters. Unfortunately, this never occurred, although there were many discussions on what to do to preserve this unique relic from the nation's industrial past.

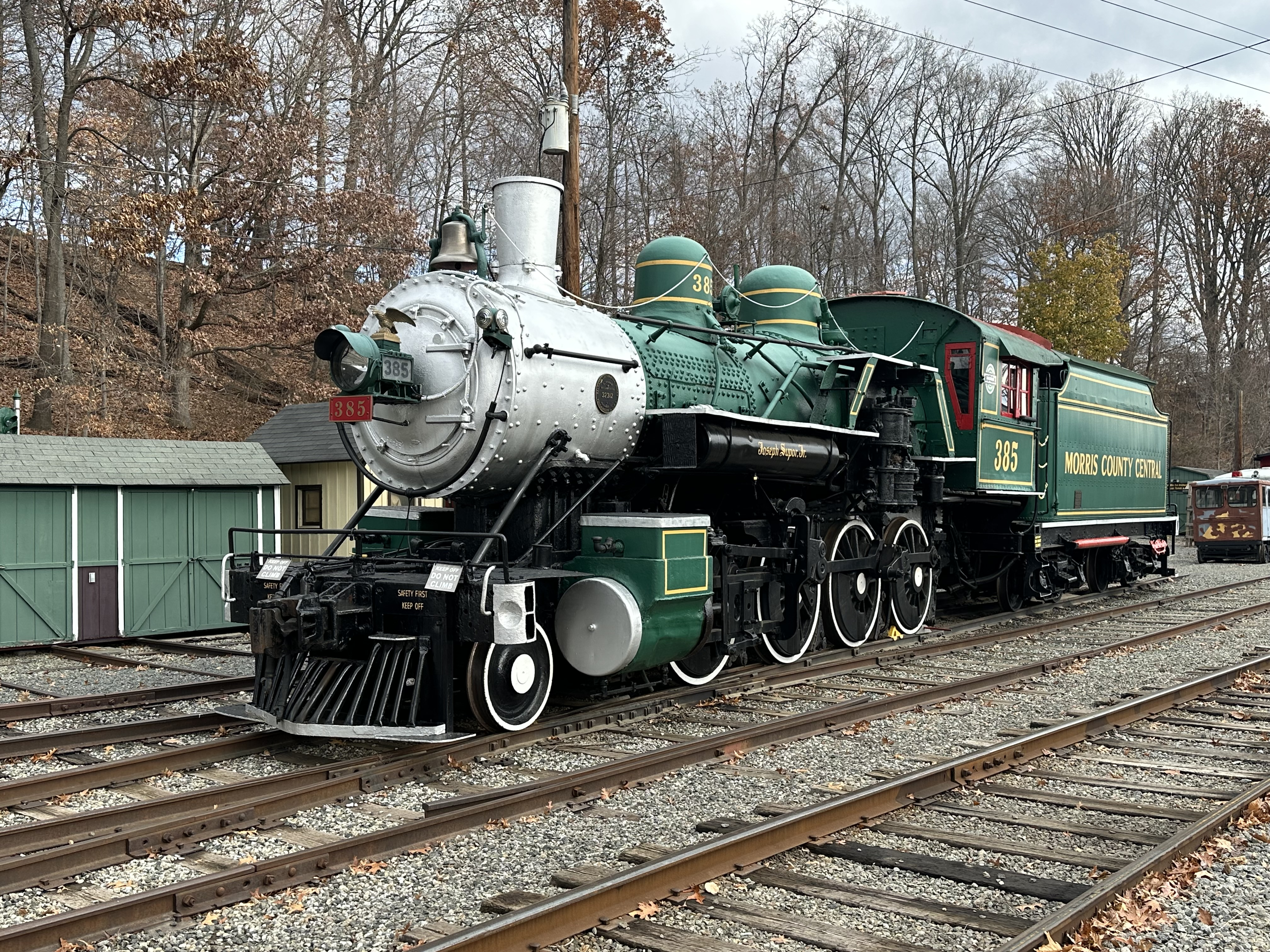
385 painted in its MCC scheme.

In 2007, Joseph Supor Jr., the son of Joseph Supor Sr., donated the No. 385 to the Whippany Railway Museum in Whippany, New Jersey, where it sits on static display. In 2021, the Whippany Railway Museum repainted 385 into the green and gold paint scheme that it used to wear for the Morris County Central Railroad.
