= Mitchell's Brick House Tavern =

Historic tavern in Virginia, United States

- U.S. National Register of Historic Places
- Virginia Landmarks Register
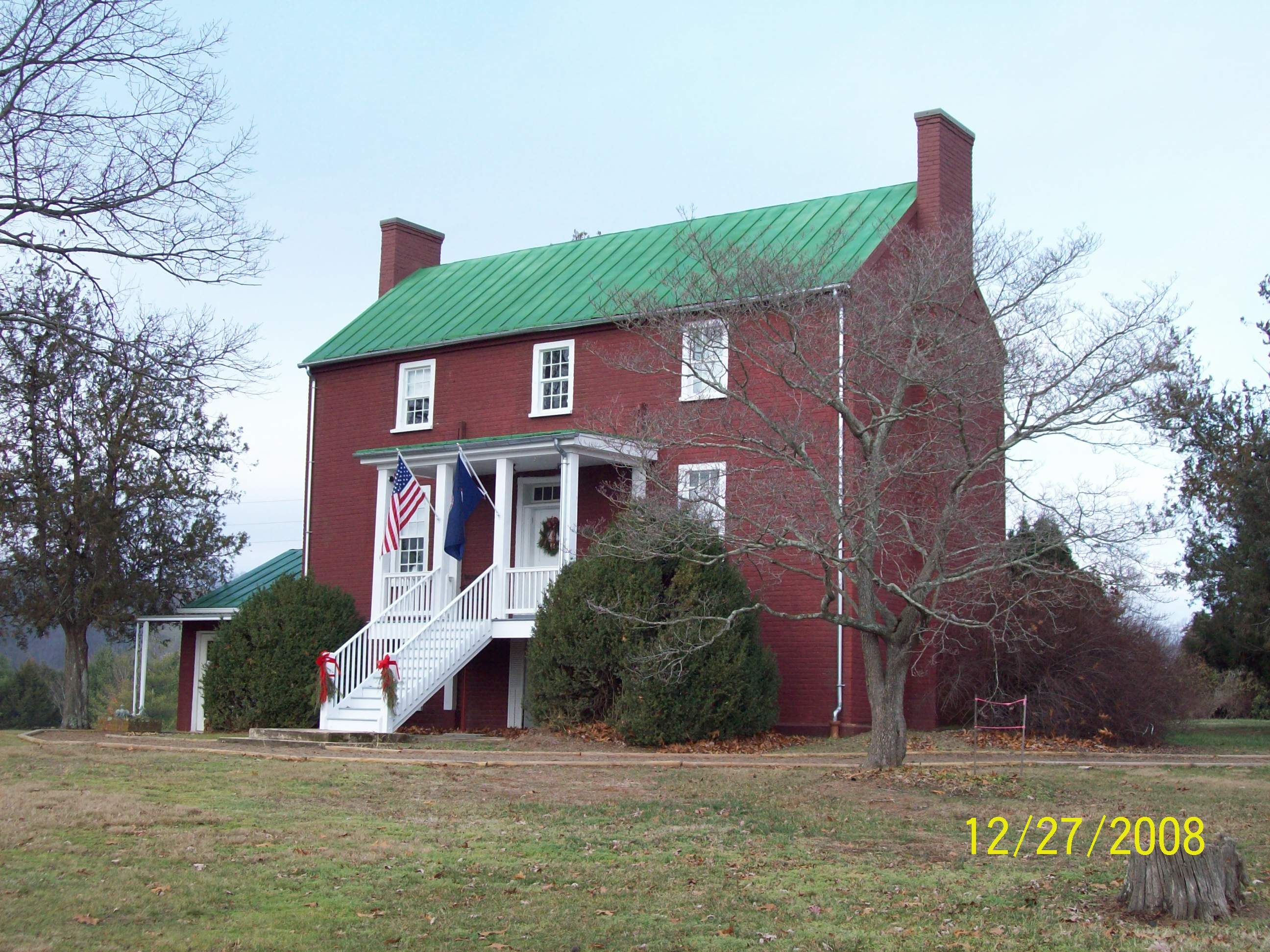
- Oakland House, December 2008

- Location within Virginia Location within the United States
- Location: 5365 Thomas Nelson Hwy., Arrington, Virginia
- Coordinates: 37°43′5″N 78°54′44″W
- Built: 1838
- Architectural style: Greek Revival
- NRHP reference No.: 06000355
- VLR No.: 062-0052

Significant dates
- Added to NRHP: May 03, 2006
- Designated VLR: March 8, 2006

Mitchell's Brick House Tavern, also known as Oakland, Hite House, Goodwin Tavern, Goodwin House and Coco House, is a historic home located at Arrington, Nelson County, Virginia. It is a two-story, painted brick Greek Revival-style house with a raised or English basement, built about 1838. The estate consists of the main house with two additions, several dependencies (including an old log smokehouse), a garage, and the small Goodwin Family cemetery.

It is home to the Nelson County Museum of History, who named the project "Oakland."

It was listed on the National Register of Historic Places in 2006.

== Gallery ==
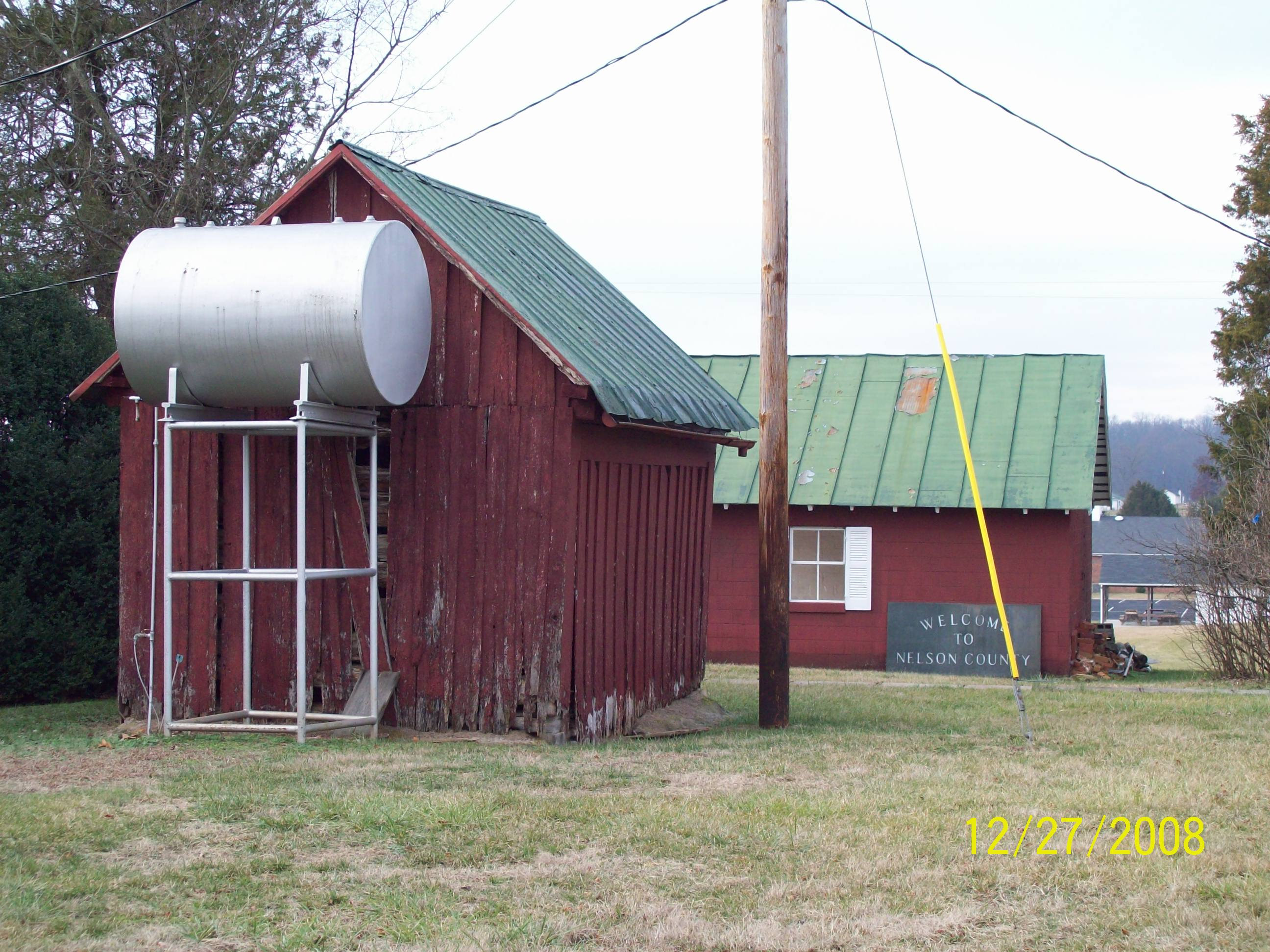
Oakland Dependencies, Nelson Co., Va., December 2008

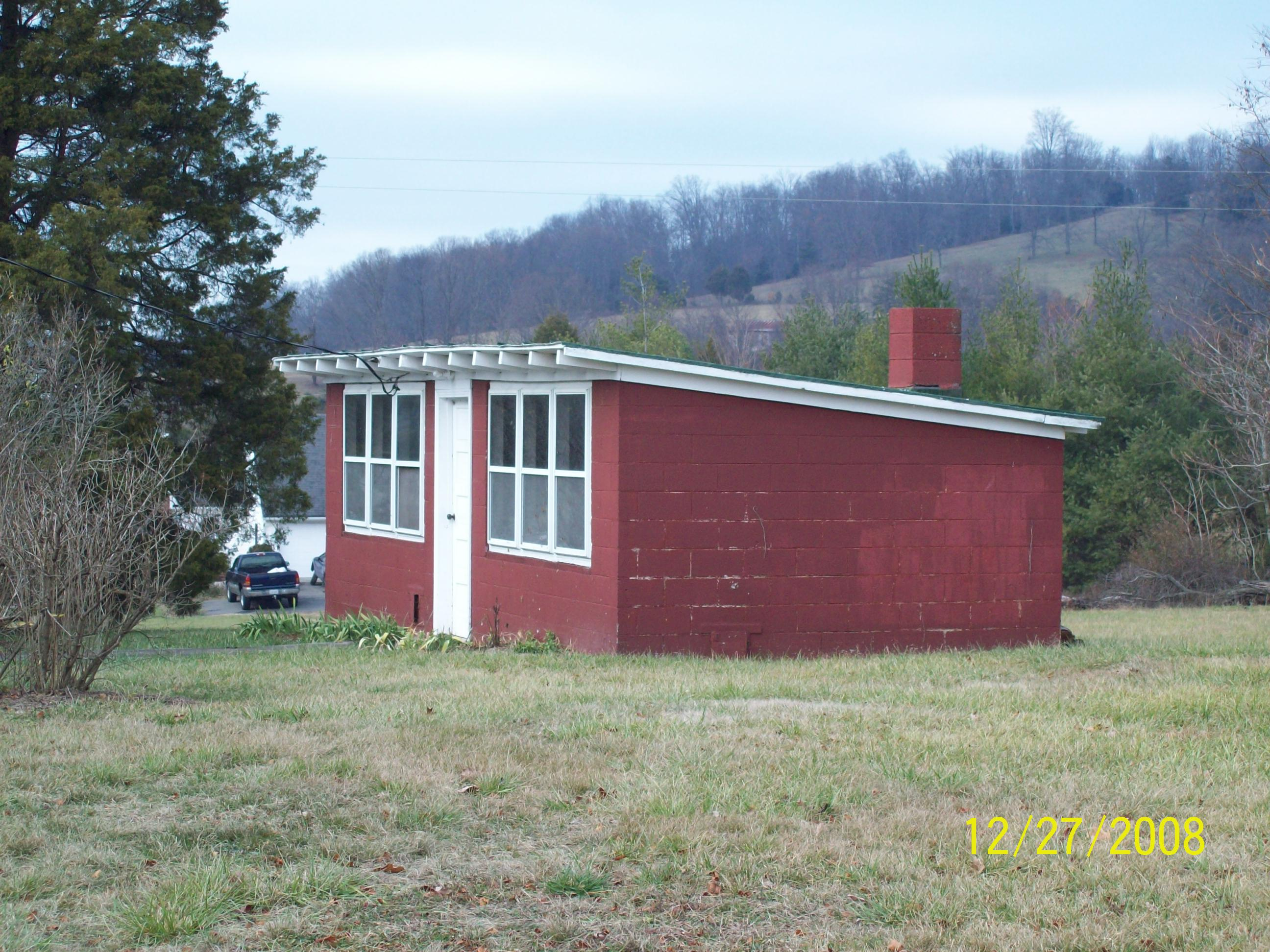
Oakland Dependencies, Nelson Co., Va., December 2008

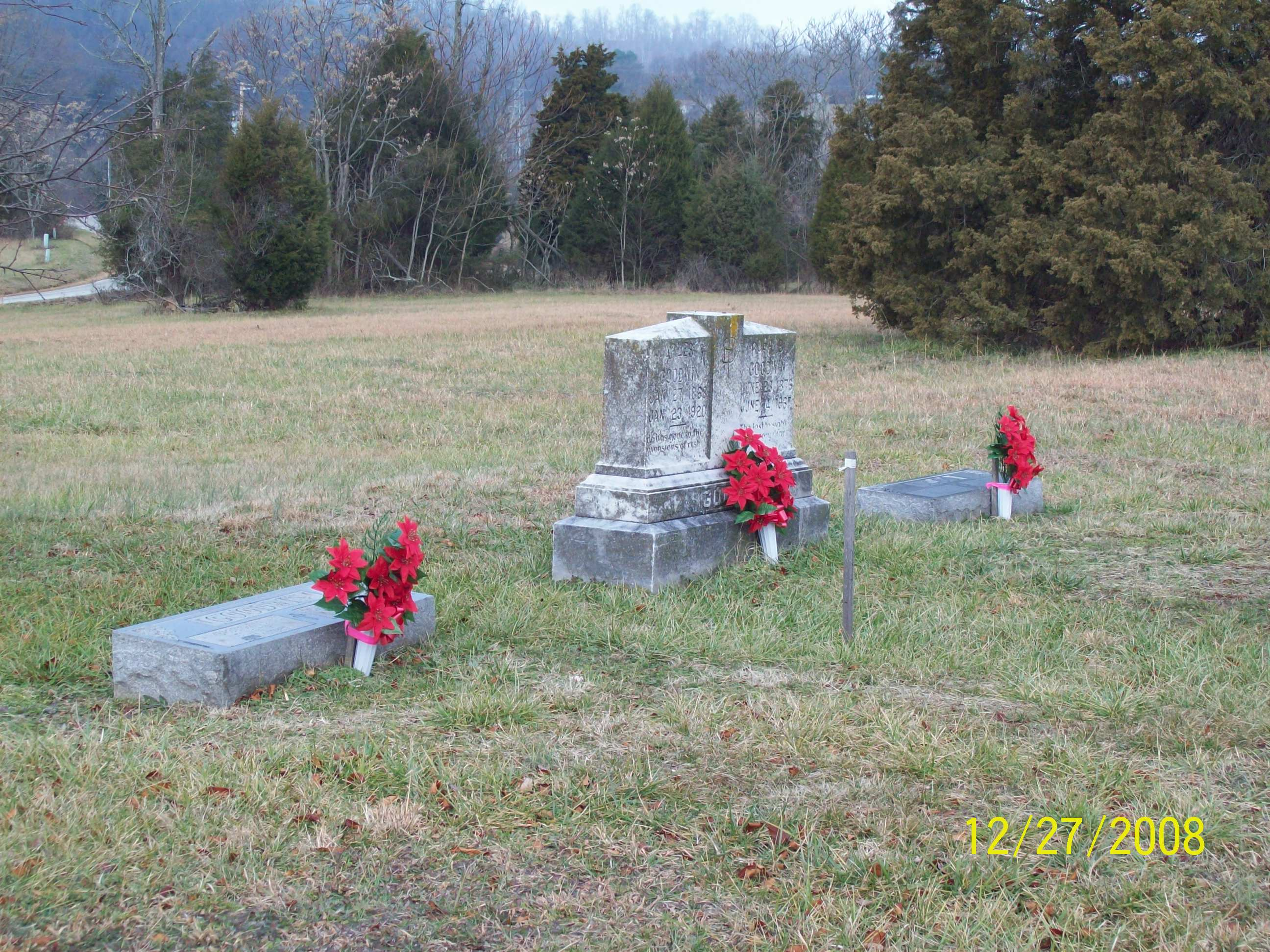
Goodwin Family Cemetery, Nelson Co., Va., December 2008
