= Morristown and Erie Railroad Whippany Water Tank =

- U.S. National Register of Historic Places
- New Jersey Register of Historic Places
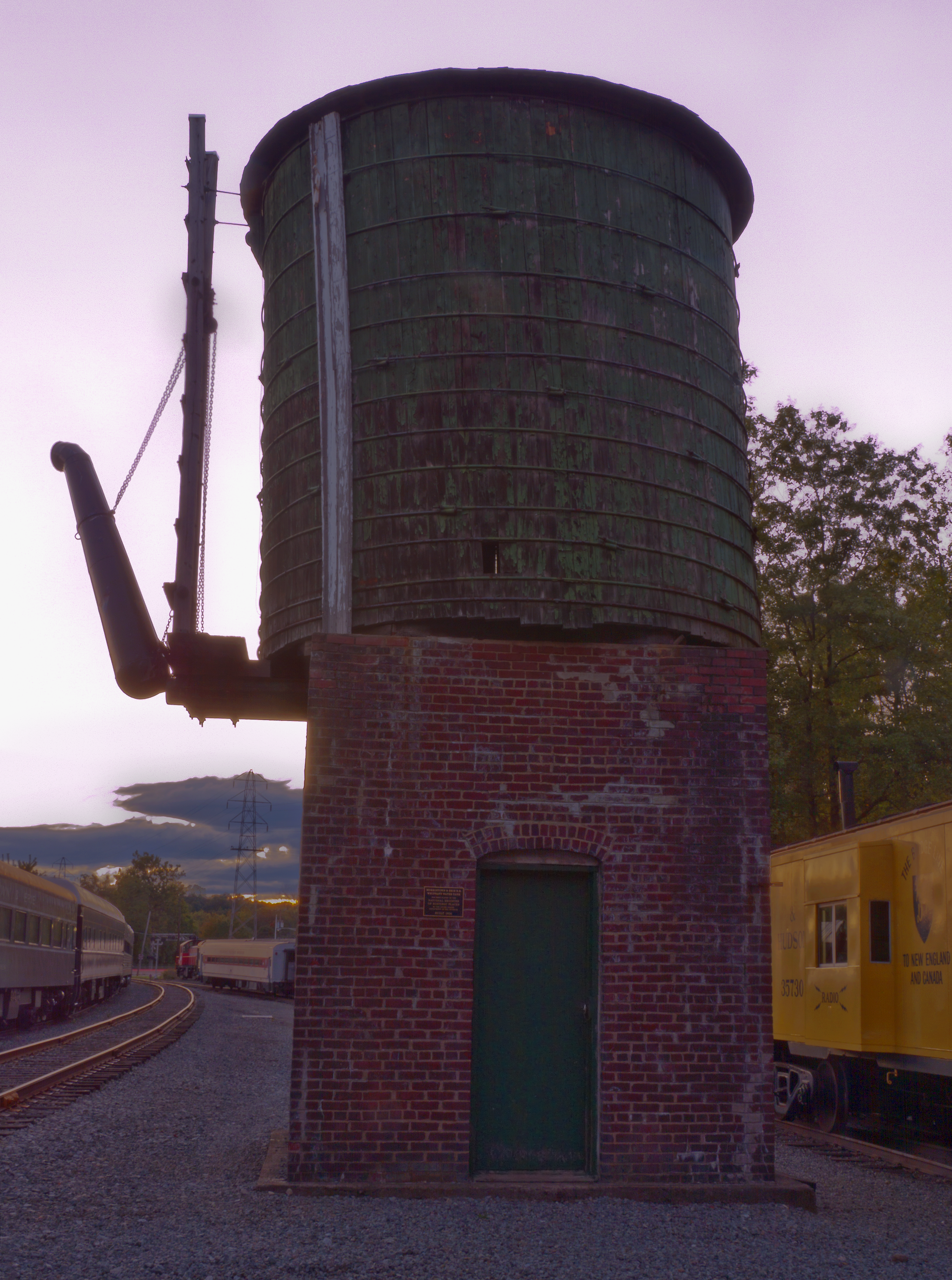

- Location within Morris County, New Jersey Location within New Jersey Location within the United States
- Location: 1 Railroad Plaza, NJ 10 West and Whippany Road, Hanover Township, New Jersey
- Coordinates: 40°49′31″N 74°24′46″W
- Area: less than one acre
- Built: 1904
- Architect: Woolford, G., Wood Tank Manft. Co.
- NRHP reference No.: 06000762
- NJRHP No.: 4408

Significant dates
- Added to NRHP: September 6, 2006
- Designated NJRHP: June 28, 2006

The Morristown and Erie Railroad Whippany Water Tank is located in Hanover Township, Morris County, New Jersey, United States. The water tank was built in 1904 by the Morristown and Erie Railroad and was added to the National Register of Historic Places on September 6, 2006.

== See also ==
- Whippany Railway Museum
- National Register of Historic Places listings in Morris County, New Jersey
- Operating Passenger Railroad Stations Thematic Resource (New Jersey)
