= Arrington, Virginia =

Unincorporated community in Virginia, United States

Coordinates: 37°41′03″N 78°54′04″W

Arrington is a census-designated place (CDP) in Nelson County, Virginia, United States. As of the 2020 census, Arrington had a population of 718.

Mitchell's Brick House Tavern was listed on the National Register of Historic Places in 2006.

== Climate ==
The climate in this area is characterized by hot, humid summers and generally mild to cool winters. According to the Köppen Climate Classification system, Arrington has a humid subtropical climate, abbreviated "Cfa" on climate maps.

== Demographics ==
Historical population
Census	Pop.	Note	%±
2020	718		—
U.S. Decennial Census; 2010 2020

Arrington was first listed as a census designated place in the 2010 U.S. census.
