= Piney River, Virginia =

Unincorporated community in Virginia, US

Coordinates: 37°42′19″N 79°01′23″W

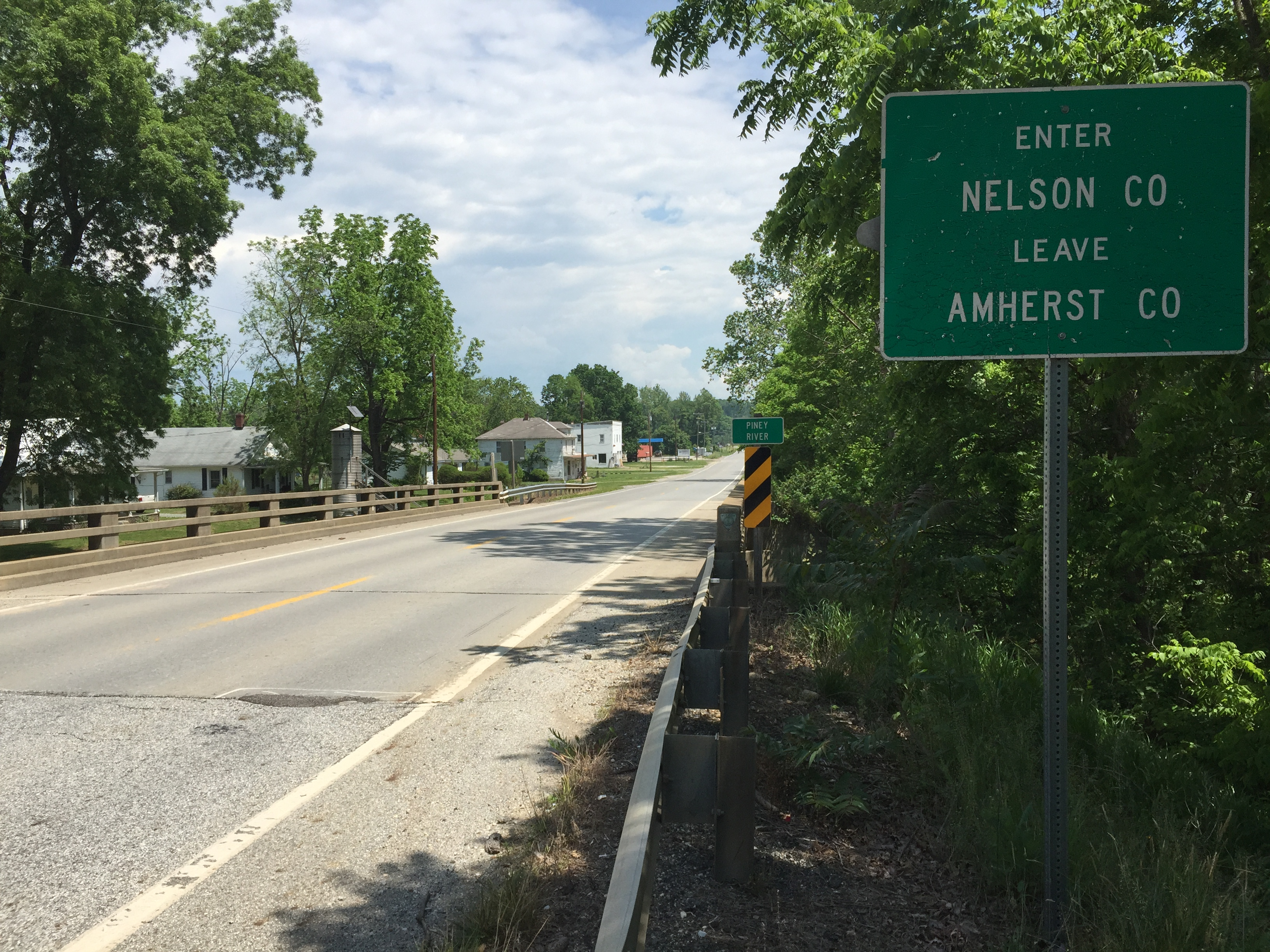
View north along Virginia State Route 151 (Patrick Henry Highway) as it crosses the Piney River from Amherst County, Virginia into the community of Piney River in Nelson County, Virginia

Piney River is an unincorporated community in Nelson County, Virginia, United States. It lies along the path of the now-defunct Virginia Blue Ridge Railway.
