= Beaufort station (New Jersey) =

Railway station in Roseland, New Jersey

Beaufort

General information
- Location: 10 Eisenhower Parkway (CR 609); Roseland, Essex County, New Jersey 07068
- Coordinates: 40°49′04″N 74°19′47″W
- System: M&E commuter rail station

History
- Opened: November 21, 1904
- Closed: April 29, 1928

Services
Preceding station	Morristown and Erie Railroad	Following station
Hanover toward Morristown	Main Line	Roseland toward Essex Fells
Location

Beaufort was a railway station on the Morristown and Erie Railway in Roseland, New Jersey in the United States. The same name is also rarely used for the neighborhood of southwestern Roseland near the former railway station. The station building currently is vacant, but formerly housed a lot for Transdev's operations in Essex County. That address is 10 Eisenhower Parkway in Roseland and is near the Livingston border. The Beaufort station was located not far from what is today Beaufort Avenue in Livingston. Before the Eisenhower Parkway was built Beaufort Avenue continued from Livingston to Eagle Rock Avenue in Roseland.

The station was started in 1904 when residents of the neighborhood constructed a wooden shed to serve as a station along the M&E, whose passengers were familiar with multiple flag stop stations along the line but wanted regularly scheduled service to their neighborhood. Eventually the Morristown and Erie Railway company constructed the station building that stands today. Passenger service along the line stopped in 1928.

== See also ==
- Becker Farm Railroad - miniature railway was nearby in Roseland
- Erie Railroad
- Morristown and Erie Railway
- Whippany Railway Museum
