= Virginia Blue Ridge Railway =

Overview
- Reporting mark: VBR
- Locale: Virginia
- Dates of operation: 1914–1980

Technical
- Track gauge: 4 ft 8 1/2 in (1,435 mm) standard gauge
- Length: 16 miles (26 km)

The Virginia Blue Ridge Railway (reporting mark VBR) was a historic intrastate short line railroad that operated in central Virginia in the 20th century.

== History ==
The company was incorporated on May 22, 1914, construction was started in 1915 and operated on 16 miles (26 km) of track. The VBR extended from Tye River Depot in Nelson County, where it interchanged with the Southern Railway, to Massies Mill. The railroad followed the course of the Tye and Piney Rivers for several miles before entering the mountains. It was initially built to haul chestnut for lumber out of the heavily-timbered Piney River area to local mills until World War I. The chestnut blight wiped out much of the timbered areas. However, the railroad later served several quarries in the area where titanium dioxide and aplite were mined. It passed through the communities of Roses Mill, Piney River, Canopy, Lowesville, and Buffalo Mine. Steam operations on the VBR ended on August 1, 1963, with ex-U.S. Army 0-6-0 #9 being the honor of pulling the last steam powered freight train.

The line was abandoned in 1981. In the early 21st century, part of the roadbed was being developed as a rails-to-trails project, the Blue Ridge Railway Trail.

== Locomotives ==
Locomotive details
| Number/Name | Type | Builder | Serial number | Built | Retired | Notes |
|---|---|---|---|---|---|---|
| 1 | 2-8-0 | H.K. Porter, Inc. | unknown | 1915 | 1953 | Bought new. Only locomotive purchased new by the VBR. Scrapped in 1953. |
| 2 (186) | 2-8-0 | Richmond Locomotive Works | 2472 | 1895 | 1947 | Ex-Southern Railway #222, later renumbered to #186. Sold to the VBR on September 22, 1938. During its time on the VBR, the engine was never relettered or renumbered. Scrapped in 1947. |
| 3 | 4-6-0 | Baldwin Locomotive Works | unknown | 1909 | 1946 | Originally built as Augusta Southern Railroad #73. Later sold to the Georgia and Florida Railroad as their #173. Sold to the VBR on November 10, 1941. Scrapped in 1946. |
| 1st #4 | 0-4-0ST | Vulcan Iron Works | unknown | 1909 | 1943 | Originally built as Old Dominion Soapstone Corporation #2. Continued service until December 1, 1931. Sold to the Alberene Stone Company. Sold to the VBR in June 1942 as their 1st #4 (more commonly known as Vulcan number 1436). Sold to Leas & McVitty Inc. in December 1943. Last used in the late 1950s. Sold to Charles Wassum in 1961 and was displayed in front of a motel in Marion, Virginia. It was eventually purchased by Will Harris, a private collector, who moved it to his property in Goshen, Virginia, where it continues to sit on display today (without its saddletank). |
| 2nd #4 | 0-6-0 | Baldwin Locomotive Works | 31899 | 10/1907 | 1951 | Originally built as Atlanta, Birmingham and Atlantic Railroad #58, later Atlanta, Birmingham & Coast #58 after November 1926. Later sold to Georgia Car & Locomotive who in turn sold her to the U.S. Army and numbered as #6961). Sold to the VBR in 1947 as their 2nd #4. Sold to the Mead Corporation in Lynchburg, Virginia, in May 1951 as their #300. Now at the Wilmington and Western Railroad in Wilmington, Delaware. |
| 5 | 0-6-0 | American Locomotive Company | unknown | 11/1942 | 8/1/1963 | Built as U.S. Army #4039. Sold to the VBR on February 17, 1947, as their #5. Retired on August 1, 1963. Sold to Earle Gil for use on the Morris County Central Railroad in late 1965 and entered service on August 27, 1966. Last used on the Morris County Central when it shut down in 1980. Now at the Whippany Railway Museum in Whippany, New Jersey awaiting restoration. |
| 6 | 2-8-0 | Baldwin Locomotive Works | 32312 | 11/1907 | 4/1/1959 | Originally built as Southern Railway #385. Sold to the VBR on November 17, 1952, as their #6 and became known as The Big Engine. Taken out of service in November 1956 due to heavy maintenance and officially retired on April 1, 1959. Sold to Earle Gil in 1963 and restored for use on the Morris County Central Railroad. Last ran on the MCC in 1978. Now at the Whippany Railway Museum in Whippany, New Jersey on static display. |
| 7 | 0-6-0 | Lima Locomotive Works | unknown | 1944 | 8/1/1963 | Built as U.S. Army #4061. Sold to the Norfolk & Portsmouth Belt Line Railroad in 1947 as their #51. Sold to the VBR on April 20, 1956. Retired on August 1, 1963, and later sold to Steam Trains Inc. who in turn sold it to one of the founders of Steam Trains Inc. Mr. Stout. In 1970, the locomotive was sold to another individual who, like Mr. Stout, didn't have a good relationship with Steam Trains Inc. In June 1976, the locomotive was scrapped and parts of the engine were used to restore other engines. |
| 8 | 0-6-0 | American Locomotive Company | unknown | 1942 | 8/1/1963 | Built as U.S. Army #4038. Later renumbered to 618 in 1954. Sold to the VBR in 1958 as their #8. Stored serviceable in early 1963. Sold to the Delaware Otsego Railroad in late 1965 and renumbered to #2. Remained in excursion service from 1966 until 1975. The engine is now under the ownership of Bill Miller. |
| 9 | 0-6-0 | American Locomotive Company | 70402 | 1942 | 8/1/1963 | Built as U.S. Army #4023. Later renumbered to 616 in 1954. Sold to the VBR in 1958 as their #9, however it was not used until March 23, 1961. Had the honor of pulling the last steam powered freight train on August 1, 1963. Sold to the New Hope & Ivyland Railroad in June 1967. Taken out of service in 1981. Now operational and owned by SMS Rail Lines in Bridgeport, New Jersey. |
| 10 | SW1 | Electro-Motive Diesel | 1051 | 1940 | still in service | Built as Lackawanna #430. Sold to the VBR in 1963 as their #10. Sold to the Union Tank Car Company as their #12226. Currently still in service in Marion, Ohio. |
| 11 | SW1 | Electro-Motive Division | unknown | 1940 | unknown | Built as Lackawanna #427. Sold to the VBR in 1963 as their #11. Dismantled for parts in 1973. Sent to the Railway Supply Company of Birmingham, Alabama in 1974 as a trade-in. Later sold to the Kaiser Chemical Company in Bainbridge, Georgia. As of 2006, it was reported to be in service at the Formosa Plastics facility in Baton Rouge, Louisiana. |
| 12 | SW1 | Electro-Motive Division | 1053 | 1940 | still in service | Built as Lackawanna #432, later renumbered to 354. Sold to the VBR on June 7, 1965, as their #12. Sold to the Union Tank Car Company in 1985 as their #12227. Still in operation today. |
