= Whippany Railway Museum =

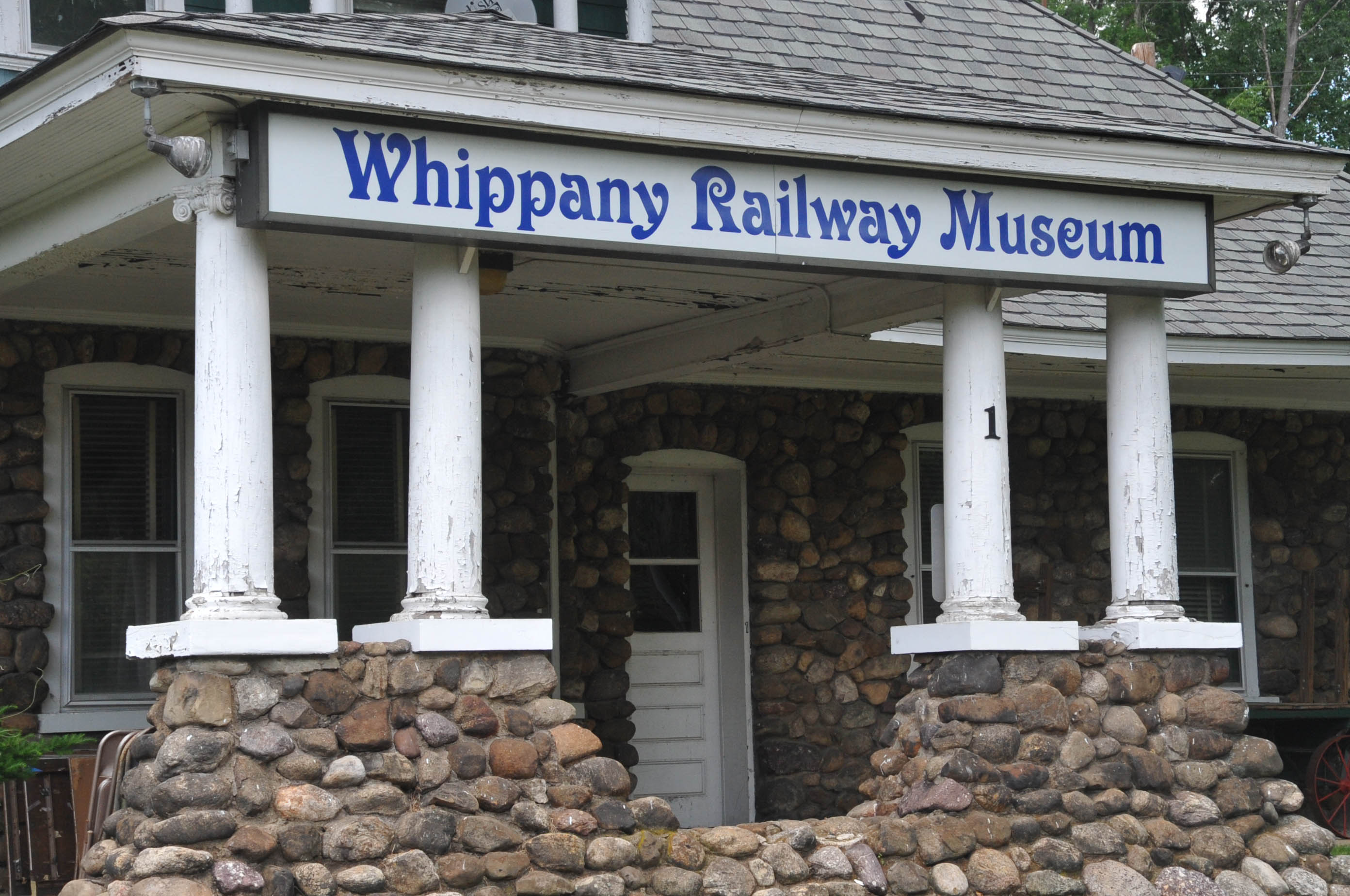

- Whippany Railway Museum
- Former name: Pequannock Valley Transportation Museum
- Established: 1965
- Location: Whippany, New Jersey
- Coordinates: 40.822917°N 74.412519°W
- Type: Railway museum
- Website: whippanyrailwaymuseum.net

The Whippany Railway Museum is a railway museum and excursion train ride located in the Whippany section of Hanover Township in Morris County, New Jersey, United States.

== History ==
The station depot at the Whippany Railway Museum opened on January 7, 1905.

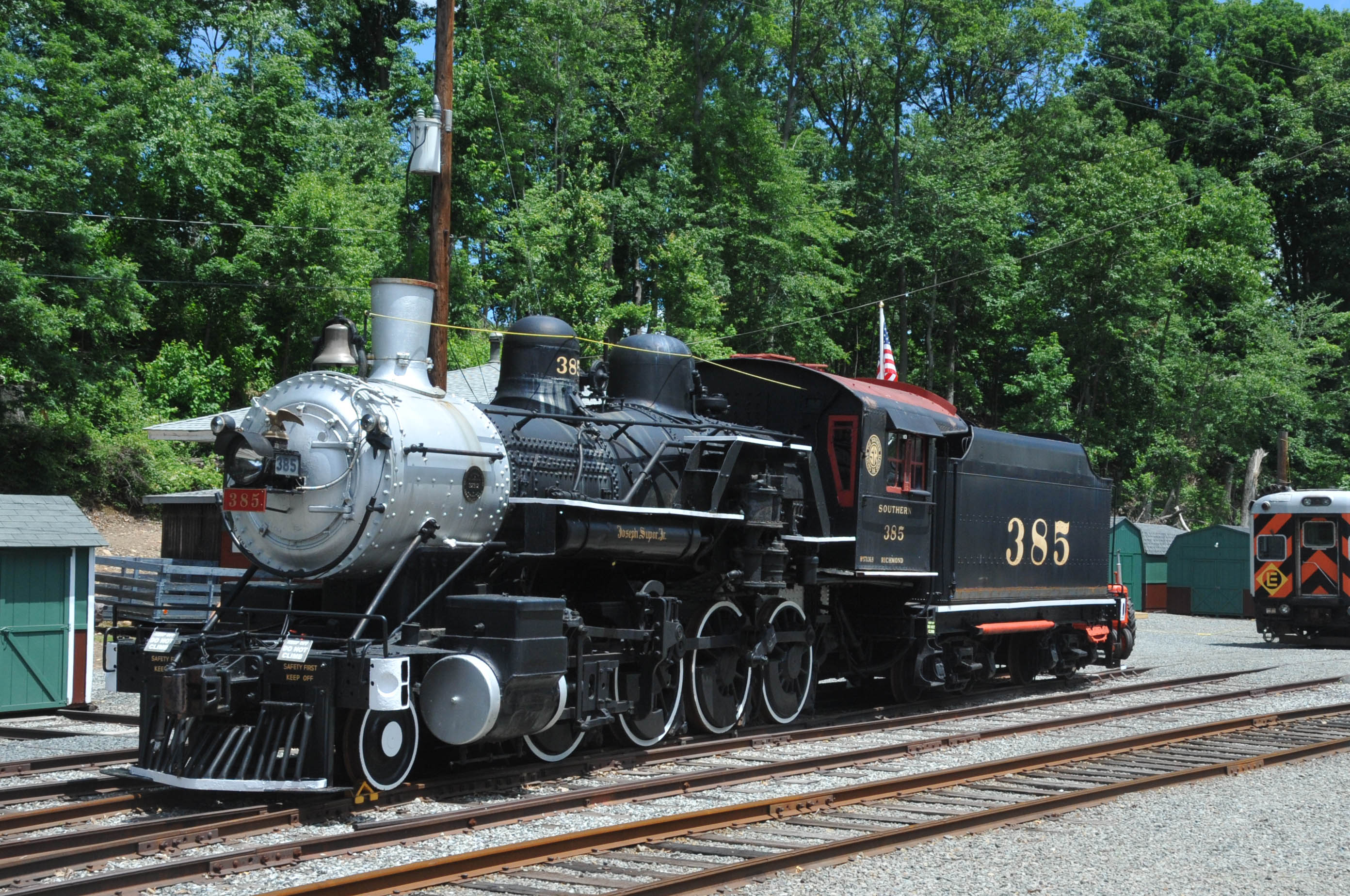
1907 Southern Railway train on display at Whippany Railway Museum.

In 1965, Whippany was the location of the Morris County Central Railroad, a steam excursion railroad. A group of employees of the Morris County Central Railroad came together to form the Morris County Central Railroad Museum and used half of the Morristown and Erie freight house. In 1967, the freight house was moved across the tracks to its present-day location. During the years from 1967 to 1973, the museum was visited by thousands of railfans who had come to ride the excursion trains. In 1973, due to financial pressures, the Morris County Central Railroad moved its operation to Newfoundland, NJ. One year later, the Morris County Central Railroad Museum also moved to a restored refrigerator car at the Newfoundland, NJ, location where it operated as the Pequannock Valley Transportation Museum (PVTM).

The tough economics of the late 1970s, as well as several serious acts of vandalism and arson to the railroad's equipment and its facilities, caused the closure of the railroad. Morris County Central Railroad ran its last train on December 14, 1980, in heavy snow. However, the museum stayed open.

In 1983, the members of the Pequannock Valley Transportation Museum began looking for a new site, preferably in a railroad structure. The freight house at Whippany was immediately considered, but it was in very bad shape, having suffered from the ravages of nature and time, as well as vandalism. The building was scheduled to be demolished but the members of the Pequannock Valley Transportation Museum began cleaning up the site, as well as restoring the freight house building itself. Restoration included lifting the building up and replacing its crumbling foundation. In January 1984, the PVTM moved the last of its property down to Whippany. During this time, the Museum was reorganized as the Whippany Railway Museum to better reflect its new location. Work continued throughout 1984 and 1985, refinishing and setting up displays, as well as creating a gift shop. Finally, on October 26, 1985, the Whippany Railway Museum had its grand opening.

The museum has continued to flourish at its Whippany location, as well as expanding its collection of New Jersey railroad history. In early 2011, the Whippany Museum was recognized for its efforts in the preservation of this history by a proclamation from the New Jersey State Assembly. This proclamation applauded the efforts of the volunteers who preserve the history of railroading in the state of New Jersey for future generations, as well as recognizing the events and excursion rides that are regularly hosted by the museum.

== Operations ==
The Whippany Railway Museum is open during Sundays from April through October, 12-4 PM. The museum runs several excursions all year round, with locomotives provided by the Morristown and Erie Railway, which powers all Whippany excursions.

Around March–April, it runs the Easter Bunny Express on two Sundays, consisting of several passenger cars. On four summer Sundays, it operates a caboose train consisting of the Jersey Coast Club car and several cabooses. In 2012, they added a Pumpkin-liner train on one Sunday in October, which is an add-on to an annual pumpkin festival at the museum. The museum used to run Christmas trains during December. However, starting in 2016, the Morristown and Erie began running their own Christmas excursion, The Polar Express. This loss has severely cut into the museums operations. In 2016, they appeared to add several family-friendly non-excursion activities, but those have since ended unexpectedly.

== Locomotives ==
Locomotive details
Builder	Model	Year built	Type	Current number	Former numbers (if applicable)	Operational status
Whitcomb Company	Whitcomb Model 20GM24 Industrial Switching Locomotive	1942	Gas Mechanical	151	US Army and others	Display
Baldwin Locomotive Works	2-8-0	1907	Steam	385	Southern Railway 385; Virginia Blue Ridge 6	Display
American Locomotive Company	0-6-0	1942	Steam	4039	U.S. Army 4039; Virginia Blue Ridge 5	Under restoration
H.K. Porter	0-4-0	1937	Steam	7240	Texaco Fireless Cooker 7240	Display

== Rolling stock ==
- Jersey Coast ex CNJ Club Car (built 1927)
- NJ Transit Comet 1 Car (built 1970 by Pullman Standard)

== See also ==
- Morristown and Erie Railroad Whippany Water Tank
