= Tye River, Virginia =

Unincorporated community in Virginia, US

Coordinates: 37°39′10″N 78°56′53″W

Tye River is an unincorporated community in Nelson County, Virginia, United States.
