= Nelson County, Virginia =

County in Virginia, United States

- County
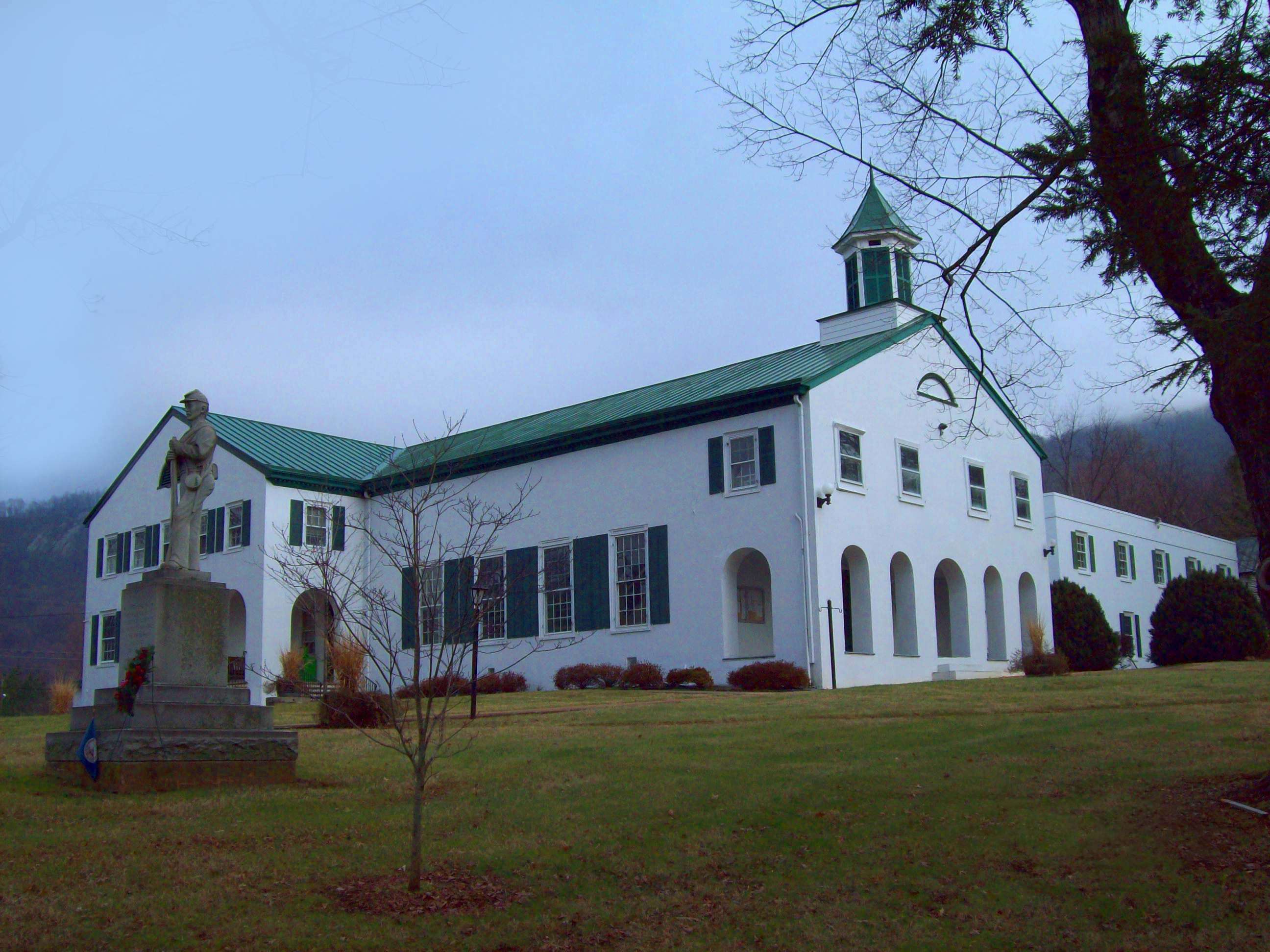
- Nelson County Courthouse

- Flag Seal

- Location within the U.S. state of Virginia
- Coordinates: 37°47′N 78°53′W
- Country: United States
- State: Virginia
- Founded: 1807
- Named for: Thomas Nelson Jr.
- Seat: Lovingston
- Largest community: Nellysford

Area
  - Total: 474 sq mi (1,230 km^{2})
  - Land: 471 sq mi (1,220 km^{2})
  - Water: 3.5 sq mi (9.1 km^{2}) 0.7%

Population (2020)
  - Total: 14,775
  - Estimate (2025): 14,920 ▲
  - Density: 31.4/sq mi (12.1/km^{2})
- Time zone: UTC−5 (Eastern)
  - Summer (DST): UTC−4 (EDT)
- Congressional district: 5th
- Website: www.nelsoncounty-va.gov

Nelson County is a county located in the Commonwealth of Virginia, in the United States. As of the 2020 census, the population was 14,775. Its county seat is Lovingston. Nelson County is part of the Charlottesville metropolitan area.

== History ==
At the time the English began settling Virginia in the 1600s, the inhabitants of what is now Nelson County were members of a Siouan-speaking tribe, the Nahyssan. It is likely they were connected to the Manahoac.

Nelson County was created in 1807 from Amherst County. The government was formed the following year. The county is named for Thomas Nelson Jr., a signer of the U.S. Declaration of Independence, who served as Governor of Virginia in 1781. An earlier Virginia county, also named in his honor, became part of Kentucky when it separated from Virginia in 1792.

=== Hurricane Camille ===
On the night of August 19–20, 1969, Nelson County was struck by disastrous flooding caused by Hurricane Camille. The hurricane hit the Gulf Coast two days earlier, weakened over land, and stalled on the eastern side of the Blue Ridge Mountains, dumping a world-record quantity of 27 inches (690 mm) of rain, mainly in a three-hour period. Over five hours, it yielded more than 37 inches (940 mm), while the previous day had seen a deluge of 5 inches (130 mm) in half an hour, with the ground already saturated. There were reports of animals drowning in trees and people who needed to cup their hands around their mouth and nose to breathe.

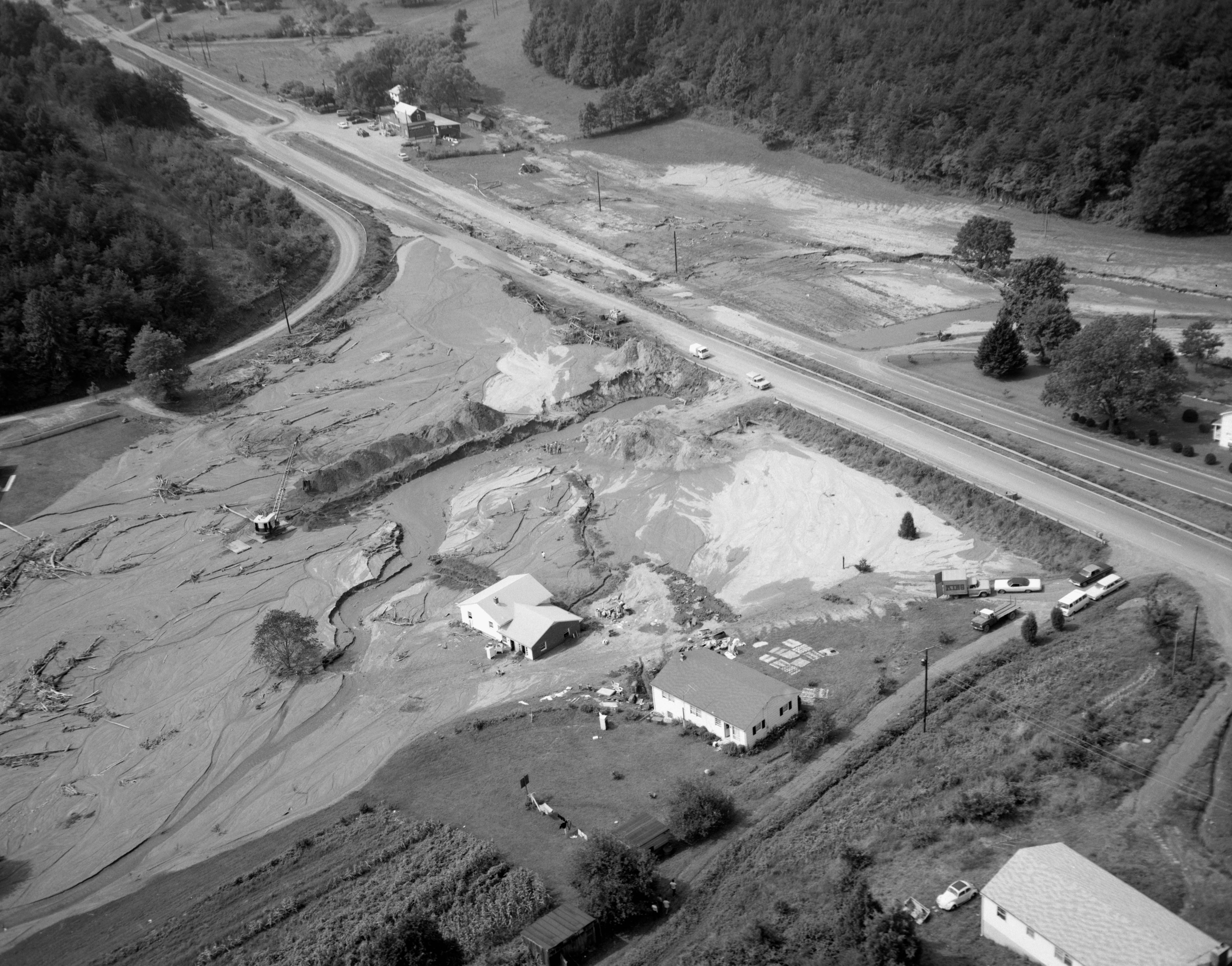
Mudslide damage in Nelson County after the passage of Hurricane Camille

Flash floods and mudslides killed 153 people, 31 from Roseland, Tyro, and Massies Mill alone. Over 133 public bridges were washed out in Nelson County, while some communities were under water. In the tiny community of Davis Creek, 52 people were killed or could not be found; only 3 of 35 homes were left standing after the floodwaters receded. The bodies of some people have never been found; others washed as much as 25 miles (40 km) downstream along the creeks and rivers. The entire county was virtually cut off, with many roads and virtually all bridges, telephone, radio, TV, and electric service interrupted.

The waters of the Tye, Piney, Buffalo, and Rockfish rivers flow into the James River. There was severe flooding elsewhere in Virginia, such as along the Maury River, which destroyed the town of Glasgow in Rockbridge County.

The James River and its tributaries normally drain Nelson County, but in the face of unusually high flooding from other tributaries such as Hatt Creek (along the James River some 80 miles (130 km) to the east) the James River crested more than 20 feet (6.1 m) above flood stage at Westham, as Nelson County citizens watched portions of houses and other buildings, bodies, and dead livestock flow past. Just a few miles further downstream, the James River crested at the City Locks in Richmond at 28.6 feet (8.7 m) swamping downtown areas and also flooding a substantial portion of South Richmond (formerly the separate city of Manchester). The Hurricane Camille disaster did over $140 million (in 1969 dollars) in damage across Virginia, however in no other place in Virginia was the storm as devastating and deadly as in Nelson County, where one percent of the population was killed and where many bodies were never recovered. Visitors to Nelson County can participate on a self-guided tour of notable locations related to Hurricane Camille. There are exhibits dedicated to Hurricane Camille at the Oakland Museum.

== Geology ==
Nelsonite, the Virginia state rock, is named for Nelson County. Nelsonite is a distinctive igneous rock composed primarily of the minerals ilmenite and apatite, and as such it's rich in both titanium and calcium phosphate.

== Geography ==
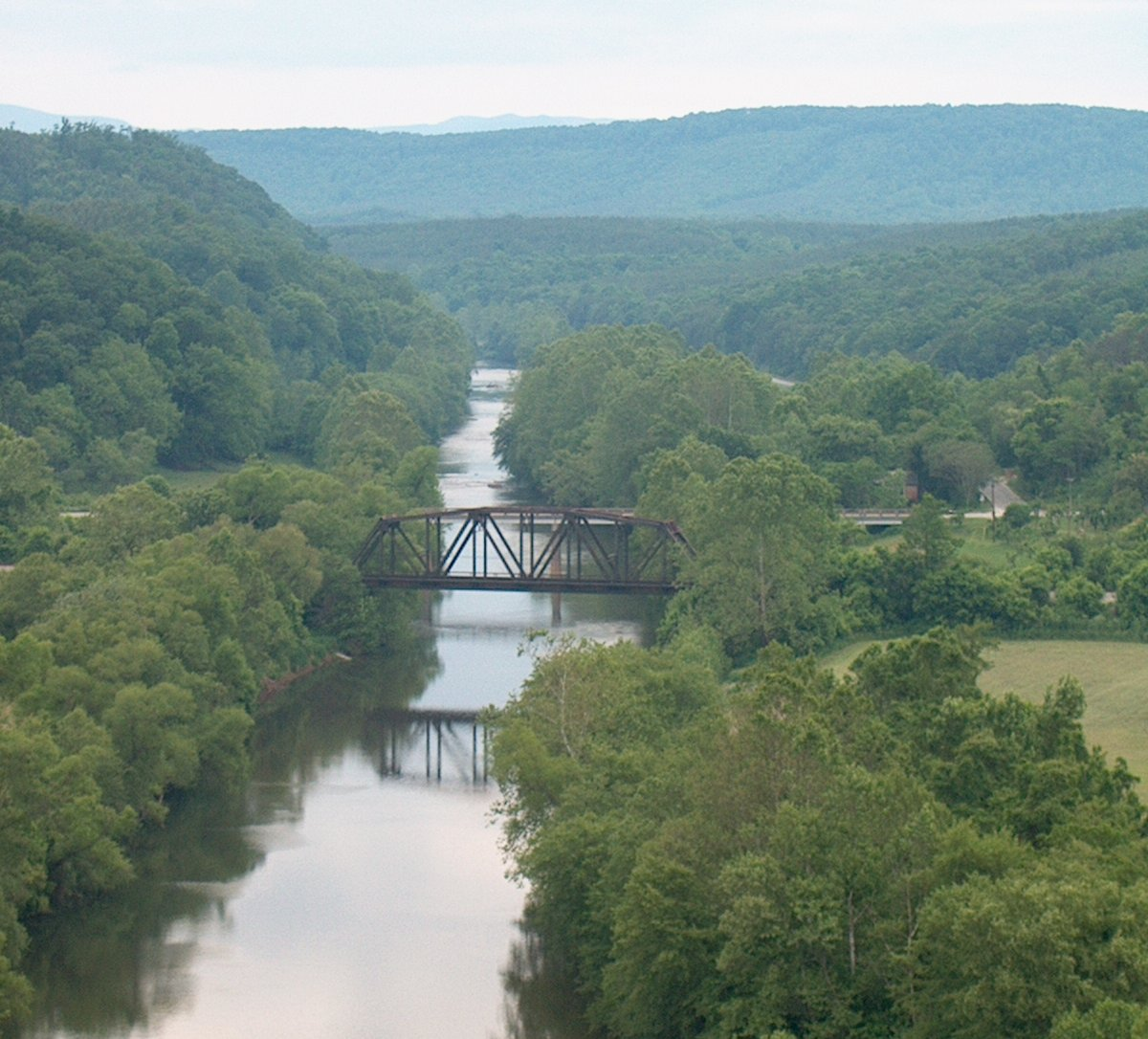
The Tye River flows through the mountains and low hills of Nelson County.

According to the U.S. Census Bureau, the county has a total area of 474 square miles (1,230 km^{2}), of which 471 square miles (1,220 km^{2}) is land and 3.5 square miles (9.1 km^{2}) (0.7%) is water. The Blue Ridge Mountains form the northwest boundary of the county; the James River forms the boundary to the southeast. Internally, Nelson consists of the Rockfish, Tye and Piney rivers, along with many known creeks.

=== Adjacent counties ===
- Augusta County – northwest
- Albemarle County – northeast
- Buckingham County – southeast
- Appomattox County – south
- Amherst County – southwest
- Rockbridge County – west

== Nearby towns and cities ==
- Charlottesville
- Lynchburg
- Waynesboro

=== National protected areas ===
- Blue Ridge Parkway (part)
- George Washington National Forest (part)
- United States National Radio Quiet Zone (part)

=== Major highways ===
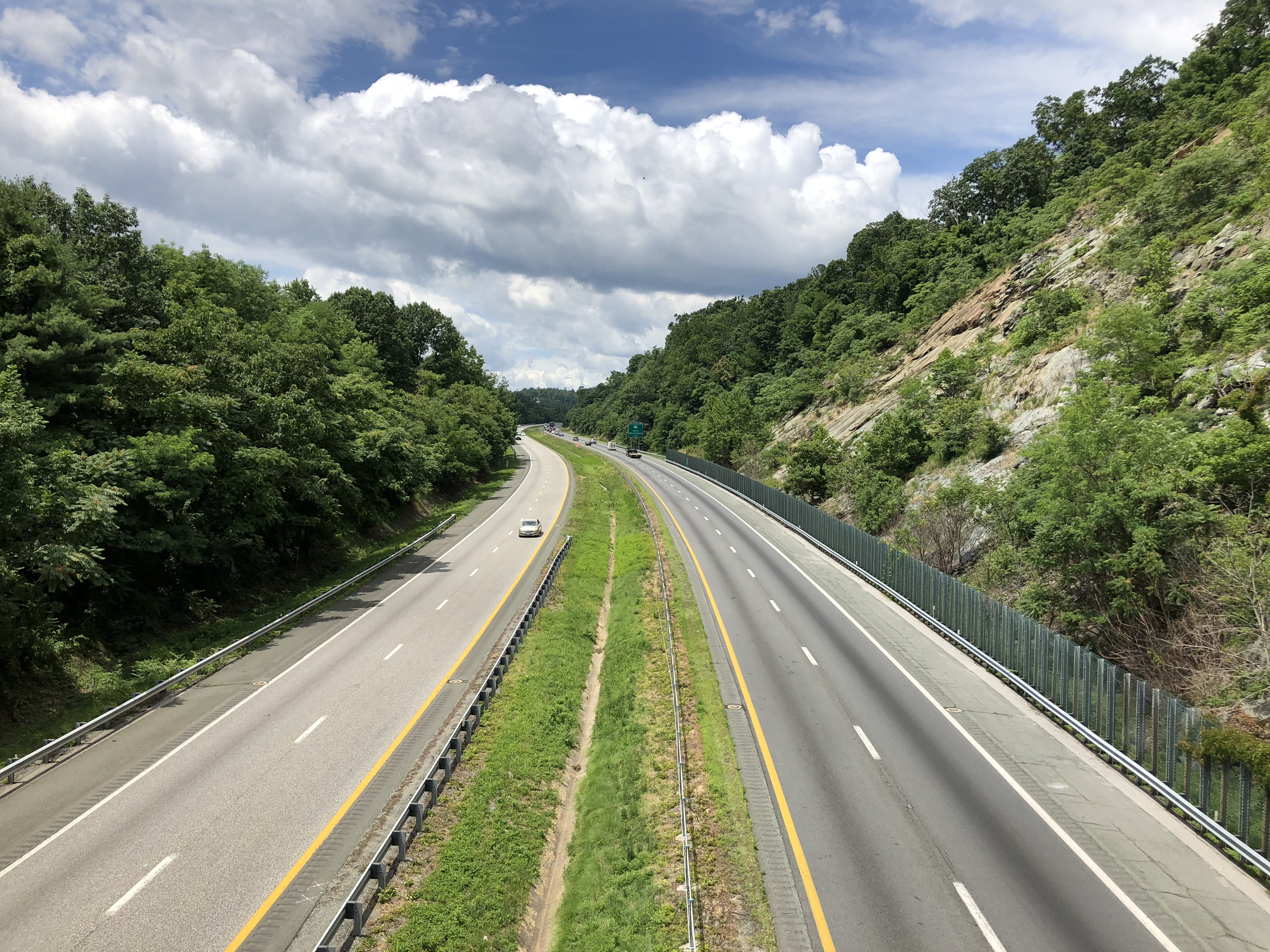
I-64 in Nelson County

- I-64 (extreme northern Nelson County)
- US 29 (Thomas Nelson Highway)
- US 60 (Richmond Highway)
- US 250 (Rockfish Gap Turnpike)
- SR 6 (Afton Mountain Road; River Road; joins US 29)
- SR 56 (Crabtree Falls Highway; Tye Brook Highway; joins US 29 and US BUS 29 in Lovingston; James River Road)
- SR 151 (Patrick Henry Highway; Rockfish Valley Highway)
- Blue Ridge Parkway

== Education ==
Nelson County Public Schools is a Virginia public school division. It operates two elementary schools, one middle school, and one high school (Nelson County High School). The middle and high schools are connected and located just outside Lovingston, Virginia. Nelson County also provides free GED testing to all adults.

Jefferson-Madison Regional Library is the regional library system that provides services to the citizens of Nelson County.

== Demographics ==
Historical population
| Census | Pop. | Note | %± |
|---|---|---|---|
| 1810 | 9,684 | | — |
| 1820 | 10,137 | | 4.7% |
| 1830 | 11,254 | | 11.0% |
| 1840 | 12,287 | | 9.2% |
| 1850 | 12,758 | | 3.8% |
| 1860 | 13,015 | | 2.0% |
| 1870 | 13,898 | | 6.8% |
| 1880 | 16,536 | | 19.0% |
| 1890 | 15,336 | | −7.3% |
| 1900 | 16,075 | | 4.8% |
| 1910 | 16,821 | | 4.6% |
| 1920 | 17,277 | | 2.7% |
| 1930 | 16,345 | | −5.4% |
| 1940 | 16,241 | | −0.6% |
| 1950 | 14,042 | | −13.5% |
| 1960 | 12,752 | | −9.2% |
| 1970 | 11,702 | | −8.2% |
| 1980 | 12,204 | | 4.3% |
| 1990 | 12,778 | | 4.7% |
| 2000 | 14,445 | | 13.0% |
| 2010 | 15,020 | | 4.0% |
| 2020 | 14,775 | | −1.6% |
| 2025 (est.) | 14,920 | ▲ | 1.0% |
U.S. decennial census 1790–1960 1900–1990; 1990–2000 2010 2020

=== Racial and ethnic composition ===
Nelson County, Virginia – Racial and ethnic composition Note: the US Census treats Hispanic/Latino as an ethnic category. This table excludes Latinos from the racial categories and assigns them to a separate category. Hispanics/Latinos may be of any race.
| Race / Ethnicity (NH = Non-Hispanic) | Pop 1980 | Pop 1990 | Pop 2000 | Pop 2010 | Pop 2020 | % 1980 | % 1990 | % 2000 | % 2010 | % 2020 |
|---|---|---|---|---|---|---|---|---|---|---|
| White alone (NH) | 9,205 | 10,219 | 11,765 | 12,283 | 11,879 | 75.43% | 79.97% | 81.45% | 81.78% | 80.40% |
| Black or African American alone (NH) | 2,882 | 2,395 | 2,136 | 1,941 | 1,526 | 23.62% | 18.74% | 14.79% | 12.92% | 10.33% |
| Native American or Alaska Native alone (NH) | 8 | 14 | 25 | 43 | 47 | 0.07% | 0.11% | 0.17% | 0.29% | 0.32% |
| Asian alone (NH) | 6 | 24 | 32 | 66 | 67 | 0.05% | 0.19% | 0.22% | 0.44% | 0.45% |
| Native Hawaiian or Pacific Islander alone (NH) | x | x | 7 | 4 | 2 | x | x | 0.05% | 0.03% | 0.01% |
| Other race alone (NH) | 4 | 8 | 12 | 23 | 68 | 0.03% | 0.06% | 0.08% | 0.15% | 0.46% |
| Mixed race or Multiracial (NH) | x | x | 163 | 201 | 523 | x | x | 1.13% | 1.34% | 3.54% |
| Hispanic or Latino (any race) | 99 | 118 | 305 | 459 | 663 | 0.81% | 0.92% | 2.11% | 3.06% | 4.49% |
| Total | 12,204 | 12,778 | 14,445 | 15,020 | 14,775 | 100.00% | 100.00% | 100.00% | 100.00% | 100.00% |

=== 2020 census ===
As of the 2020 census, the county had a population of 14,775. The median age was 52.0 years. 16.8% of residents were under the age of 18 and 28.9% of residents were 65 years of age or older. For every 100 females there were 96.9 males, and for every 100 females age 18 and over there were 94.2 males age 18 and over.

The racial makeup of the county was 81.4% White, 10.4% Black or African American, 0.4% American Indian and Alaska Native, 0.5% Asian, 0.0% Native Hawaiian and Pacific Islander, 2.5% from some other race, and 4.9% from two or more races. Hispanic or Latino residents of any race comprised 4.5% of the population.

0.0% of residents lived in urban areas, while 100.0% lived in rural areas.

There were 6,466 households in the county, of which 22.3% had children under the age of 18 living with them and 25.1% had a female householder with no spouse or partner present. About 29.0% of all households were made up of individuals and 15.6% had someone living alone who was 65 years of age or older.

There were 9,871 housing units, of which 34.5% were vacant. Among occupied housing units, 78.7% were owner-occupied and 21.3% were renter-occupied. The homeowner vacancy rate was 2.1% and the rental vacancy rate was 10.9%.

=== 2010 census ===
As of the census of 2010, there were 15,020 people, 6,396 households, and 4,302 families residing in the county. The population density was 31.9 people per square mile (12.3 people/km^{2}). There were 8,554 housing units at an average density of 18 units per square mile (6.9 units/km^{2}). The racial makeup of the county was 83.3% White, 13.1% Black or African American, 0.3% Native American, 0.5% Asian, Z% Pacific Islander, 1.1% from other races, and 1.7% from two or more races. Hispanic or Latino people of any race were 3.1% of the population.

There were 6,396 households, out of which 21.6% had children under the age of 18 living with them, 51.6% were married couples living together, 11.1% had a female householder with no husband present, and 32.7% were non-families. 27.4% of all households were made up of individuals, and 11.1% had someone living alone who was 65 years of age or older. The average household size was 2.33 and the average family size was 2.81.

In the county, the population was spread out, with 19.3% under the age of 18, 5.7% from 18 to 24, 25.5% from 25 to 44, 29.60% from 45 to 64, and 19.9% who were 65 years of age or older. The median age was 42.8 years. For every 100 females there were 95.2 males. For every 100 females aged 18 and over, there were 93 males.

The median income for a household in the county was $48,118, and the median income for a family was $57,356. Males had a median income of $45,222 versus $34,842 for females. The per capita income for the county was $26,996. About 8.9% of families and 11.9% of the population were below the poverty line, including 13.8% of those under the age of 18 and 9.5% ages 65 or older.

== Recreation ==
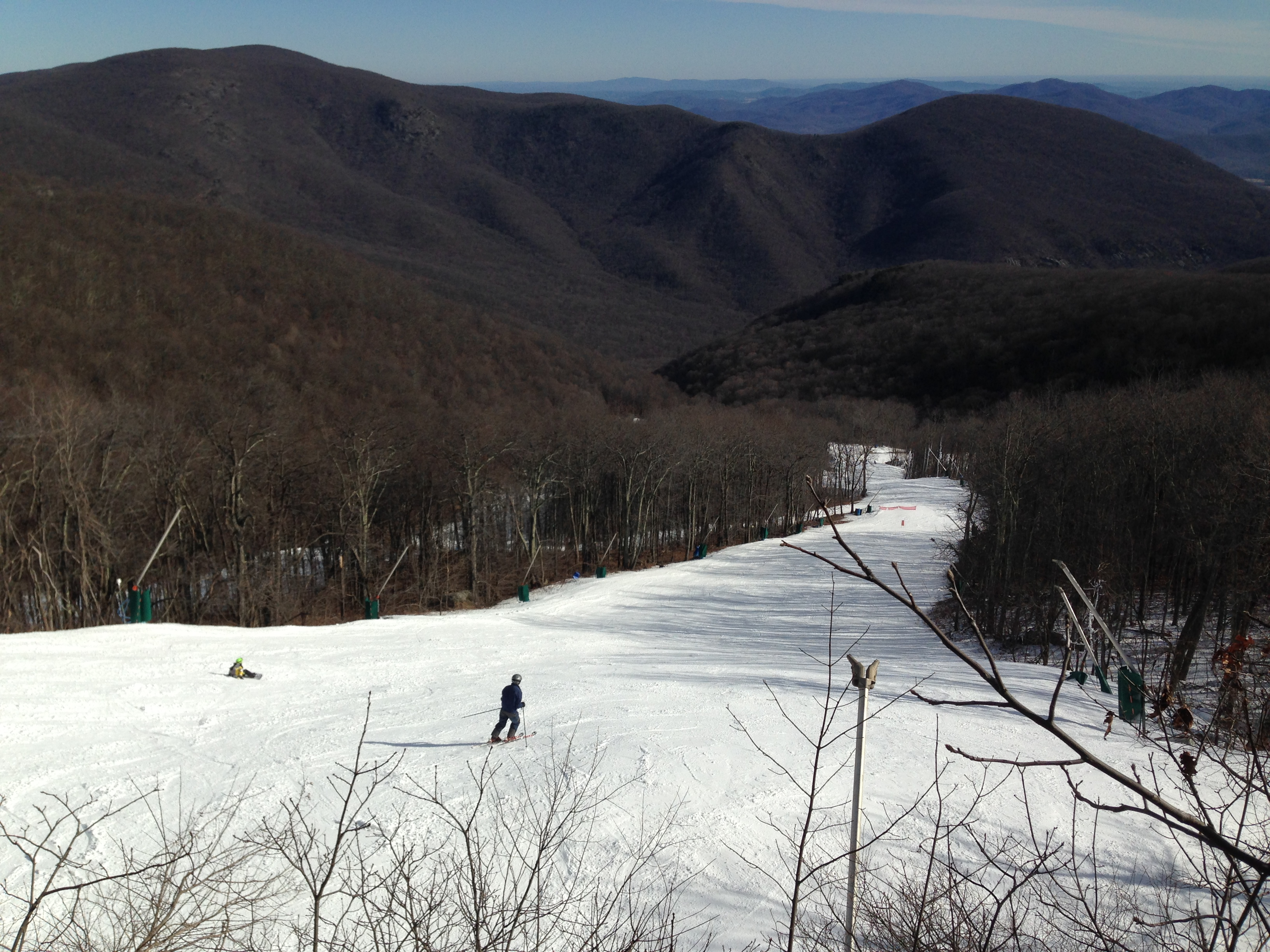
A view down a ski slope at Wintergreen Resort, Nelson County, Virginia

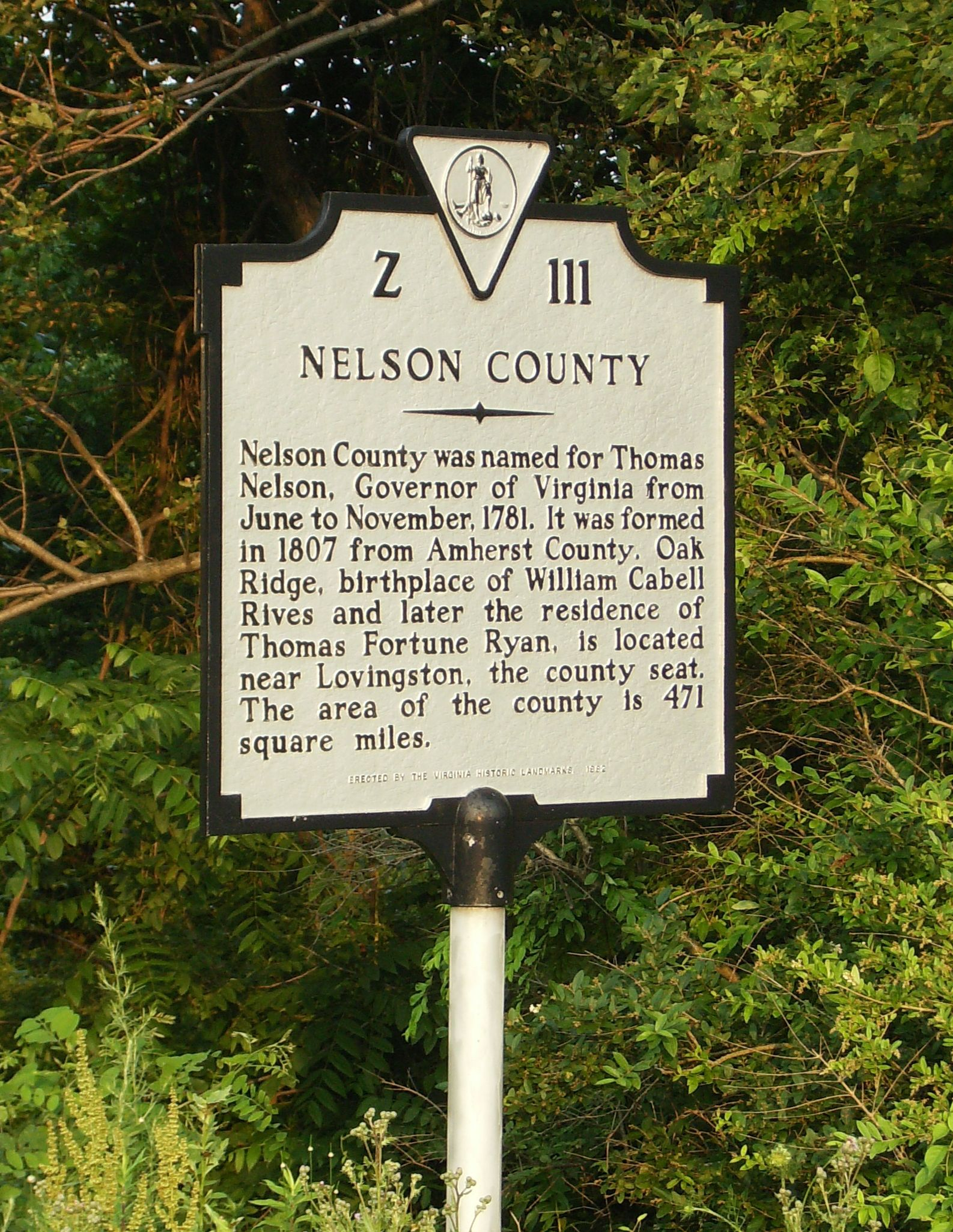
Historical marker on Route 250 heading east over Afton Mountain

Scenic Drives are popular in Nelson County. Visitors to the county can enjoy mountain views from The Blue Ridge Parkway. The Nelson Scenic Loop is 50 miles long and comprises Route 151, Route 664, the Blue Ridge Parkway, and Route 56.

The Wintergreen Resort near Nellysford opened in 1975. A planned development begun in 1969, it offers 45 holes of championship golf, seasonal skiing, snowboarding and snowtubing. On the eastern slope of the Blue Ridge, Wintergreen is a "top-down" resort in which practically all of the amenities are built on the peaks and ridges, rather than at the base like a traditional ski resort.

Sections of the former Virginia Blue Ridge Railway along the Tye River are now part of the Blue Ridge Railway Trail, which was under development in the early 21st century. The trail will eventually connect the James River with the Blue Ridge Parkway and the Appalachian Trail.

Another railway trail is the Blue Ridge Tunnel, a historic railroad tunnel designed by Claudius Crozet and built during the construction of the Blue Ridge Railroad in the 1850s. Abandoned during World War II and converted to a foot/bike trail in the 2020s, a walk through the tunnel is about 2.5 miles long. The tunnel will be part of a greenway system connecting three counties. The tunnel runs through Afton Mountain under Rockfish Gap. The Appalachian Trail, Interstate 64, and US Route 250 run above it. The eastern portal is in Nelson County.

Fishing and camping are popular activities in Nelson County. Sections of the Tye River are also popular for whitewater boating with canoes and kayaks. The rapids are rated Class I to Class II+. Depending on water conditions, some rapids on the Tye River can approach class III.

The first annual Lockn' Music Festival was held September 5–8, 2013 on a farm in Nelson County near Arrington, Virginia.

Camp Jeep was held at the Oak Ridge Estate in Arrington for several years beginning in 1999, with the last event taking place in 2007.

== Attractions ==
Nelson County is home to Swannanoa mansion. It is the location of Walton's Mountain, made famous by the television show The Waltons. Nelson County is also home to 12 wineries and vineyards, seven craft breweries, three cideries, three distilleries, six fruit orchards as well as Crabtree Falls and White Rock Falls. Nelson County offers The Quarry Gardens, Pharsalia, and the local library's flower gardens for gardening enthusiasts.

== Communities ==
There are no cities or incorporated towns in Nelson County. It consists of unincorporated communities, including the census-designated places (CDPs) of Afton, Arrington, Lovingston, Nellysford, Schuyler, Shipman, and Wintergreen.

== Politics ==
Nelson County is very competitive in presidential elections. The last time any candidate exceeded 55% of the vote was in 1984, when Ronald Reagan carried the county in his 49-state landslide.

United States presidential election results for Nelson County, Virginia
| Year | Republican | | Democratic | | Third party(ies) | |
| Year | No. | % | No. | % | No. | % |
|---|---|---|---|---|---|---|
| 1912 | 163 | 16.79% | 706 | 72.71% | 102 | 10.50% |
| 1916 | 249 | 18.98% | 1,063 | 81.02% | 0 | 0.00% |
| 1920 | 392 | 28.68% | 973 | 71.18% | 2 | 0.15% |
| 1924 | 350 | 24.46% | 1,042 | 72.82% | 39 | 2.73% |
| 1928 | 618 | 33.70% | 1,216 | 66.30% | 0 | 0.00% |
| 1932 | 238 | 13.98% | 1,457 | 85.61% | 7 | 0.41% |
| 1936 | 370 | 23.46% | 1,204 | 76.35% | 3 | 0.19% |
| 1940 | 330 | 20.30% | 1,291 | 79.40% | 5 | 0.31% |
| 1944 | 427 | 23.47% | 1,390 | 76.42% | 2 | 0.11% |
| 1948 | 371 | 21.31% | 1,204 | 69.16% | 166 | 9.53% |
| 1952 | 740 | 37.56% | 1,222 | 62.03% | 8 | 0.41% |
| 1956 | 764 | 37.20% | 1,215 | 59.15% | 75 | 3.65% |
| 1960 | 775 | 34.17% | 1,480 | 65.26% | 13 | 0.57% |
| 1964 | 893 | 35.24% | 1,635 | 64.52% | 6 | 0.24% |
| 1968 | 1,130 | 32.98% | 1,120 | 32.69% | 1,176 | 34.33% |
| 1972 | 2,145 | 67.22% | 954 | 29.90% | 92 | 2.88% |
| 1976 | 1,516 | 37.65% | 2,426 | 60.24% | 85 | 2.11% |
| 1980 | 1,866 | 41.50% | 2,410 | 53.60% | 220 | 4.89% |
| 1984 | 2,777 | 57.22% | 2,021 | 41.64% | 55 | 1.13% |
| 1988 | 2,502 | 51.60% | 2,272 | 46.86% | 75 | 1.55% |
| 1992 | 2,159 | 38.99% | 2,586 | 46.70% | 793 | 14.32% |
| 1996 | 1,988 | 37.77% | 2,782 | 52.85% | 494 | 9.38% |
| 2000 | 2,913 | 47.40% | 2,907 | 47.31% | 325 | 5.29% |
| 2004 | 3,539 | 49.57% | 3,543 | 49.63% | 57 | 0.80% |
| 2008 | 3,647 | 44.84% | 4,391 | 53.99% | 95 | 1.17% |
| 2012 | 3,947 | 47.84% | 4,171 | 50.56% | 132 | 1.60% |
| 2016 | 4,154 | 49.94% | 3,689 | 44.35% | 475 | 5.71% |
| 2020 | 4,812 | 51.65% | 4,327 | 46.45% | 177 | 1.90% |
| 2024 | 5,004 | 53.06% | 4,298 | 45.58% | 128 | 1.36% |

== Notable people ==
- Leslie Bibb, actress and model.
- Rita Mae Brown, social activist for gay and lesbian rights and award-winning author.
- Edward Coles, secretary to James Madison and second governor of Illinois; inherited Rockfish plantation in Nelson County and in June 1819 manumitted (freed) the slaves he brought from that plantation on the Ohio River near Pittsburgh, Pennsylvania on their joint way to the Illinois Territory.
- Eli Cook, blues singer, songwriter, guitarist and record producer.
- DeLane Fitzgerald, head football coach at NCAA D1 Southern Utah University.
- Jimmy Fortune, former tenor for the Statler Brothers; member of the Gospel and Country Music Hall of Fame.
- Reverend Dr. William Archer Rutherfoord Goodwin, grew up in Nelson County during the Reconstruction era after the American Civil War; priest and rector; created Colonial Williamsburg beginning in 1926.
- Earl Hamner Jr., born and raised in Schuyler; writer best known for the Emmy-winning CBS television series The Waltons, was based on his experiences of growing up in a large rural family in Depression-era America.
- Dr. Gessner Harrison, established Locust Grove Academy in 1860 as a boarding school for boys in the northernmost part of the county.
- Walter Loving, commander of the Philippine Constabulary Band; first black American to direct a musical performance at the White House.
- William Porcher Miles, South Carolina-born states' rights advocate; former U.S. and Confederate congressman; briefly managed Oak Ridge Plantation near Lovingston after the Civil War.
- Robert Monroe, out-of-body experience researcher who founded the Monroe Institute; lived in Faber.
- Thomas Massie, military officer during the American Revolution and Virginia planter.
- James Leroy Murrill, last Confederate veteran of the Civil War.
- William Rives, tobacco magnate; built Oak Ridge plantation near Lovingston.
- Thomas Fortune Ryan, born near Lovingston; bought Oak Ridge plantation after becoming rich in New York City by consolidating transportation and tobacco companies.

== See also ==
- National Register of Historic Places listings in Nelson County, Virginia
