= Virginia State Route 56 =

State highway in Virginia, United States

State Route 56

Route information
- Maintained by VDOT
- Length: 60.87 mi (97.96 km)
- Existed: 1930–present
- Tourist routes: Virginia Byway

Major junctions
- West end: US 11 / SR 851 at Steeles Tavern
- US 29 in Lovingston
- East end: US 60 at Alcoma

Location
- Country: United States
- State: Virginia
- Counties: Augusta, Rockbridge, Nelson, Buckingham

Highway system
- Virginia Routes; Interstate; US; Primary; Secondary; Byways; History; HOT lanes
← SR 55	→ SR 57

State Route 56 (SR 56) is a primary state highway in the U.S. state of Virginia. The state highway runs 60.87 miles (97.96 km) from U.S. Route 11 (US 11) at Steeles Tavern east to US 60 near Buckingham. SR 56 is the main east–west highway of Nelson County. The state highway connects the county seat of Lovingston with Buckingham to the east and the Blue Ridge Mountains and the Shenandoah Valley to the west.

== Route description ==
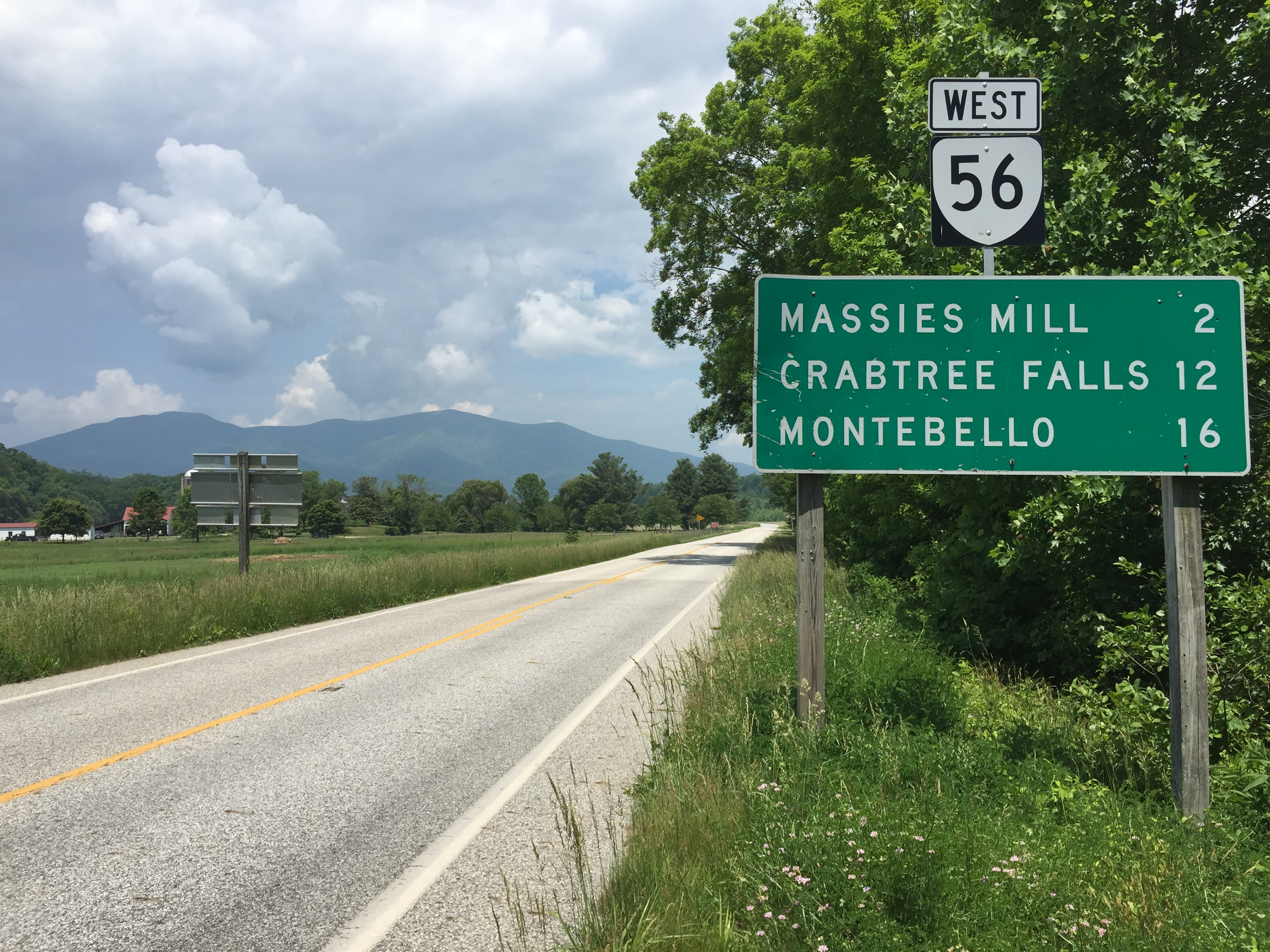
View west along SR 56 west of SR 151 near Roseland

SR 56 begins at an intersection with US 11 (Lee Highway) at Steeles Tavern a short distance east of the historic Cyrus McCormick Farm. The junction is just north of the Augusta–Rockbridge county line. SR 56 heads southeast into Rockbridge County as Tye River Turnpike, which enters George Washington National Forest and passes under Norfolk Southern Railway's Roanoke District at the village of Vesuvius. The state highway follows Little Marys Creek along its winding ascent of the Blue Ridge Mountains. SR 56 intersects the Blue Ridge Parkway at Tye River Gap, where the highway enters Nelson County and becomes Crabtree Falls Highway. The state highway descends through Montebello and follows the South Fork of the Tye River past Crabtree Falls to Nash, where the highway begins to follow the Tye River proper.

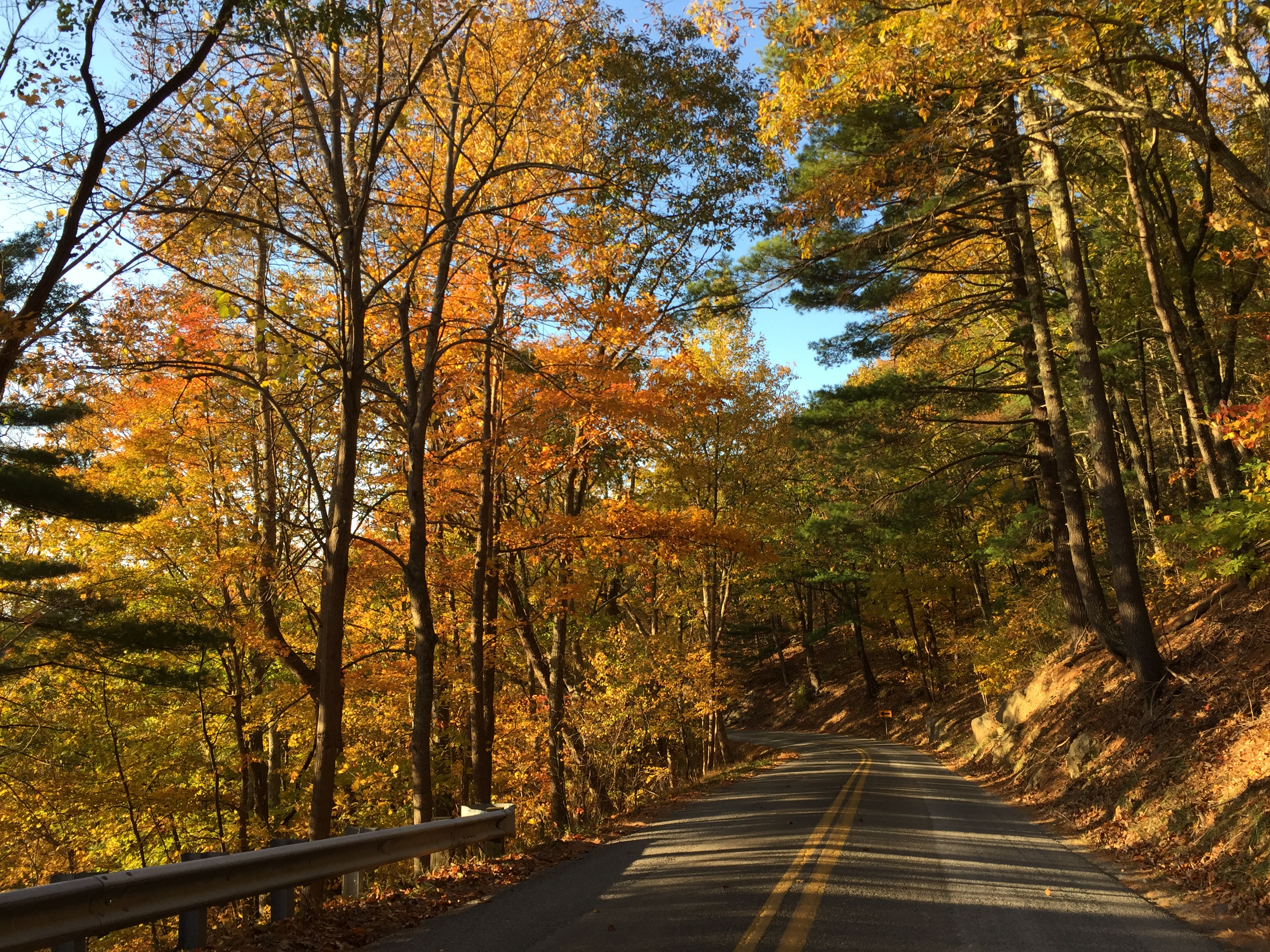
View west along SR 56 in Rockbridge County during autumn

SR 56 leaves the national forest and enters more gentle terrain just west of Tyro, the site of the Tyro Mill. The state highway follows the Tye River through Massies Mill to Roseland, where the highway turns south to join SR 151 on Patrick Henry Highway. The two highways run through the hamlet of Hendersons Store to just north of Piney River, where the highways diverge at a wye intersection; the short connector between SR 151 south and SR 56 east is SR 151Y. SR 56 heads east as Tye Brook Highway, which heads east and crosses the Tye River before intersecting US 29 (Thomas Nelson Highway) at Colleen. The two highways run concurrently northeast past historic Mitchell's Brick House Tavern, contemporary Nelson County High School, and historic Lovingston High School on their way to Lovingston.

SR 56 splits northeast from US 29 along Front Street, which also carries US 29 Business. At the south end of the Lovingston Historic District, SR 56 turns southeast onto James River Road. SR 56 heads southeast through an at-grade crossing of Norfolk Southern's Washington District at Shipman. The state highway passes through a gap between Findlay Mountain and Thomas Mountain to Red Apple Orchard. At Wingina, SR 56 passes the historic home Soldier's Joy and has an at-grade intersection with CSX's Rivanna Subdivision, then crosses the James River into Buckingham County. The state highway passes through Woods Corner before reaching its eastern terminus at US 60 (James Anderson Highway) in Alcoma west of the county seat of Buckingham.

== Major intersections ==
County	Location	mi	km	Destinations	Notes
Augusta	Steeles Tavern	0.00	0.00	US 11 (Lee Highway) / SR 851 (Midway School Road) to I-81 – Lexington, Staunton	Western terminus
Rockbridge	No major junctions				
Nelson	Tye River Gap	5.43	8.74	Blue Ridge Parkway	Interchange
Nelson	Lanes Ford	23.69	38.13	SR 151 north (Patrick Henry Highway) – Wintergreen, Afton	Western end of SR 151 concurrency
Nelson	Shady Lane	26.25	42.25	SR 151 south (Patrick Henry Highway) – Piney River, Lynchburg	Eastern end of SR 151 concurrency
Nelson				SR 655 (Roseland Road) – Roseland	former planned SR 56 west
Nelson	Colleen	31.28	50.34	US 29 south (Thomas Nelson Highway) – Lynchburg	Western end of US 29 concurrency
Nelson		35.56	57.23	US 29 north (Thomas Nelson Highway) – Charlottesville	Eastern end of US 29 concurrency; western end of US 29 Bus. concurrency
Nelson	Lovingston	35.86	57.71	US 29 Bus. north (Front Street) – Charlottesville	Eastern end of US 29 Bus. concurrency
Buckingham				SR 602 (Howardsville Road) – Glenmore, Howardsville	former SR 283 north
Buckingham	Dentons Corner	60.87	97.96	US 60 (West James Anderson Highway)	Eastern terminus
1.000 mi = 1.609 km; 1.000 km = 0.621 mi: Concurrency terminus

< SR 55	Two‑digit State Routes; 1923-1933	SR 57 >
< SR 313	District 3 State Routes; 1928–1933	SR 315 >
