= Virginia State Route 151 =

State highway in central Virginia, US

State Route 151

Route information
- Maintained by VDOT
- Length: 35.22 mi (56.68 km)
- Existed: 1933–present
- Tourist routes: Virginia Byway

Major junctions
- South end: US 29 at Buffalo Hill
- SR 56 at Piney River; SR 6 / SR 638 in Avon
- North end: US 250 at Critzers Shop

Location
- Country: United States
- State: Virginia
- Counties: Amherst, Nelson, Albemarle

Highway system
- Virginia Routes; Interstate; US; Primary; Secondary; Byways; History; HOT lanes
← SR 150	→ SR 152

State Route 151 (SR 151) is a primary state highway in the U.S. state of Virginia. The state highway runs 35.22 miles (56.68 km) from U.S. Route 29 (US 29) at Buffalo Hill north to US 250 at Critzers Shop. SR 151 traverses the Blue Ridge foothills of western Nelson County, where the highway provides access to the Wintergreen Resort.

== Route description ==
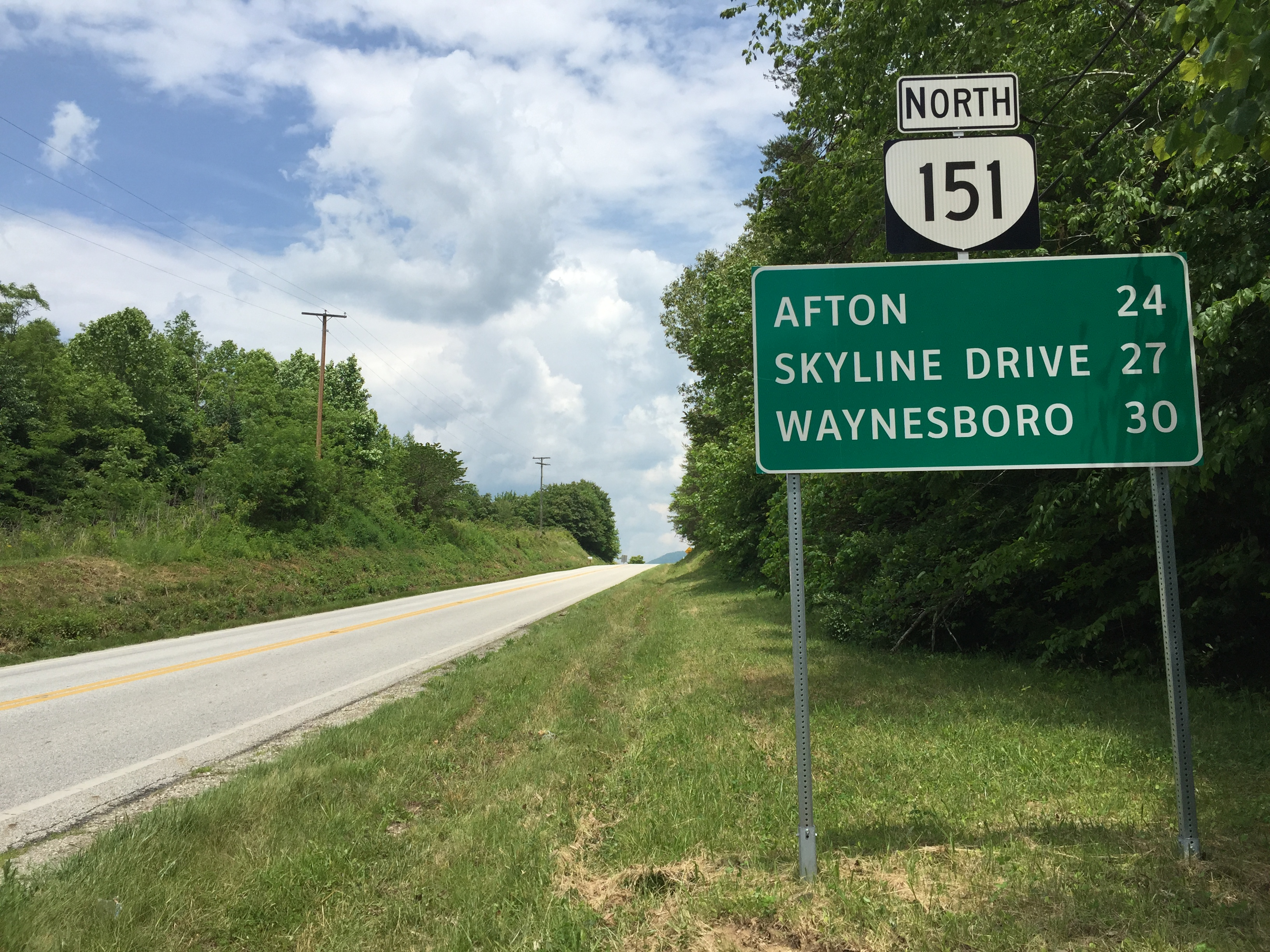
View north along SR 151 north of SR 56 in Nelson County

SR 151 begins at an intersection with US 29 (Amherst Highway) at the hamlet of Buffalo Hill north of Amherst in northern Amherst County. The state highway heads north as two-lane undivided Patrick Henry Highway. SR 151 passes through the village of Clifford, which contains the historic homes Brick House and Winton; the latter property is preserved as part of a country club. The state highway curves around Turkey Mountain and enters Nelson County by crossing the Piney River. SR 151 passes through the hamlet of Piney River and intersects SR 56 (Tye Brook Highway) at a wye intersection; the southeast leg of the wye is unsigned, 0.23-mile (0.37 km) long SR 151Y. SR 151 and SR 56 run concurrently northeast through Hendersons Store to Roseland, where SR 56 (Crabtree Falls Highway) splits northwest to ascend the spine of the Blue Ridge Mountains. Immediately to the north of the intersection, SR 151 crosses the Tye River at Lanes Ford. The state highway passes through Jonesboro and follows Hat Creek to its source at Horseshoe Mountain, which the highway crosses via a winding route at Brent Gap.

SR 151 descends to the village of Wintergreen at the head of the Rockfish Valley. At SR 664 (Beech Grove Road), the primary access highway to the four-season Wintergreen Resort, SR 151's name changes to Rockfish Valley Road, which follows the South Fork of the Rockfish River past the Devil's Backbone Brewing Company brewpub and the historic home River Bluff. North of the village of Nellysford, SR 151 intersects SR 6 (River Road) at Martins Store near the confluence of the Rockfish River's forks. The two highways follow the North Fork of the river to its source at the confluence of several creeks near Avon, where SR 6 splits north as Afton Mountain Road toward Afton. SR 151 continues northeast along Critzers Shop Road, which enters Albemarle County shortly before reaching the route's northern terminus at US 250 (Rockfish Gap Turnpike) at Critzers Shop.

== Major intersections ==
County	Location	mi	km	Destinations	Notes
Amherst		0.00	0.00	US 29 (Amherst Highway) – Charlottesville, Amherst, Lynchburg	Southern terminus
Nelson	Shady Lane			SR 778 (Lowesville Road) – Lowesville	former SR 158 west
Nelson	Shady Lane	8.01	12.89	SR 56 east (Tye Brook Highway) – Lovingston	South end of concurrency with SR 56; former SR 158 east
Nelson	Lanes Ford	10.57	17.01	SR 56 west (Crabtree Falls Highway) – Massies Mill, Crabtree Falls	North end of concurrency with SR 56
Nelson	Lanes Ford			SR 655 east (Roseland Road)	former planned SR 56 east
Nelson				SR 664 (Beech Grove Road / Glenthorne Loop) – Wintergreen Mountain Village, Blue Ridge Parkway	
Nelson	Martins Store	26.48	42.62	SR 6 east (River Road) to US 29 – Scottsville, Lynchburg	South end of concurrency with SR 6
Nelson	Avon	32.70	52.63	SR 6 west (Afton Mountain Road) / SR 638 east (Avon Road) – Afton	North end of concurrency with SR 6
Albemarle		35.22	56.68	US 250 (Rockfish Gap Turnpike) – Waynesboro, Charlottesville, Richmond, Blue Ridge Parkway	Northern terminus
1.000 mi = 1.609 km; 1.000 km = 0.621 mi: Concurrency terminus

< SR 312	District 3 State Routes; 1928–1933	SR 314 >
< SR 314	District 3 State Routes; 1928–1933	SR 316 >
