= List of former primary state highways in Virginia (Lynchburg District) =

The following is a list of former primary state highways completely or mostly within the Lynchburg District (VDOT District 3) of the U.S. state of Virginia.

== SR 126 (1928-1944) ==
State Route 126
- Location: Volens-Gladys
- Existed: 1928–1944

State Route 126 was a westerly alternate to US 501 between Volens and Gladys, following present SR 603 from Volens to SR 40 at Cody and SR 761 (mostly the old Pittsylvania and Lynchburg Turnpike) from the Roanoke River south of Long Island to Gladys. The road from Cody to Long Island was never a primary state highway.

Most of the distance from Volens to Cody became State Route 303 in 1928, with the remaining 1 mile (1.6 km) at the Cody end joining it in 1929. 5.8 miles (9.3 km) of the northern segment were added in 1932 as State Route 323. Both routes became SR 126 in the 1933 renumbering, and in October 1933 the northern segment was extended south to the Roanoke River. The southern segment from Volens to Cody and most of the northern segment from the Roanoke River to SR 699 were downgraded to secondary in 1943, the former becoming an extension of existing SR 603, and the remaining 1.8 miles (2.9 km) from SR 699 to Volens followed in 1944.

== SR 126 (1930-1979) ==
State Route 126
- Location: Forest-Lynchburg
- Existed: 1930–1979

State Route 126 extended west from US 460 (now US 460 Business) in southwestern Lynchburg along Graves Mill Road (SR 1425 outside Lynchburg) to US 221 at Clay (east of Forest). It was mostly added to the state highway system in 1930 as part of State Route 319, with the westernmost 1 mile (1.6 km) completing the route in 1932. SR 319 became SR 128 in the 1933 renumbering, but that route was split in 1948, with the central piece along Fort Avenue renumbered SR 297 and the western piece becoming new SR 126. An easterly extension along the new Lynchburg Expressway to US 29 (now US 29 Business) was added in August 1964, but two months later it instead became SR 297, with SR 126 replacing SR 297 from their intersection northeast on Fort Avenue to U.S. Route 29 Alternate (now US 29 Business), which had been part of SR 128 until 1948. This extension was renumbered again in 1976, becoming part of U.S. Route 460 Business, which it remains to this day. The portion of SR 126 within Lynchburg city limits became an ordinary city street in 1977, and the short stub in Bedford County was downgraded to secondary in 1979.

== SR 127 ==
State Route 127
- Location: Evington-Forest
- Existed: 1928–1948

State Route 127 extended south from US 460 (now US 221) at Forest to SR 24 at Evington along current secondary SR 811. The road was added to the state highway system as part of SR 43 in 1928. SR 43 was split among SR 24 and SR 127 in the 1933 renumbering, and the latter was downgraded to secondary in 1948.

Major intersections

County	Location	mi	km	Destinations	Notes
Campbell	Evington	0.00	0.00	SR 24 (Colonial Highway) – Bedford, Evington	
Bedford				SR 297 (East Lynchburg Salem Turnpike)	now US 460
Bedford	Forest	11.45	18.43	US 460 (Forest Road)	now US 221
1.000 mi = 1.609 km; 1.000 km = 0.621 mi

== SR 132 ==
State Route 132
- Location: US 460-Evergreen
- Existed: 1932–1943

State Route 132 ran southwest from US 460 southeast of Appomattox to Evergreen along part of current SR 630. It was added to the state highway system in 1932 as State Route 326, became SR 132 in the 1933 renumbering, and was downgraded to secondary in 1943, initially becoming an extension of existing SR 681.

== SR 135 ==
State Route 135
- Location: Green Bay-Farmville
- Existed: 1930–1945

State Route 135 extended from US 360 at Green Bay north to US 460 southeast of Farmville along current SR 696. 5.5 miles (8.9 km) from the Green Bay end was added to the state highway system in 1930 as State Route 318, which was extended north 1/2 mile (0.80 km) in 1931 and the remaining 6 miles (9.7 km) in 1932. It was renumbered SR 135 in the 1933 renumbering and downgraded to secondary in 1945. (SR 135Y, a 1 mile (1.6 km) connection northeast to US 360 along original SR 20, which US 360 replaced, swapped with SR 135 by 1940, and its original route was downgraded to SR 694 in 1943.)

Major intersections

The entire route is in Prince Edward County.

Location	mi	km	Destinations	Notes
Green Bay	0.00	0.00	US 360 (Patrick Henry Highway)	
	11.30	18.19	US 460 (Prince Edward Highway)	
1.000 mi = 1.609 km; 1.000 km = 0.621 mi

== SR 152 ==
State Route 152
- Location: South Boston
- Existed: 1931–1942

State Route 152 was a spur from Wilborn Avenue (now US 501 southbound) in South Boston to the former South Boston Airport, following Edmunds Street and Lomax Avenue. The route was added to the state highway system in 1931 as State Route 322 (the portion within South Boston limits was defined in 1932), which became SR 152 in the 1933 renumbering and was downgraded to secondary SR 852 in 1942.

== SR 158 ==
State Route 158
- Location: Sardis-Shady Lane-Colleen
- Existed: 1927–1970

State Route 158 extended north and east along present SR 778 from US 60 between Sandidges and Sardis via Lowesville to Shady Lane, and then continued east to US 29 at Colleen along present SR 56.

The first 1.75 miles (2.82 km) of road west from Shady Lane was added to the state highway system in 1927 as State Route 182 (a spur of SR 18, which followed present SR 151 through Shady Lane). It became State Route 313 in the 1928 renumbering, and a 1 mile (1.6 km) extension to the county line at Lowesville was added later that year, along with a second section northeast from current US 60. The 1.1 miles (1.8 km) gap at Lowesville was filled in 1930, making a continuous route from near Sardis to Shady Lane. In 1931 or 1932, SR 313 was extended northeast from Shady Lane to SR 18 (now SR 6) near Nellysford, replacing a former alignment of SR 18 through Lanes Ford and the entirety of SR 315; a 7.7 miles (12.4 km) gap in this addition was filled in 1932. The entire length of SR 313 became SR 151 in the 1933 renumbering, but in 1947 it was split at Shady Lane due to the realignment of US 29 (which had replaced that part of SR 18). SR 151 was rerouted south from Shady Lane on what had been US 29 towards Amherst, while the portion west and south from Shady Lane was combined with old US 29 east to Colleen to become a new SR 158.

The part of SR 158 west of Shady Lane was downgraded to secondary in 1954. The remainder kept its number until 1970, when it became part of SR 56 in place of a proposed more direct alignment on SR 655 through Roseland, which had not been a primary highway since SR 14 was removed from it in about 1930.

== SR 283 ==
State Route 283
- Location: Dentons Corner-north
- Existed: 1930–1943

State Route 283 extended north from SR 56 north of Dentons Corner along present SR 602 in the direction of Howardsville, ending about 1 mile (1.6 km) south of Glenmore.

The first portion of SR 283 became a state highway in 1930 when SR 306 was extended northwest from Buckingham, overlapping SR 13 to Dentons Corner and then continuing north for 2.5 miles (4.0 km). A further extension of 1.1 miles (1.8 km) in 1932 took it to the present junction of SR 601 near Mount Vinco.

In the 1933 renumbering, this extension of SR 306 became SR 283, the highest state route number assigned at the time, with the exception of the southernmost 1 mile (1.6 km), which was instead part of SR 56. It was extended a further 3 miles (4.8 km) in 1937 and 1.2 miles (1.9 km) in 1938, but only four years later the northern 3.1 miles (5.0 km) were downgraded to secondary as an extension of existing SR 602. The job was finished the next year, in 1943.

Major intersections

The entire route is in Buckingham County.

Location	mi	km	Destinations	Notes
	0.00	0.00	SR 56 (South James River Road)	
	6.72	10.81	SR 602 (Howardsville Road) – Glenmore, Howardsville	
1.000 mi = 1.609 km; 1.000 km = 0.621 mi

== SR 297 ==
State Route 297
- Location: west of Lynchburg
- Existed: 1935–1942

State Route 297 was the designation for Linkhorne Drive in what is now part of the city of Lynchburg, running east from Old Forest Road (then SR 291) at Forest Hill to a dead end and a proposed connection to Langhorne Road (US 501) barely inside Lynchburg. It was added to the state highway system in 1935 and downgraded to secondary in 1942.
