= Glenmore, Virginia =

Glenmore, Virginia may refer to:

- Glenmore, Albemarle County, Virginia
- Glenmore, Buckingham County, Virginia
