= Westcote =

Westcote may refer to:

- Westcote (Cranston, Rhode Island), a historic house in the United States
- Westcote, Gloucestershire, a civil parish in England

== See also ==
- West Cote, a historic house in Virginia, United States
- Westcotes, the West End of Leicester, Leicestershire, England
