= Monticola (Howardsville, Virginia) =

Historic house in Virginia, United States

- U.S. National Register of Historic Places
- Virginia Landmarks Register
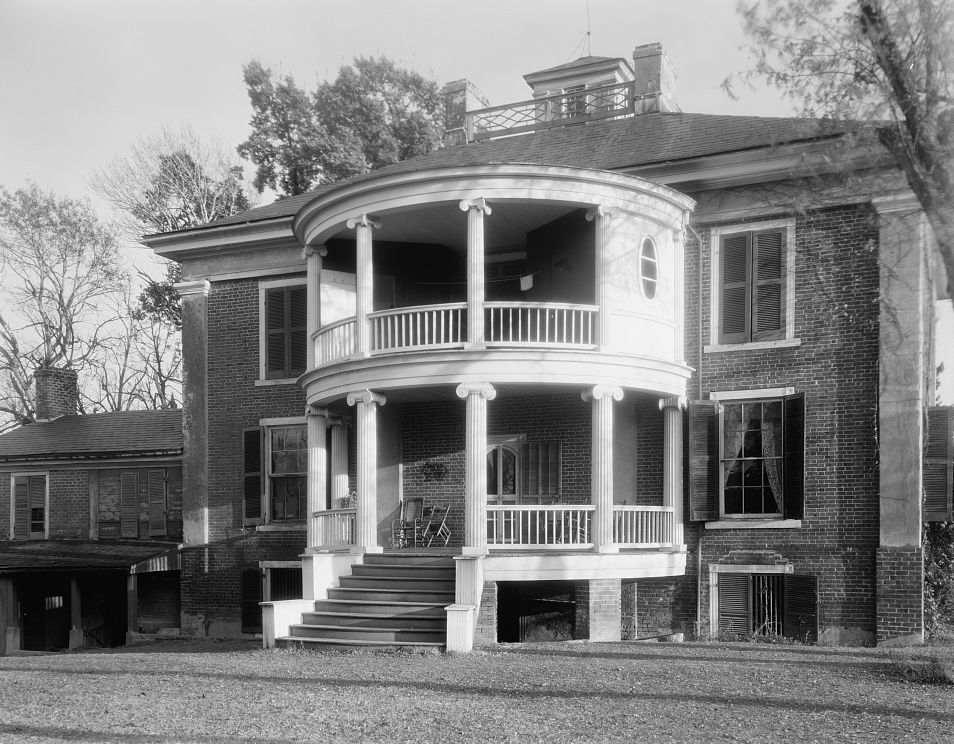
- Monticola, Carnegie Survey of the Architecture of the South, 1935

- Location within Virginia Location within the United States
- Location: VA 602 north of the junction with VA 724, near Howardsville, Virginia
- Coordinates: 37°44′31″N 78°38′51″W
- Area: 40 acres (16 ha)
- Built: 1853
- Architectural style: Colonial Revival, Greek Revival
- NRHP reference No.: 90000872
- VLR No.: 002-0051

Significant dates
- Added to NRHP: June 22, 1990
- Designated VLR: April 18, 1989

Monticola is a historic plantation home and farm located along the James River near Howardsville, Albemarle County, Virginia. The house was built in 1853 for planter, merchant and banker Daniel James Hartsook, and is a three-story, three-bay, brick Greek Revival style dwelling. The front facade features a central, two-story, pedimented portico. The rear facade has a semi-circular, two-level, porch with Colonial Revival details. It was added about 1890 by Prussian born Richmond tobacco exporter, Emil Otto Nolting, who had purchased the estate three years earlier in 1887.

The four corners of the house are adorned by giant stuccoed pilasters. The original two-story, brick kitchen building is attached to the house by an enclosed breezeway. Also on the property are a smokehouse, storage shed, corn crib, and the foundation of a late-19th century spring house.

During the Civil War Monticola was briefly commandeered by Union Army General Phillip Sheridan who used it as his headquarters while his forces raided Howardsville and the surrounding area.

It was added to the National Register of Historic Places in 1990.
