= Jonesboro, Virginia =

Unincorporated community in Virginia, United States

Coordinates: 37°47′01″N 78°58′42″W

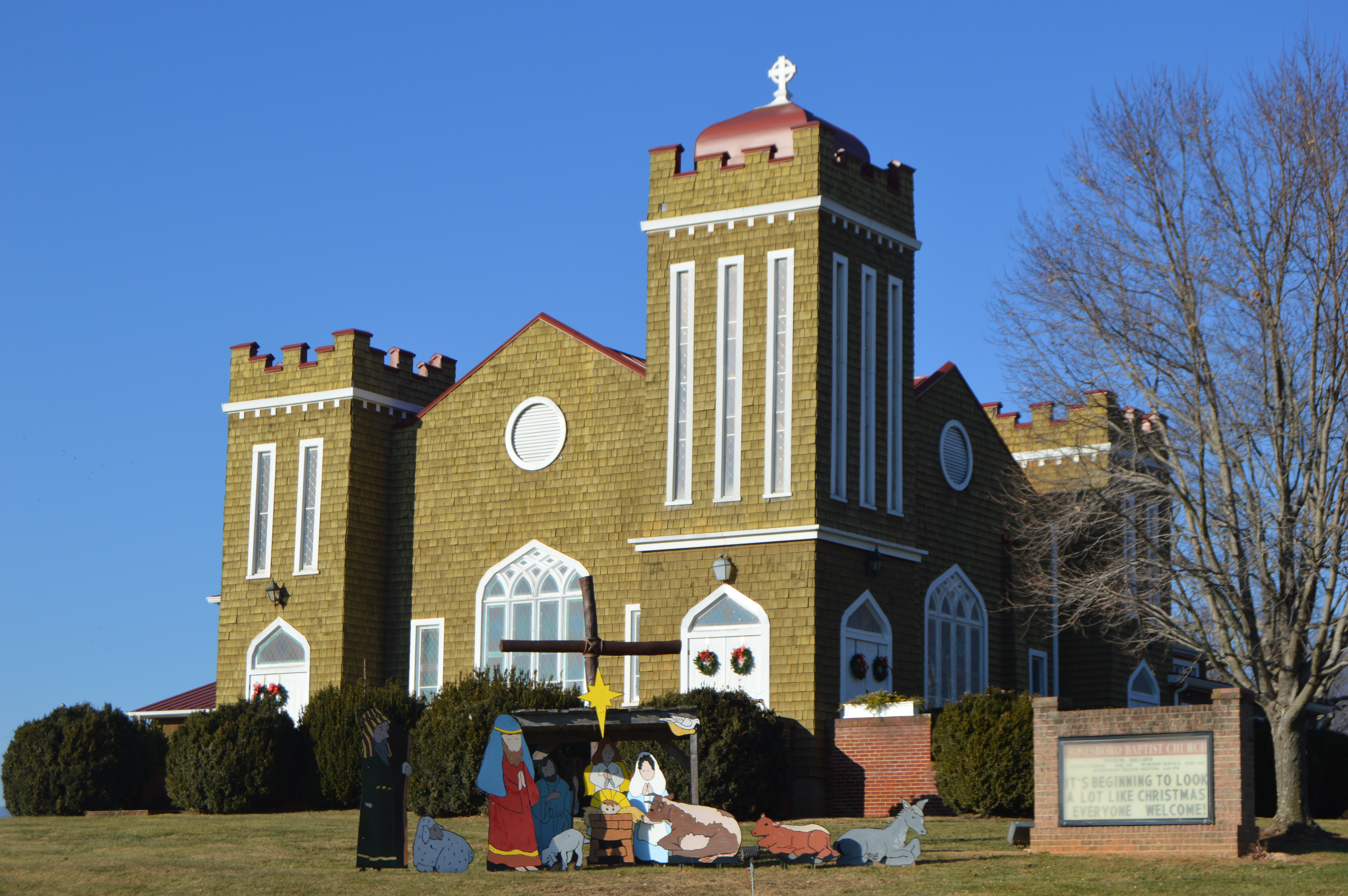
Baptist church on State Route 151

Jonesboro is an unincorporated community in Nelson County, Virginia, United States.
