= West Cote =

Historic house in Virginia, United States

- U.S. National Register of Historic Places
- Virginia Landmarks Register
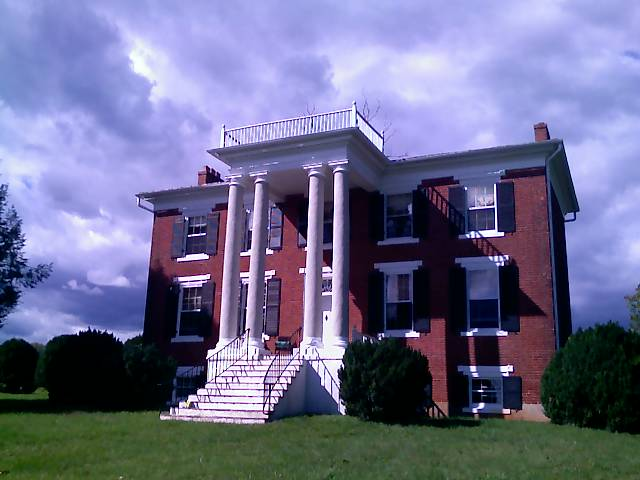
- West Cote in Howardsville, Va.

- Location within Virginia Location within the United States
- Location: Off VA 602 and VA 626, near Howardsville, Virginia
- Coordinates: 37°44′2″N 78°39′7″W
- Area: 37 acres (15 ha)
- Built: c. 1830
- Architectural style: Colonial Revival
- NRHP reference No.: 01001510
- VLR No.: 002-0098

Significant dates
- Added to NRHP: January 24, 2002
- Designated VLR: May 13, 2001

West Cote is a historic home located near Howardsville, Albemarle County, Virginia. The house was built about 1830, and is a two-story, five-bay, brick dwelling. The front facade features a two-story, Tuscan order portico with paired full-height columns and no pediment.. Also on the property are a contributing office / guest house, smokehouse, well, corn crib, and stable.

Set dramatically on a sweeping hillside overlooking the confluence of the James and Rockfish rivers, West Cote, in Albemarle County, Virginia features a two-story, brick, classical revival plantation dwelling built ca. 1830. A well-preserved example of a high-style house of the Early Republican era, it is associated in its design and execution with a group of houses in central Virginia that were constructed by builders who were either involved in or influenced by the construction of the University of Virginia to Thomas Jefferson's designs. Surviving outbuildings include a guesthouse, smokehouse, corncrib and a stable. The unusually wide and deep ante-bellum well is also noteworthy.

== History ==
What is now West Cote was once a part of large tracts of land assembled in the 1730s and 1740s by Allen Howard. Howard was one of a group of large landholders who were the contemporaries of Peter Jefferson, father of Thomas Jefferson. These men led and promoted the settlement of what eventually became Albemarle and its adjacent counties. Howard and his descendants lived near the confluence of the James and Rockfish rivers. The present house at West Cote was built about 1830 by one of those descendants, William Howard Carter (probably a grandson or great-grandson of Allen Howard).

Carter inherited the property in 1826. In 1837 he petitioned to erect a ferry across the James River near West Cote. The architectural and construction details indicate that he built West Cote between these dates. It was an era of house building and a number of large brick mansions rose both on the hills and in the valleys of Albemarle. This came at a time when the building of the University of Virginia was just being completed. This large state project brought to the area a group of skilled workmen, some of whom trained others. Many of both groups remained in the general area and became builders of houses, churches, and courthouses and made changes to older buildings. It is likely that someone who worked on the University buildings or was trained by University workmen built West Cote. Its fine brickwork, impressive portico (Jeffersonian in detail, but not in massing), and geometric front-door transom all are reminiscent of the retired president's idiosyncratic style.

By 1840 William Howard Carter was in financial straits. In that year he sold West Cote to Jonathan Crank, a neighbor. Two years later Crank sold the property to William D. Boaz who owned it for 12 years. Boaz sold West Cote in 1856 beginning a succession of six sales until 1893 when Andrew Blair, a "prizefighter" from Richmond, bought it. The Blair family used West Cote mainly as a retreat and called it "Summer Hill". They owned it until 1948, the longest family ownership in the history of the property. The next owners were the Covingtons. Susan Byrd, purchased the house in 1997 and sold it in 2008 to the present owners.

It was added to the National Register of Historic Places in 2002.

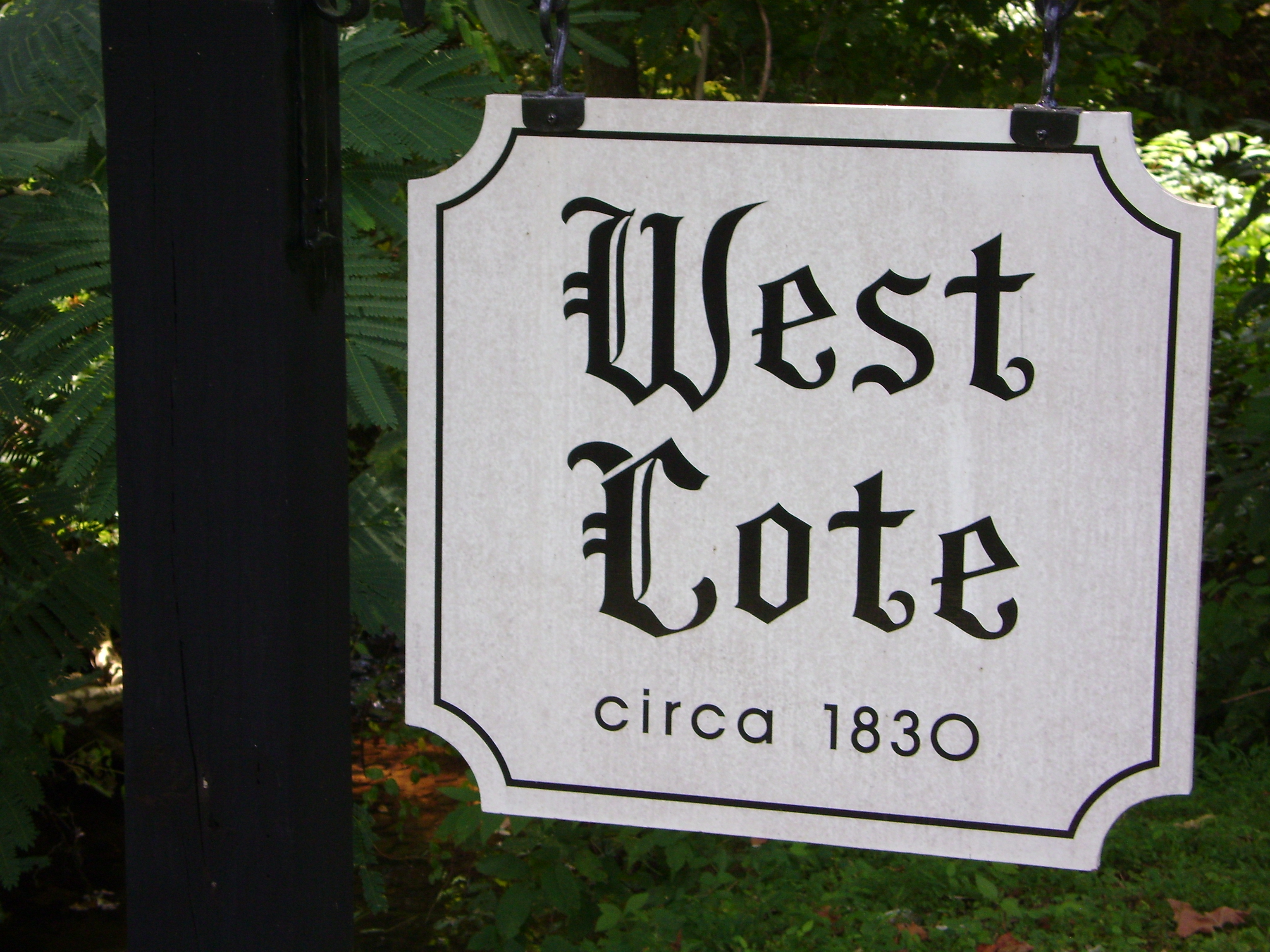
West Cote Sign

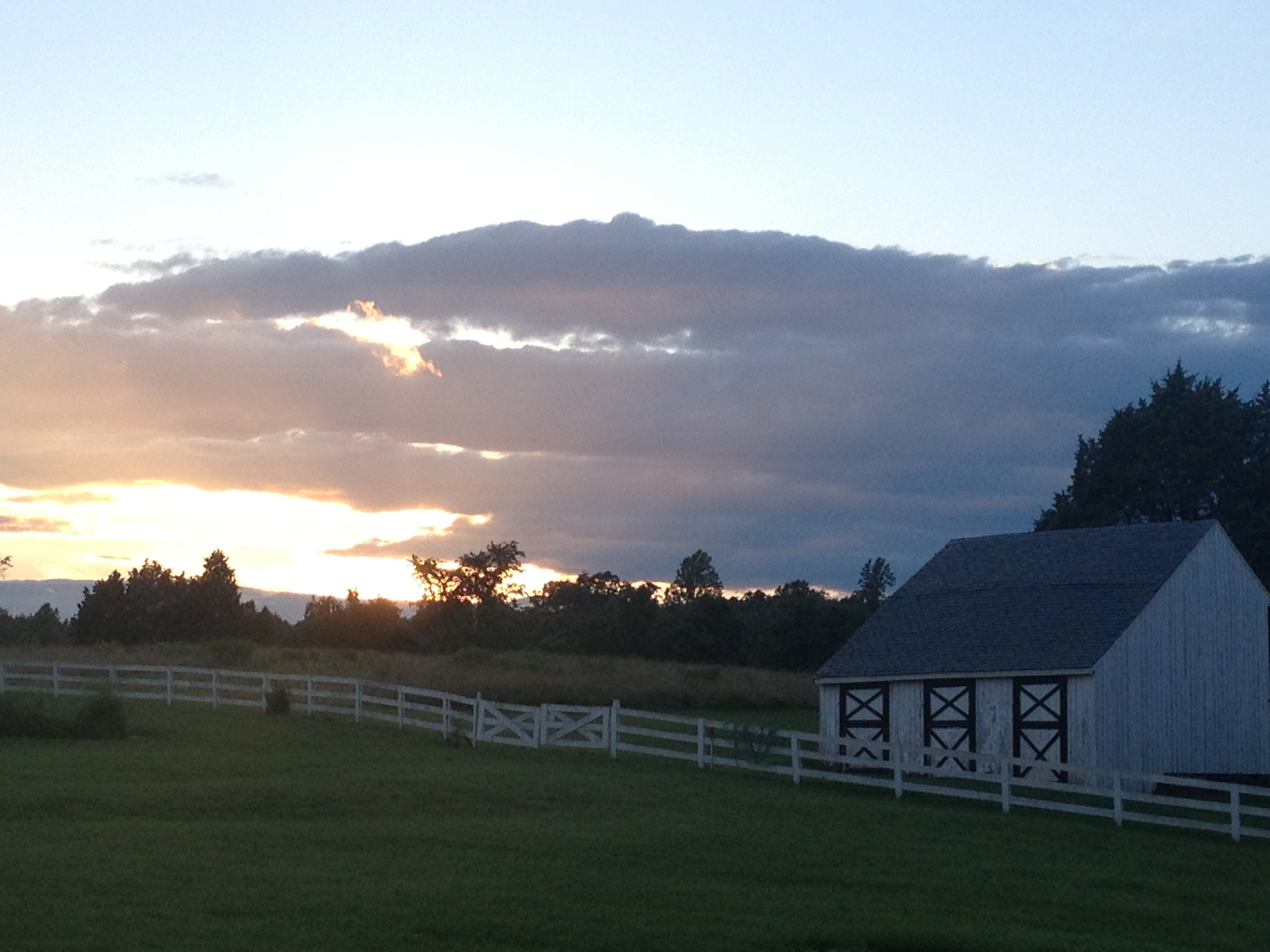
West Cote

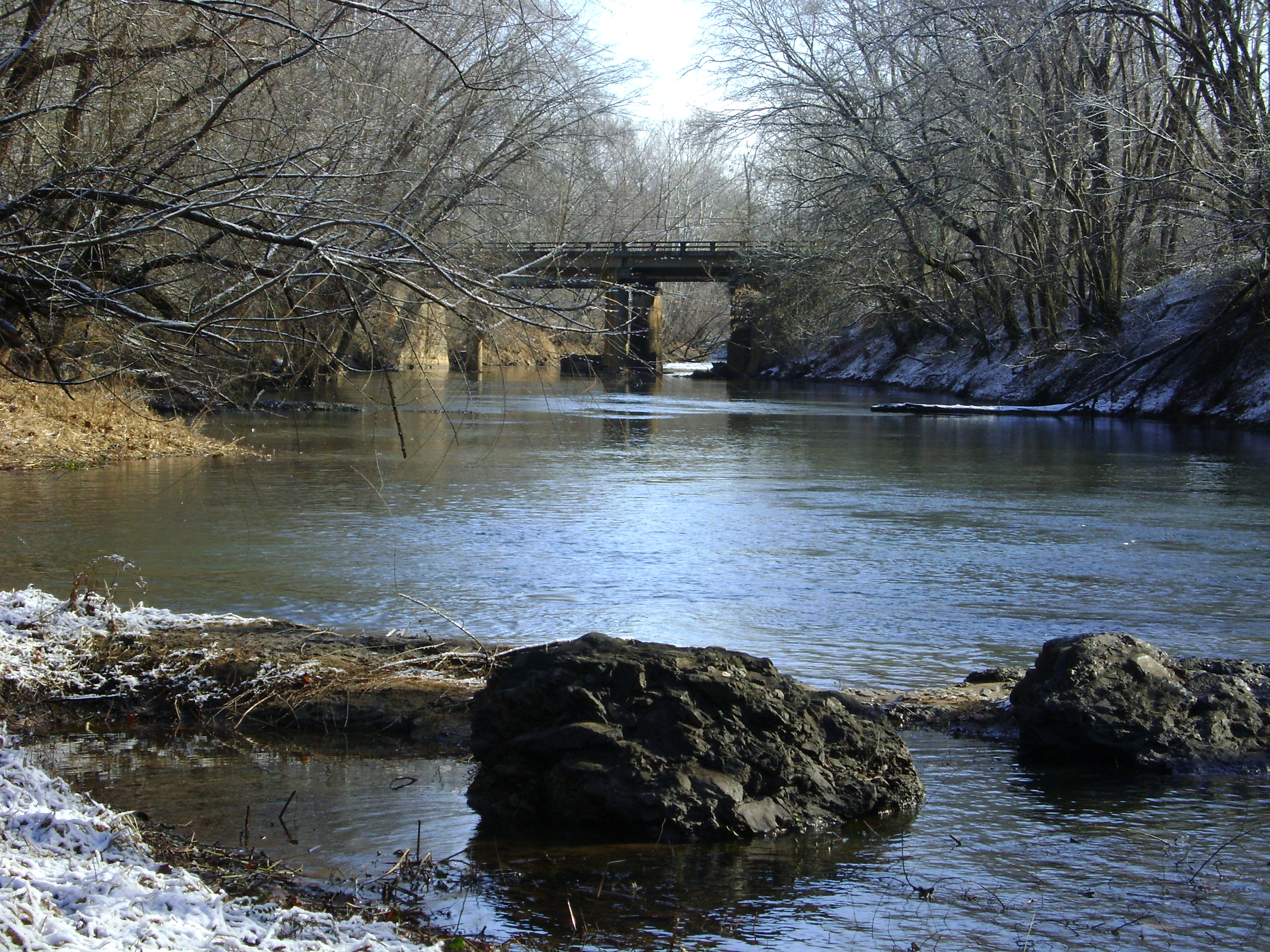
Rockfish River, Virginia

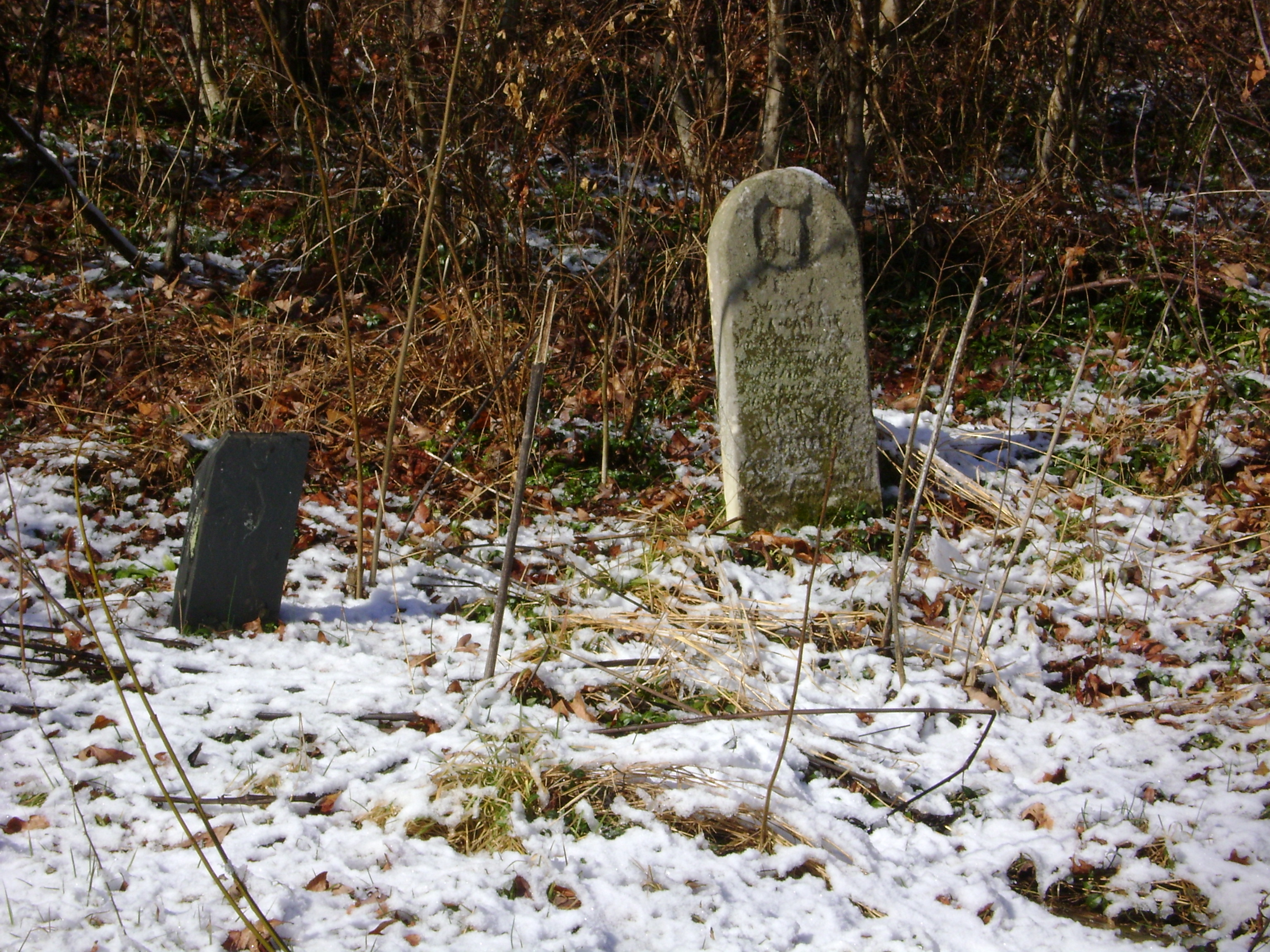
West Cote Cemetery

== Description ==
=== House ===
WestCote's massive brick dwelling rises two stories above a raised basement. The front is of oiled brick in Flemish bond with penciled joints. The north wall is of stock brick in Flemish bond while the other two walls are of five-course American bond. The main facade is five bays wide and features a two-story Tuscan portico with paired full-height columns and no pediment. The portico gives access to the front door, a double door under a large rectangular transom. The transom features tracery in the form of a fan with radiating ribs connected by two rows of swags and a three-petal flower in each of the upper corner quadrants. Over the transom is a lintel with corner blocks that extend beyond the door frame. This combination of elements is typical of buildings that bridge the Roman Revival and Greek Revival styles. The four basement windows have single sashes of nine panes each. The first-floor windows have nine-over-nine sash and the second-floor windows have six-over-six. The house has a low hipped roof covered with standing-seam sheet metal. The portico is crowned by a modern metal railing. The end elevations are unadorned except for the massive cornice and frieze that surrounds the house at the eaves. The cornice is decorated with a beaded molding inspired by an illustration in Asher Benjamin's American Builders Companion, 1805. The rear elevation has the same center door and fenestration as the front. There is a small two-story twentieth-century frame addition in the center of the rear wall.

Westcote is an I-house with a center passage plan on each floor. The basement is fully finished and houses a dining room and kitchen. The former has simple trim and the latter has modem but complementary finishes.

The upper floors exhibit unusual woodwork combining elements from several different styles. The first-floor doors have eight panels rather than the usual six. These are set in two vertical ranges with three equal horizontal panes over a single tall vertical panel at the base. The door cases are composed of symmetrically molded architraves with roundel comer block. The panels of the reveals correspond to those of the doors. The central passage has single-leaf doors of this design to each of its flanking rooms. The front and rear doors look identical, but are in fact double doors. There is a plastered dado between the simple chair rail and baseboard.

The stair rises in one long flight to a transverse landing and returns in a short flight to the upper floor. The rail, however, curves into the transverse section, rather than continuing perpendicular to the runs of the stair. The delicate foliated stair brackets are thereby forced to constrict and form a frieze-like pattern on the curved section. The brackets are similar to ones illustrated in Owen Biddle "The Young Carpenter's Assistant" (1810). The molded handrail is supported by plain balusters that are square in section. The newel post is delicately fashioned and includes a block surmounted by a round urn-shaped section from which a round tapering column rises to a simple band below a cylinder cap. It is a handsome example of joinery and is related to ones at several other local houses including Mount Fair.

The room to the left' of the front door is the parlor. The wooden wainscot is not paneled. The window cases rest on the chair rail and are treated in the same way as the door cases including blocks at the point where the frames meet the chair rail. The reveals are paneled with narrow vertical panels. The most interesting feature of the room is the robust mantel, a local variation of the three-part Adam type. Here coupled fluted colonnettes flank the fireplace opening. In the frieze above, a center panel with an ovoid sunburst is flanked by round sunbursts in square panels. These, in turn, are flanked by pairs of applied turned spools in end blocks which are placed over the colonnettes. There is a thin molded shelf above a band of dentils. Like the stair details, this mantel is related to ones in other nearby houses. It is likely that some of these are the work of a yet unidentified area craftsman. Across the hall is the library similar in detail to the parlor. The mantel is simpler and is flanked by massive eight-panel doors that serve cupboards.

On the second floor, as would be expected, the finishes are simpler than those on the first floor. The east room mantel has fluted pilasters and a tall paneled frieze. The center panel features a motif with a diamond-shaped center with quadrant-cut corners. The mantel in the west room is similar, but more conventional, with three identical plain rectangular frieze panels.

=== Office ===
Standing in the southwest corner of the front yard is a one-story, two-bay frame structure that may be somewhat earlier than the main dwelling. It is about a 16 feet square, has a gable roof and contains one room and a finished loft. The interior was heavily altered in the 20th century.

The off-center five-course American-bond end chimney is probably a late 19th-century replacement. The building is typical of ones that were common in plantation complexes throughout the state.

The Smokehouse stands on the east side of the main house. It is a one-bay, gable- roofed frame building of weatherboards with a slate roof. It is built entirely of circular-sawn members and probably dates from the late 19th century.

Between the smokehouse and the dwelling is a massive circular brick-lined well. 'The well is about eight feet in diameter. The water surface is about 75 feet from the top and the total depth is just under 100 feet. It is one of the largest known hand-dug wells in Virginia. It is assumed to have been dug by slaves soon after the house was constructed.

Standing about 75 yards northwest of the main house, the corncrib was built with ground-to-plate post construction, a form of construction that was common in early Virginia, but certainly not at the end of the 19th century when it is assumed this structure was built. To further complicate the analysis of the crib, timbers from a much earlier building were reused in its construction. There are members marked with Roman numerals that obviously have no relationship to each other either numerically or structurally. It is a rectangular structure 9 by 15 feet, with the gable end to the front. The roof is covered with standing-seam metal. The walls are sheathed with vertical wood slats one to two inches wide secured with cut nails. These were used to facilitate ventilation to keep the corn from mildewing. In the 20th century fine wire mesh was nailed around the exterior to keep out animals. The unusual construction of the front gable in what resembles the Stick Style, with projecting plate and return cornice, suggests that it may have been built around 1900 when the property was owned by the Blair family. Except for this detailing, the building is unornamented. The front door is of plain batten construction and swings on large iron strap hinges. A wrought-iron hasp secures the door to the jamb. Wire nails used on the door and other areas indicate that the building underwent repairs in the 20th century.

=== Stable ===
The building appears to be an early 20th-century building with an asymmetrical gable roof. It is covered with vertical board sheathing and a slate roof. Local workers familiar with West Cote recalled several years ago that the present barn and another one lost about 50 years ago were moved from the flats on the Rockfish River below the house.
