= Nelson County Courthouse =

Historic courthouse in Virginia, US

- U.S. National Register of Historic Places
- U.S. Historic district – Contributing property
- Virginia Landmarks Register
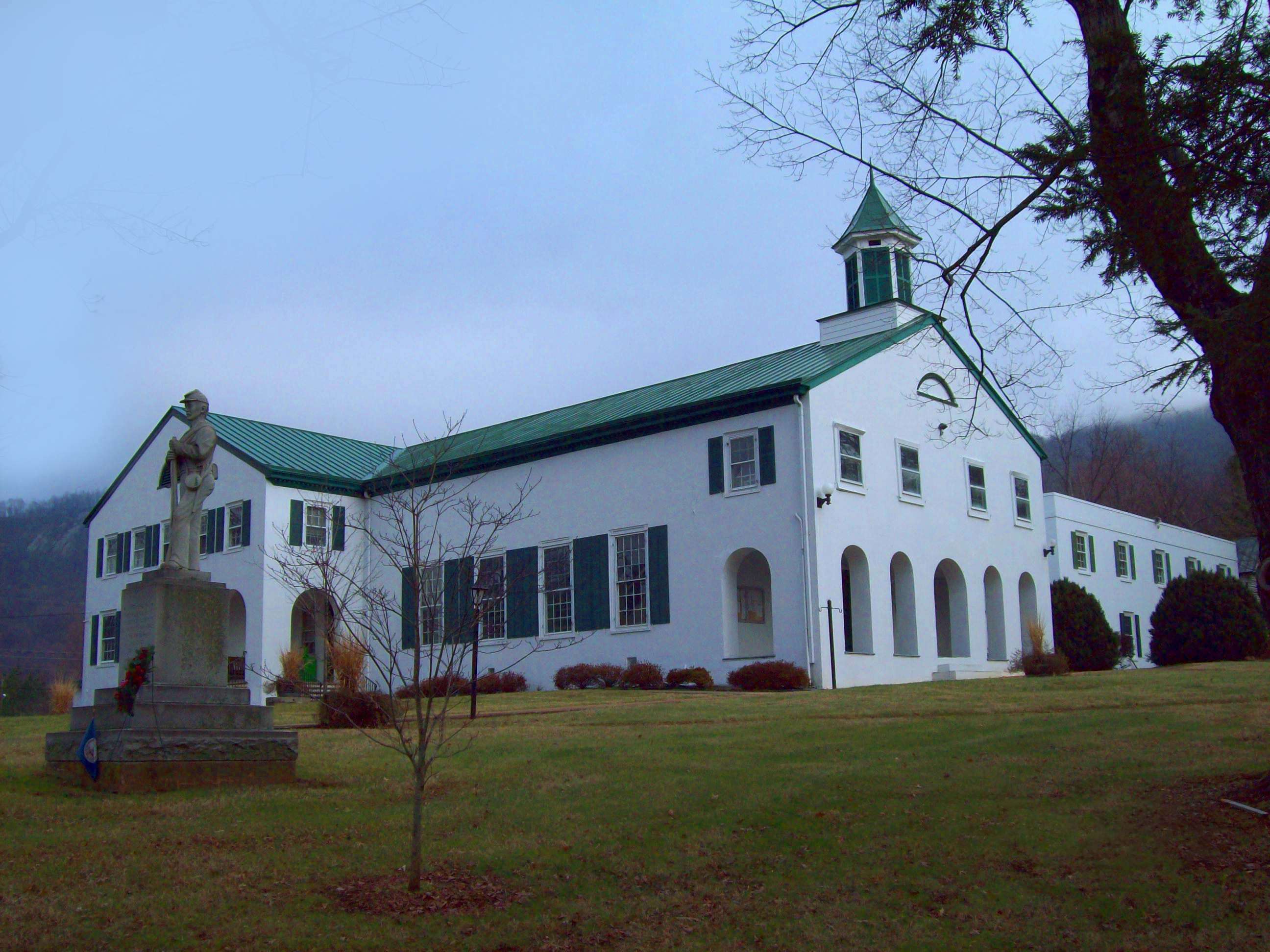
- Nelson County Courthouse, December 2008

- Location within Virginia Location within the United States
- Interactive map showing the location of Nelson County Courthouse
- Location: Off U.S. 29, Lovingston, Virginia
- Coordinates: 37°45′35.5″N 78°52′09″W
- Built: 1810
- Architect: Varnum, George; Crostwait, Shelton
- Architectural style: Colonial
- NRHP reference No.: 73002041
- VLR No.: 062-0009

Significant dates
- Added to NRHP: May 17, 1973
- Designated VLR: April 17, 1973

Nelson County Courthouse is a historic courthouse located at Lovingston, Nelson County, Virginia within the Lovingston Historic District. The original building opened in 1810. It is a rectangular, two-story stuccoed brick structure, with two additions: one of ten feet attached to the rear of the original structure and the other is a large lateral wing across the rear of the first addition. Both of these additions were constructed in 1940. The original structure was partially remodeled in 1968. It contains one large courtroom with a spectator gallery towards the rear. It was the first public building to be built after Nelson County's organization in 1807.

It was listed on the National Register of Historic Places in 1973.

== Gallery ==
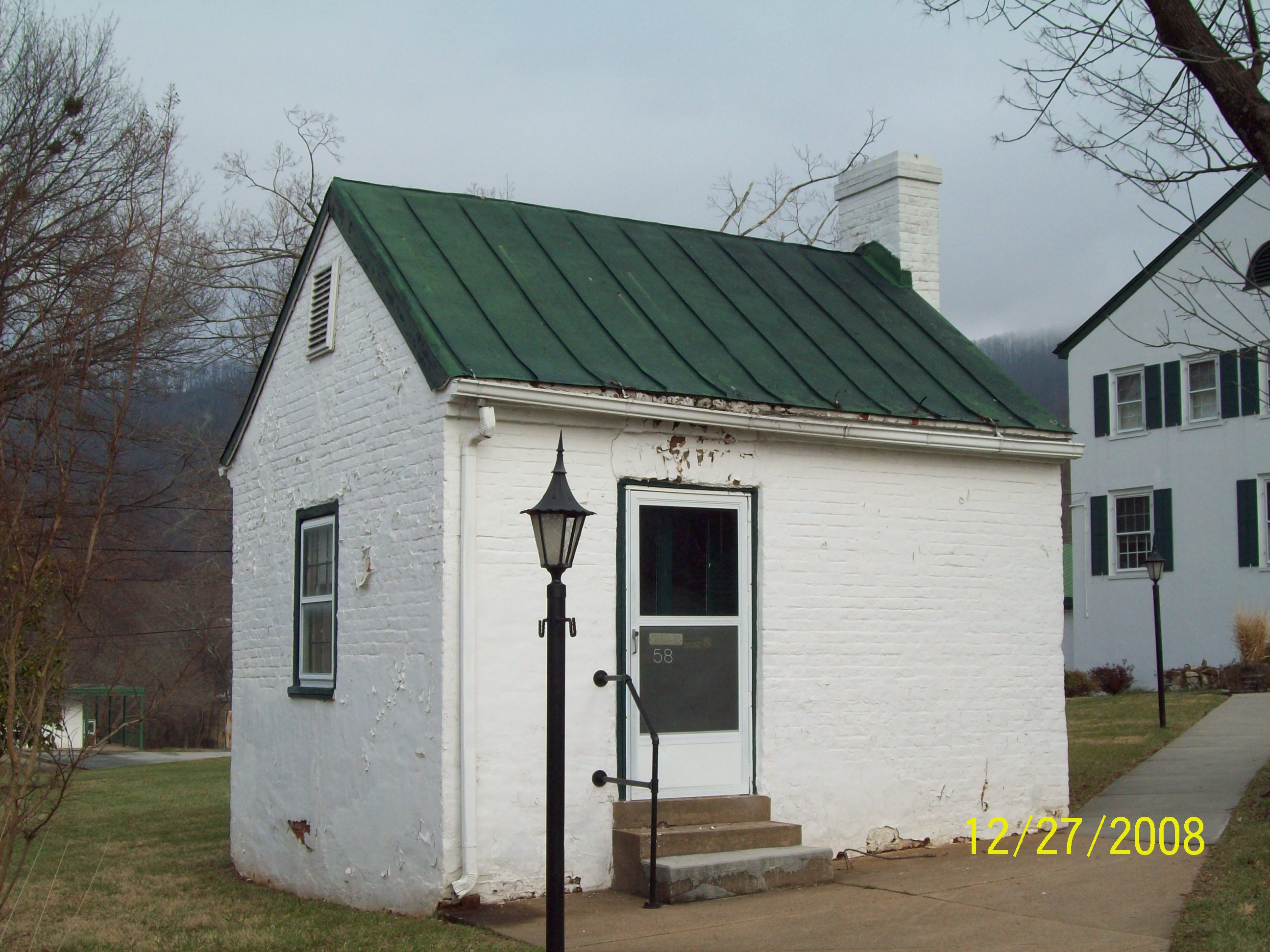
Nelson County Magistrates Building, December 2008
