= Lovingston High School =

Former high school in Virginia, United States

- U.S. National Register of Historic Places
- Virginia Landmarks Register
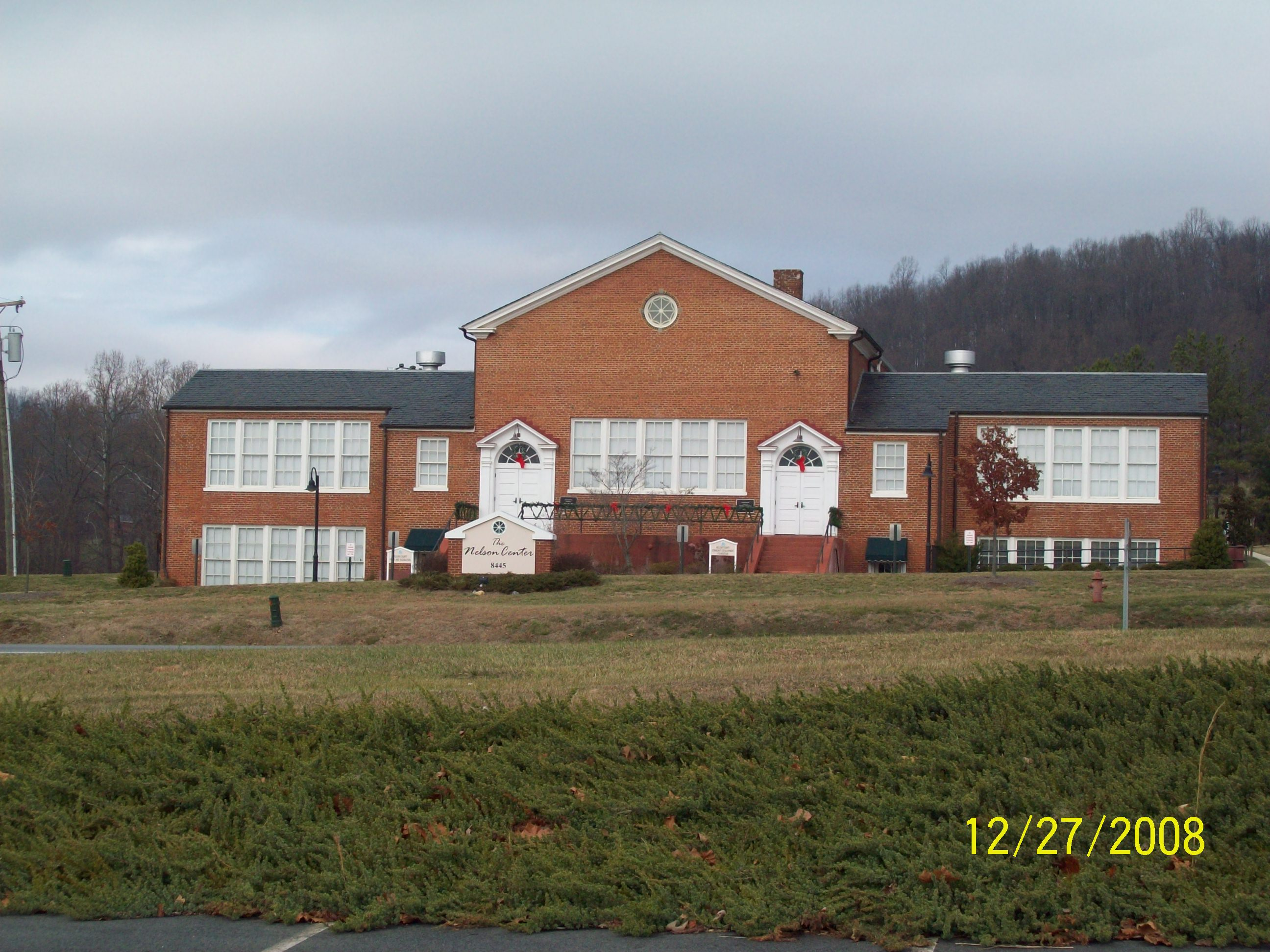
- Lovingston High School, December 2008

- Location within Virginia Location within the United States
- Location: 8445 Thomas Nelson Hwy., Lovingston, Virginia
- Coordinates: 37°45′01″N 78°52′47″W
- Built: 1931
- Architect: Hinnant, C.H.; Monroe and Patterson
- Architectural style: Colonial Revival
- NRHP reference No.: 03000567
- VLR No.: 062-5003

Significant dates
- Added to NRHP: June 23, 2003
- Designated VLR: March 13, 2002

Lovingston High School is a historic school located in Lovingston, Nelson County, Virginia. It is a one-story Colonial Revival-style building that opened in 1931 and originally served grades one through eleven. It consists of a one-and-one-half-story main block with one-story wings. Behind the main block is the central auditorium with a stage and seven flanking classrooms. Later additions to the rear include four additional classrooms, built about 1945, and a kitchen, built in 1951.

It was listed on the National Register of Historic Places in 2003.
