= Mount Vinco, Virginia =

Unincorporated community in Virginia, United States

Coordinates: 37°35′33″N 78°36′05″W

Mount Vinco is an unincorporated community in Buckingham County, in the U.S. state of Virginia.
