= Lovingston Historic District =

Historic district in Virginia, United States

- U.S. National Register of Historic Places
- U.S. Historic district
- Virginia Landmarks Register
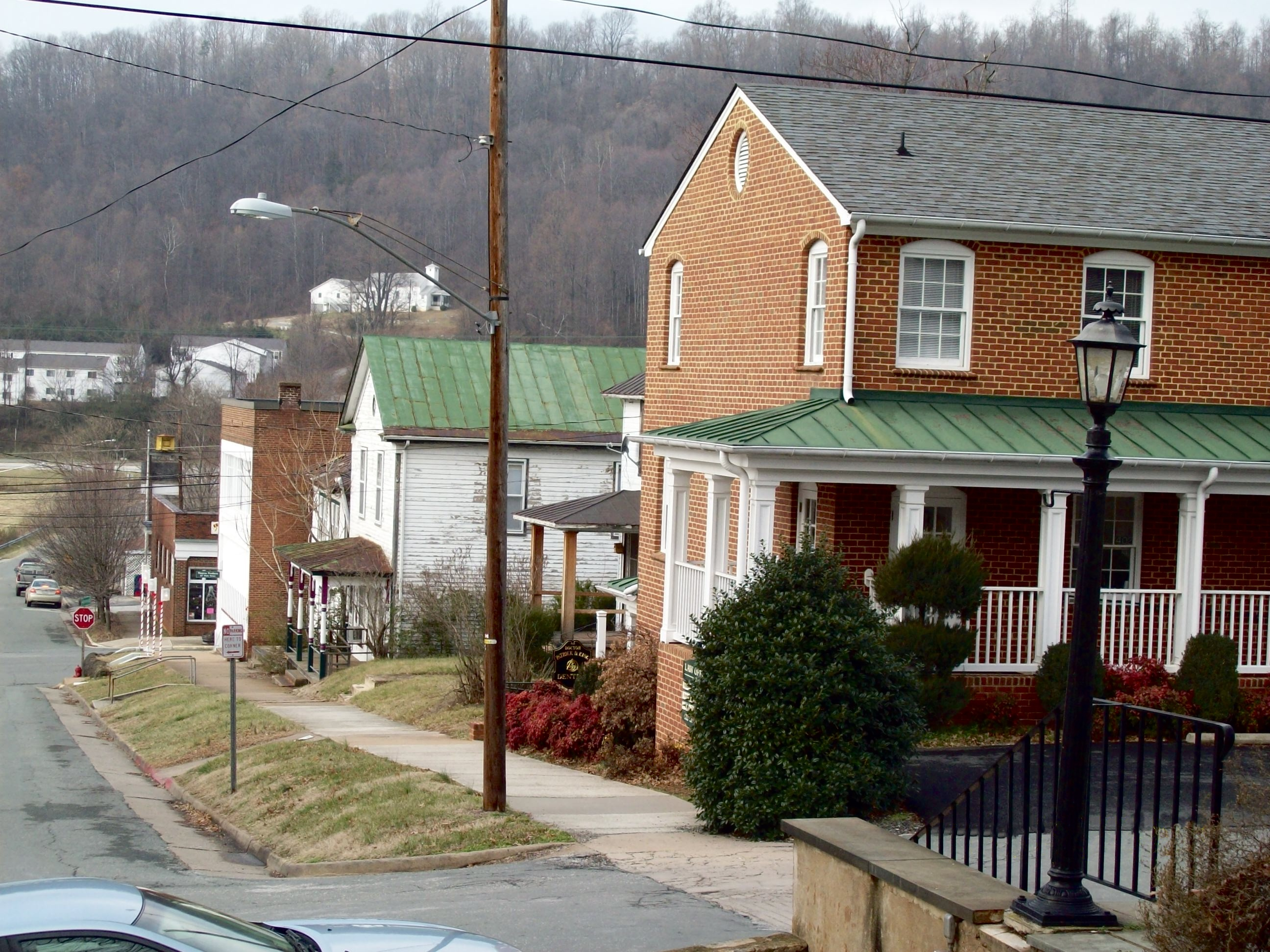
- View of Lovingston from Courthouse, December 2008

- Location within Virginia Location within the United States
- Interactive map showing the location of Lovingston Historic District
- Location: VA 56 (Front St.) from Orchard Rd. (N) to Sunset Ln. (S), Parallel to US 29, Lovingston, Virginia
- Coordinates: 37°45′38″N 78°52′9″W
- Built: 1809
- Architect: Crosthwait, Shelton; et al.
- Architectural style: Federal, Greek Revival
- NRHP reference No.: 05001232
- VLR No.: 062-5108

Significant dates
- Added to NRHP: November 09, 2005
- Designated VLR: September 14, 2005

The Lovingston Historic District is a national historic district located in Lovingston, Virginia, USA. It is a 224.8-acre (0.910 km^{2}) historic district which includes the entirety of the 1809 and 1823 plats as well as the continued growth through the early-to-mid-20th-century. The cohesive village contains a diverse collection of building types and architectural styles that reflect the town's growth and development as the seat of Nelson County from its inception to the present. It consists of 105 properties with 176 total resources (134 contributing resources), including the Nelson County Courthouse listed separately on the National Register of Historic Places, forty-nine single dwellings, twenty-four commercial structures, six multiple dwellings, twenty-five sheds, three churches, five tavern/hotels, eleven offices, a theater, a cooper shop, a packing shed, a post office, a bank, a cemetery and two statues.

It was listed on the National Register of Historic Places in 2005.
