= Martins Store, Virginia =

Unincorporated community in Virginia, US

Coordinates: 37°55′3.50″N 78°50′25.08″W

Martins Store is an unincorporated community in Nelson County, Virginia, United States.
