= Howardsville, Albemarle County, Virginia =

Unincorporated community in Virginia, United States

Howardsville
- Unincorporated community
- Location within the Commonwealth of Virginia Howardsville (the United States)
- Coordinates: 37°44′05″N 78°38′50″W
- Country: United States
- State: Virginia
- County: Albemarle
- Time zone: UTC−5 (Eastern (EST))
  - Summer (DST): UTC−4 (EDT)
- GNIS feature ID: 1495724

Howardsville is an unincorporated community in Albemarle County, Virginia, United States.

Howardsville is named after one of its principal founders, Allen Howard, who settled the northern bank of the James River at the point where the Rockfish River, its largest tributary, enters its flow. Along with other families, such as the Andersons, Jordans, Cabells and Childresses, both sides of the river were settled by people moving up from the lower James to plant new lands with tobacco and other crops in the 1730s and 1740s. The area was also known for its limestone and iron ore deposits and a forge of some sort was established in the settlement from a very early date.

== History ==
Historical population
Census	Pop.	Note	%±
1870	83		—
U.S. Decennial Census

There is a stream that flows through the community called the Mullinax, which is probably a Native American word and may denote the name of a Native American village on this site that predated European settlement. Dozens of arrowheads, spearheads, stone bowls and other Native American artifacts have been found in the area. Probably the first contact Europeans had with the area were fur traders making their way up river from village to village.

The original community consisted of several large and medium plantations, as well as a landing for bateaux poling up and down the river. More settlers rapidly settled up the Rockfish River and along both sides of the James. In the mid-18th century, a road was cut along the north bank of the James - the James River Road - and another wound up the Rockfish to meet Secretary Sands' Road, which cut through the southern part of Albemarle County.

The settlement, probably called Howard’s Landing at the time, was created prior to the founding of Albemarle County so, along with Scottsville, a little further down river, is one of the founding communities of the county. It remains unique for being almost unchanged since the mid-18th century and early 19th century, with its two original historic plantation homes, one of the earliest Masonic Lodges in the state and also one of its earliest Methodist halls. The old tobacco prizery is still there, although its upper stories were burned down by Philip Sheridan during the Civil War. The old Howardsville Bank is also there, which printed its own bank notes and was a Civil War hospital and general store for much of its history. Both buildings date from the middle 18th century.

During the American Revolution, the village was known as Irving's Store. Because of its large, secure brick warehouse, its foundry, and other secure brick buildings, as well as its central location on the James River, with roads heading both east-west and north-south, it became one of the storage depots for the Virginia Militia and several letters of the time from the major in command at Irving's Store talk of difficulties in supplying the militia with armaments because of the low level of the river and lack of boats to transport goods. The foundry would have been useful to make bayonets and repair muskets and other military equipment. It is also mentioned that British cavalry under Colonel Tarleton tried to make a raid up the river from Richmond to destroy the arms depot.

During the early years of the 19th century, the community grew into a small town. It was on a prime location at the confluence of two rivers. Soapstone had been found just up the Rockfish River and was now being mined and the local planters were growing rich on tobacco. So, when the James River and Kanawha Canal was built through the town in the 1830s, the land around the canal was divided into lots and sold off, stores were built, two mills were erected, and there was a canal boat basin - probably for minor repairs and to store boats that were not using the canal. There was a lock and an aqueduct erected over the Rockfish, and a lock-keeper's cottage was built. It is from this period that the name 'Howardsville' was first used.

Within ten years of the canal coming to the town, local investors set up the Howardsville and Rockfish Gap Turnpike Company and during the 1840s cut a road from the river over the Blue Ridge Mountains and across the Shenandoah Valley south of Staunton all the way to the Appalachians. However, the turnpike was never successful. The community went on to thrive in the 1840s and 1850s.

During the Civil War, the foundry is known to have made sabers for the Confederate cavalry and a captain of cavalry was sent to the town to supervise their production. The town also supplied Robert E. Lee’s forces with food and the canal ran military supplies to his forces continuously during the war years, especially supplying Lee's army in Richmond during the last year of the war. Because of its industry and location on the canal, Union cavalry under Sheridan, which including a column led by George Custer, raided the Howardsville-Scottsville area in the spring of 1864, burning bridges, the foundry, the mills and several the houses. It burned and smashed the lock gates and aqueduct, destroyed canal boats carrying food and military supplies, raided the bank - though its gold had been secreted away just hours before the Union troops arrived – and Sheridan set up house in Monticola while his men pillaged the surrounding area. The invaders remained in the area for two-three days, raiding up and down the north bank of the James, unable to cross because the river was in spate and locals had destroyed all the bridges that crossed it. Triumphant, they eventually headed east down the river, to then turn northeast and circle Richmond to rejoin Grant's army.

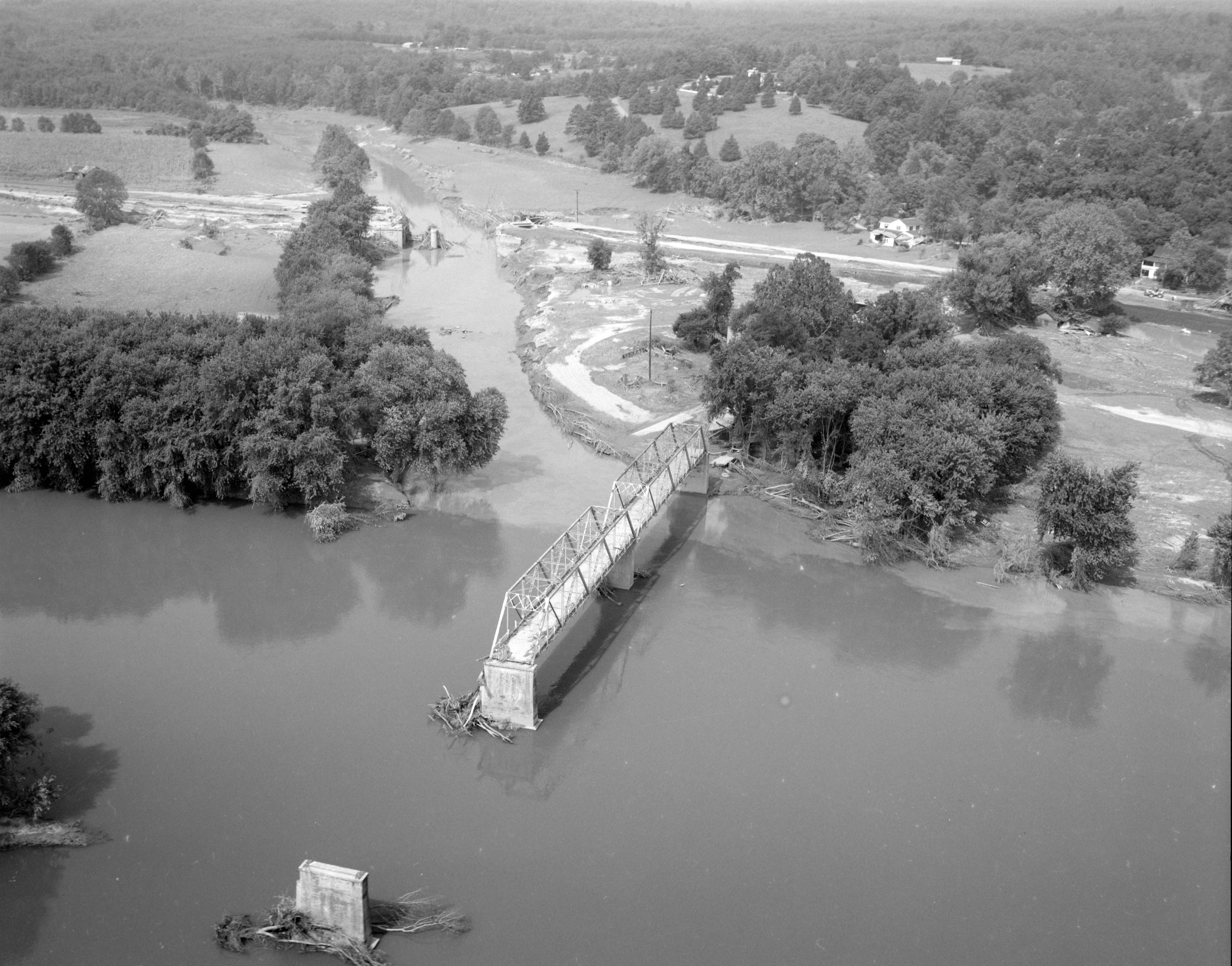
The confluence of the Rockfish and James Rivers at Howardsville, showing flooding damage in the aftermath of Hurricane Camille

After the Civil War, the community struggled to regain its former glory. Although a road bridge was built over the James River about 1911 to replace the old ferry, the community continued to decline. The foundry soon closed, the mercantile business struggled, the hotels had little business and the stores began to look a dowdy and rundown.

Howardsville’s population did not grow significantly during this time, and with the general urbanization of the 1950s, the community fell into decline. Hurricane Camille traveled along the Rockfish River in 1969 and swept away all the lower town that rested along the James River; many of the stores and the hotels were already in ruin or decline. The hurricane rose the James River by over 30 feet and inundated all the homes in the lower town. It swept away part of the road bridge over the James, destroyed the road and rail bridges over the Rockfish, and left a deluge of mud and torn up trees across the entire river floodplain.

== Present day ==
Around 25 people live within the community, but there is a wider area that associates with Howardsville and partakes in its social activities. The oldest, most historic homes, which were sheltered from hurricanes Camille and Agnes, remain, having been restored by their present owners. The current village is on the Virginia Birding Route and the Virginia Cycle Route. There is a bed and breakfast establishment and local farmers produce goat cheese, bread and other crops, though forestry is the main agricultural produce of the area. Soapstone is still quarried in nearby Schuyler. It has its own boat ramp, where kayakers, canoers and fishermen can embark and land.

Monticola and West Cote are listed on the National Register of Historic Places.

== In popular culture ==
The station and the stately home of Monticola, which is close by, featured in the 1941 movie Virginia starring Fred MacMurray and Madeleine Carroll, with one scene taking place at the train depot and numerous scenes being shot at the old home on the hill.

In the Twilight Zone episode "Ring-a-Ding Girl", the character Barbara "Bunny" Blake, played by Maggie McNamara, is a movie star from Howardsville; the episode concerns her wishes to attend the town's picnic. However, she is killed in a plane crash while en route to the event, and the plane is mentioned to have crashed within the town.
