= Colleen, Virginia =

Unincorporated community in Virginia, US

Coordinates: 37°42′34″N 78°55′52″W

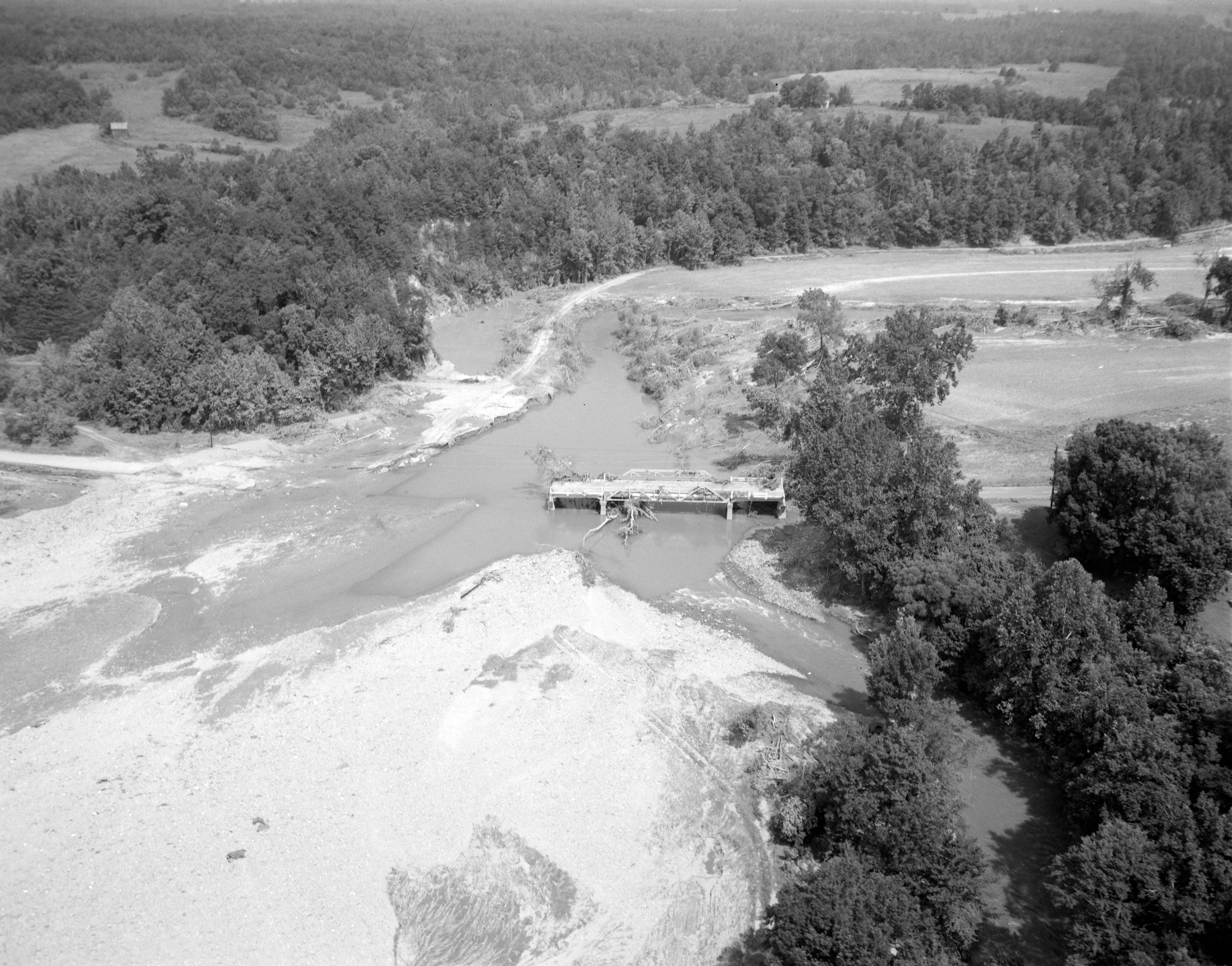
Flood damage in the vicinity of Colleen in the aftermath of Hurricane Camille

Colleen is an unincorporated community in Nelson County, Virginia, United States. It was originally named Cabellsville. From 1761, Colleen was the first seat of government of the original Amherst County, when the county court first met at Henry Key's home near this central location in the newly formed county and ordered William Cabell to survey the line dividing it from the former Albemarle County. The new courthouse was erected on Lunsford Lomax's land by March 1762. In 1807, Virginia's legislature formed Nelson County, so the county seat had to be relocated. The Amherst County judges met at New Glasgow (sometimes called Cabellsburg) and ordered a new courthouse built nearby. That frame courthouse was finished in 1810 and replaced by the current courthouse in 1870. Meanwhile, the Nelson County seat was transferred to Lovingston, and a courthouse built in 1809.
