= Avon, Virginia =

Unincorporated community in Virginia, US

Coordinates: 37.9999°N 78.8268°W

Avon is an unincorporated community in Nelson County, Virginia, United States.
