= Alcoma, Virginia =

Unincorporated community in Virginia, United States

- Unincorporated community
- Location within Virginia Location within the United States
- Coordinates: 37°32′56″N 78°35′32″W
- Country: United States
- State: Virginia
- County: Buckingham
- Elevation: 509 ft (155 m)
- Time zone: UTC-5 (Eastern (EST))
  - Summer (DST): UTC-4 (EDT)
- Area code: 434
- GNIS ID: 1492454

Alcoma is an unincorporated community in Buckingham County, in the U.S. state of Virginia.
