= Glenmore, Buckingham County, Virginia =

Unincorporated community in Virginia, United States

Coordinates: 37°40′18″N 78°35′24″W

Glenmore, Buckingham County is an unincorporated community in Buckingham County, in the U.S. state of Virginia.
