= Shady Lane, Virginia =

Unincorporated community in Virginia, US

Coordinates: 37°42′53″N 79°01′21″W

Shady Lane is an unincorporated community in Nelson County, Virginia, United States.
