= Rockfish River =

Location
- Country: United States

Physical characteristics
- Source
  - location: Virginia
  - elevation: 560 feet (170 m)
- Mouth
  - location: James River
  - coordinates: 37°43′58″N 78°38′43″W
  - elevation: 295 feet (90 m)
- Length: 28.7 mi (46.2 km)

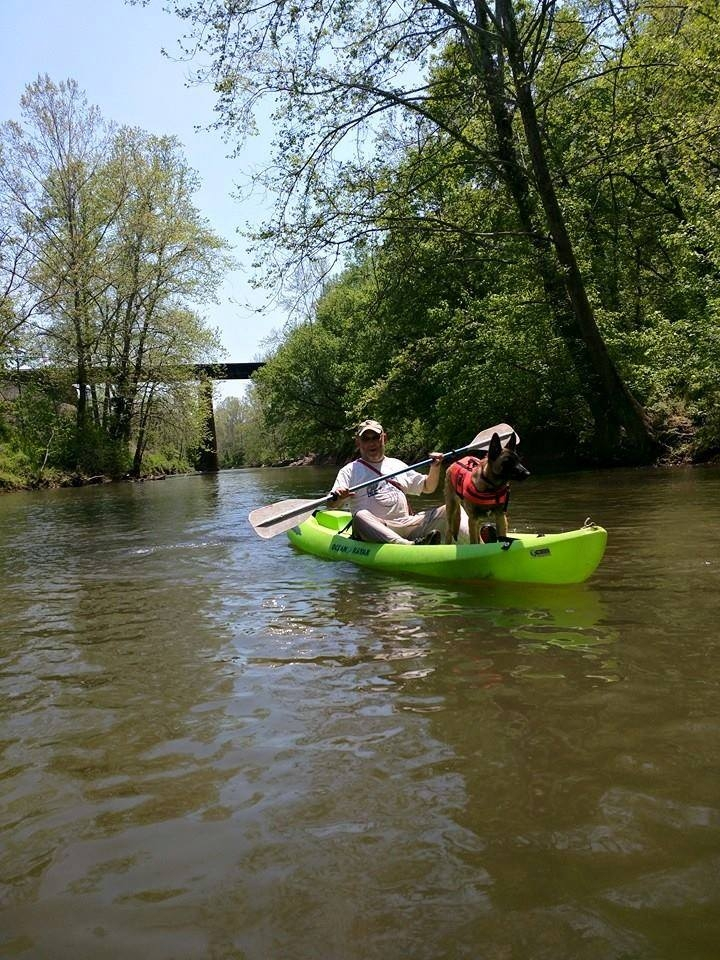
Kayaking the Rockfish river in Nelson County.

The Rockfish River is a 28.7-mile-long (46.2 km) tributary of the James River in central Virginia in the United States. Via the James River, it is part of the watershed of the Chesapeake Bay.

== Course ==
The Rockfish River is formed in Nelson County, Virginia, by the confluence of its North and South Forks (37°54′13″N 78°49′58″W), both of which rise in the Blue Ridge Mountains near the Blue Ridge Parkway. It flows generally southeastwardly through northern Nelson County; in its lower course the river is used to define the boundary between Nelson and Albemarle counties. It enters the James River from the northwest on the common boundary of the two counties, about 8 miles (13 km) southwest of Scottsville.

== Etymology ==
Rockfish Valley is named for the fact that before the dams on the James River were constructed, rockfish ran from the bays as far west as the valley.

== See also ==
- List of Virginia rivers

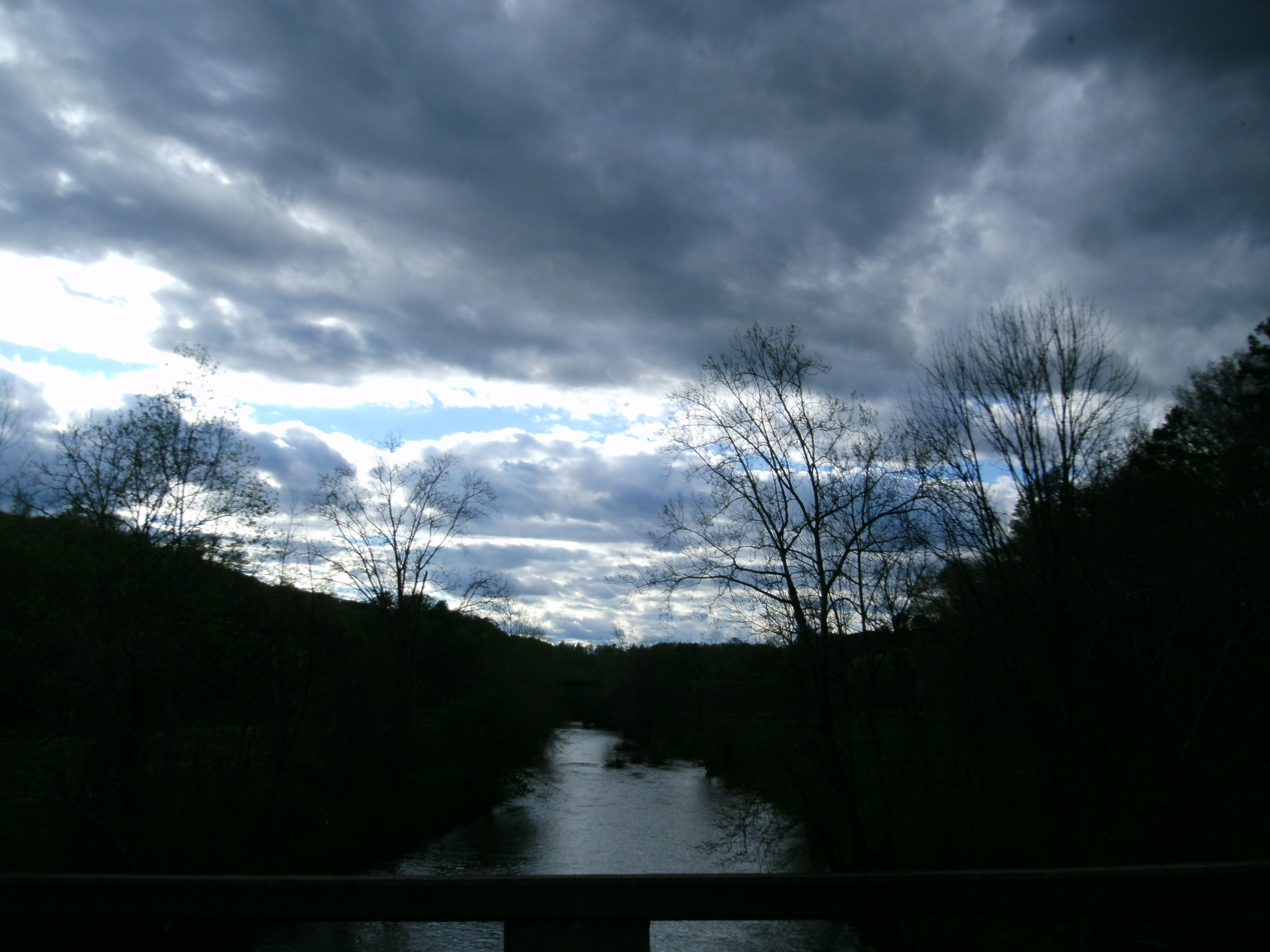
The Rockfish River from the Laurel road bridge.

== Sources ==
- Columbia Gazetteer of North America entry
- DeLorme (2005). Virginia Atlas & Gazetteer. Yarmouth, Maine: DeLorme. ISBN 0-89933-326-5.
- "Rockfish River". Geographic Names Information System. United States Geological Survey, United States Department of the Interior. 28 September 1979.
