= Lanes Ford, Virginia =

Unincorporated community in Virginia, US

Coordinates: 37°45′13″N 78°59′10″W

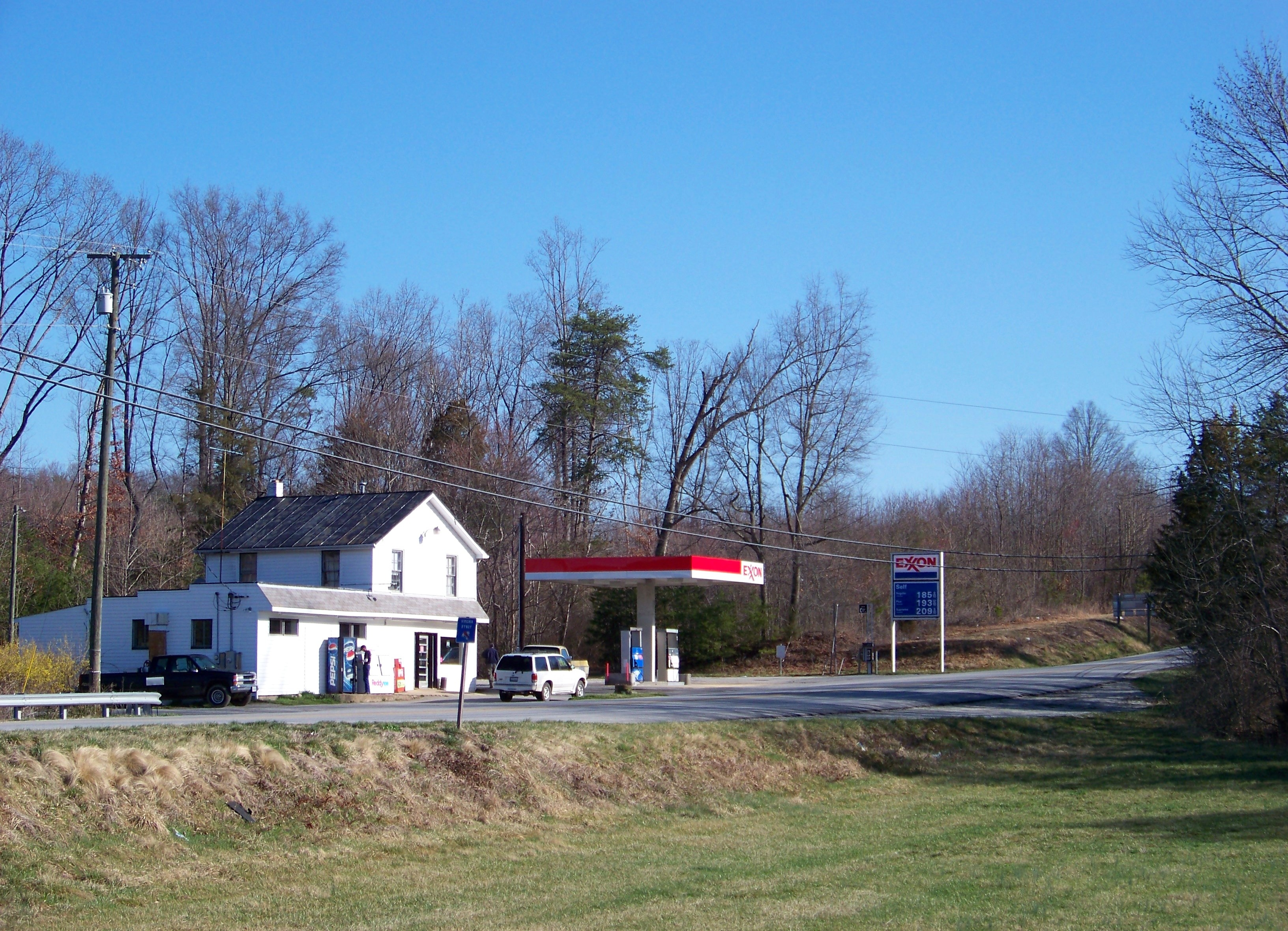
Store in Lanes Ford

Lanes Ford is an unincorporated community in Nelson County, Virginia, United States.
