= Lovingston, Virginia =

County seat of Nelson, Virginia

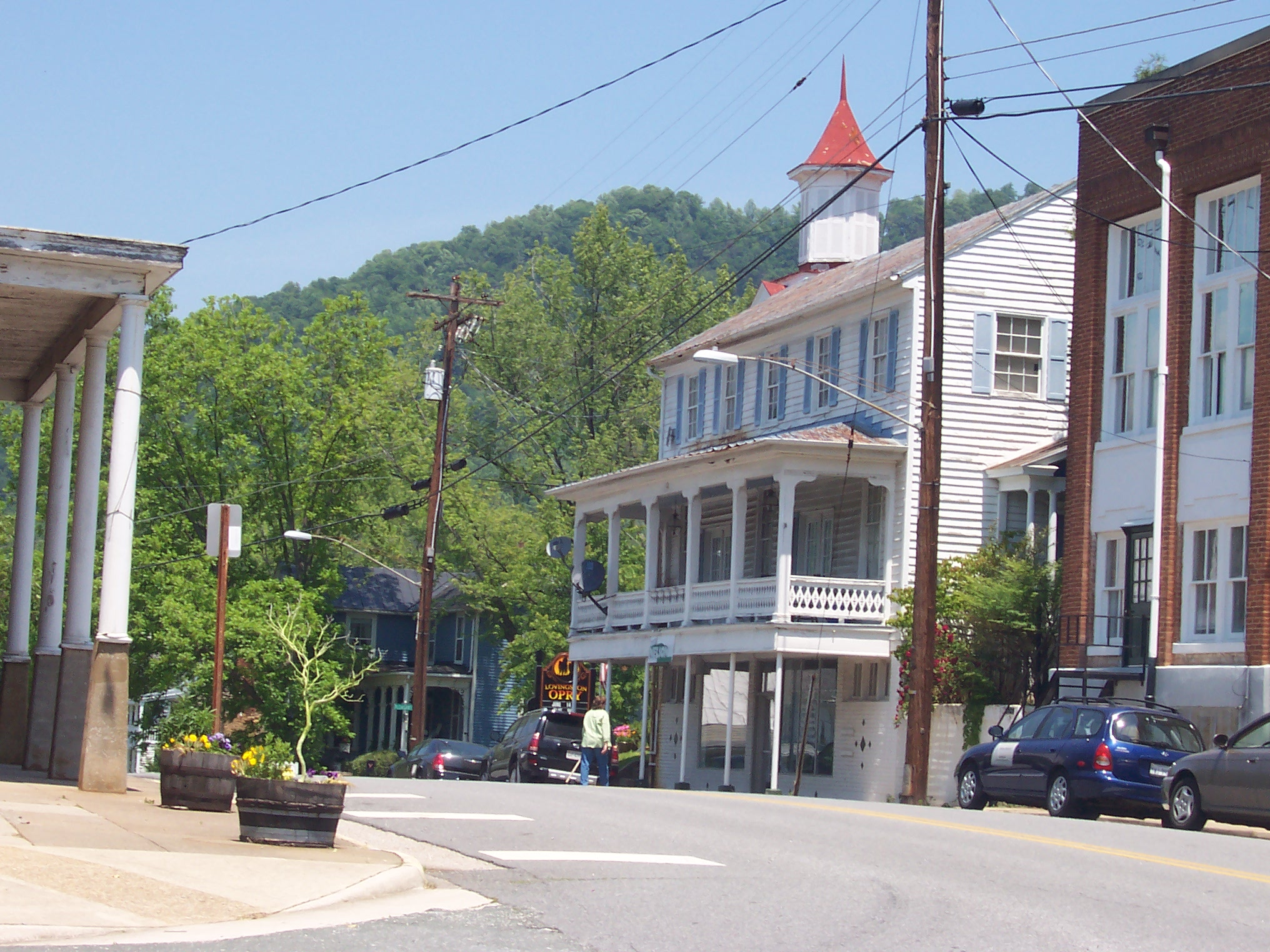
- Front Street in Lovingston
- Coordinates: 37°45′46″N 78°52′15″W
- Country: United States
- State: Virginia
- County: Nelson County
- Founded: 1809

Area
  - Total: 4.03 sq mi (10.44 km^{2})
  - Land: 4.03 sq mi (10.44 km^{2})
  - Water: 0 sq mi (0 km^{2})
- Elevation: 817 ft (249 m)

Population (2010)
  - Total: 520
  - Density: 129.0/sq mi (49.81/km^{2})
- Time zone: UTC-5 (EST)
  - Summer (DST): UTC-4 (EDT)
- ZIP code: 22949
- Area code: 434
- FIPS code: 51-47224
- GNIS feature ID: 1498508

Lovingston is a census-designated place (CDP) in and the county seat of Nelson County, Virginia, United States. As of the 2020 census, Lovingston had a population of 503. Its ZIP code is 22949. It was among the communities severely affected by flash flooding from Hurricane Camille in 1969.

Lovingston is part of the Charlottesville metropolitan area.

Lovingston High School, Lovingston Historic District, and the Nelson County Courthouse are listed on the National Register of Historic Places.

== History ==
The town was formed in 1807 and has been the county seat of Nelson County since 1809 when the courthouse was built in the center of town. The original 30-acre parcel of land on which the town sits was given by the Loving family, a very influential family over the years of the town's history. The town is dominated by the courthouse in the center of town with a grid pattern of streets surrounding it. Front, Second, and Spring streets (which are now Route 29) run in a north–south direction, while Main and Pleasant streets run in an east–west direction. The layout of the town was designed by George W. Varnum and the original design is still present today with very few alterations.

=== Courthouse Square ===
The courthouse is a significant marker of Lovingston's history as a courthouse town. It was the first public building built after the town's formation in 1807, and expansions have enabled it to remain in use to the present. Notable buildings in the square include the Whitehead Law office, the First Clerk's office, and the original jail that was based on a design from Thomas Jefferson.

Along Court Street were several taverns and hotels where people would gather to dine and rest on court days. Court days were a weekly event that would bring people from all over the county. The entire square would be filled with court attendees and their families picnicking and socializing.

The courthouse was designed by Shelton Crosthwait and is derived from the English town hall plan featuring a two-story temple front with a ground floor arcaded piazza. This design bridges the gap between colonial courthouse design and the Jeffersonian temple form.

=== Hurricane Camille ===
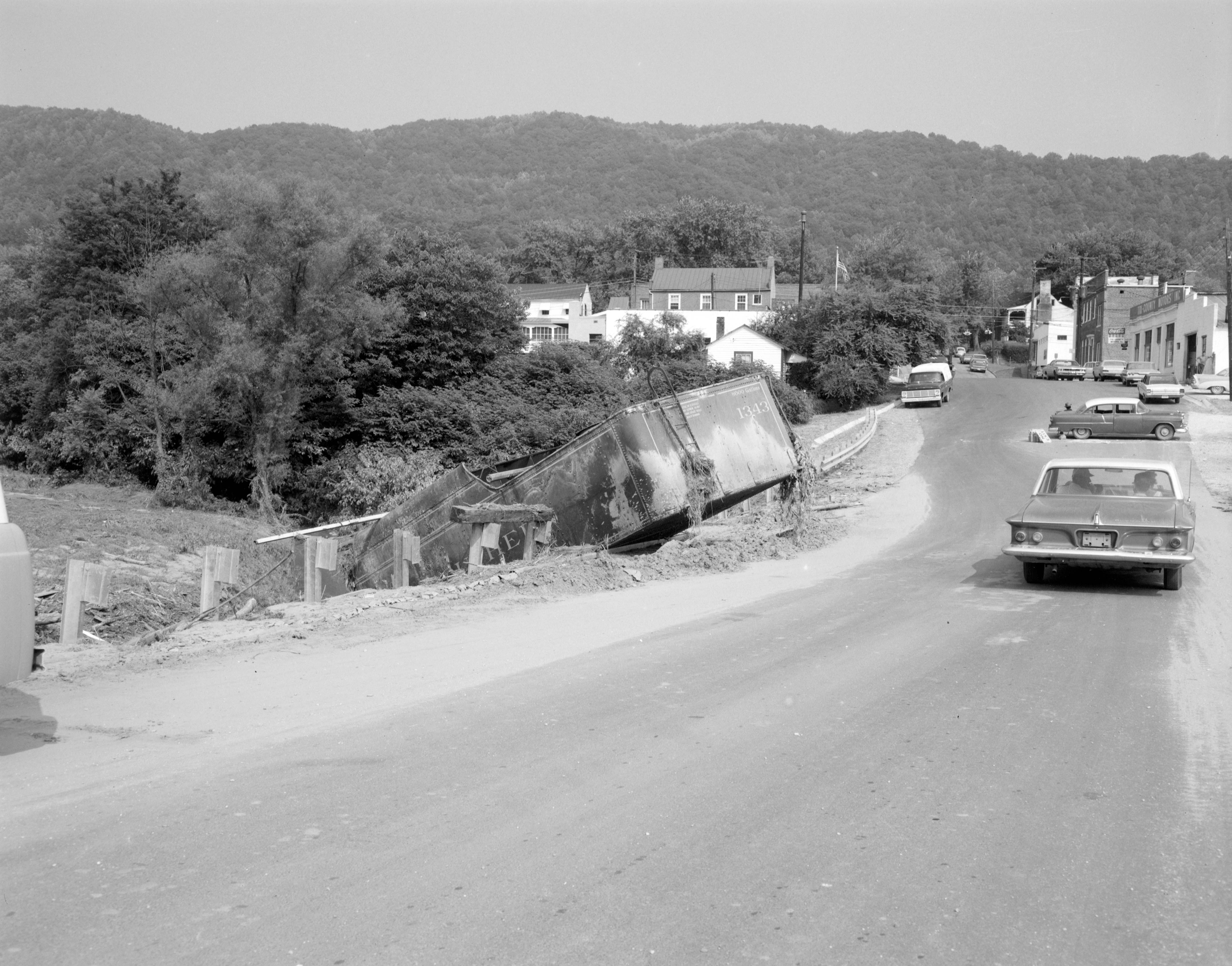
Damage from Hurricane Camille on the outskirts of Lovingston

The hurricane of 1969 was a profound event that has had a lasting impact on Lovingston. Dr. Robert H. Simpson at the National Hurricane Center called Hurricane Camille "the greatest recorded storm ever to hit a heavily populated area of the Western hemisphere." Thirty-three inches of measured rain fell in a short period of five hours in town, the day prior five inches in a half-hour and 153 Virginians were killed, three of whom lived in Lovingston, and some still missing. Many buildings were destroyed (207) and 70 more were damaged. The town was sited to avoid heavy flooding; however, the surrounding areas were more severely damaged, including the communities of Massie's Mill, Roseland, Bryant, and many others. Lovingston served as the center of rescue and recovery operations after the storm. 185 miles of road were severely damaged or lost in the flood.

The 153 Nelson County residents lost to Hurricane Camille have been commemorated in a number of ways over the years. In the Courthouse Square stands a monument honoring the 153 Nelson County residents who died in the tragedy.

=== Historic District ===
The town has been recognized on the Virginia Landmarks Register and the National Register of Historic Places since 2005 with 134 contributing buildings and sites within 225-acre designated historic area. Architectural styles present include Federal, Greek Revival, Gothic Revival, Italianate, Colonial Revival, Dutch Colonial Revival, Craftsman, and Modern Movements, as well as commercial and governmental buildings.

== Geography ==
Lovingston is located in Nelson County in the center of the Commonwealth of Virginia along U.S. 29, just west of Peebles Mountain. The village has a total area of 4.03 square miles (10.44 km2), all land.

Lovingston is 147 miles (237 km) from Washington, D.C. and 102 miles (164 km) from Richmond.

=== Climate ===
Lovingston has a four-season humid subtropical climate, with all months being well-watered, though the period from May to September is the wettest. Winters are somewhat cool, with a January average of 34.5 °F (1.4 °C). Spring and autumn provide transitions of reasonable length. Summers are hot and humid, with July averaging 75.6 °F(24.2 °C). Snowfall is highly variable from year to year but is normally light and does not remain on the ground for long, averaging 17.1 inches (43.4 cm).

== Demographics ==
Historical population
Census	Pop.	Note	%±
2010	520		—
2020	503		−3.3%
U.S. Decennial Census; 2010 2020

Lovingston was first listed as a census designated place in the 2010 U.S. census.

As of the 2010 census, there were 520 people, 231 households, and 114 families residing in the town. There were 262 housing units. The racial makeup of the city was 72.5% White, 19.6% Black or African American, 0.6% Native American, 1.3% Asian, 1.2% from other races, and 4.8% from two or more races. 2.7% of the population were Hispanics or Latinos of any race.

Of the 231 households, 21.6% had children under the age of 18 living with them, 14.2% were married couples living together, 14.7% had a female householder with no husband present, and 50.6% were non-families. 46.8% of all households were made up of individuals, and 37.2% had someone living alone who was 65 years of age or older.

The age distribution was 16.5% under the age of 18 and 20.4% who were 65 years of age or older. The median age was 53.5 years.

The median income for a household in the city was $26,964, and the median income for a family was $70,486. The per capita income for the city was $22,411. About 6% of the population was below the poverty line.

== Government ==
Lovingston became an independent town in 1871 and was de-incorporated in 1938. It has been the second seat of Nelson County since its formation in 1807, when Colleen was the original seat of Government for what is Amherst County, from also which Nelson County split away. Lovingston has been home to the courthouse since its construction in 1809. Lovingston sits in the 59th District of the Virginia House of Delegates, represented by Republican Matt Fariss and the 25th District of the Senate of Virginia, represented by Democrat Creigh Deeds. Federally, Lovingston is part of Virginia's 5th congressional district, represented by Republican John McGuire, elected in 2024.

== Points of interest ==
=== Kilmartin's Pharmacy ===
The white building at 622 Front Street was established as a livery and inn for travelers on the Stage Road in the early 1800s. The lower section was altered to accommodate for retail space in the 1930s, but there were once stables where guests would keep their horses on the street level. During the American Civil War, the Inn was occupied by Confederate Soldiers and used as a hospital for soldiers wounded in nearby battles. The apartments on the second level have been home to several individual tenants and families up to the present day, including the pastors of Lovingstons's four Baptist churches and their families during the early 1900s. The property is best known as the home to the local pharmacy, which was opened by Dr. E.B. Rowan in 1932 and was later managed by Dr. Joseph Kilmartin. Doctor Kilmartin's Pharmacy was a popular place for residents of Lovingston to spend time, as it boasted some of the best milk shakes in Nelson County. Dr. Kilmartin retired in 1971, but the drug store remained open until 1980.

=== The Orchard House ===
The Orchard House was built in 1874 as the second home of Judge John D. Horsley, who served at the Courthouse. His son Thomas (Thos for short) M. Horsley took up residence here, making a successful orchard business named Village View that overlooked Lovingston. After Thomas' untimely death, his sorrowful widow let the orchard fall into ruin. Suddenly she rolled up her sleeves and rescued it, eventually remarrying. The Orchard was operable until 1962. It is now a central Virginia bed and breakfast.

=== The Mountain Cove Vineyard ===
The vineyard owned by AI Weed, who was the second president of the Virginia Winery Association, was founded in 1973. It sits on 600 acres outside the historic district of Lovingston. Robert Lee Camden owned the property from 1910 to 1935. The land was used for the apple, corn, tobacco, and cattle businesses. The original buildings in the vineyard were built around 1860 and are still in use for storage. Clarence T. Wright, nephew of R. L. Camden and a local mail carrier, inherited the property in 1935 and died in 1968.

=== Nelson Hall ===
Lovingston was once home to Nelson County's only movie theater, Nelson Hall, which was moved to Front Street from the nearby Oak Ridge estate in the 1920s. Manager J. H. McClellan bought the theater in 1945, and added a brick lobby with upstairs apartment to the front of the original two-story wooden structure shortly after. The theater seats 300 on the first level, and 99 in a balcony accessed by a separate entrance on the south side; during segregation, African American patrons could sit in the balcony only.

At its peak, the theater showed one movie on weeknights, two on Saturday nights, and a matinée and two evening shows on Sunday. On Thursday nights, the film was preceded by a live stage show, often local musicians or travelling Vaudeville shows. McClellan managed the theater until 1970, and Nelson Hall closed in 1973. The building has since been intermittently used as a performance space and church.

=== Bright Hope Baptist Church ===
Bright Hope Baptist Church is Lovingston's most historic African-American landmark. Located on a prominent site overlooking the village from the west, the church and a school (no longer standing) were built by the American Missionary Association around 1870 to serve the freedmen and women of Nelson County. The church cemetery has over 100 marked graves in the kept area.

== Notable people ==
A small number of celebrities were born in or near Lovingston. These individuals have helped put Lovingston on the map.

- Leslie Bibb, actress
- DeLane Fitzgerald, college football coach and current coach at NCAA D1 Southern Utah University
- Jimmy Fortune, country singer and tenor for The Statler Brothers
- W. A. R. Goodwin, pastor and "Father of Colonial Williamsburg"
- Walter Loving
- Thomas Whitehead, politician, lawyer, merchant, and newspaper editor
