= Charlottesville metropolitan area =

Charlottesville metropolitan area Charlottesville, Virginia Metropolitan Area
- Metropolitan Statistical Area
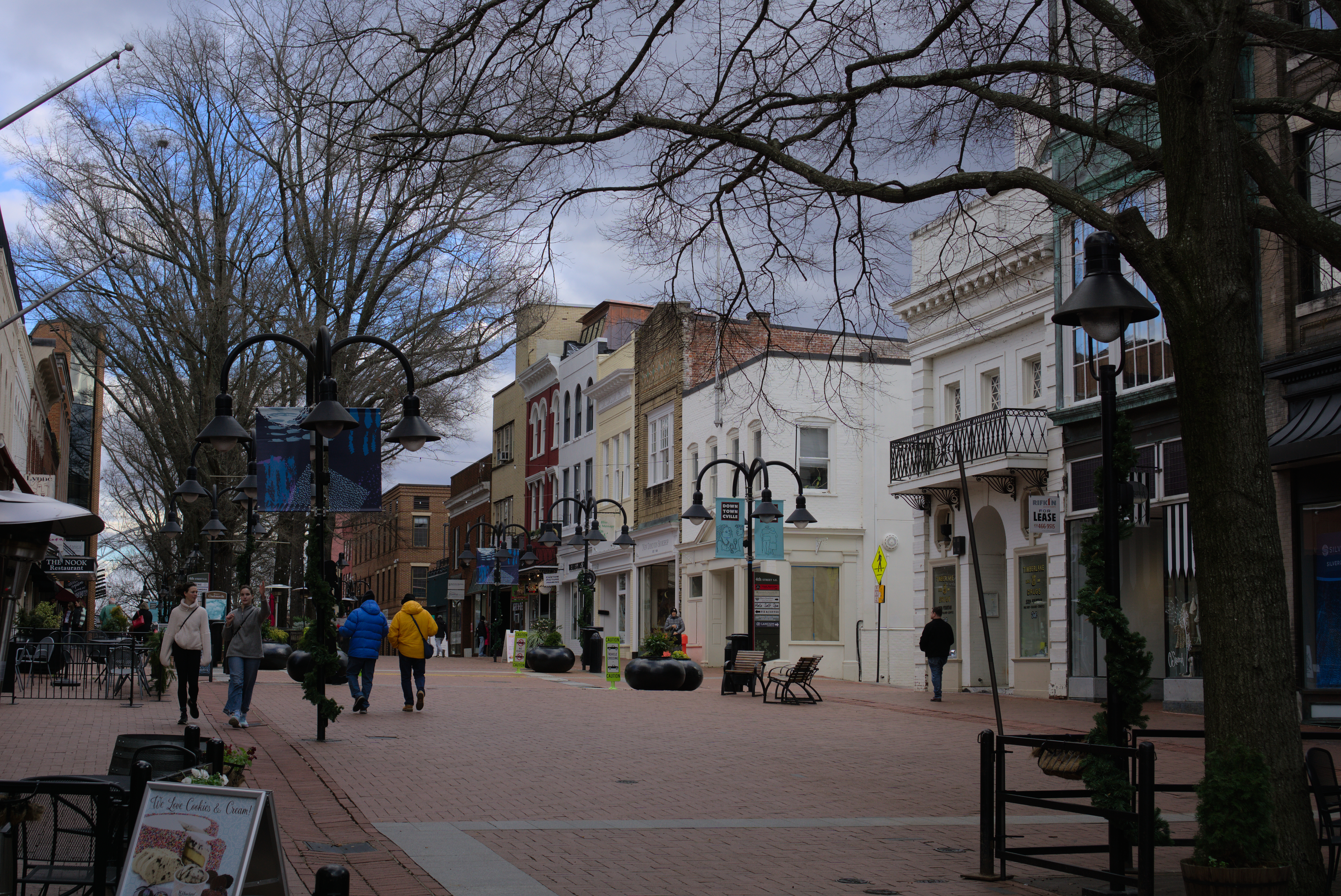
- Charlottesville Downtown Mall
Interactive Map of Charlottesville, VA MSA
City of Charlottesville
Charlottesville, VA MSA
- Country: United States
- State: Virginia
- Principal city: Charlottesville
- Time zone: UTC−8 (EST)
  - Summer (DST): UTC−7 (EDT)

The Charlottesville Metropolitan Statistical Area is a Metropolitan Statistical Area (MSA) in the Piedmont region of the Commonwealth of Virginia as defined by the Office of Management and Budget (OMB). The combined population is 221,524 (2020 census), not including Buckingham County, which was removed from the MSA in the 2020 census cycle.

== MSA components ==
Note: Since a constitutional change in 1871, all cities in the state are independent cities. The OMB considers these independent cities to be county-equivalents for the purpose of defining MSAs in Virginia.

There are four counties and one independent city that contribute to the Charlottesville Metropolitan Statistical Area.

- Counties
  - Albemarle
  - Fluvanna
  - Greene
  - Nelson
- Independent Cities
  - Charlottesville

== Communities ==
=== Places with more than 10,000 inhabitants ===
- Charlottesville (Principal city)
- Lake Monticello (CDP)

=== Places with 1,000 to 10,000 inhabitants ===
- Crozet (CDP)
- Hollymead (CDP)
- Pantops (CDP)
- Piney Mountain (CDP)
- Rio (CDP)
- Rivanna (CDP)
- Twin Lakes (CDP)
- University of Virginia (CDP)

=== Places with less than 1,000 inhabitants ===
- Columbia (CDP)
- Lovingston (CDP)
- Palmyra (CDP)
- Scottsville (incorporated town in Albemarle County)
- Stanardsville (incorporated town in Greene County)

=== Unincorporated places ===
- Adial
- Afton
- Allens Creek
- Amicus
- Arrington
- Avon
- Barboursville (partial)
- Barnes
- Beech Grove
- Bellair
- Bryant
- Buffalo Springs
- Burtonville
- Caskie
- Colleen
- Dawsonville
- Durrett Town
- Dyke
- Earlysville
- Elma
- Esmont
- Faber
- Five Forks
- Four Forks
- Free Union
- Freshwater
- Geer
- Gladstone
- Gordon Crossing
- Greenfield
- Greenway
- Gullysville
- Haneytown
- Hendersons Store
- Ivy
- Jonesboro
- Keene
- Keswick
- Kingswood
- Lakeview Heights
- Lanes Ford
- Lodebar
- Lovingston
- Lowesville
- Lydia
- Martins Store
- Massies Mill
- McMullen
- Midway Mills
- Montebello
- Nash
- Nellysford
- Newtown
- Norwood
- Oak Ridge
- Old Myndus
- Onan
- Ottoway
- Palmyra
- Piedmont
- Pirkey
- Poplar Flats
- Quinque
- Ramsey
- Red Apple Orchard
- Rockfish
- Roseland
- Roses Mill
- Ruckersville
- Saint George
- Schuyler
- Shady Grove
- Shady Lane
- Shipman
- Simmons Gap
- Swannanoa
- Troy
- Twin Poplars
- Tye River
- Tyro
- Upper Pocosin
- Warminster
- White Rock
- Williams Fork
- Wingina
- Wintergreen
- Woods Mill

== Demographics ==
As of the census of 2000, there were 174,021 people, 67,575 households, and 42,840 families residing within the MSA. The racial makeup of the MSA was 80.77% White, 14.07% African American, 0.16% Native American, 2.68% Asian, 0.03% Pacific Islander, 0.80% from other races, and 1.50% from two or more races. Hispanic or Latino of any race were 2.23% of the population.

The median income for a household in the MSA was $42,166, and the median income for a family was $50,225. Males had a median income of $32,974 versus $26,579 for females. The per capita income for the MSA was $21,574.

As of the 2020 census, there were 221,524 people residing within the MSA. The racial makeup of the MSA was 71% White, 14.2% African American, 1.6% Native American, 6.8% Asian, and 0.2% Pacific Islander. Hispanic or Latino of any race were 6.4% of the population.

== Politics ==
Presidential election results
Year	Republican	Democratic	Others
1960	54.1% 8,897	45.0% 7,404	0.9% 149
1964	46.6% 10,023	52.9% 11,370	0.5% 98
1968	48.4% 13.012	30.0% 8,030	21.7% 5,841
1972	61.6% 19,222	36.7% 11,452	1.8% 551
1976	49.9% 19,664	48.9% 18,892	2.2% 872
1980	48.2% 21,504	42.4% 18,918	9.6% 4,213
1984	59.3% 28,642	40.2% 19.142	0.5% 247
1988	54.6% 28,117	44.2% 22,767	1.3% 653
1992	41.4% 25,834	45.9% 28,644	12.7% 7,979
1996	45.0% 27,115	48.0% 28,903	6.9% 4,178
2000	48.7% 33,575	45.7% 32,129	6.4% 4,524
2004	47.4% 39,928	51.5% 43,374	1.2% 909
2008	39.6% 39,701	59.2% 59,247	1.2% 1,208
2012	42.3% 47,904	56.0% 63,371	1.7% 1,908
2016	36.8% 43,293	56.7% 66,747	6.8% 7,952
2020	36.2% 48,275	61.8% 82,537	2.0% 2,643

The Charlottesville metropolitan area leans Democratic. Similar to other college towns, Charlottesville City is a Democratic stronghold. Albemarle County leans Democratic, paralleling the entire region, since it houses urban, suburban, exurban, and rural pockets. Fluvanna and Greene counties are Republican strongholds as they are composed of suburban, exurban, and rural areas, which vote more conservative than their urban counterparts. Although Nelson County is almost entirely rural, it is the most moderate jurisdiction in the region, voting for the Democratic nominee Barack Obama in the 2008 and 2012 presidential elections and the Republican nominee Donald Trump in the 2016 and 2020 presidential elections, respectively.

The entire region, apart from Greene County and a sliver of Albemarle County, which are located in Virginia's 7th congressional district, represented by Democrat Abigail Spanberger, is located in Virginia's 5th congressional district, represented by Republican Bob Good. The 7th district has an even Cook PVI score while the 5th district has a R+7 score.

== See also ==
- List of U.S. Metropolitan Statistical Areas in Virginia
- Virginia census statistical areas
