= National Register of Historic Places listings in Greene County, Virginia =

Location of Greene County in Virginia

This is a list of the National Register of Historic Places listings in Greene County, Virginia.

This is intended to be a complete list of the properties and districts on the National Register of Historic Places in Greene County, Virginia, United States. The locations of National Register properties and districts for which the latitude and longitude coordinates are included below, may be seen in an online map.

There are 9 properties and districts listed on the National Register in the county, including 1 National Historic Landmark.

This National Park Service list is complete through NPS recent listings posted March 6, 2026.

== Current listings ==
	Name on the Register	Image	Date listed	Location	City or town	Description
1	Beadles House	Beadles House	November 22, 2000 (#00001433)	515 Greene Acres Rd. 38°19′24″N 78°27′19″W	Stanardsville	
2	Gibson Memorial Chapel and Martha Bagby Battle House at Blue Ridge School	Gibson Memorial Chapel and Martha Bagby Battle House at Blue Ridge School	April 29, 1993 (#93000349)	Western side of Bacon Hollow Rd., northwest of its junction with Dyke Rd. 38°16′01″N 78°33′24″W	Dyke	
3	Greene County Courthouse	Greene County Courthouse	February 26, 1970 (#70000799)	South of the junction of U.S. Route 33 and Blakey Ave. 38°17′47″N 78°26′23″W	Stanardsville	
4	Locust Grove	Locust Grove	September 25, 1987 (#87001733)	Davis Rd. 38°14′34″N 78°27′43″W	Amicus	
5	A.J. Long Mill		September 15, 2020 (#100005576)	4147 Simmons Gap Rd. 38°16′00″N 78°36′23″W	Free Union vicinity	
6	Octonia Stone	Octonia Stone	September 15, 1970 (#70000800)	North of Stanardsville, off Octonia Rd. 38°19′59″N 78°27′14″W	Stanardsville	
7	Powell–McMullan House	Powell–McMullan House	November 21, 2002 (#02001367)	233 McMullen Mill Rd. 38°20′59″N 78°27′31″W	Stanardsville	
8	Skyline Drive Historic District	Skyline Drive Historic District	April 28, 1997 (#97000375)	Shenandoah National Park, from the north entrance station at Front Royal to the south entrance station at the Rockfish Gap; 38°23′14″N 78°30′32″W	Luray	
9	Stanardsville Historic District	Stanardsville Historic District	May 27, 2004 (#04000555)	Roughly along Main St., from Monroe Ave. to Lambs Ln., including parts of Madison Rd. 38°17′50″N 78°26′24″W	Stanardsville	

== See also ==
- List of National Historic Landmarks in Virginia
- National Register of Historic Places listings in Virginia
