= Locust Grove =

Locust Grove is the name of a number of places in the United States:

- Locust Grove, Arkansas
- Locust Grove, Georgia
- Locust Grove, Warren County, Indiana (extinct)
- Historic Locust Grove, near Louisville, Kentucky
- Locust Grove (La Plata, Maryland), listed on the NRHP in Charles County, Maryland
- Locust Grove, Garrett County, Maryland
- Locust Grove, Washington County, Maryland
- Locust Grove, New York
- Locust Grove (Poughkeepsie, New York), listed on the NRHP in Dutchess County, New York, also known as Samuel F. B. Morse House
- Locust Grove (Ingleside, North Carolina), listed on the NRHP in North Carolina
- Locust Grove, Adams County, Ohio
- Locust Grove, Licking County, Ohio
- Locust Grove, Mahoning County, Ohio
- Locust Grove, Oklahoma
- Locust Grove, Oregon, a ghost town
- Locust Grove (Bainbridge, Pennsylvania), listed on the NRHP in Pennsylvania
- Locust Grove (Castalian Springs, Tennessee), listed on the NRHP in Tennessee
- Locust Grove, Orange County, Virginia
- Locust Grove, Shenandoah County, Virginia
- Locust Grove (Amicus, Virginia), listed on the NRHP in Virginia
- Locust Grove (Dillwyn, Virginia), listed on the NRHP in Virginia
- Locust Grove (Charlottesville, Virginia), listed on the NRHP in Virginia
- Locust Grove (Lynchburg, Virginia), listed on the NRHP in Virginia
- Locust Grove (Page County, Virginia), a historic house
- Locust Grove (Purcellville, Virginia), listed on the NRHP in Virginia
- Locust Grove (Rapidan, Virginia), listed on the NRHP in Virginia
