= Dawsonville =

Dawsonville may refer to:

== Places ==
In the United States

- Dawsonville, Georgia
- Dawsonville, Maryland
- Dawsonville, Missouri
- Dawsonville, Virginia

Elsewhere

- Dawsonville, Kenya
- Dawsonville, New Brunswick
