= Stanardsville Historic District =

Historic district in Virginia, United States

- U.S. National Register of Historic Places
- U.S. Historic district
- Virginia Landmarks Register
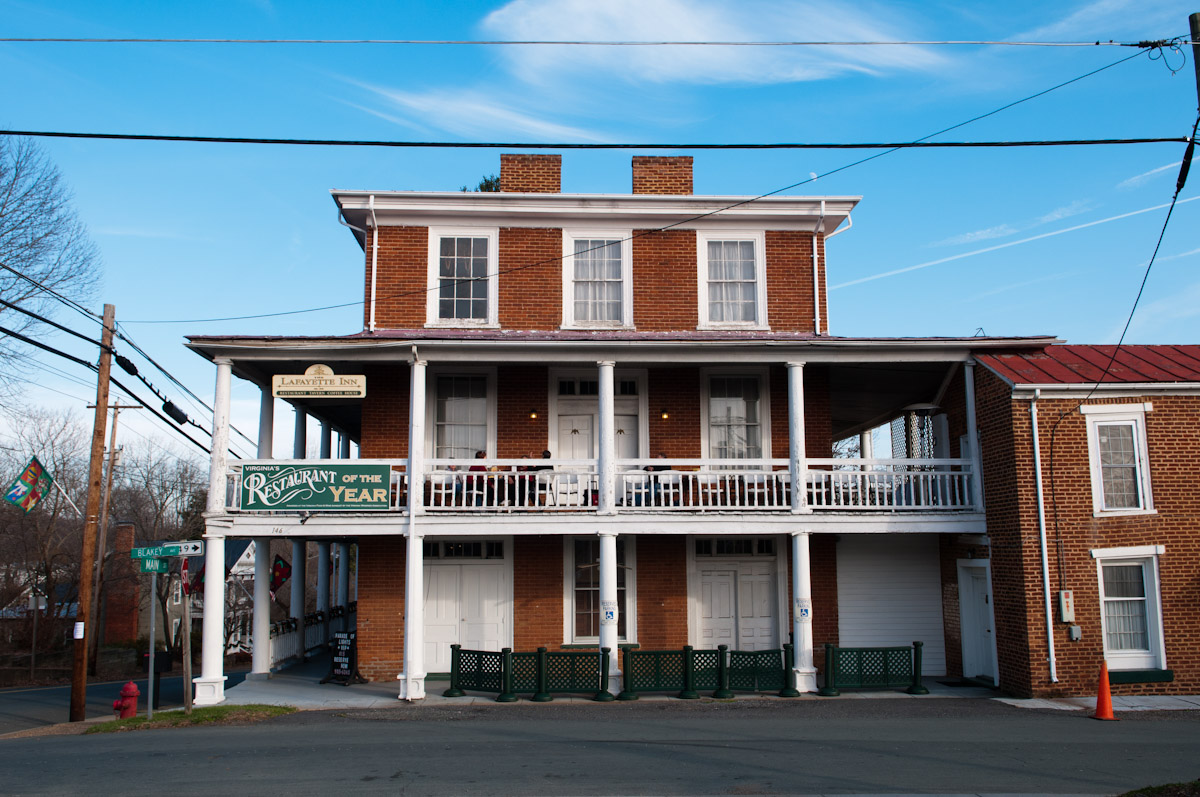
- The Lafayette Inn

- Location within Virginia Location within the United States
- Location: Roughly along Main St., from Monroe Ave. to Lambs Ln., including parts of Madison Rd., Stanardsville, Virginia
- Coordinates: 38°18′22″N 78°26′17″W
- Area: 200 acres (81 ha)
- Built: 1794
- Architectural style: Early Republic, Mid 19th Century Revival
- NRHP reference No.: 04000555
- VLR No.: 302-0012

Significant dates
- Added to NRHP: May 27, 2004
- Designated VLR: March 17, 2004

Stanardsville Historic District is a national historic district located at Stanardsville, Greene County, Virginia. The district encompasses 146 contributing buildings, 4 contributing sites, 9 contributing structures, and 8 contributing objects in the Town of Stanardsville. It includes the Courthouse Square district and surrounding commercial and residential areas. Notable buildings include the Stanardsville Methodist Church, Grace Episcopal Church (1901), Lafayette Hotel (c. 1840), Gibbons Store (c. 1845), John Sims house (1850), Greene County Chamber of Commerce (c. 1850), Forest Hill Academy (c. 1858), and Stanardsville Motor Company (1930). Located in the district is the separately listed Greene County Courthouse.

It was listed on the National Register of Historic Places in 2004.
