= Onan (disambiguation) =

Onan is a person in the biblical Book of Genesis.

Onan may also refer to:

== People ==
- Onán Barreiros (born 1981), Spanish sailor
- Onan Masaoka (born 1977), American Major League Baseball pitcher
- Onan Thom (born 1984), Guyanese swimmer who competed at the 2004 Summer Olympics
- Arzum Onan (born 1973), Turkish television actress
- Ömer Onan (born 1978), Turkish basketball player
- Yiğit Onan (born 2002), Turkish basketball player

== Other uses ==
- Ōnan, Shimane, Japan, a town
- Onan, Virginia, United States, an unincorporated community
- Onan, a line of generators manufactured by Cummins Power Systems, a subsidiary of Cummins

== See also ==
- Ryan O'Nan (born 1982), American actor, writer, and director
- Onans, French commune
- O.N.A.N., fictional organization in the novel Infinite Jest
- Onen, a mourner in Judaism
- Onen (surname)
- Onin (disambiguation)
