= Greenfield, Virginia =

Greenfield, Virginia, may refer to the following unincorporated communities:

- Greenfield, Nelson County, Virginia
- Greenfield, Pittsylvania County, Virginia
