= Greenway, Virginia =

Greenway, Virginia may refer to:

- Greenway, Charles City County, Virginia
- Greenway, Nelson County, Virginia
