= Four Forks =

Four Forks refers to:

- Four Forks, Richland Parish, Louisiana
- Four Forks, Virginia
- Four Forks, Spaxton, settlement in Somerset, England
