= Durrett =

Durrett is a surname. Notable people with the surname include:

- Alan Durrett (born 1948), Zambian swimmer
- Charles Durrett, American architect and author
- Ken Durrett (1948–2001), American professional basketball player
- Liz Durrett (born 1978), American singer-songwriter
- Red Durrett (1921–1992), American baseball player
- Reuben T. Durrett (1824–1913), American lawyer, jurist, linguist, poet, editor, journalist, history writer and bibliographer
- Rick Durrett, American mathematician
- Sylvana Ward Durrett, American film producer

== See also ==
- Durrett Town, Virginia
- Durrett-Jarratt House
