= Onen (surname) =

Onen is a surname. Notable people with the surname include:

- Abdulkadir Emin Önen (born 1976), Turkish politician
- Charles Onen, Ugandan 21st century priest and politician
- James Onen (born 1975), Ugandan radio presenter
- Jayden Onen (born 2001), English footballer
- Zafer Önen (1921– 2013), Turkish film actor

== See also ==
- Onan (disambiguation), which includes people with the surname
