= Locust Grove (Amicus, Virginia) =

Historic house in Virginia, United States

- U.S. National Register of Historic Places
- Virginia Landmarks Register
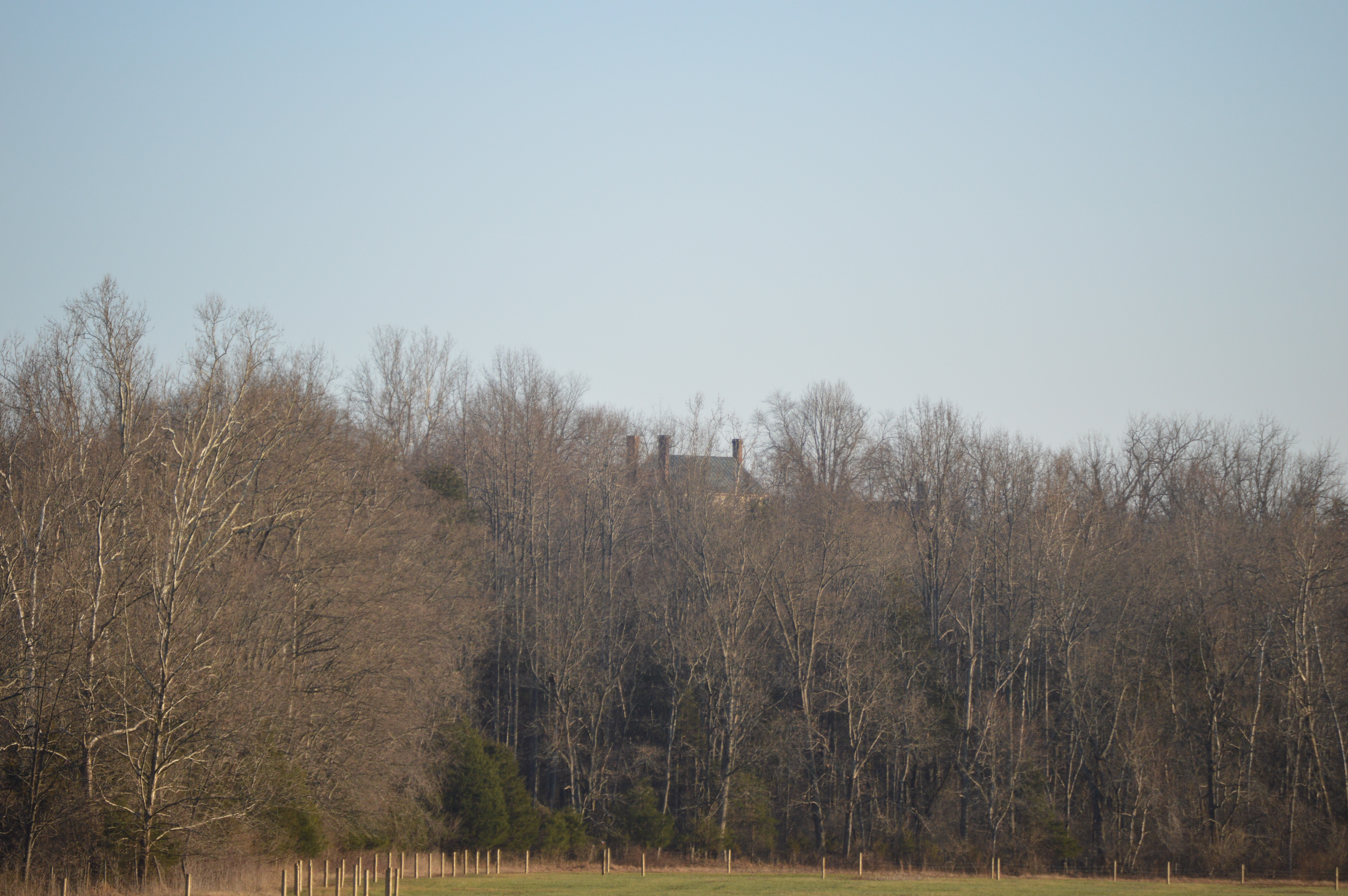
- Distant view from Amicus Road

- Location within Virginia Location within the United States
- Location: VA 641, near Amicus, Virginia
- Coordinates: 38°14′33″N 78°27′44″W
- Area: less than one acre
- Built: c. 1798
- NRHP reference No.: 87001733
- VLR No.: 039-0035

Significant dates
- Added to NRHP: September 25, 1987
- Designated VLR: June 17, 1987

Locust Grove is a historic home located near Amicus, Greene County, Virginia. It was built about 1798, and is a two-story, frame dwelling with a one-story wing. The main section has a metal-sheathed gable roof and exterior gable-end brick chimneys.

It was listed on the National Register of Historic Places in 1987.
