= Midway, Greene County, Virginia =

Unincorporated community in Virginia, United States

Coordinates: 38°14′15″N 78°23′10″W

Midway is an unincorporated community in Greene County, Virginia, United States. It lies at an elevation of 659 feet (201 m).
