= Octonia Stone =

- U.S. National Register of Historic Places
- Virginia Landmarks Register
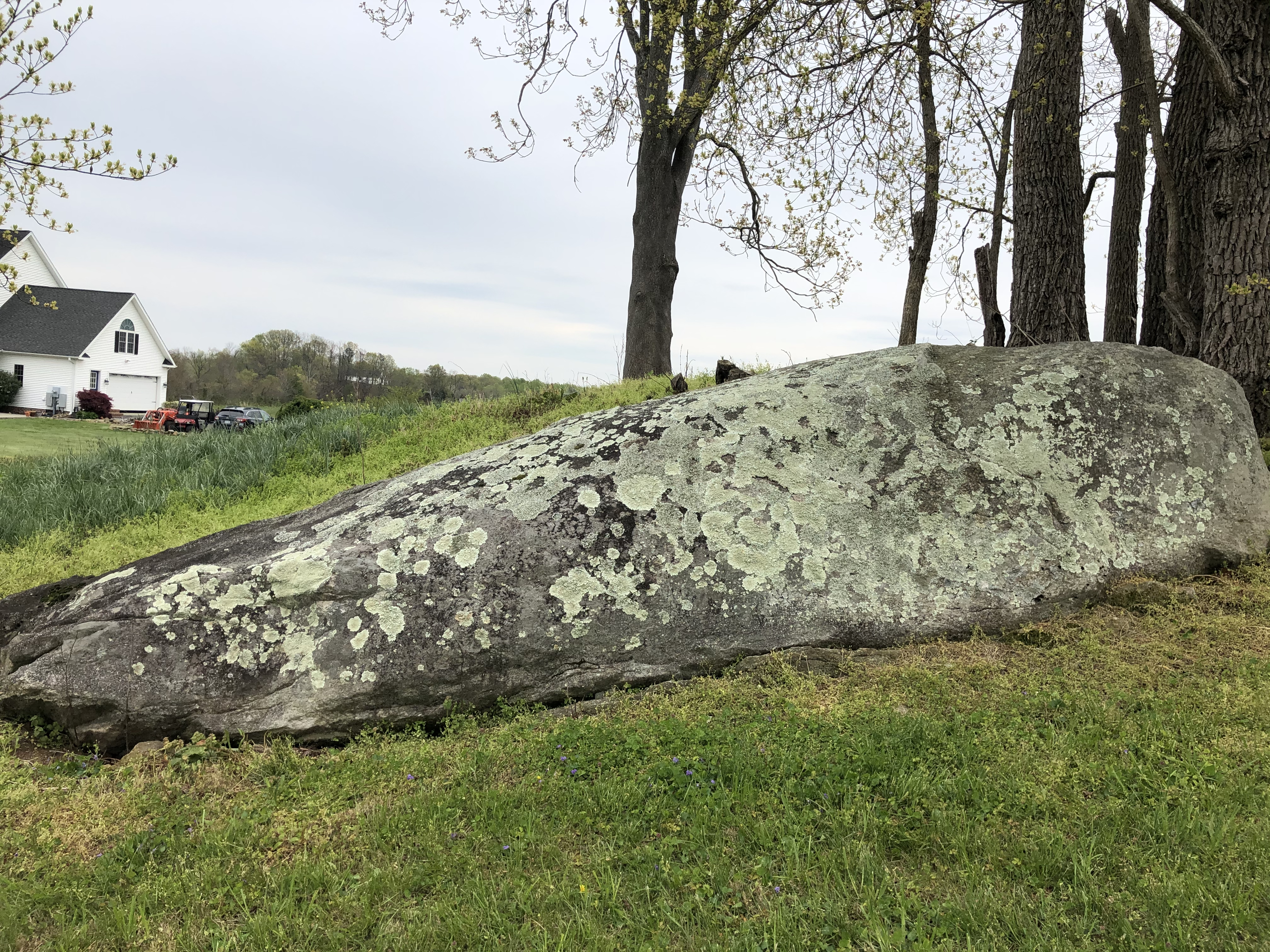
- Octonia Stone, 2020

- Location within Virginia Location within the United States
- Location: Off VA 637 north of Stanardsville, Virginia
- Coordinates: 38°19′59″N 78°27′14″W
- Area: 9.9 acres (4.0 ha)
- Built: 1721
- NRHP reference No.: 70000800
- VLR No.: 039-0003

Significant dates
- Added to NRHP: September 15, 1970
- Designated VLR: June 2, 1970

The Octonia Stone, also known as Octoney, Octeny, Octona, and Octuna Stone, is a historic boundary marker located near Stanardsville, Greene County, Virginia. The stone marks the terminus of the westernmost boundary line of the 24,000-acre Octonia Grant. It is a granite-type rock which is part of a natural outcropping in a hayfield. The stone is engraved with a figure 8, composed of two, nearly perfect circles, with a cross touching the top of the 8.

Correct coordinates are: (38.3337176, -78.4536142) - msw 11Nov2021

It was listed on the National Register of Historic Places in 1970.
