= Beadles House =

Historic house in Virginia, United States

- U.S. National Register of Historic Places
- Virginia Landmarks Register
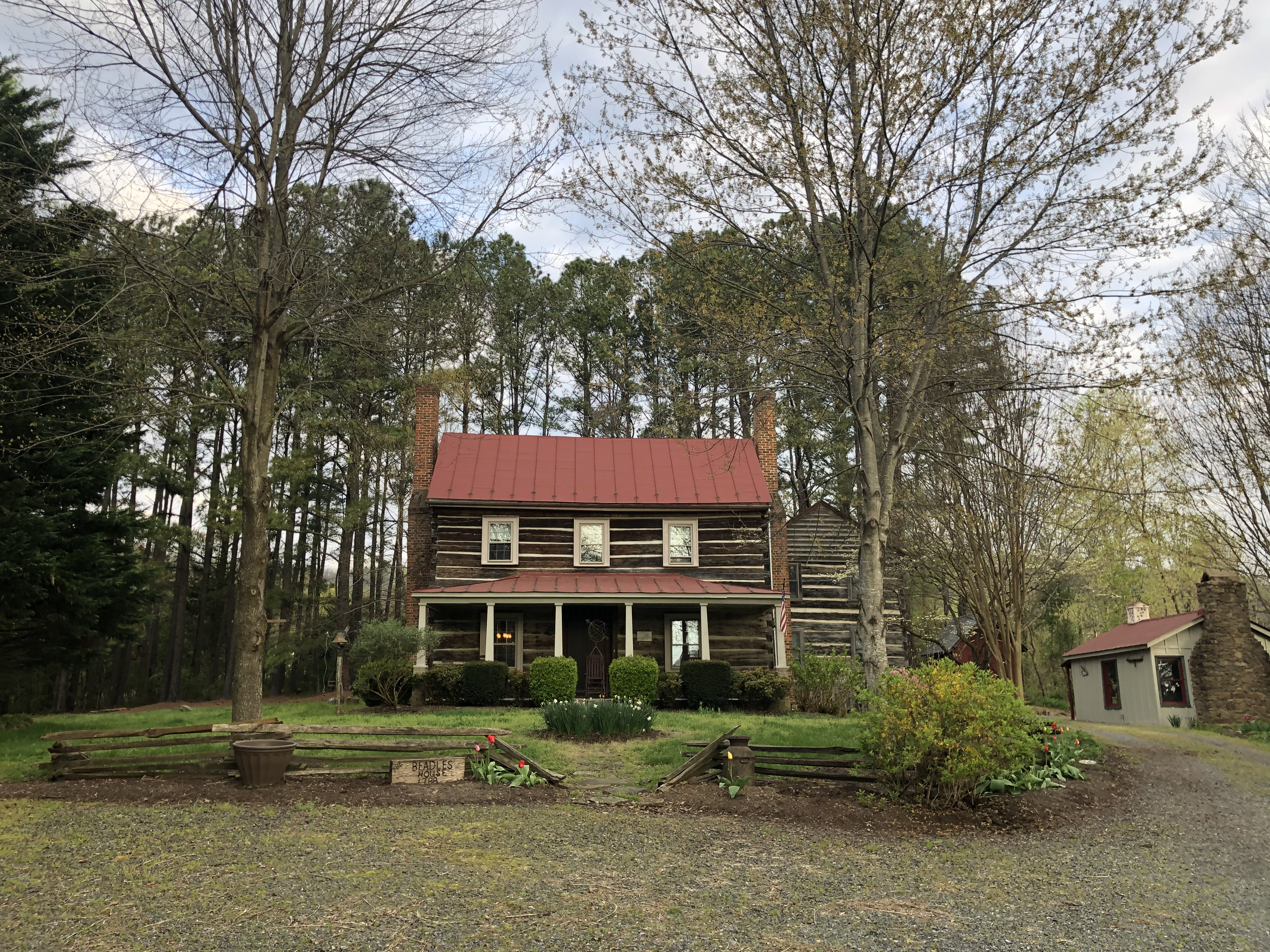
- Beadles House taken from the front, facing west

- Location within Virginia Location within the United States
- Area: 3.3 acres (1.3 ha)
- Built: 1789
- Architectural style: Georgian, Greek Revival
- NRHP reference No.: 00001433
- VLR No.: 039-5006

Significant dates
- Added to NRHP: November 22, 2000
- Designated VLR: 11/22/2000

The Beadles House is a historic house located in Stanardsville, Greene County, Virginia. It was built from 1788 to 1789 by Revolutionary War militia captain John Beadles. It is a two-story, chestnut and poplar log dwelling. It was listed on the National Register of Historic Places on November 22, 2000.

== History ==
The land on which the Beadles House stands was originally a part of the Octonia Grant in the early eighteenth century. In 1779 William Stanard owned the property, which passed through the ownership of Thomas and Pattey Streshly and later Mace and Sally Pickett. In 1788, Revolutionary war militia captain John Beadles acquired the 437 acres of land.

Tradition and architectural evidence suggest Beadles built his house shortly after his marriage to Lurania Miller (1788 or 1789). Beadles' estate in 1824 included sixteen slaves, a still, swine and other livestock, and stores of tobacco (2,700 pounds), corn, wheat, rye, oats, hay, flax, and hemp. John and Lurania had seven children, one of whom, William, inherited the home place. In 1839 William Beadles sold the house and 352 acres to James White who lived there with his wife Frances their children.

The 1850 federal census listed James White as a farmer owning $2,800 in real estate; the 1860 census listed him as a farmer owning $8,040 in real estate and $11,720 in personal estate. After James White's death the property passed to his wife and after her death to her grandchildren. A daughter, Virginia White (1848-1909), may have lived in the house until it was sold out of the family in 1900. After 1900 the property passed through several owners before being purchased by Tyree J. Sims in 1918. Sims had a frame wash-house with a stone chimney constructed around 1920, which contributes to the building's historic status.

In 1945 Sims transferred 228.5 acres including the house to his daughter Violet and her husband George Rhodes. The farm was sold out of the Sims/Rhodes family in 1957 and in 1970 the land was subdivided into residential lots. Dorothy Davis, a past mayor of Washington, Virginia, purchased the house in 1970.

The house and 3.265 acres were acquired in 1999 by Kenneth and Carol Weiss. They completely renovated the house from the foundation up, complying with requirements that enabled them to list the property as a landmark on the registries of the National and Virginia Historic Places. The Weisses added on another oak log house circa 1800, connecting it to the Beadles house with a large post and beam kitchen. It has since gone through significant improvements.

John Beadles is buried in a small family graveyard located just beyond the northwest boundary of the property. His grave, marked by a ca. 1930 marble headstone erected by the Daughters of the American Revolution, is accompanied by several fieldstone markers and the marble headstone of Virginia White who may have been the last person buried in the cemetery.

== Architecture ==
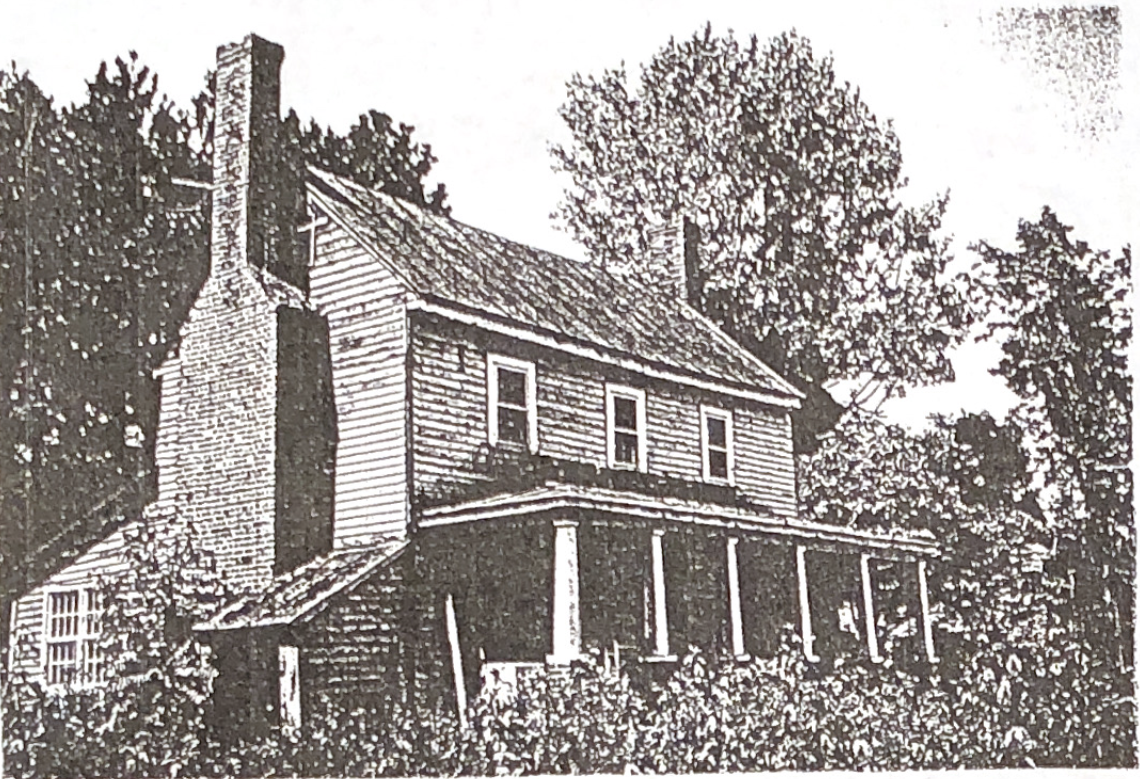
A picture taken of The Beadles House before restoration.

The Beadles House is representative of its time, and its construction is better most back-country Virginia houses of the same era. Its hall-parlor plan was common in most dwellings before the nineteenth century. The house's hand-hewn chestnut logs, finely crafted full-and half-dovetail notching, and two-story height set it apart from the crude log cabins of Virginia's mountain region. The little-altered second floor contains molded woodwork and hand-wrought hardware (including HL hinges) of the highest quality. Other important early features survive including Flemish and English-bond chimneys, board partitions, batten doors, beaded ceiling joists, a boxed winder stair, and Georgian and vernacular Greek Revival mantels. Since the interior walls have survived completely intact, they offer a rare opportunity to study late-eighteenth-century construction. Most of the glass in the windows, as well as the window frames, are original.

The Beadles House was the subject of a Green County Record newspaper article in 1973, which pictured the house in the 1930s. At the time, the house was connected to an exterior kitchen, which is now non-extant, by a small rear addition. During restoration in 2000, a circa 1805 oak log cabin of similar fashion was relocated from West Virginia for an addition on the north side of the dwelling. Originally covered by weatherboard siding, the well preserved American Chestnut logs were exposed.

The house has a metal-sheathed gable roof, a stone foundation, exterior gable-end brick chimneys, and a one-story Craftsman-style front porch. The interior features Georgian and Greek Revival architectural design elements.
