= Powell–McMullan House =

Historic house in Virginia, United States

- U.S. National Register of Historic Places
- Virginia Landmarks Register
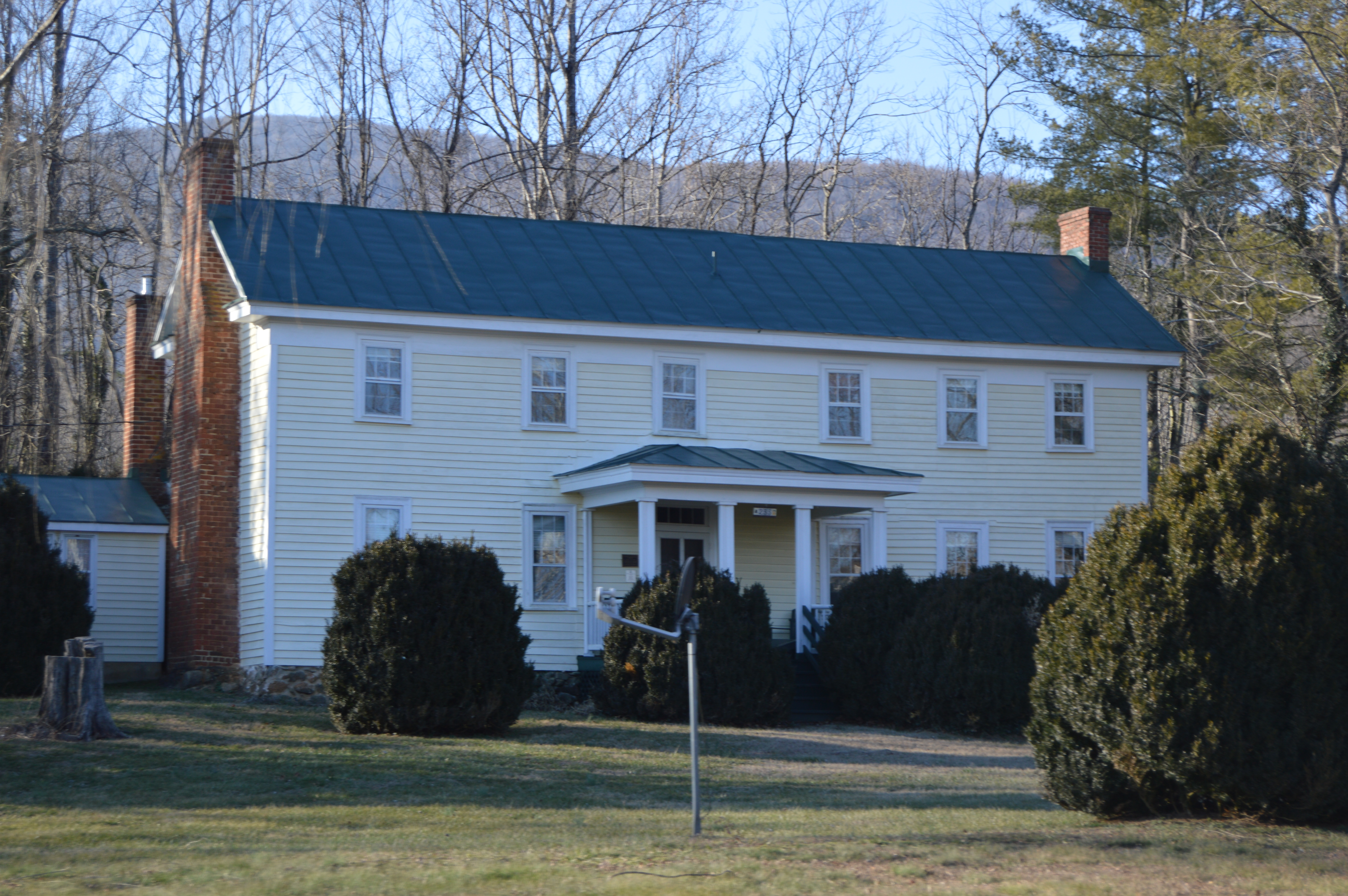
- Front of the house

- Location within Virginia Location within the United States
- Location: 233 McMullen Mill Rd., near Stanardsville, Virginia
- Coordinates: 38°20′57″N 78°27′29″W
- Area: 2.6 acres (1.1 ha)
- Built: c. 1800, 1842
- Architectural style: Greek Revival
- NRHP reference No.: 02001367
- VLR No.: 039-0034

Significant dates
- Added to NRHP: November 21, 2002
- Designated VLR: September 11, 2002

Powell–McMullan House is a historic home located near Stanardsville, Greene County, Virginia. The original house was built about 1800 and expanded in 1842. It is a two-story, frame dwelling in a vernacular Greek Revival style. It has a metal-sheathed gable roof, exterior gable-end brick chimneys, and a one-story hipped roof front porch.

It was listed on the National Register of Historic Places in 2000.
