= Caskie, Virginia =

Unincorporated community in Virginia, US

Coordinates: 37°32′23″N 78°49′48″W

Caskie is an unincorporated community in Nelson County, Virginia, United States.
