= Quinque, Virginia =

Unincorporated community in Virginia, United States

Quinque
- Unincorporated community
- Location in Virginia Quinque (the United States)
- Coordinates: 38°15′00″N 78°23′52″W
- Country: United States
- State: Virginia
- County: Greene County
- Elevation: 719 ft (219 m)
- ZIP code: 22965
- FIPS code: 51-65296
- GNIS feature ID: 1499928

Quinque is an unincorporated community in Greene County, Virginia, United States.

== Geography ==
The community is located two miles northwest of Ruckersville, on Route 33, the Spotswood Trail.

Location of Quinque within the Greene County

== Etymology ==
Quinque had its name bestowed by James Madison; it was his fifth (quinque is the number five in Latin) choice when looking to build his home in Virginia.
