= Ottoway, Virginia =

Unincorporated community in Virginia, US

Coordinates: 37°54′48″N 78°47′30″W

Ottoway is an unincorporated community in Nelson County, Virginia, United States.
