= Red Apple Orchard, Virginia =

Unincorporated community in Virginia, US

Coordinates: 37°42′15″N 78°46′44″W

Red Apple Orchard is an unincorporated community in Nelson County, Virginia, United States.
