= Shady Grove, Virginia =

Shady Grove
- Unincorporated community
- Location within the Commonwealth of Virginia Shady Grove (the United States)
- Coordinates: 38°15′30″N 78°35′45″W
- Country: United States
- State: Virginia
- County: Greene
- Time zone: UTC−5 (Eastern (EST))
  - Summer (DST): UTC−4 (EDT)

Shady Grove is an unincorporated community in Greene County, Virginia, United States.
