= McMullen, Virginia =

Unincorporated community in Virginia, United States

Coordinates: 38°20′54″N 78°27′28″W

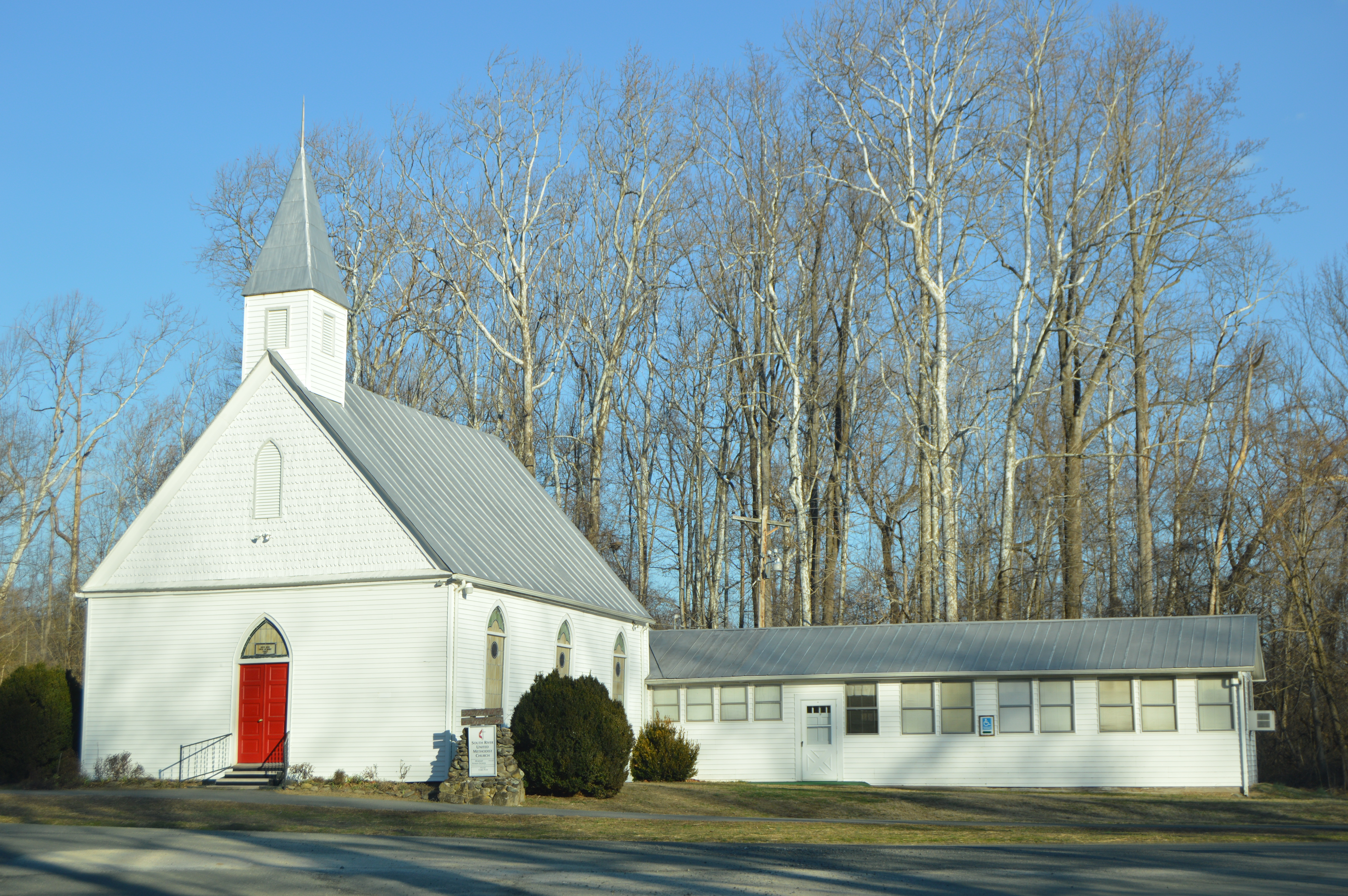
South River United Methodist Church

McMullen is an unincorporated community in Greene County, Virginia, United States.
