= Kingswood, Virginia =

Unincorporated community in Virginia, US

Coordinates: 37°41′12.5″N 78°56′47″W

Kingswood is an unincorporated community in Nelson County, Virginia, United States.

== Geography ==
According to Google Maps, Kingswood is located along Highway 29, positioned south of the city of Colleen and north of the city of Amherst. The Tye River flows through Kingswood.
