= Barnes, Virginia =

Unincorporated community in Virginia, United States

Coordinates: 38°13′15″N 78°26′54″W

Barnes is an unincorporated community in Greene County, Virginia, United States.
