= Twin Poplars, Virginia =

Unincorporated community in Virginia, US

Coordinates: 37°51′39″N 78°48′14″W

Twin Poplars is an unincorporated community in Nelson County, Virginia, United States.
