= Locust Grove (Castalian Springs, Tennessee) =

Historic house in Tennessee, United States

- U.S. National Register of Historic Places
- Location within Tennessee
- Nearest city: Castalian Springs, Tennessee
- Coordinates: 36°25′30″N 86°18′24″W
- Area: 1.5 acres (0.61 ha)
- Built: 1817
- Architectural style: Federal
- NRHP reference No.: 79002484
- Added to NRHP: January 8, 1979

Locust Grove is a historic house in Castalian Springs, Tennessee, U.S.. It was built in 1817 for Francis Weathered, a veteran of the American Revolutionary War and Baptist preacher. The house was designed in the Federal architectural style. It has been listed on the National Register of Historic Places since January 8, 1979.
