= Rockfish, Virginia =

Unincorporated community in Virginia, US

Coordinates: 37°48′05″N 78°45′20″W

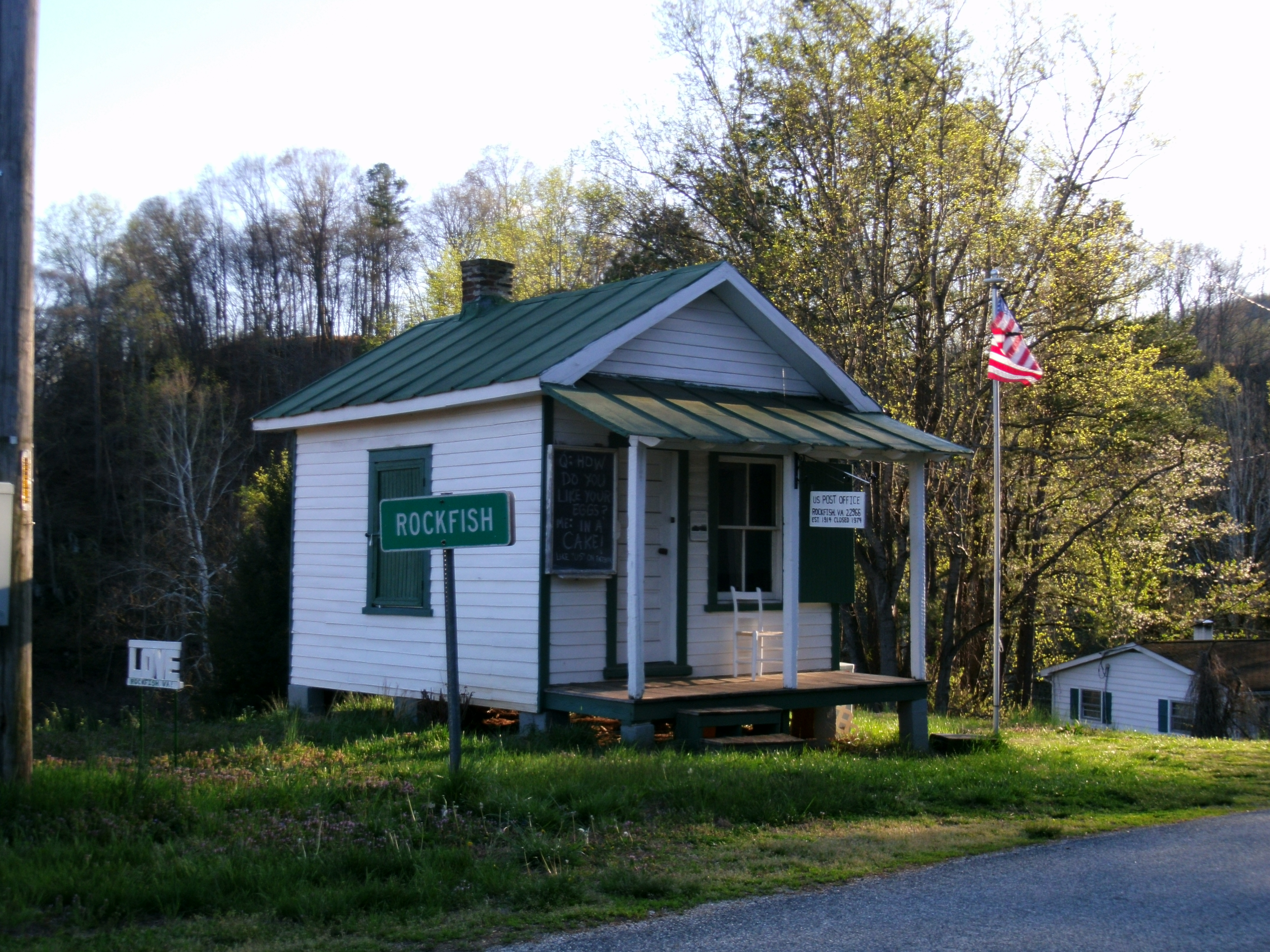
Rockfish Post Office in Rockfish, Virginia

Rockfish is an unincorporated community in Nelson County, Virginia, United States.

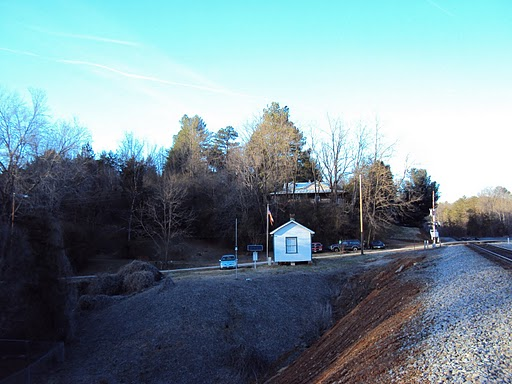
Looking North at the Old Rockfish Post Office and the intersection of Rt 617 and Norfolk Southern Railroad

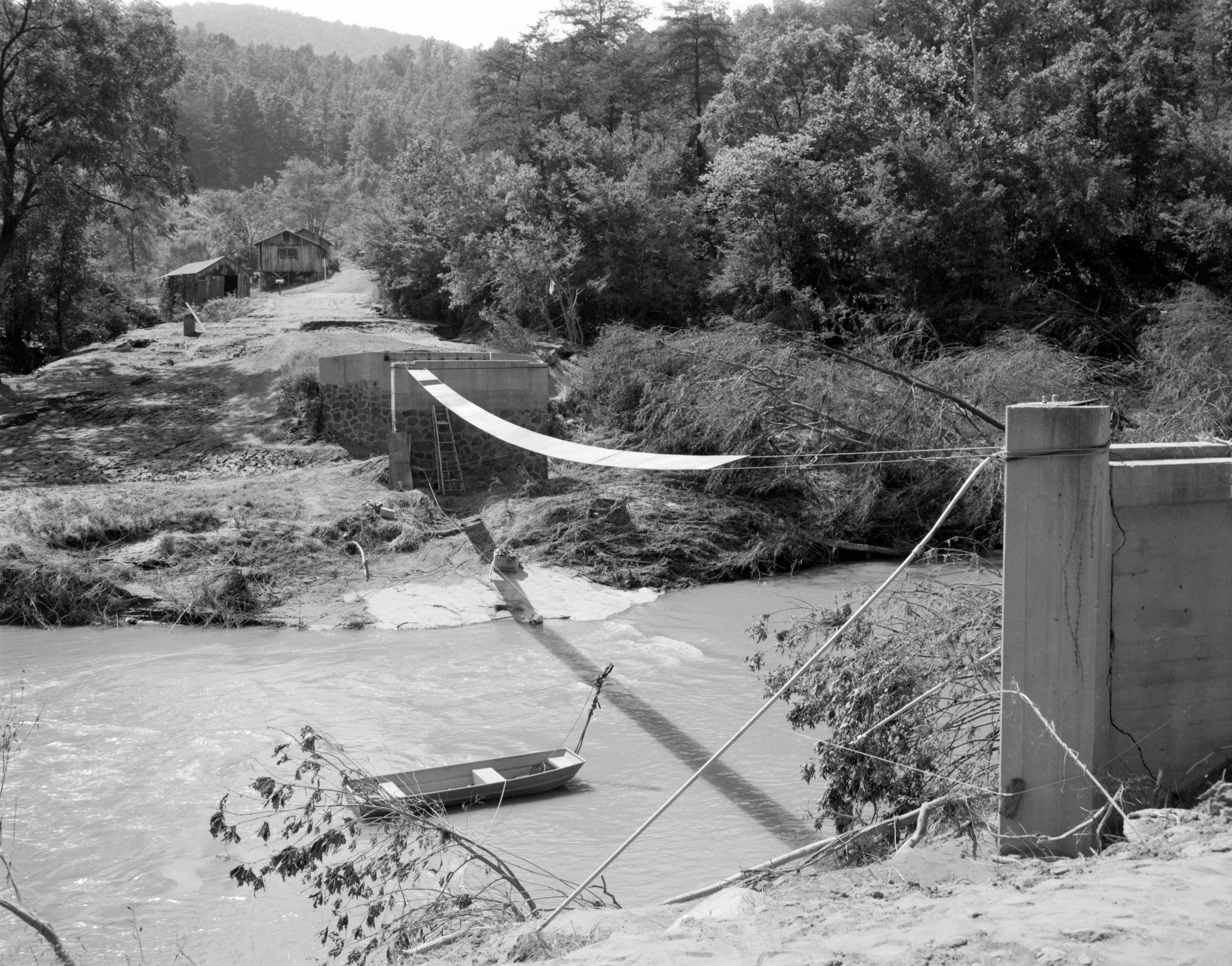
Flood damage in the Rockfish area after the passage of Hurricane Camille

== Overview ==
It was among the communities severely affected by flash flooding from Hurricane Camille in 1969.

Rockfish was frequently referenced in the CBS television series The Waltons as being the closest town to Waltons Mountain, the fictional version of the nearby community of Schuyler.

The community is also known as "Rockfish Depot" even though the railroad depot building has been gone for decades.

== Climate ==
The climate in this area is characterized by hot, humid summers and generally mild to cool winters. According to the Köppen Climate Classification system, Rockfish has a humid subtropical climate, abbreviated "Cfa" on climate maps.
