= Adial, Virginia =

Unincorporated community in Virginia, US

Coordinates: 37°51′54″N 78°49′49″W

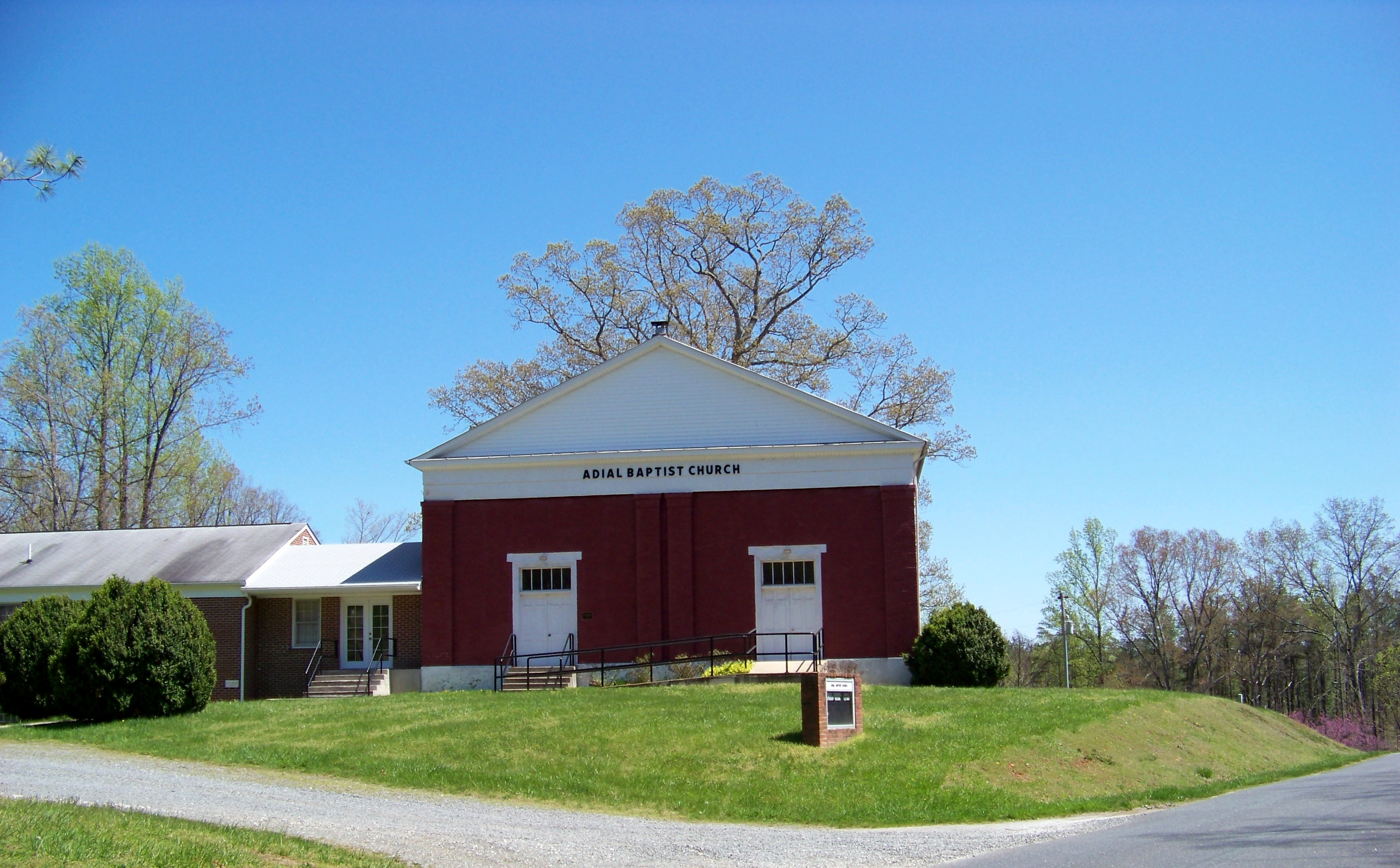
Adial Baptist Church

Adial is an unincorporated community in Nelson County, Virginia, United States.
