= Ramsey, Virginia =

Unincorporated community in Virginia, US

Coordinates: 37.8548616°N 78.9622464°W

Ramsey is an unincorporated community in Nelson County, Virginia, United States.
