= Simmons Gap, Virginia =

Unincorporated community in Virginia, United States

Coordinates: 38°17′48″N 78°37′19″W

Simmons Gap is an unincorporated community in Greene County, Virginia, United States.

Simmons Gap is named after Ephraim Seamonds/Simmons who lived at Simmons Gap in the Blue Ridge Mountains. Simmons Gap Road that runs from Buck Mountain Road just north of Earlysville to the park line and picks back up on the west side. In the horse and wagon days, Simmons Gap was one of the main mountain crossings. Ephriam Seamonds and his wife Mary Pew Seamonds are buried on the mountain. When it was decided to cut a better crossing, the Spotswood Trail was selected, which is now Route 33. Simmons Gap sits between Weaver and Flattop Mountains.
