= Geer, Virginia =

Unincorporated community in Virginia, United States

Coordinates: 38°17′53″N 78°29′55″W

Geer is an unincorporated community in Greene County, Virginia, United States.
