= Lydia, Virginia =

Unincorporated community in Virginia, United States

Coordinates: 38°19′49″N 78°29′27″W

Lydia is an unincorporated community in Greene County, Virginia, United States.
