= Old Myndus, Virginia =

Unincorporated community in Virginia, US

Coordinates: 37°49′18″N 78°51′17″W

Old Myndus is an unincorporated community in Nelson County, Virginia, United States.

Myndus is at the head of Davis Creek on US Route 29.

It is predominantly a small farming community at the confluence of Route 29 and VA Route 623, four miles north of Lovingston. There was once a two-lane highway between the post office and general store.

Most businesses are now closed. The old sawmill is currently used for hay storage and the old peach packing shed is now a workshop. All the farmland is currently in hay.
