= Allens Creek, Virginia =

Unincorporated community in Virginia, US

Coordinates: 37°32′49″N 78°52′07″W

Allens Creek is an unincorporated community in Nelson County, Virginia, United States.
