= Elma, Virginia =

Unincorporated community in Virginia, US

Coordinates: 37°45′14″N 78°47′42″W

Elma is an unincorporated community in Nelson County, Virginia, United States.
