= Bryant, Virginia =

Unincorporated community in Virginia, US

Coordinates: 37°48′04″N 78°57′23″W

Bryant is an unincorporated community in Nelson County, Virginia, United States. It was among the communities severely affected by flash flooding from Hurricane Camille in 1969.

The Bryant family remains strong in the community. Descendants, who trace their roots to the Massie family, occupy much of the area.
