= Locust Grove (La Plata, Maryland) =

Historic house in Maryland, United States

- U.S. National Register of Historic Places
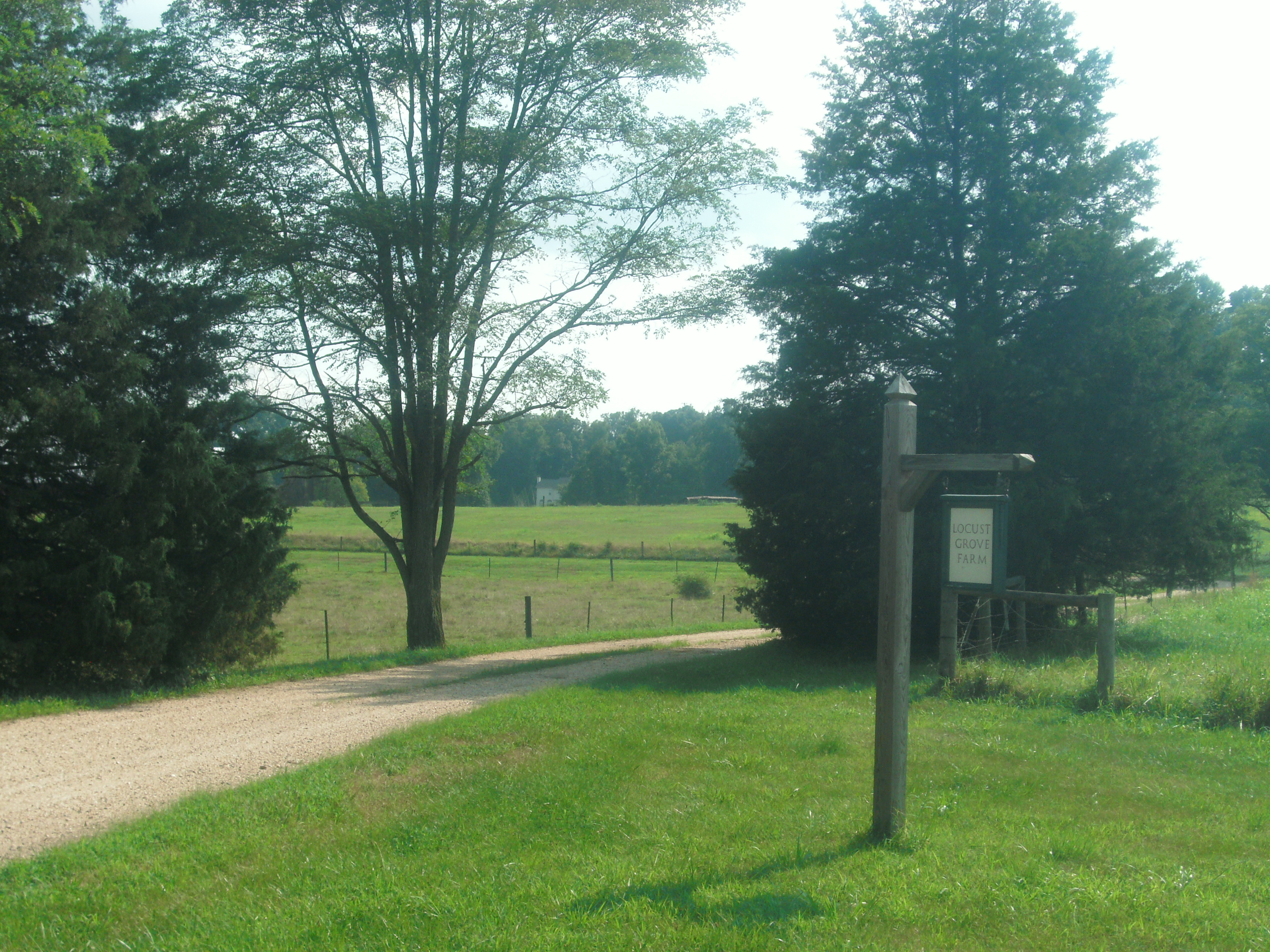

- Location within Maryland Location within the United States
- Nearest city: La Plata, Maryland
- Coordinates: 38°32′32″N 77°1′22″W
- Built: 1825
- Architectural style: Federal
- NRHP reference No.: 78001454
- Added to NRHP: July 21, 1978

Locust Grove, also known as Beech Neck, is a historic home located at La Plata, Charles County, Maryland, United States. It is a two-story, three bay Federal style frame house, with a fine view of the Port Tobacco Valley. The original section of the house was built prior to 1750, with a significant expansion occurring about 1825.

Locust Grove was listed on the National Register of Historic Places in 1998.
