= Nash, Virginia =

Unincorporated community in Virginia, US

Coordinates: 37°51′27″N 79°02′46″W

Nash is an unincorporated community in Nelson County, Virginia, United States.
