= Poplar Flats, Virginia =

Unincorporated community in Virginia, US

Coordinates: 37°44′51″N 78°55′31″W

Poplar Flats is an unincorporated community in Nelson County, Virginia, United States.
