= Freshwater, Virginia =

Unincorporated community in Virginia, US

Coordinates: 37°45′02″N 78°55′37″W

Freshwater is an unincorporated community in Nelson County, Virginia, United States.
