= Pirkey, Virginia =

Unincorporated community in Virginia, United States

Coordinates: 38°16′25″N 78°33′15″W

Pirkey is an unincorporated community in Greene County, Virginia, United States.
