= Upper Pocosin, Virginia =

Unincorporated community in Virginia, United States

Coordinates: 38°24′03″N 78°28′55″W

Upper Pocosin is an unincorporated community in Greene County, Virginia, United States.
