= Hendersons Store, Virginia =

Unincorporated community in Virginia, US

Coordinates: 37°44′36″N 78°59′55″W

Hendersons Store is an unincorporated community in Nelson County, Virginia, United States.
