= Haneytown, Virginia =

Unincorporated community in Virginia, United States

Coordinates: 38°17′25″N 78°32′07″W

Haneytown is an unincorporated community in Greene County, Virginia, United States.
