= Stanardsville, Virginia =

Stanardsville
- Town
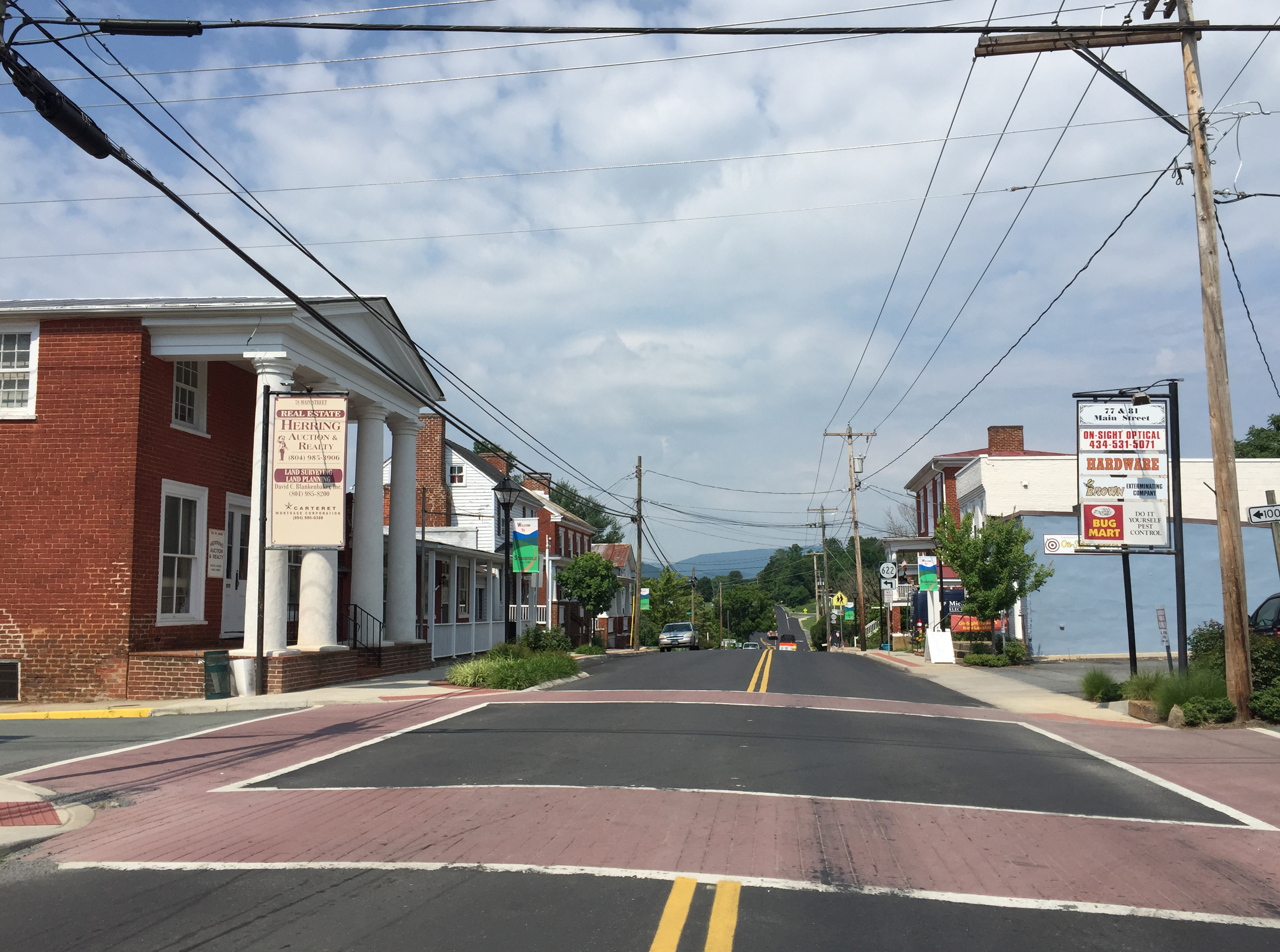
- Central Stanardsville

- Seal

- Karte Location of Stanardsville within the Greene County

- Location in Virginia Stanardsville (the United States)
- Coordinates: 38°17′49″N 78°26′22″W
- Country: United States
- State: Virginia
- County: Greene

Government
  - Mayor: Gary Ernest Lowe

Area
  - Total: 0.36 sq mi (0.93 km^{2})
  - Land: 0.36 sq mi (0.93 km^{2})
  - Water: 0 sq mi (0.00 km^{2})
- Elevation: 663 ft (202 m)

Population (2020)
  - Total: 349
  - Estimate (2019): 386
  - Density: 1,080.3/sq mi (417.11/km^{2})
- Time zone: UTC−5 (Eastern (EST))
  - Summer (DST): UTC−4 (EDT)
- ZIP code: 22973
- Area code: 434
- FIPS code: 51-75008
- GNIS feature ID: 1500151
- Website: www.stanardsville.org

Stanardsville is a town in Greene County, Virginia, United States. The population was 349 at the 2020 census, down from 367 at the 2010 census. It is the county seat of Greene County. The name is from Robert Stanard, a benefactor who donated land for public use. It is part of the Charlottesville, Virginia metropolitan area.

== History ==
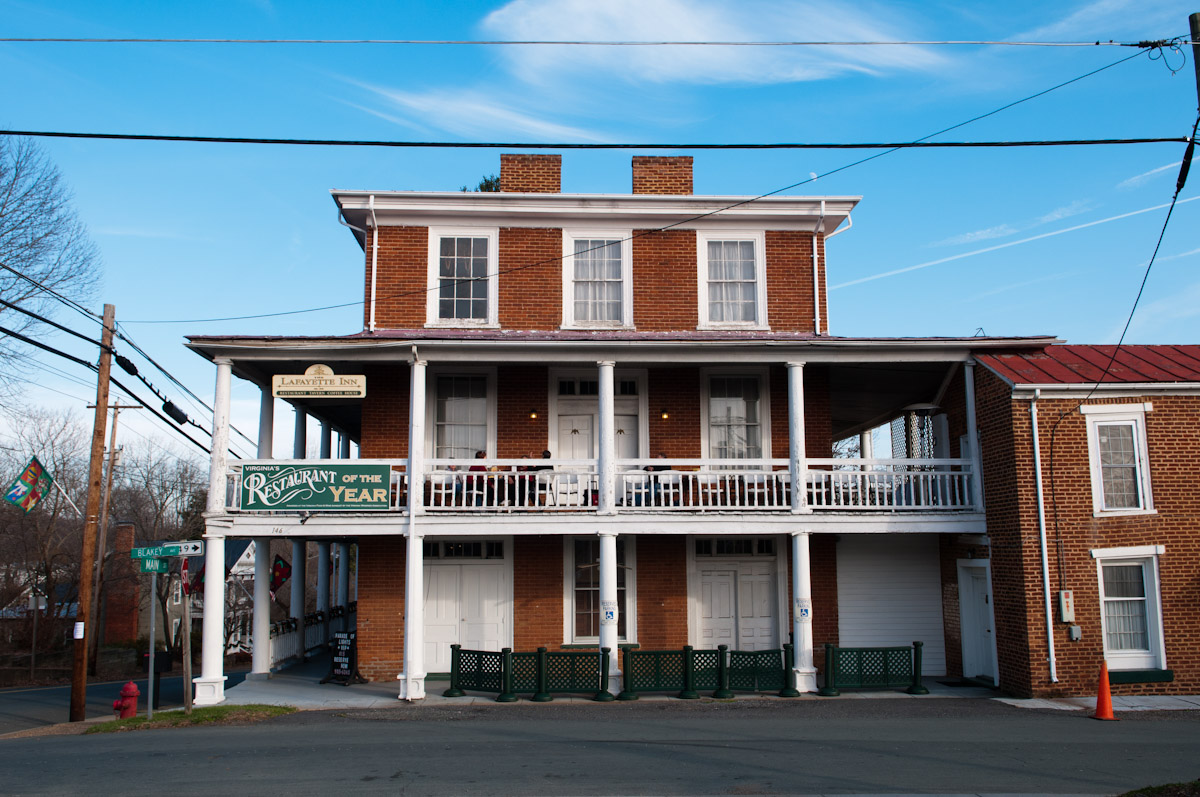
Lafayette Inn, historical landmark on Main St.

Stanardsville is named for the Stanard family, landholders who surveyed the first lots for the town in 1794. In 1838, Greene County was created from land previously contained within Orange County and Stanardsville was selected as the county seat.

The Greene County Courthouse, Beadles House, Octonia Stone, Powell–McMullan House, and Stanardsville Historic District are listed on the National Register of Historic Places.

== Geography ==
Stanardsville is located in central Greene County at 38°17′49″N 78°26′22″W (38.296852, -78.439367), at the eastern foot of the Blue Ridge Mountains.

According to the United States Census Bureau, Stanardsville has a total area of 0.3 square miles (0.9 km^{2}), all land.

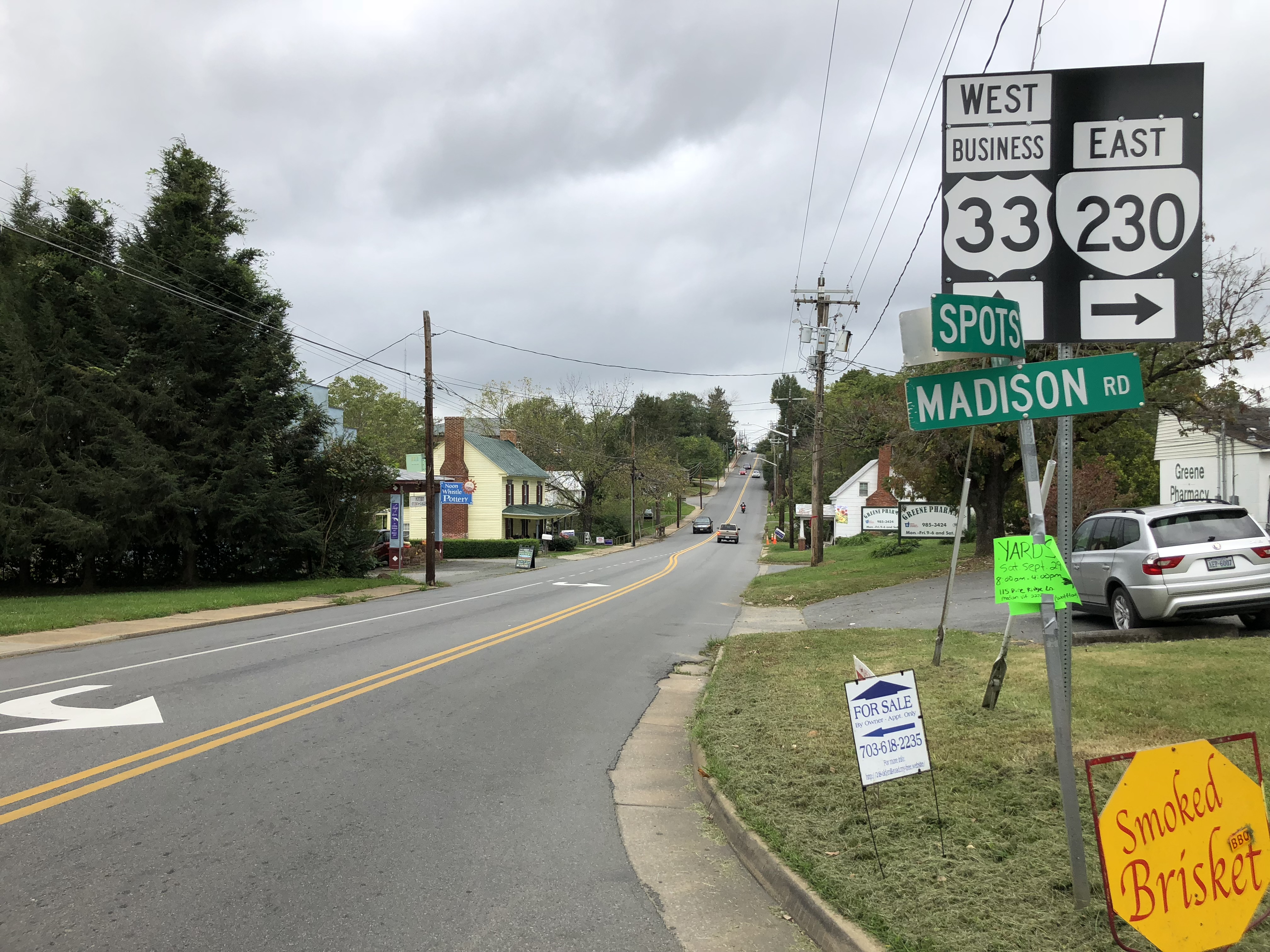
View west along US 33 Bus at SR 230 in Stanardsville

== Transportation ==
The main highways directly serving Stanardsville are U.S. Route 33 Business and Virginia State Route 230. US 33 Bus is the old alignment of U.S. Route 33, which now bypasses the town just to the south. US 33 extends eastward to Richmond and westward to Skyline Drive and beyond to Harrisonburg. SR 230 extends northeast, providing connections to Madison and beyond to Washington, D.C. via U.S. Route 29.

== Demographics ==
Historical population
Census	Pop.	Note	%±
1930	229		—
1940	212		−7.4%
1950	182		−14.2%
1960	283		55.5%
1970	296		4.6%
1980	284		−4.1%
1990	257		−9.5%
2000	476		85.2%
2010	367		−22.9%
2020	349		−4.9%
U.S. Decennial Census

As of the census of 2000, there were 476 people, 183 households, and 116 families residing in the town. The population density was 1,361.0 people per square mile (525.1/km^{2}). There were 196 housing units at an average density of 560.4 per square mile (216.2/km^{2}). The racial makeup of the town was 88.87% White, 8.61% African American, 0.21% Native American, 1.05% from other races, and 1.26% from two or more races. Hispanic or Latino of any race were 0.84% of the population.

There were 183 households, out of which 31.1% had children under the age of 18 living with them, 34.4% were married couples living together, 21.9% had a female householder with no husband present, and 36.6% were non-families. 34.4% of all households were made up of individuals, and 14.2% had someone living alone who was 65 years of age or older. The average household size was 2.21 and the average family size was 2.73.

In the town, the population was spread out, with 23.3% under the age of 18, 6.9% from 18 to 24, 22.5% from 25 to 44, 17.9% from 45 to 64, and 29.4% who were 65 years of age or older. The median age was 41 years. For every 100 females there were 74.4 males. For every 100 females aged 18 and over, there were 65.2 males.

The median income for a household in the town was $24,643, and the median income for a family was $33,750. Males had a median income of $24,583 versus $18,889 for females. The per capita income for the town was $21,317. About 14.3% of families and 15.1% of the population were below the poverty line, including 24.5% of those under age 18 and 11.4% of those age 65 or over.

== Education ==
The Greene County Public Schools includes the William Monroe High School.
