= Williams Fork, Virginia =

Unincorporated community in Virginia, United States

Coordinates: 38°16′12″N 78°30′59″W

Williams Fork is an unincorporated community in Greene County, Virginia, United States.
