= Lakeview Heights, Virginia =

Unincorporated community in Virginia, US

Coordinates: 37°44′34.5″N 78°52′9″W

Lakeview Heights is an unincorporated community in Nelson County, Virginia, United States.
