= Dawsonville, Kenya =

Railway town and junction in Kenya

Coordinates: 00°17′00″S 36°03′00″E

Dawsonville is a railway town and junction in Kenya, lying on the main line to Uganda and the branches to Kisumu and Solai.

== See also ==
- Railway stations in Kenya

== Statistics ==
- Elevation = 1984m
- Population = 49,675
