= Gordon Crossing, Virginia =

Unincorporated community in Virginia, US

Coordinates: 37°44′25″N 78°49′01″W

Gordon Crossing is an unincorporated community in Nelson County, Virginia, United States.
