= Piedmont, Nelson County, Virginia =

Unincorporated community in Virginia, United States

Coordinates: 37°36′40″N 78°55′18″W

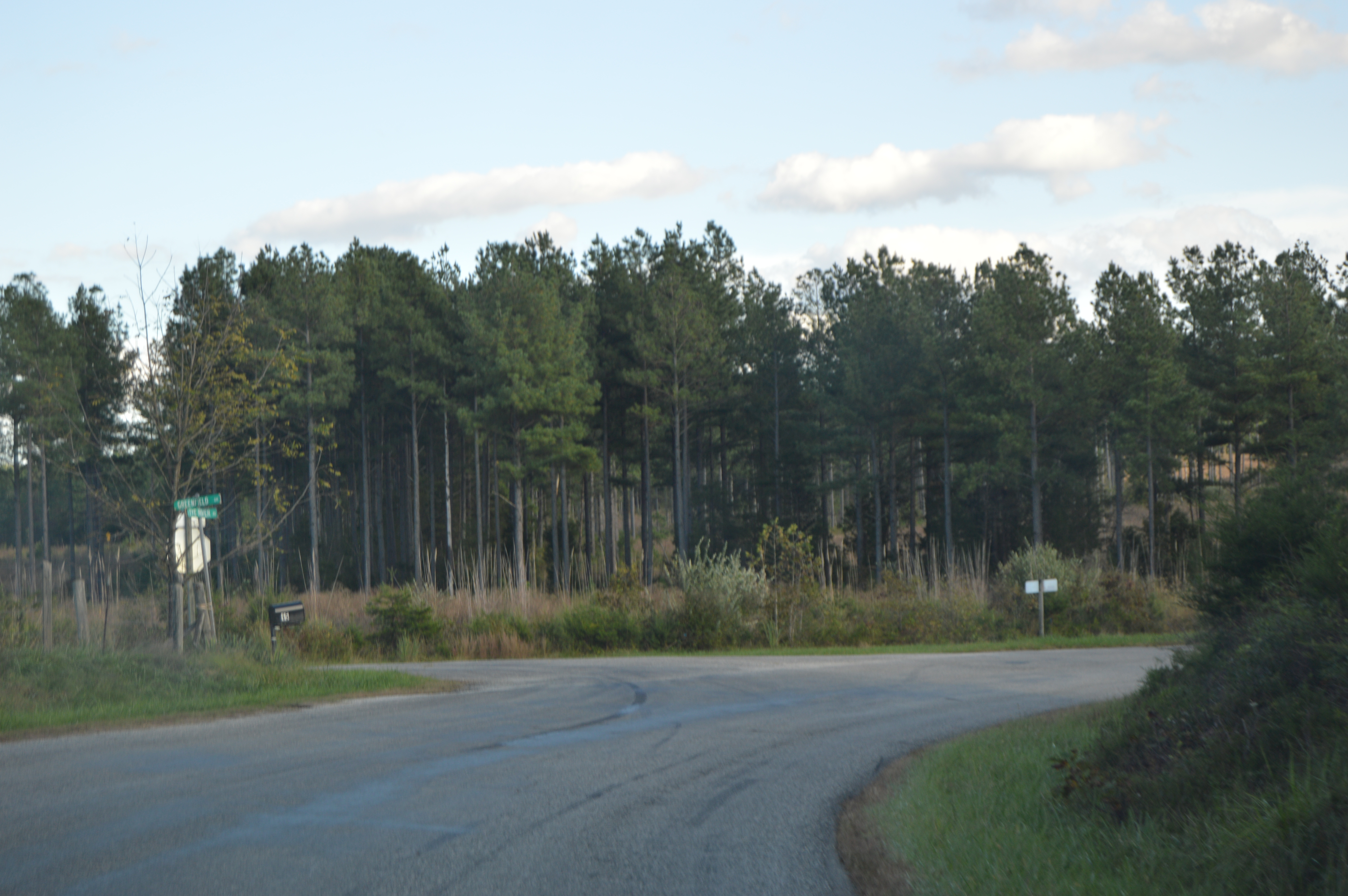
Overview of the site

Piedmont is an unincorporated community in Nelson County, Virginia, United States.
