= Lodebar, Virginia =

Unincorporated community in Virginia, US

Coordinates: 37°54′14″N 78°50′56″W

Lodebar is an unincorporated community in Nelson County, Virginia, United States.
