= White Rock, Virginia =

Unincorporated community in Virginia, US

Coordinates: 37°53′25″N 79°03′38″W

White Rock is an unincorporated community in Nelson County, Virginia, United States.
