= Gullysville, Virginia =

Unincorporated community in Virginia, US

Coordinates: 37°51′48″N 78°52′04″W

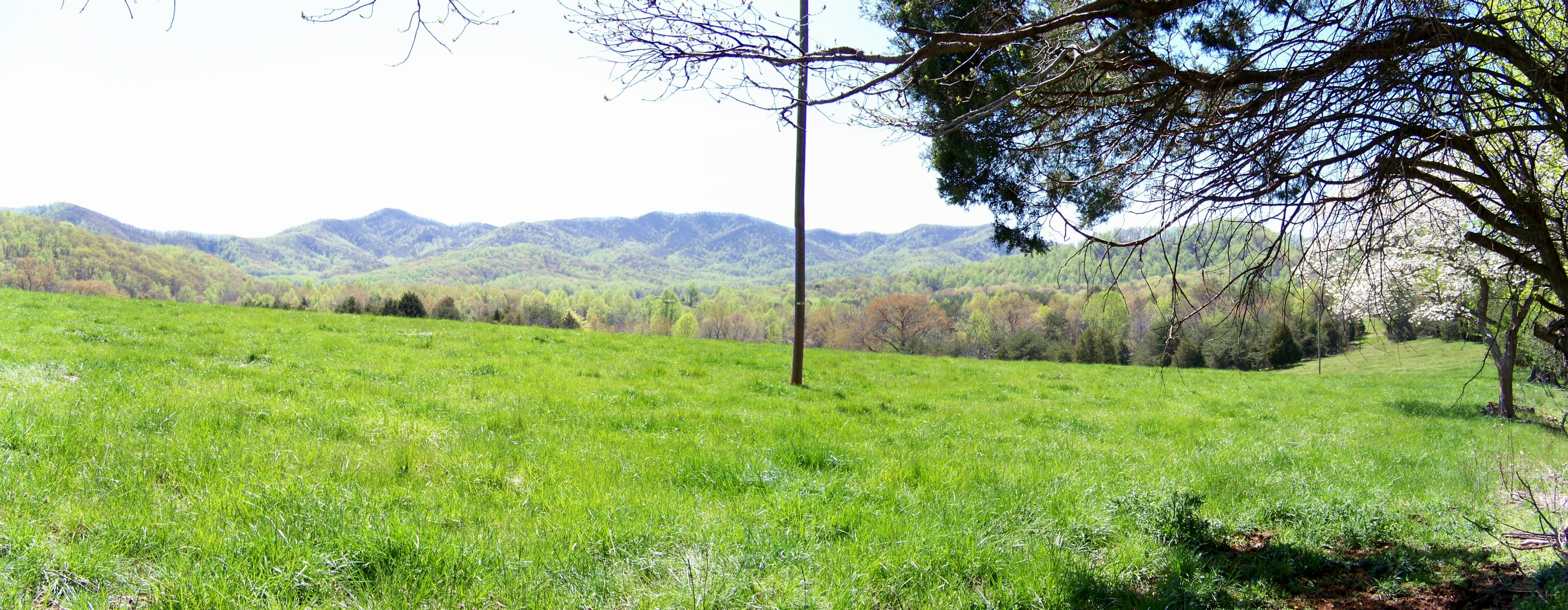
Landscape between Gullysville and Adial

Gullysville is an unincorporated community in Nelson County, Virginia, United States.
