= Greene County Courthouse (Virginia) =

Historic courthouse in Virginia, US

- U.S. National Register of Historic Places
- U.S. Historic district – Contributing property
- Virginia Landmarks Register
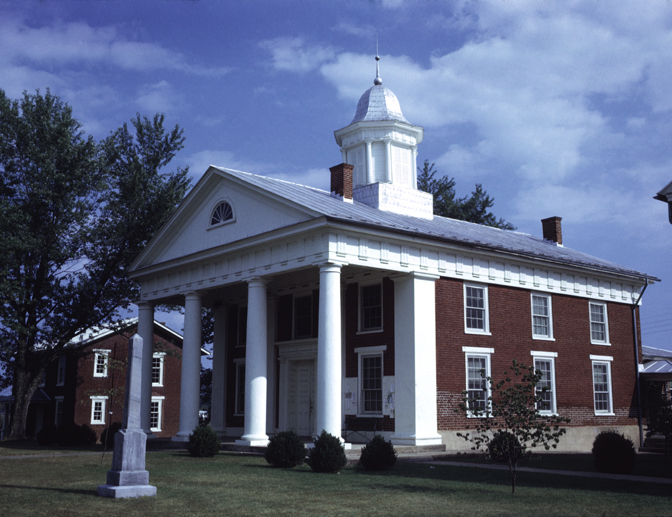
- Greene County Courthouse, February 1999

- Location within Virginia Location within the United States
- Interactive map showing the location of Greene County Courthouse
- Location: S of jct. of U.S. 33 and VA 649, Stanardsville, Virginia
- Coordinates: 38°17′46″N 78°26′22″W
- Area: 9.9 acres (4.0 ha)
- Built: 1838-1839, 1927-1928
- Architect: Phillips, William B.
- NRHP reference No.: 70000799
- VLR No.: 302-0001

Significant dates
- Added to NRHP: February 26, 1970
- Designated VLR: December 2, 1969

Greene County Courthouse is a historic county courthouse located at Stanardsville, Greene County, Virginia. It was built in 1838–1839, and is a two-story, gable roofed brick building. The front facade features a three-bay, pedimented tetrastyle portico addition using Tuscan order columns and a Roman Doric entablature added in 1927–1928. The building is topped by a distinctive cupola.

It was listed on the National Register of Historic Places in 1970.
