= Greenway, Nelson County, Virginia =

Unincorporated community in Virginia, US

Coordinates: 37°35′04″N 78°50′01″W

Greenway is an unincorporated community in Nelson County in the U.S. state of Virginia located 90 miles (140 km) west of the state capital, Richmond.
