= Four Forks, Virginia =

Unincorporated community in Virginia, United States

Coordinates: 37°34′56″N 78°50′40″W

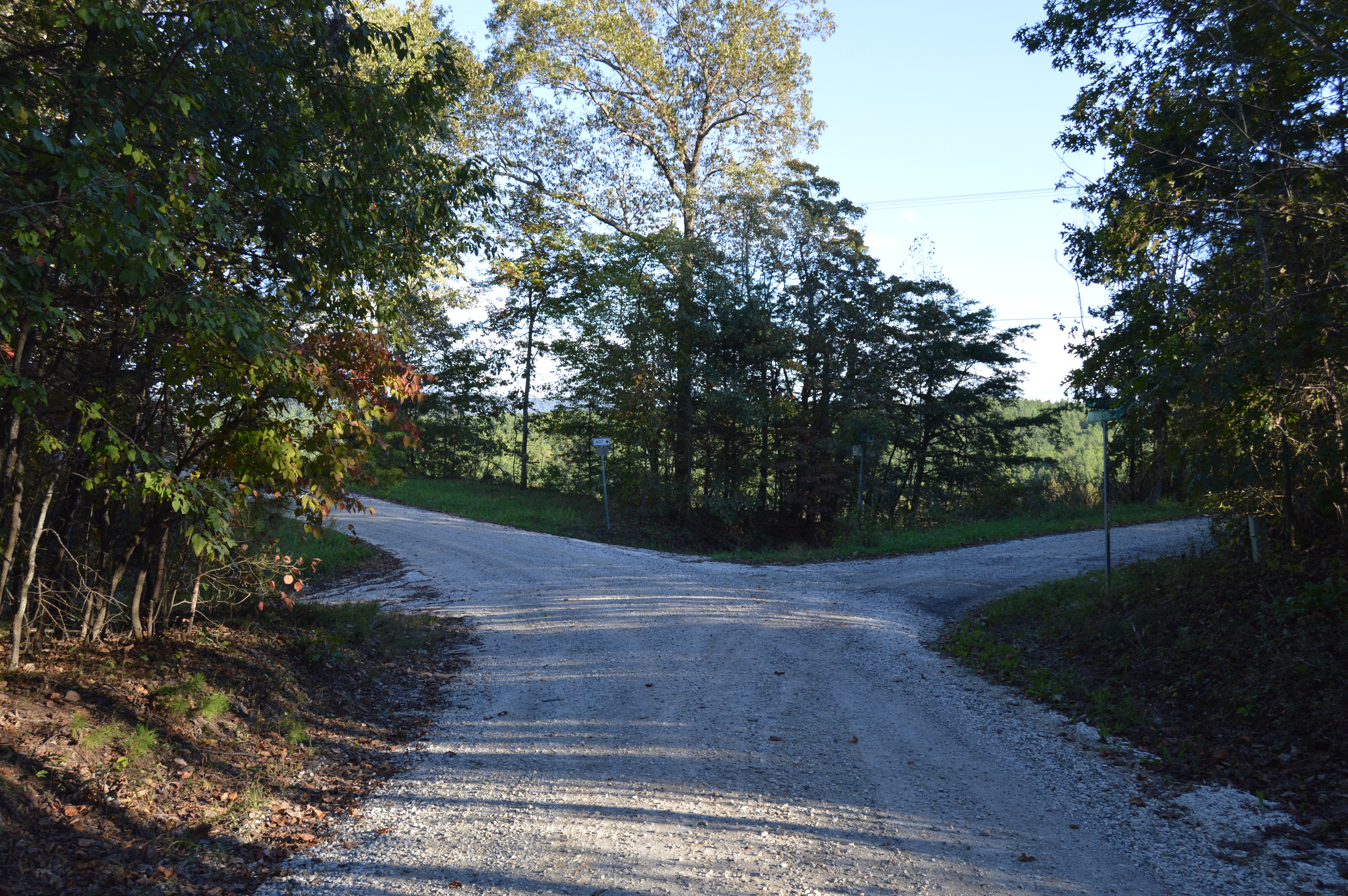
Overview of the site

Four Forks is an unincorporated community in Nelson County, Virginia, United States.
