= Greenfield, Nelson County, Virginia =

Unincorporated community in Virginia, US

Coordinates: 37°55′40″N 78°50′17″W

Greenfield is an unincorporated community in Nelson County, Virginia, United States.
