= Onan, Virginia =

Unincorporated community in Virginia, US

Onan
- Coordinates: 37°59′18″N 78°49′27″W
- Country: USA
- State: Virginia
- County: Nelson

Onan is an unincorporated community in Nelson County, Virginia, United States.
