= Durrett Town, Virginia =

Unincorporated community in Virginia, US

Coordinates: 37°59′00″N 78°48′29″W

Durrett Town is an unincorporated community in Nelson County, Virginia, United States.
