= Dawsonville, Virginia =

Unincorporated community in Virginia, United States

Coordinates: 38°15′55″N 78°18′54″W

Dawsonville is an unincorporated community in Greene County, Virginia, United States.
