= Amicus, Virginia =

Unincorporated community in Virginia, United States

Coordinates: 38°15′20″N 78°28′48″W

Amicus is an unincorporated community in Greene County, Virginia, United States. Amīcus is the Latin word for 'friend'.
