= Greene County, Virginia =

County in Virginia, United States

- County
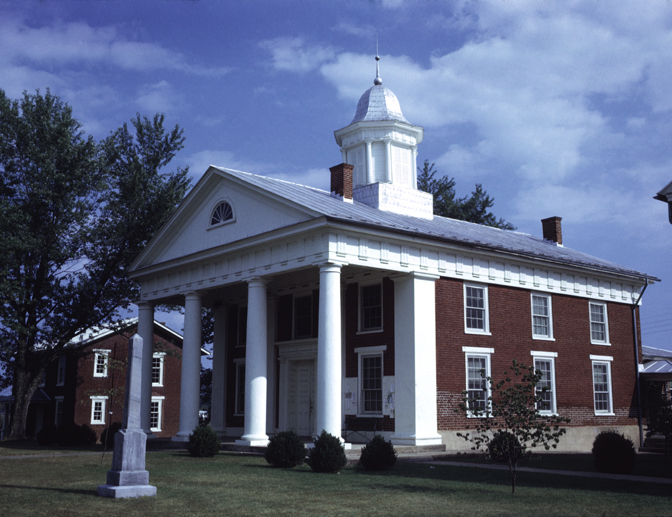
- Courthouse, built 1838, in Stanardsville

- Seal

- Location within the U.S. state of Virginia
- Coordinates: 38°18′N 78°28′W
- Country: United States
- State: Virginia
- Founded: 1838
- Named for: Nathanael Greene
- Seat: Stanardsville
- Largest community: Twin Lakes

Area
  - Total: 157 sq mi (410 km^{2})
  - Land: 156 sq mi (400 km^{2})
  - Water: 0.7 sq mi (1.8 km^{2}) 0.4%

Population (2020)
  - Total: 20,552
  - Estimate (2025): 21,958 ▲
  - Density: 132/sq mi (50.9/km^{2})
- Time zone: UTC−5 (Eastern)
  - Summer (DST): UTC−4 (EDT)
- Congressional district: 7th
- Website: www.greenecountyva.gov

Greene County is a county in Virginia in the eastern United States. As of the 2020 census, the population was 20,552. Its county seat is Stanardsville.

Greene County is part of the Charlottesville, VA Metropolitan Statistical Area.

In recent years, Greene County has become a tourist destination for metropolitan areas to escape to the Shenandoah National Park and Virginia's scenic foothills.

== History ==
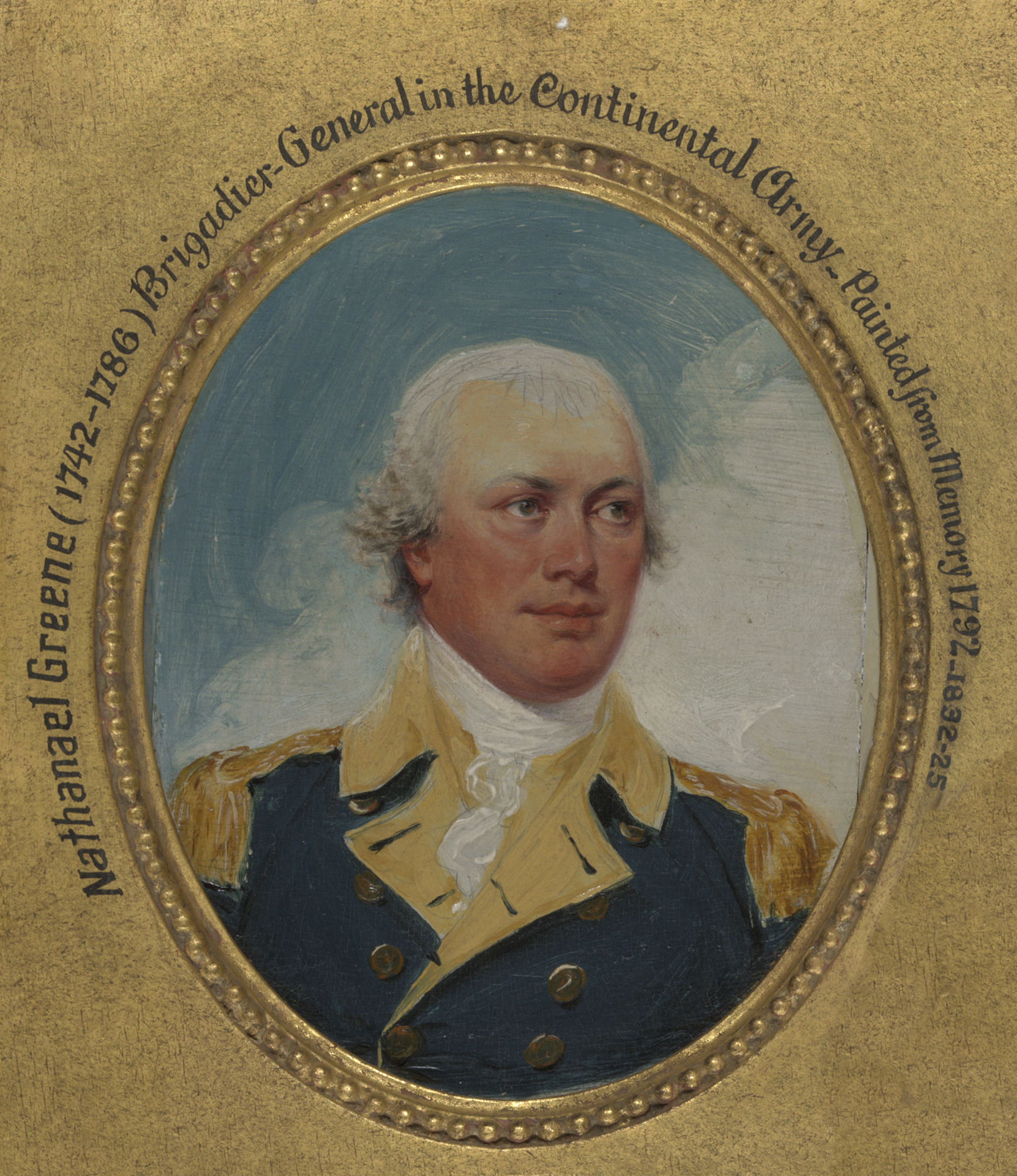
Nathanael Greene, for whom the county was named.

Greene County was established in 1838 from Orange County. The county is named for American Revolutionary War hero Nathanael Greene (1742–1786), who was a general in the Continental Army.

A major incident occurred on October 24, 1979, when a natural gas main ruptured, causing an explosion. The resulting fire destroyed the bell tower of the county courthouse and county office building. However, quick action by the firefighters on the scene saved the county records secured in the vault.

== Geography ==
According to the U.S. Census Bureau, the county has a total area of 156.8 square miles (406.1 km^{2}), of which 156.1 square miles (404.3 km^{2}) is land and 0.7 square miles (1.8 km^{2}) (0.4%) is water. It is the second-smallest county in Virginia by total area.

=== Adjacent counties ===
- Rockingham County – west
- Page County – northwest
- Madison County – northeast
- Orange County – southeast
- Albemarle County – south

=== National protected areas ===
- Shenandoah National Park (part)

=== Major highways ===
- US 29
- US 33
- SR 230

== Demographics ==
Historical population
| Census | Pop. | Note | %± |
|---|---|---|---|
| 1840 | 4,232 | | — |
| 1850 | 4,400 | | 4.0% |
| 1860 | 5,022 | | 14.1% |
| 1870 | 4,634 | | −7.7% |
| 1880 | 5,830 | | 25.8% |
| 1890 | 5,622 | | −3.6% |
| 1900 | 6,214 | | 10.5% |
| 1910 | 6,937 | | 11.6% |
| 1920 | 6,369 | | −8.2% |
| 1930 | 5,980 | | −6.1% |
| 1940 | 5,218 | | −12.7% |
| 1950 | 4,745 | | −9.1% |
| 1960 | 4,715 | | −0.6% |
| 1970 | 5,248 | | 11.3% |
| 1980 | 7,625 | | 45.3% |
| 1990 | 10,297 | | 35.0% |
| 2000 | 15,244 | | 48.0% |
| 2010 | 18,403 | | 20.7% |
| 2020 | 20,552 | | 11.7% |
| 2025 (est.) | 21,958 | ▲ | 6.8% |
U.S. Decennial Census; 1790–1960 1900–1990; 1990–2000 2010 2020

=== Racial and ethnic composition ===
Greene County, Virginia – Racial and ethnic composition Note: the US Census treats Hispanic/Latino as an ethnic category. This table excludes Latinos from the racial categories and assigns them to a separate category. Hispanics/Latinos may be of any race.
| Race / Ethnicity (NH = Non-Hispanic) | Pop 1980 | Pop 1990 | Pop 2000 | Pop 2010 | Pop 2020 | % 1980 | % 1990 | % 2000 | % 2010 | % 2020 |
|---|---|---|---|---|---|---|---|---|---|---|
| White alone (NH) | 6,998 | 9,536 | 13,769 | 15,785 | 16,214 | 91.78% | 92.61% | 90.32% | 85.77% | 78.89% |
| Black or African American alone (NH) | 546 | 664 | 982 | 1,160 | 1,442 | 7.16% | 6.45% | 6.44% | 6.30% | 7.02% |
| Native American or Alaska Native alone (NH) | 5 | 13 | 26 | 38 | 26 | 0.07% | 0.13% | 0.17% | 0.21% | 0.13% |
| Asian alone (NH) | 10 | 26 | 65 | 247 | 456 | 0.13% | 0.25% | 0.43% | 1.34% | 2.22% |
| Native Hawaiian or Pacific Islander alone (NH) | x | x | 1 | 2 | 4 | x | x | 0.01% | 0.01% | 0.02% |
| Other race alone (NH) | 8 | 5 | 27 | 46 | 92 | 0.10% | 0.05% | 0.18% | 0.25% | 0.45% |
| Mixed race or Multiracial (NH) | x | x | 173 | 344 | 988 | x | x | 1.13% | 1.87% | 4.81% |
| Hispanic or Latino (any race) | 58 | 53 | 201 | 781 | 1,330 | 0.76% | 0.51% | 1.32% | 4.24% | 6.47% |
| Total | 7,625 | 10,297 | 15,244 | 18,403 | 20,552 | 100.00% | 100.00% | 100.00% | 100.00% | 100.00% |

=== 2020 census ===
As of the 2020 census, the county had a population of 20,552. The median age was 41.4 years. 22.7% of residents were under the age of 18 and 18.3% of residents were 65 years of age or older. For every 100 females there were 95.2 males, and for every 100 females age 18 and over there were 93.6 males age 18 and over.

The racial makeup of the county was 80.4% White, 7.0% Black or African American, 0.2% American Indian and Alaska Native, 2.2% Asian, 0.0% Native Hawaiian and Pacific Islander, 3.4% from some other race, and 6.8% from two or more races. Hispanic or Latino residents of any race comprised 6.5% of the population.

0.0% of residents lived in urban areas, while 100.0% lived in rural areas.

There were 7,760 households in the county, of which 31.9% had children under the age of 18 living with them and 22.8% had a female householder with no spouse or partner present. About 22.1% of all households were made up of individuals and 9.4% had someone living alone who was 65 years of age or older.

There were 8,464 housing units, of which 8.3% were vacant. Among occupied housing units, 78.2% were owner-occupied and 21.8% were renter-occupied. The homeowner vacancy rate was 1.2% and the rental vacancy rate was 4.6%.

=== 2010 census ===
As of the census of 2010, there were 18,403 people, 6,780 households, and 5,072 families residing in the county. The population density was 117.8 people per square mile (45.5 people/km^{2}). There were 7,509 housing units at an average density of 48.1 per square mile (18.6/km^{2}). The racial makeup of the county was 87.6% White, 6.3% Black or African American, 0.19% Native American, 0.45% Asian, 0.2% Pacific Islander, 0.64% from other races, and 2.2% from two or more races. 4.2% of the population were Hispanic or Latino of any race.

There were 6,780 households, out of which 32.2% had children under the age of 18 living with them, 59% were married couples living together, 11.1% had a female householder with no husband present, and 25.2% were non-families. 20.1% of all households were made up of individuals, and 6.6% had someone living alone who was 65 years of age or older. The average household size was 2.69 and the average family size was 3.08. The median age for all individuals in the county was 59.3 years.

The median income for a household in the county was $54,307 and median family income was $60,414. The per capita income for the county was $24,696. 8.4% of the population and 4.9% of families were below the poverty line. Out of the total population, 8.6% of those under the age of 18 and 11.8% of those 65 and older were living below the poverty line.

== Government ==
=== Local Representation at Federal and State Level ===
- Democrat Eugene Vindman in the U.S. House of Representatives as part of the 7th District.
- Republican Karen Hamilton in the Virginia House of Delegates (62nd District)
- Republican Bryce E. Reeves in the Virginia State Senate (28th District)

==== History ====
Before the 2024 session, Greene County had been part of Virginia's 58th House of Delegates district and Virginia's 24th Senate district.

Before the 2022 session, Greene County had been part of the Virginia's 5th congressional district.

In May 2022, County Commissioner of Revenue Larry Vernon Snow resigned and pled guilty to federal charges of witness tampering. He had held the position since 1987 and had been reelected while under indictment. His son, Bryant Austin Snow, also pled guilty to charges of drug distribution.

=== Board of Supervisors ===
The Board of Supervisors contains five members:

- At-Large District: Marie Durrer (Interim)
- Midway District: Matt Hartung
- Monroe District: Timothy L Goolsby
- Ruckersville District: Davis Lamb (I)
- Stanardsville District: Steve Catalano

=== Constitutional officers ===
- Clerk of the Circuit Court: Ashby Lamb-Gomez
- Commissioner of Revenue: Kim Tate (I)
- Commonwealth's Attorney: Edwin "Win" Consolvo (I)
- Sheriff: Steven S. Smith (I)
- Treasurer: Dawn Lotts Marshall

=== Law enforcement ===
Greene County Sheriff's Office
- Abbreviation: GCSO

Agency overview
- Formed: 1838
- Employees: 56

Jurisdictional structure
- Constituting instrument: Yes
- General nature: Local civilian police

Operational structure
- Headquarters: Stanardsville, Virginia
- Deputys: 39
- Civilians: 17
- Agency executive: Steve Smith, Sheriff

Website
- Official Website

The Greene County Sheriff's Office (GCSO) is Greene County, Virginia's primary law enforcement agency.

After a 1994 study rated Greene County the second most dangerous county in Virginia for traffic, the Sheriff's office cracked down on speeding. In 1997, the office wrote 15 times more tickets than in 1992.

In November 2016, a few days before election day, the Sheriff's department held a public seminar at Piedmont Virginia Community College on Islam and jihadism. Counter-protestors described the content as islamophobic, and the group that spoke at the seminar was later added to the Southern Poverty Law Center's list of hate groups.

=== Presidential election results ===
United States presidential election results for Greene County, Virginia
| Year | Republican | | Democratic | | Third party(ies) | |
| Year | No. | % | No. | % | No. | % |
|---|---|---|---|---|---|---|
| 1912 | 141 | 29.44% | 238 | 49.69% | 100 | 20.88% |
| 1916 | 239 | 51.96% | 221 | 48.04% | 0 | 0.00% |
| 1920 | 414 | 57.18% | 306 | 42.27% | 4 | 0.55% |
| 1924 | 240 | 44.86% | 285 | 53.27% | 10 | 1.87% |
| 1928 | 423 | 62.02% | 259 | 37.98% | 0 | 0.00% |
| 1932 | 258 | 39.57% | 394 | 60.43% | 0 | 0.00% |
| 1936 | 321 | 48.42% | 341 | 51.43% | 1 | 0.15% |
| 1940 | 282 | 43.72% | 363 | 56.28% | 0 | 0.00% |
| 1944 | 393 | 58.14% | 282 | 41.72% | 1 | 0.15% |
| 1948 | 420 | 58.82% | 261 | 36.55% | 33 | 4.62% |
| 1952 | 537 | 67.80% | 250 | 31.57% | 5 | 0.63% |
| 1956 | 539 | 63.49% | 246 | 28.98% | 64 | 7.54% |
| 1960 | 573 | 64.24% | 314 | 35.20% | 5 | 0.56% |
| 1964 | 641 | 58.06% | 460 | 41.67% | 3 | 0.27% |
| 1968 | 856 | 55.26% | 255 | 16.46% | 438 | 28.28% |
| 1972 | 1,208 | 78.24% | 318 | 20.60% | 18 | 1.17% |
| 1976 | 1,095 | 51.41% | 895 | 42.02% | 140 | 6.57% |
| 1980 | 1,702 | 60.55% | 925 | 32.91% | 184 | 6.55% |
| 1984 | 2,216 | 73.87% | 760 | 25.33% | 24 | 0.80% |
| 1988 | 2,234 | 69.29% | 899 | 27.88% | 91 | 2.82% |
| 1992 | 2,265 | 52.30% | 1,353 | 31.24% | 713 | 16.46% |
| 1996 | 2,351 | 55.29% | 1,440 | 33.87% | 461 | 10.84% |
| 2000 | 3,375 | 62.36% | 1,774 | 32.78% | 263 | 4.86% |
| 2004 | 4,570 | 65.86% | 2,240 | 32.28% | 129 | 1.86% |
| 2008 | 4,980 | 60.29% | 3,174 | 38.43% | 106 | 1.28% |
| 2012 | 5,569 | 61.72% | 3,290 | 36.46% | 164 | 1.82% |
| 2016 | 5,945 | 61.88% | 2,924 | 30.43% | 739 | 7.69% |
| 2020 | 6,866 | 60.70% | 4,163 | 36.80% | 282 | 2.49% |
| 2024 | 7,432 | 61.39% | 4,456 | 36.81% | 218 | 1.80% |

== Public services ==
Jefferson-Madison Regional Library is the regional library system that provides services to the citizens of Greene.

== Education ==
Greene County Public Schools is served by a high school (William Monroe High School), a middle school, and two elementary schools.

Greene County is the location of the Piedmont VA CC - Eugene Giuseppe Center.

== Communities ==

(Population according to the 2020 United States census)

| Towns: 1. Stanardsville (349) | | Census-designated places (CDP): 1. Ruckersville (1,484); 2. Twin Lakes (1,602) |
| Unincorporated Communities |
| Amicus; Barnes; Barboursville; Burtonville; Dawsonville | Dyke; Geer; Haneytown; Lydia | McMullen; Midway; Newtown; Pirkey | Quinque; St. George; Shady Grove; Simmons Gap | Upper Pocosin; Williams Fork |

== See also ==
- Greene County Sheriff's Office
- National Register of Historic Places listings in Greene County, Virginia
