= List of breweries in Virginia =

Virginia has a relatively large number of craft breweries per capita.

The following is a list of breweries in Virginia.

== Breweries ==
This list is separated into the various counties and independent cities in Virginia. In cases where an independent city also serves as the county seat of an adjacent county, that city has been included in the county's list.

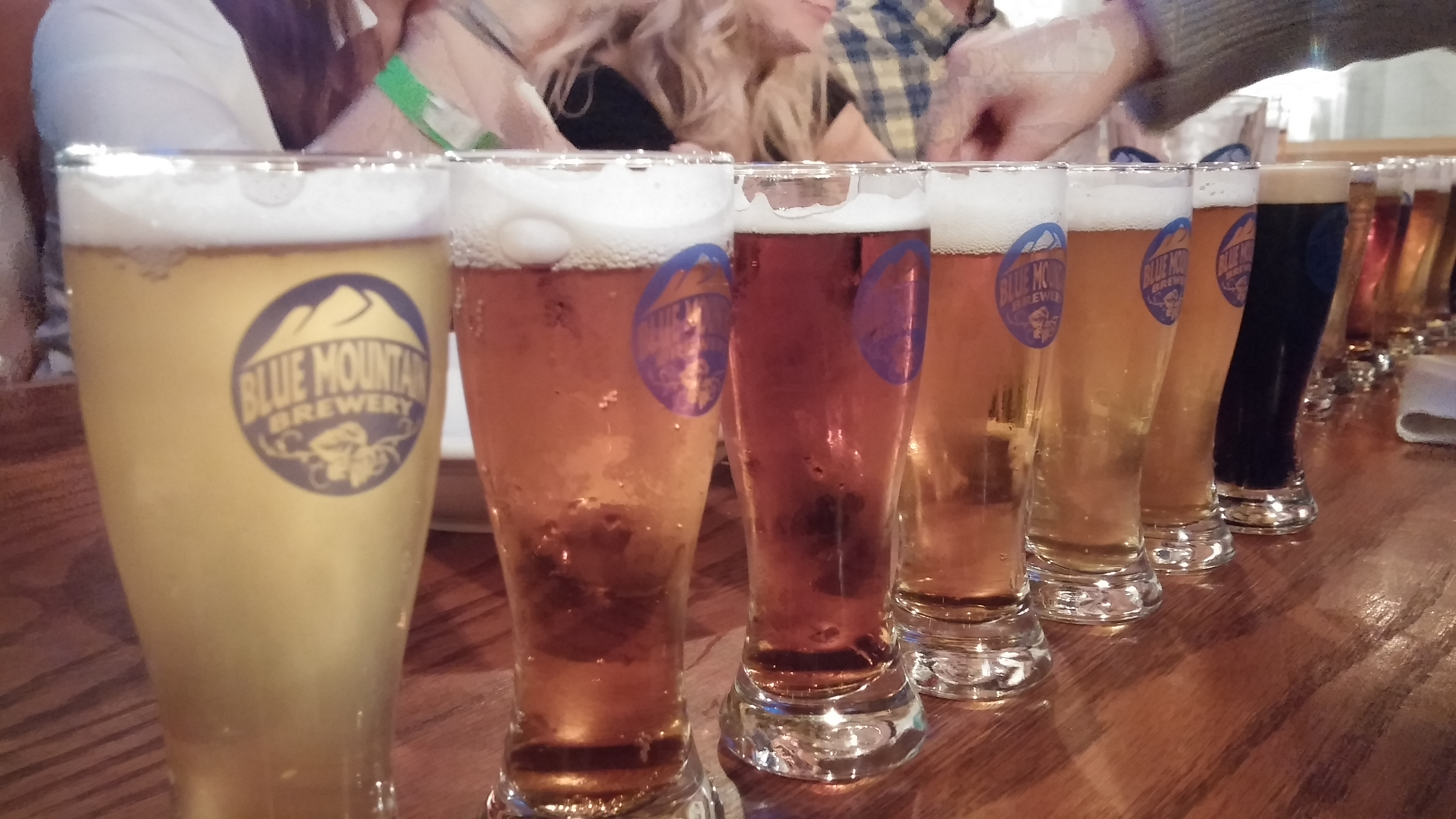
A flight of beers at the Blue Mountain Brewery, on the border of Nelson and Albemarle Counties

=== Albemarle County ===
- Champion Brewing Company, Charlottesville [CLOSED]
- Decipher Brewing
- Hazy Mountain Vineyards & Brewery
- Högwaller Brewing
- James River Brewery Scottsville
- Pro Re Nata, Charlottesville, Crozet
- Random Row Brewing Co., Charlottesville
- Rockfish Brewing Company
- Selvedge Brewing
- South Street Brewery, Charlottesville
- Starr Hill Brewery, Crozet
- Starr Hill Brewery Downtown, Charlottesville
- SuperFly Brewing Company
- Three Notch'd Brewing Company, Charlottesville

=== Amherst County ===
- Loose Shoe Brewing Company, Amherst

=== Alexandria ===
- Aslin
- Port City Brewing Company

=== Arlington ===
- Heritage Brewing
- New District Brewing Company [CLOSED]

=== Augusta County ===
- Redbeard Brewing Company, Staunton
- Shenandoah Valley Brewing Company, Staunton

=== Bedford County ===
- Apocalypse Ale Works, Forest
- Sunken City Brewery, Hardy
- Beale's Brewery, Bedford

=== Caroline County ===
- Rusty Beaver Brewery, Ruther Glen [CLOSED]

=== Charles City County ===
- 5 Fields Brewing Company

=== Chesapeake ===
- Big Ugly Brewing
- The Garage Brewery
- Studly Brewing Company
- Wasserhund Brewing Company

=== Chesterfield County ===
- Extra Billy's, Midlothian
- Steam Bell Brew Works, Midlothian

=== Culpeper County ===
- Beer Hound Brewery, Culpeper
- Far Gohn Brewing Company, Culpeper

=== Danville ===
- 2 Witches Winery & Brewing Company

=== Fairfax County ===
- Aslin Beer Company, Herndon
- Caboose Brewing, Vienna
- G34.3 Brewing Company, Lorton
- Fairwinds Brewing Company, Lorton
- Lake Anna Brew House
- Mustang Sally Brewing Company
- Ornery Beer Company
- Settle Down Easy Brewing Company

=== Falls Church ===
- Mad Fox Brewing Company [CLOSED]
- Sweetwater Tavern

=== Fauquier County ===
- Old Bust Head Brewing Company, Warrenton

=== Franklin County ===
- Chaos Mountain Brewing Company, Callaway
- Hammer & Forge Brewing Company, Boones Mill

=== Frederick County ===
- Backroom Brewery, Middletown

=== Fredericksburg ===
- Adventure Brewing Company, Eagle Village
- Battlefield Brewing Company
- Red Dragon Brewery
- Strangeways Brewing Fredericksburg
- The Port Oysteria & Brewery
- Water's End Brewery at Fredericksburg Square[CLOSED]

=== Galax ===
- Creek Bottom Brews

=== Goochland County ===
- Lickinghole Creek Farm Brewery, Goochland

=== Hampton ===
- Bull Island Brewing Company
- Caiseal Beer & Spirits Company
- Capstan Bar Brewing Company
- Nost Brewing Project
- Oozlefinch Beers and Blending
- St. George Brewing Company

=== Hanover County ===
- Intermission Beer Company - Brewpub & Arcade

=== Henrico County ===
- Final Gravity Brewing Company
- Intermission Beer Company - Brewery & Taproom
- Rock Bottom Brewery [CLOSED]
- The Answer Brewpub

=== James City County ===
- Alewerks Brewing Company L.A.B.
- Billsburg Brewery
- Frothy Moon Brewhouse

=== Loudoun County ===
- Adroit Theory Brewing Company, Purcellville
- Barnhouse Brewery, Leesburg
- Bear Chase Brewing Company
- Belly Love Brewing, Purcellville
- Beltway Brewing Company, Sterling [CLOSED]
- Bike TrAle Brewing, Leesburg [CLOSED]
- Black Hoof Brewing, Leesburg
- Black Walnut Brewery, Leesburg
- Bluemont Station Brewery & Winery
- Crooked Run Fermentation, Leesburg
- Crooked Run Fermentation, Sterling
- Dog Money Restaurant and Brewery, Leesburg [CLOSED]
- Dirt Farm Brewing, Bluemont
- Dragon Hops Brewing Company, Purcellville [CLOSED]
- Dynasty Brewing
- Dynasty Brewing West
- Flying Ace Brewery @ Flying Ace Farm
- Harpers Ferry Brewing
- Harvest Gap Brewery
- Holy Brew Brewing Company, Leesburg [CLOSED]
- Honor Brewing Company
- Jack's Run Brewing, Purcellville [CLOSED]
- Juicy Brewing Company
- Lark Brewing Company
- Lost Barrel Brewing
- Lost Rhino Brewing Company, Ashburn
  - Lost Rhino Retreat, Brambleton
- Loudoun Brewing Company, Leesburg
- MacDowell Brew Kitchen, Leesburg - Not a brewery
- Ocelot Brewery, Sterling
- Old 690, Purcellville
- Old Ox Brewery, Ashburn
- Ono Brewing Company
- Quattro Goomba's Brewery, Aldie
- Rocket Frog Brewery, Sterling [CLOSED]
- Solace Brewing Company, Sterling
- Twinpanzee Brewing Company, Sterling [CLOSED]
- Vanish Farmwoods Brewery

=== Madison County ===
- Bald Top Brewing Company, Madison

=== Manassas ===
- 2 Silos Brewing Co.
- BadWolf Brewing Company [CLOSED]
- Brightworks Brewing Company
- Heritage Brewing Company

=== Montgomery County ===
- Bull & Bones Brewhaus, Blacksburg
- Right Mind Brewery, Blacksburg
- Rising Silo Brewery, Blacksburg

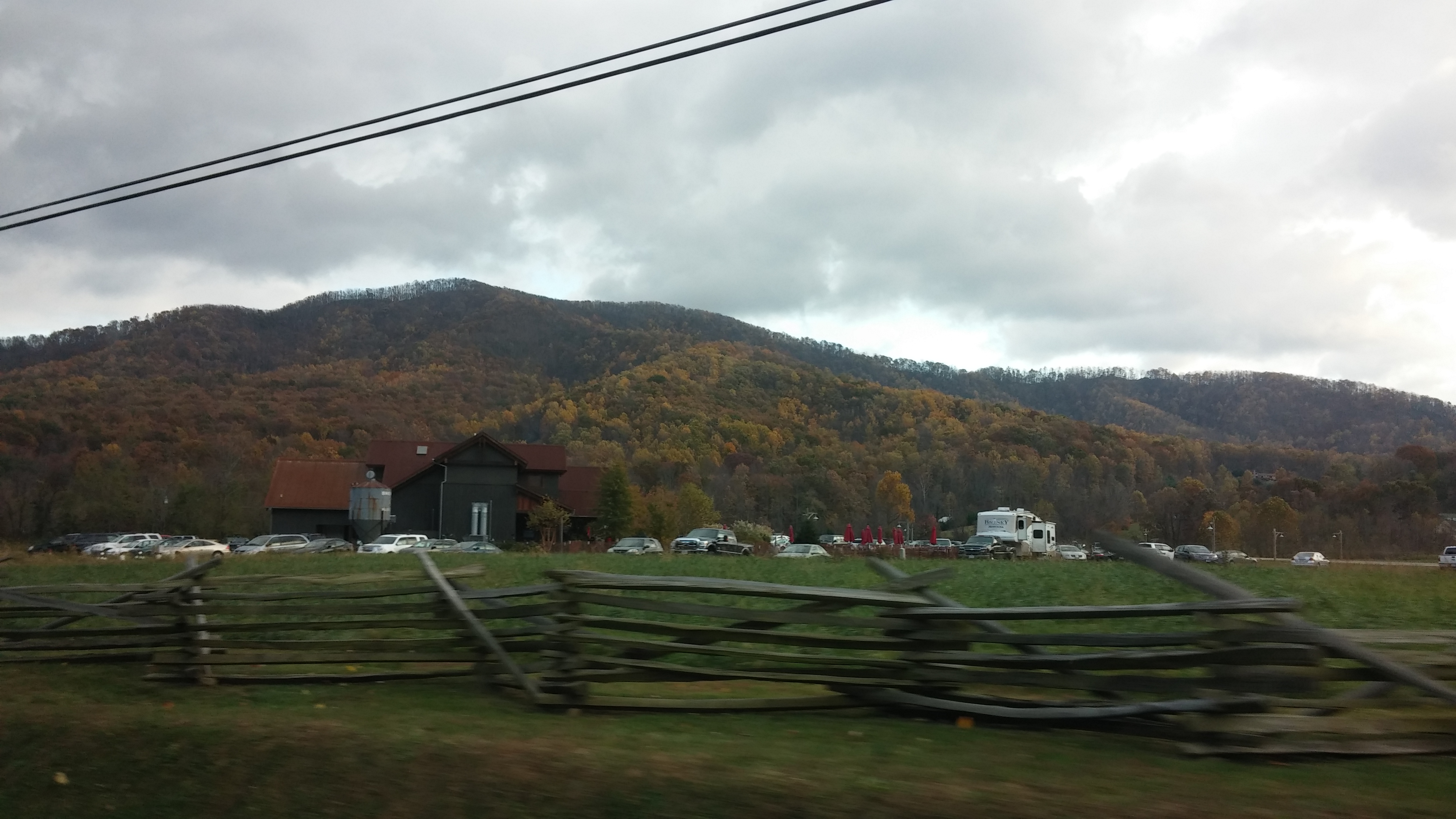
The Basecamp brew house of Devil's Backbone Brewery in Albemarle County, Virginia

=== Nelson County ===
- Blue Mountain Brewery, Afton
  - Blue Mountain Barrel House
- Brewing Tree Beer Company
- Devils Backbone Brewing Company, Roseland
- Outback Brewhouse
- Three Notch'd Brewery, Distillery & Craft Kitchen
- Wild Wolf Brewing Company, Nellysford [CLOSED]
- WildManDan Brewery
- Wood Ridge Farm Brewery

=== Newport News ===
- 1700 Brewing
- Coastal Fermentory
- Tradition Brewing Company

=== Norfolk ===
- Afterglow Brewing
- Armed Forces Brewing Company [CLOSED]
- Bold Mariner Brewing Company
- COVA Brewing Company
- Elation Brewing
- Maker's Craft Brewery
- O'Connor Brewing Company [CLOSED]
- Rip Rap Brewing Company
- Smartmouth Brewing Company
- The Veil Brewing Company

=== Pulaski County ===
- River Brewing Company, Fairlawn

=== Richmond ===
- The Answer Brewpub
- Ardent Craft Ales
- Basic City Beer Company - Southside RVA
- Benchtop Brewing
- Brainstorm Brewhouse
- Center of the Universe Brewing Company
- Crazy Rooster Brewing Company
- Dancing Kilt Brewery [CLOSED]
- Final Gravity Brewing Company
- Fine Creek Brewing Company
- Garden Grove Brewing and Urban Winery
- Hardywood Park Craft Brewery
- Hidden Wit Brewing Company
- Isley Brewing Company [CLOSED]
- Kindred Spirit Brewing
- Legend Brewing Company
- Main Line Brewery
- Midnight Brewery
- Origin Beer Lab
- Richbrau Brewing
- Starr Hill Beer Hall & Rooftop
- Steam Bell Beer Works [CLOSED]
- Strangeways Brewing
- Strangeways Brewing - Scott's Addition
- Tabol Brewing [CLOSED]
- Three Leg Run
- Three Notch'd Brewing Company
- Triple Crossing Brewing Company - Downtown
- Triple Crossing Brewing Company - Midlothian
- Triple Crossing Brewing Company - Fulton
- Väsen Brewing Company
- The Veil Brewing Co.
- The Veil Brewing Company - Forest Hill
- WayGone Brewery

=== Roanoke ===
- Big Lick Brewing Company
- Soaring Ridge Craft Brewers [CLOSED]
- A Few Old Goats Brewing

=== Roanoke County ===
- Parkway Brewing, Salem
- Twin Creeks Brewing, Vinton

=== Rockbridge County ===
- Blue Lab Brewing Company, Lexington
- Devils Backbone Brewing Company - The Outpost, Lexington

=== Rockingham County ===
- Brothers Brewing, Harrisonburg

=== Spotsylvania County ===
- 1781 Brewing Co.
- Log Home Brewing Company
- Maltese Brewing Company FXBG

=== Stafford County ===
- 6 Bears & A Goat Brewing Company
- Adventure Brewing Company
- Barley Naked Brewing Co.
- Highmark Brewery
- Laudenbach Brewing

=== Suffolk ===
- Harbor Trail Brewing Company
- MoMac Brewing Company
- New Realm Brewing Company (Opening Fall 2024)
- Sojourn Fermentory

=== Virginia Beach ===
- Back Bay Brewing Company
- Back Bay Brew House Farmhouse
- Commonwealth Brewing Company
- Home Republic Brewing Company
- New Realm Brewing Company
- Pleasure House Brewing Company
- Reaver Beach Brewing Company
- Three Notch'd Brewery & Craft Kitchen
- Vibrant Shore Brewing Company
- Voodoo Brewing
- Wasserhund Brewing Company
- Young Veterans Brewing Company

=== Washington County ===
- Old Glade Brewery, Glade Spring
- The Damascus Brewery, Damascus
- Wolf Hills Brewing Company, Abingdon

=== Waynesboro ===
- Seven Arrows Brewing Company

=== Williamsburg ===
(See also James City County and York County for regional breweries)

- Brass Cannon Brewing Company [CLOSED]
- Precarious Beer Project
- Strangeways Brewing

=== York County ===
- Alewerks Brewing Company
- The Virginia Beer Company

== See also ==
- Beer in the United States
- List of breweries in the United States
- List of microbreweries
