= Crozet, Virginia =

Crozet
- Census-designated place
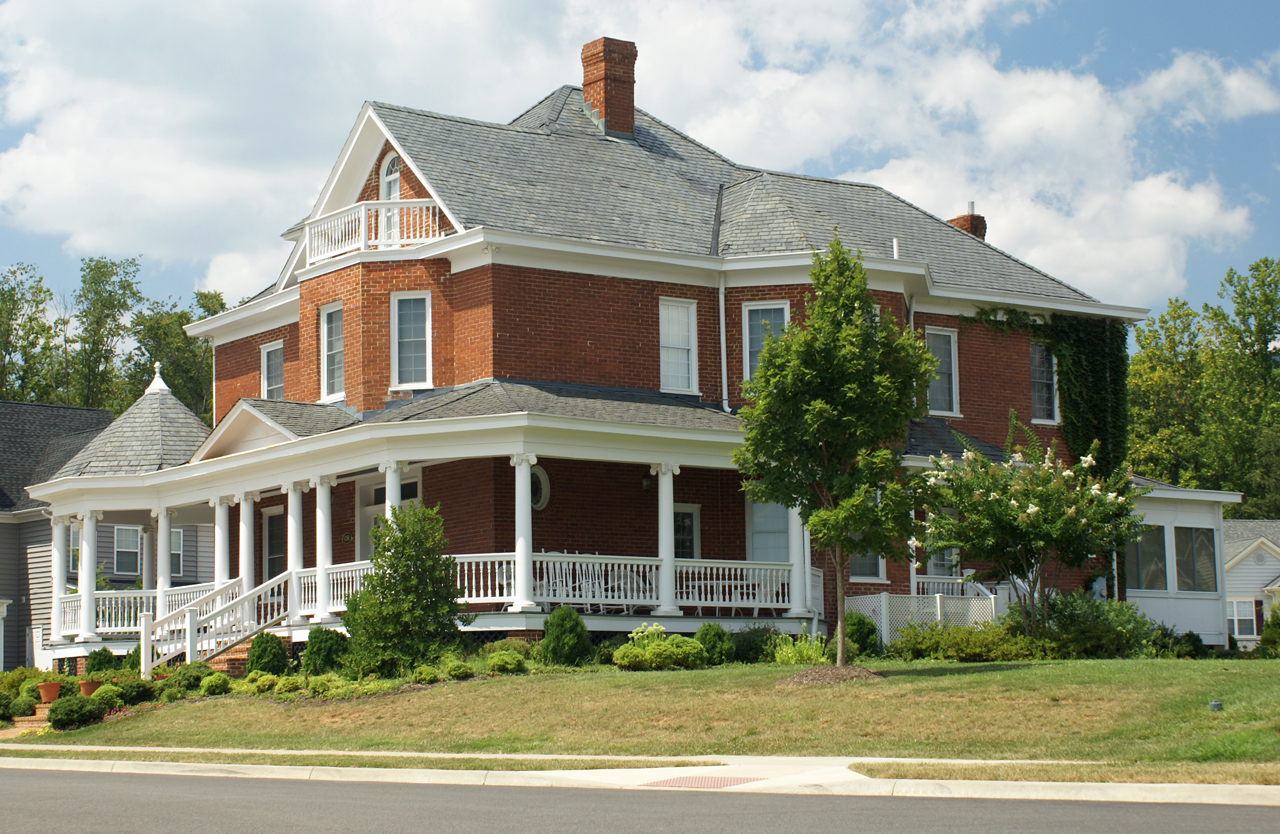
- The Bain House

- Flag

- Location of the Crozet CDP within Albemarle county

- Location in Virginia
- Coordinates: 38°4′12″N 78°42′6″W
- Country: United States
- State: Virginia
- County: Albemarle County

Area
  - Total: 3.7 sq mi (9.7 km^{2})
  - Land: 3.7 sq mi (9.7 km^{2})

Population (2010)
  - Total: 5,565
  - Density: 1,500/sq mi (570/km^{2})
- Time zone: UTC−5 (EST)
  - Summer (DST): UTC−4 (EDT)
- GNIS feature ID: 2389381

Crozet /ˌkroʊˈzeɪ/ kroh-ZAY is a census-designated place (CDP) in Albemarle County in the Commonwealth of Virginia, United States. It sits along the I-64 corridor, about 12 miles (19 km) west of Charlottesville and 21 miles (34 km) east of Staunton. Crozet is part of the Charlottesville Metropolitan Statistical Area. As of the 2020 census, Crozet had a population of 9,224.

The Crozet Historic District was listed on the National Register of Historic Places in 2012.

== History ==
Originally called "Wayland's Crossing," it was renamed in 1870 in honor of Colonel Claudius Crozet, the French-born civil engineer who directed the construction of the Blue Ridge Tunnel. The cornerstone of Crozet is believed to have been Pleasant Green, a property also known as the Ficklin-Wayland Farm, located yards from the actual Wayland Crossing. Claudius Crozet is said to have lodged in that property while surveying the land that today honors his name.

== Geography ==
According to the United States Census Bureau, the CDP has a total area of 9.7 km^{2} (3.7 mi^{2}), all land.

== Demographics ==
Historical population
Census	Pop.	Note	%±
2000	2,820		—
2010	5,565		97.3%
2020	9,224		65.8%
U.S. Decennial Census; 2010 2020

As of the census of 2010, there were 5,565 people, 2,119 households, and 1,522 families residing in the CDP. The population density was 1,504.1 people per square mile (573.7/km^{2}). There were 2,229 housing units at an average density of 602.4/sq mi (229.8/km^{2}). The racial makeup of the CDP was 90.2% White, 4.1% African American, 0.1% Native American, 3.3% Asian, 0.6% from other races, and 1.3% from two or more races. Hispanic or Latino of any race were 3.1% of the population.

There were 2,119 households, out of which 40.3% had children under the age of 18 living with them, 59.7% were married couples living together, 9.8% had a female householder with no spouse present, and 28.2% were non-families. 23.7% of all households were made up of individuals, and 10.7% had someone living alone who was 65 years of age or older. The average household size was 2.62 and the average family size was 3.15.

In the CDP, the population was spread out, with 29.8% under the age of 18, 4.4% from 18 to 24, 27.8% from 25 to 44, 26.2% from 45 to 64, and 11.9% who were 65 years of age or older. The median age was 38.3 years. For every 100 females, there were 88 males. For every 100 females age 18 and over, there were 87 males.

The median income for a household in the CDP was $68,608, and the median income for a family was $85,976. Males had a median income of $53,415 versus $41,292 for females. The per capita income for the CDP was $32,266. About 4.6% of families and 7.1% of the population were below the poverty line, including 6.2% of those under age 18 and 14.4% of those age 65 or over.

== Economy ==
Historically, Crozet was strategically important as a depot and transportation hub for the local apple and peach growing industries. Morton Frozen Foods had its flagship manufacturing plant in Crozet from August 1, 1953, until the late 1990s. In 2000, the plant was closed by food packaging company ConAgra Foods, which owned the brand, laying off more than 600 employees. As of 2016, Musictoday, acquired in 2014 by San Francisco-based Delivery Agent Inc., an interactive entertainment-commerce firm, operates out of the building, as does Starr Hill Brewery, which moved from Charlottesville in 2006.

From 1990 to 2005, Crozet saw increasing housing development, in part because of nearby Charlottesville's reputation as a desirable location, but also because Albemarle County named Crozet as a designated growth area. Some 95% of the County remains designated as rural.

In 2001, the Albemarle County Board of Supervisors approved a framework dubbed the "Crozet Master Plan", developed by a local architect and regional planning firm, to regulate development patterns and provide a public forum for discussing the topic. The Master Plan allows the population of Crozet, then around 3,000, to quadruple to more than 12,000 by the 2020s. These numbers alarmed some long-time residents who are accustomed to the rural tranquility of Crozet; more than a thousand people petitioned the county to reduce the number of planned households. In 2006, a plan was approved to redevelop the old Barnes Lumber property, which encompasses much of the downtown section. In 2007, the population passed 7,000.

Around 2017, Piedmont Place, a complex of luxury apartments and various restaurants and shops, was built in downtown Crozet.

== Arts and culture ==
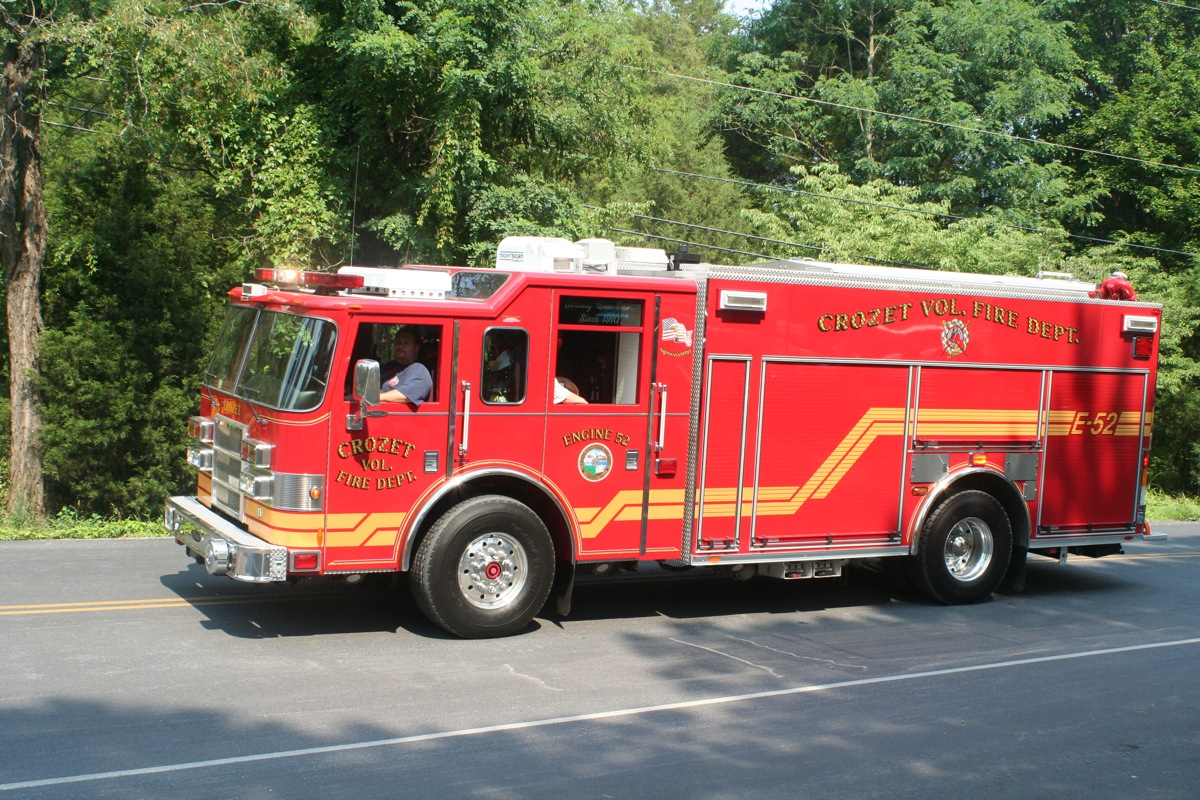
Crozet Volunteer Fire Department Engine 52 truck during a local parade

Festivals include the Crozet Arts and Crafts Festival and the Guam Festival. The Crozet Arts and Crafts Festival showcases art and products from vendors across the East Coast. The Crozet Library was originally located in a railway depot built in 1923 by the Chesapeake and Ohio Railway. A new library, the Crozet/Western Albemarle Library, is located here.

== Parks and recreation ==
Claudius Crozet Park is a 22-acre (89,000 m^{2}) park which includes athletic fields, ball courts, playgrounds, a dog park, pool, and fitness center.

== Education ==
=== Schools ===
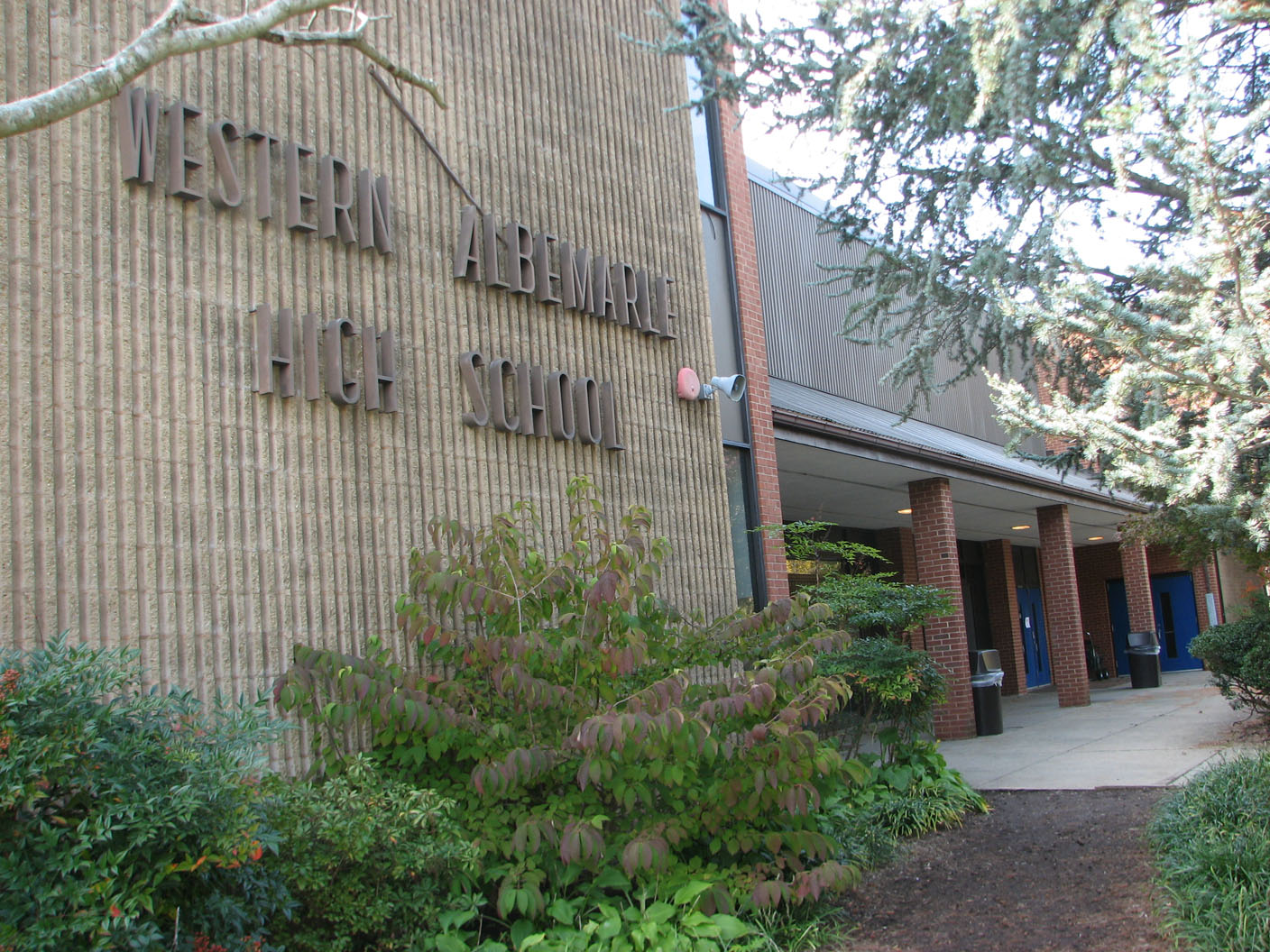
Western Albemarle High School

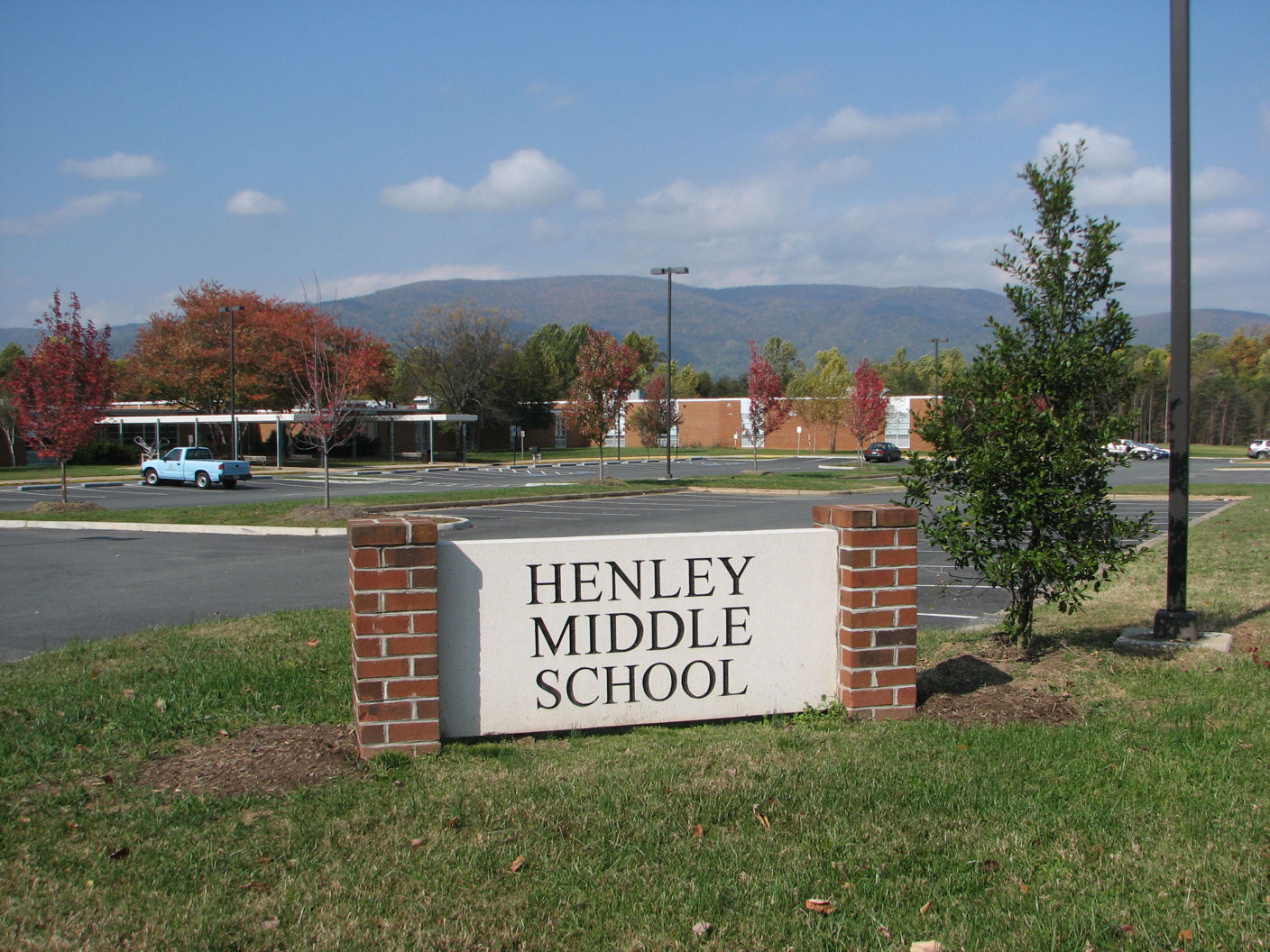
J. T. Henley Middle School

Crozet is served by Western Albemarle High School, J. T. Henley Middle School, Brownsville Elementary School, Meriwether Lewis Elementary School, Murray Elementary School and Crozet Elementary School. All schools in Crozet are part of Albemarle County Public Schools.

== Media ==
The 2007 comedy film Evan Almighty (the sequel to Bruce Almighty) was partially filmed in Crozet. The ark seen in the movie, as well as the set for Evan's neighborhood, was constructed there. The film set was situated on a plot of land across from Western Albemarle High School, Old Trail, which later became a popular housing subdivision.

== Notable people ==
- Muhammad Ali, boxer, owned a farm outside Crozet.
- Billy Wagner, baseball player and member of the National Baseball Hall of Fame.
- Rita Mae Brown, author and activist
- Ellis Paul, singer-songwriter and leading figure in the Boston Folk movement.
- Remedy Rule, Olympian, swimmer
- Thomas Heilman, Olympian, swimmer, youngest male Olympic swimmer since Michael Phelps
- Martin Hehir, distance runner

== In popular culture ==
Author Rita Mae Brown has written a mystery series commonly called the 'Mrs. Murphy series' that takes place in Crozet.
