= Morton Frozen Foods =

American foods company

Morton Frozen Foods is the brand name of a now-discontinued line of frozen foods, including honey buns, jelly donuts, and pot pies, that was distributed nationwide in the United States for almost 50 years. It was ultimately acquired by ConAgra Foods.

== History ==
In 1940, Harold Morton began making a chicken and noodle dish sold in glass jars in Louisville, Kentucky. The business transitioned to frozen foods after World War II, and the product line expanded to pot pies and dessert pastries. The manufacturing plant relocated to Crozet, Virginia, in Albemarle County and Webster City, Iowa.

Morton Frozen Foods' ownership changed several times. Its owners would include the Continental Baking Company, Del Monte (which itself was a division of R.J. Reynolds), and finally ConAgra Foods, which shut down the Crozet plant in 2000. A group of Morton Frozen Foods enthusiasts are attempting to bring some Morton products back. Composed largely of former employees, descendants of Morton employees, and fans of the brand-many of who are based around Crozet, the group is embarking on a campaign to put Morton back on the map.
