= Starr Hill Brewery =

- Founded: 1999; 27 years ago
- Headquarters: Crozet, Virginia; United States
- Products: Beer

Starr Hill Brewery was founded in 1999 in the city of Charlottesville, Virginia, by Mark Thompson, his wife Kristin Dolan, and music executive Coran Capshaw. The brewery takes its name from the neighborhood where it was originally located. In 2005, the brewery moved to nearby Crozet, Virginia. After Thompson retired in early 2015, brand and recipe development leader Robbie O'Cain was tapped as Brewmaster. In September 2017, Starr Hill opened the Pilot Brewery & Side Stage in Roanoke, Virginia.

Starr Hill brews 28,000 barrels per year in Crozet and Roanoke.

Starr Hill beer can be found throughout the southeast United States. The brewery has won several awards for its beer, in particular the Dark Starr Stout, which was in 2006 called the most decorated Dry Irish stout in the American craft brewing scene.

Along with South Street Brewery, Blue Mountain Brewery, Wild Wolf Brewing Company and Devils Backbone Brewing Company, Starr Hill forms the Brew Ridge Trail. Starr Hill also helped create the Virginia Brewers Guild, a coalition of independent, small, commercial breweries dedicated to growing the craft beer industry in the Commonwealth. Starr Hill's founder was Chair of the Guild in 2014.
