= Blue Mountain Brewery =

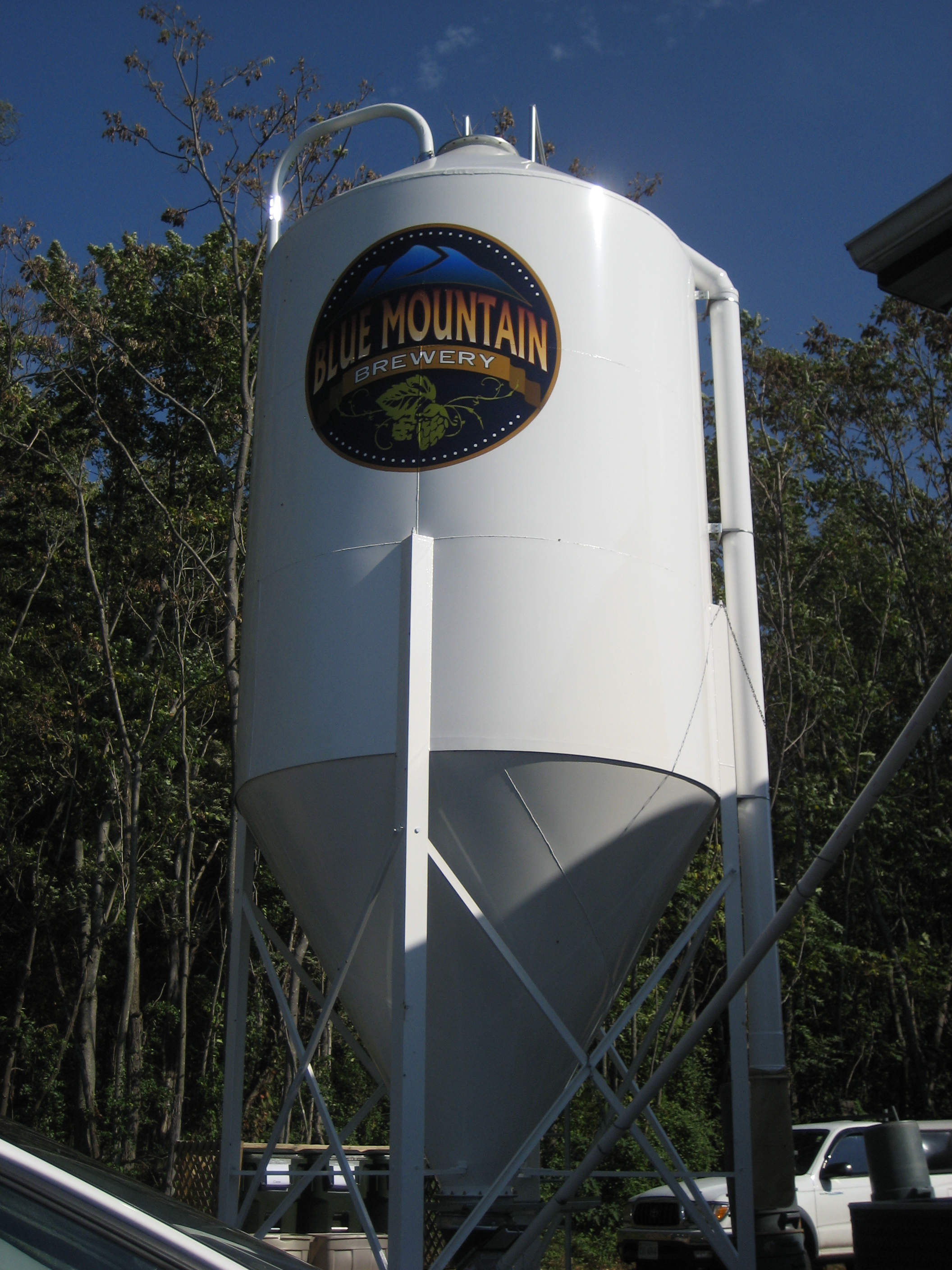
- The pils malt grain silo behind the brewery.
- Industry: Alcoholic beverage
- Founded: October 2007
- Headquarters: Afton, Virginia, USA
- Products: Beer
- Production output: 2012 capacity, 2,800 barrels/year
- Owner: Taylor and Mandi Smack, Matt Nucci, 31 other shareholders

The Blue Mountain Brewery in Afton, Virginia is a brewery that is part of Virginia's Brew Ridge Trail along with Devils Backbone Brewing Company, Starr Hill Brewery, and others in the area. Blue Mountain was the first microbrewery to open in Nelson County. They cultivate 1/3 acre of mainly Cascade-variety hops and have had a focus on the industry's agricultural traditions since they opened. One of their seasonal beers, Blue Reserve, took home the first-ever medal (Silver) for a beer hopped solely with Virginia hops at the world's largest beer competition, the Great American Beer Festival, in 2011 for the American-Belgo Ale category.
