= Crozet Historic District =

Historic district in Virginia, United States

- U.S. National Register of Historic Places
- U.S. Historic district
- Virginia Landmarks Register
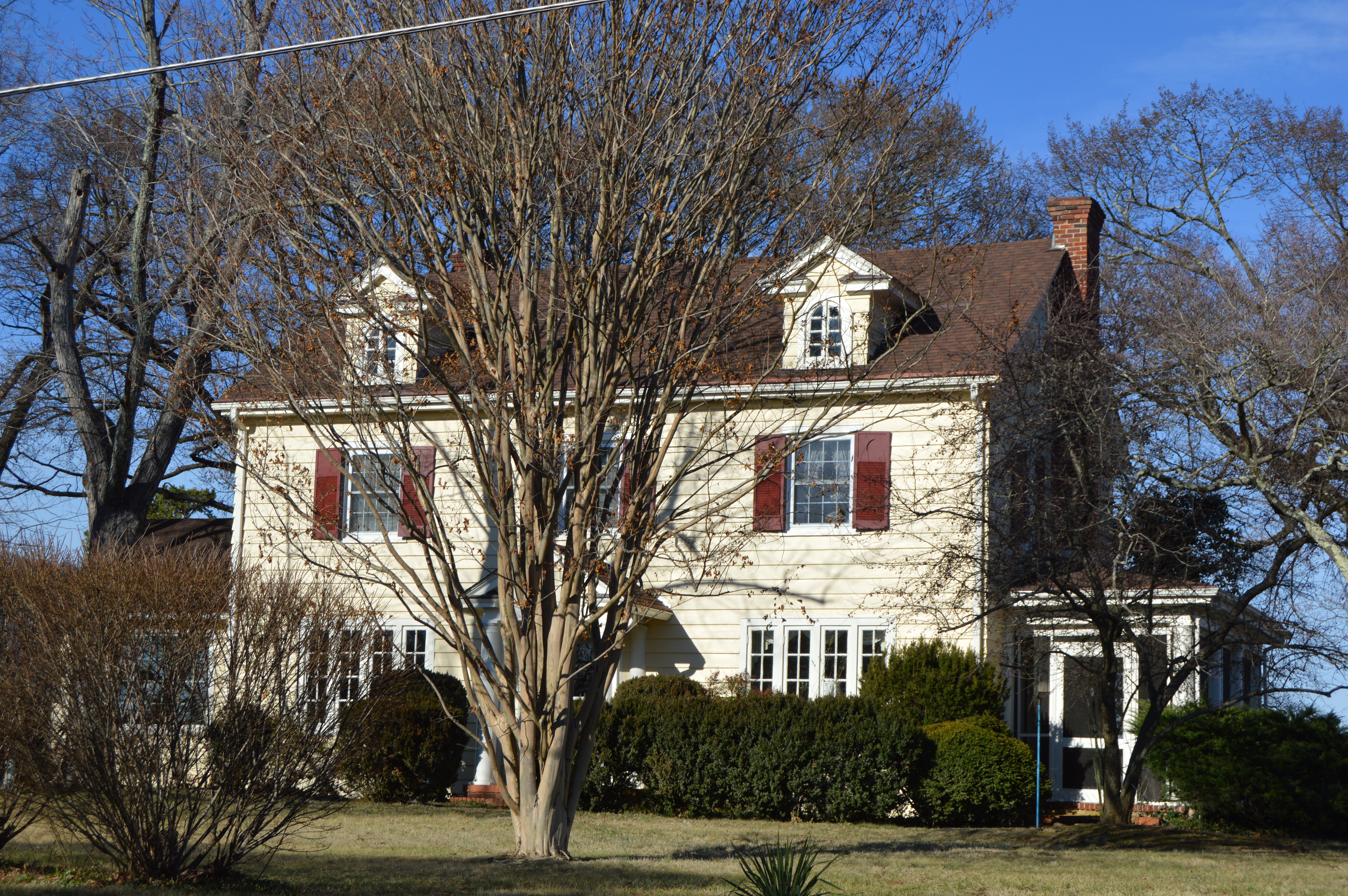
- House on St. George Avenue

- Location within Virginia Location within the United States
- Location: Crozet, Albemarle County, Virginia, USA
- Coordinates: 38°04′18″N 78°42′01″W
- Area: 167.49 acres (67.78 ha)
- Built: Various
- Architectural style: Greek Revival, Gothic Revival, Italianate, Queen Anne, Victorian, Colonial Revival, Tudor Revival, Post-Modern
- NRHP reference No.: 12000985
- VLR No.: 002-5087

Significant dates
- Added to NRHP: November 28, 2012
- Designated VLR: September 20, 2012

The Crozet Historic District is a national historic district located in Crozet, Albemarle County, Virginia. The historic district was listed on the National Register of Historic Places on November 28, 2012. It includes 227 properties deemed to contribute to the historic character of the area along with 73 additional non-contributing properties for a total of 300 properties. They include representative examples of the mid-19th century Greek Revival and Gothic Revival styles, late-Victorian Italianate, Queen Anne, and Victorian styles and from the late-19th century- and early-20th century, Colonial Revival, Tudor Revival, Bungalow/Craftsman and Commercial styles. The district also includes examples of modern-era Postmodern style.
