= Roseland, Virginia =

Unincorporated community in Virginia, US

Coordinates: 37°44′52″N 78°58′33″W

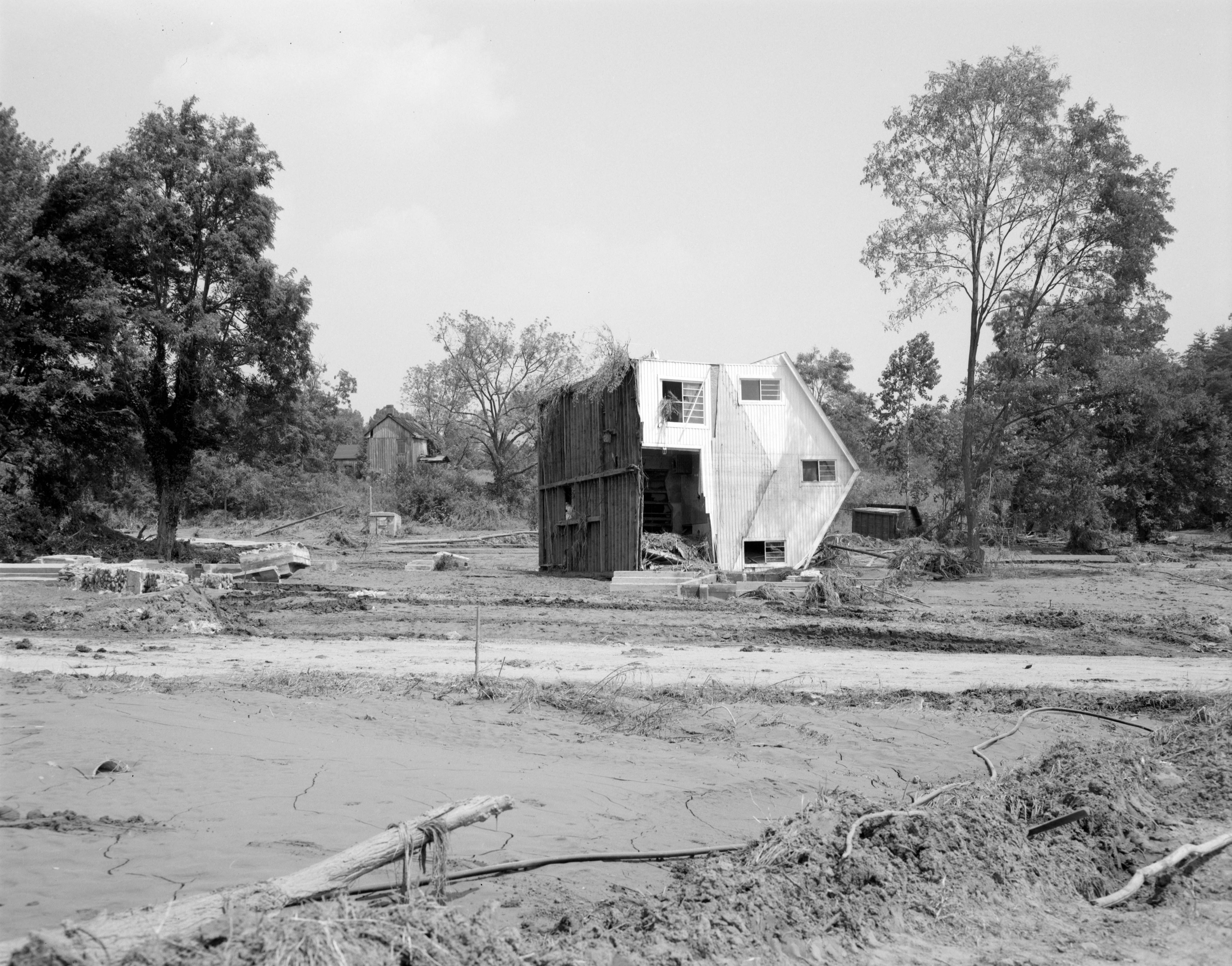
A home in Roseland which was flipped off its foundation by Hurricane Camille

Roseland is an unincorporated community in Nelson County, Virginia, United States. It was among the communities severely affected by flash flooding from Hurricane Camille in 1969.

Roseland is home to the Devils Backbone Brewing Company.

== Notable person ==
- Thomas Withers, U.S. Navy Rear Admiral and submariner
