= Afton, Virginia =

Census-designated place in Virginia, US

- Census-designated place
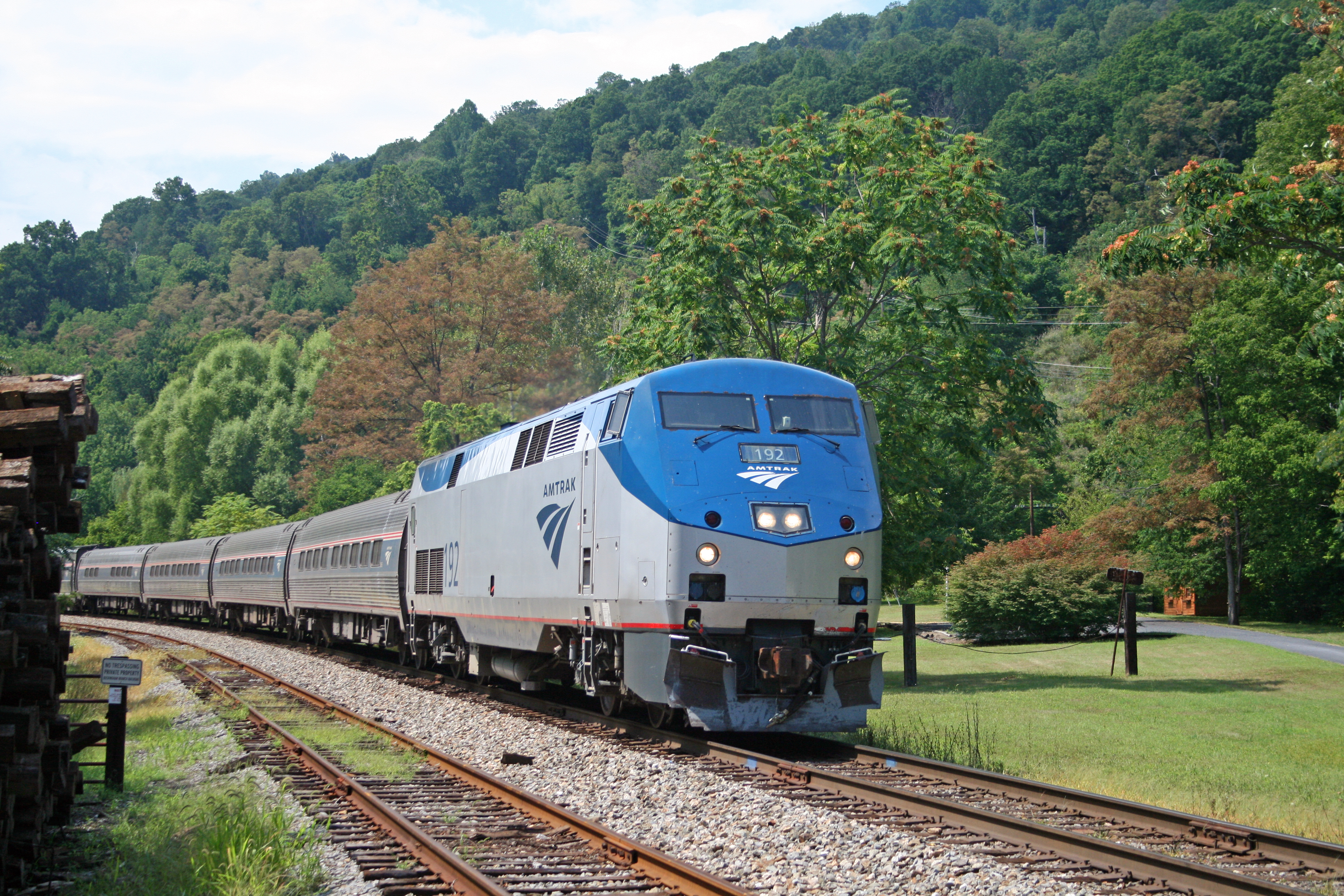
- Amtrak's Cardinal passes through Afton in 2009. No trains stop in Afton.

- Location of Afton within Albemarle County

- Location of Afton in Virginia Afton, Virginia (the United States)
- Coordinates: 38°01′56″N 78°50′21″W
- Country: United States
- State: Virginia
- Counties: Albemarle, Nelson
- Elevation: 1,362 ft (415 m)

Population (2021)
  - Total: 313
- Time zone: UTC-5 (Eastern (EST))
  - Summer (DST): UTC-4 (EDT)
- ZIP code: 22920
- Area code: 540
- FIPS code: 51-00484
- GNIS feature ID: 1499043

Afton is an unincorporated community and census-designated place in Albemarle and Nelson counties in the Commonwealth of Virginia. It is newly listed as a CDP in the 2020 census with a population of 313.

== Geography ==
Afton is located in the foothills of the Blue Ridge Mountains, approximately 20 miles (32 km) west of Charlottesville.

== Economy ==
Afton is home to Trager Brothers Coffee, Hazy Mountain Vineyards & Brewery, Silverback Distillery, Veritas Vineyard and Winery, the Brewing Tree Beer Company, the Blue Mountain Brewery and Cardinal Point Vineyard & Winery.

== Demographics ==
Afton first appeared as a census-designated place in the 2020 U.S. census.

== Points of interest ==
Scott Castle, also known as the Royal Orchard, is a 25,000-square foot Tudor Gothic-style mansion built in 1911 by Richmond, Virginia engineer Henry Baskervill and architect John Russell Pope. The Royal Orchard name originated in 1837, when Andrew Stephenson, the U.S. ambassador to the United Kingdom, introduced a basketful of Newtown Pippin apples that he had grown in his orchard to Queen Victoria, and they quickly became a royal favorite.

In October 1968, the Scott family held a charity event at their castle by hosting an art auction to raise money for the local fire and rescue services. This was the only time that the home was open to the public. It was reported that an estimated 4,600 visitors and 1,000 automobiles appeared around the mansion, often blocking U. S. Route 250. After the event, the family closed the property to the public.

In 2009, home building company Alexander Nicholson partnered with John Milner Architects to restore the castle.

== Notable people ==
- Rita Mae Brown, novelist, poet, screenwriter, activist
- Mary Chapin Carpenter, songwriter, musician
- June Curry, benefactor to bicyclists on the Transamerica Trail
- Paul F. Gorman, former commander-in-chief of the United States Southern Command

== See also ==
- Rockfish Gap
