= Devils Backbone Brewing Company =

Brewpub located in Roseland, Virginia, U.S

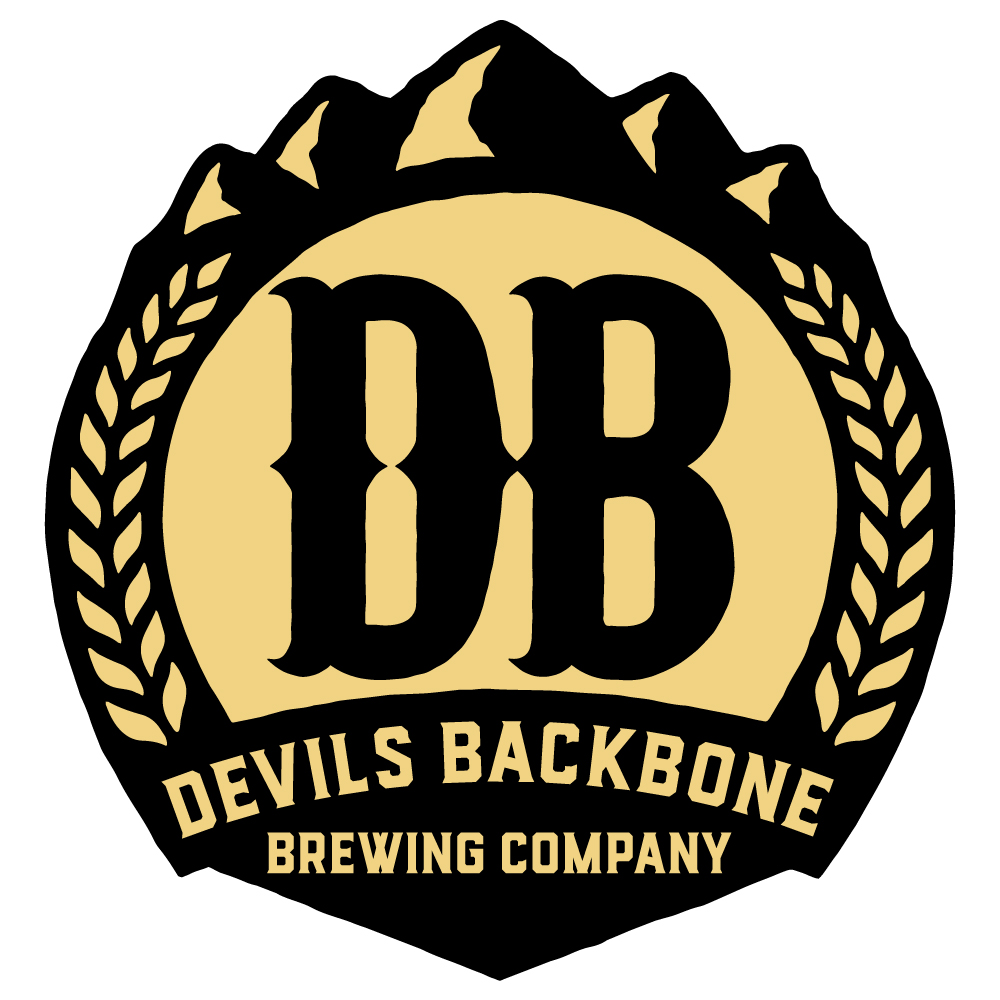
- Location: Roseland, Virginia, US
- Opened: 2008
- Annual production volume: 84,000 US beer barrels (99,000 hl)
- Owner: Anheuser-Busch InBev

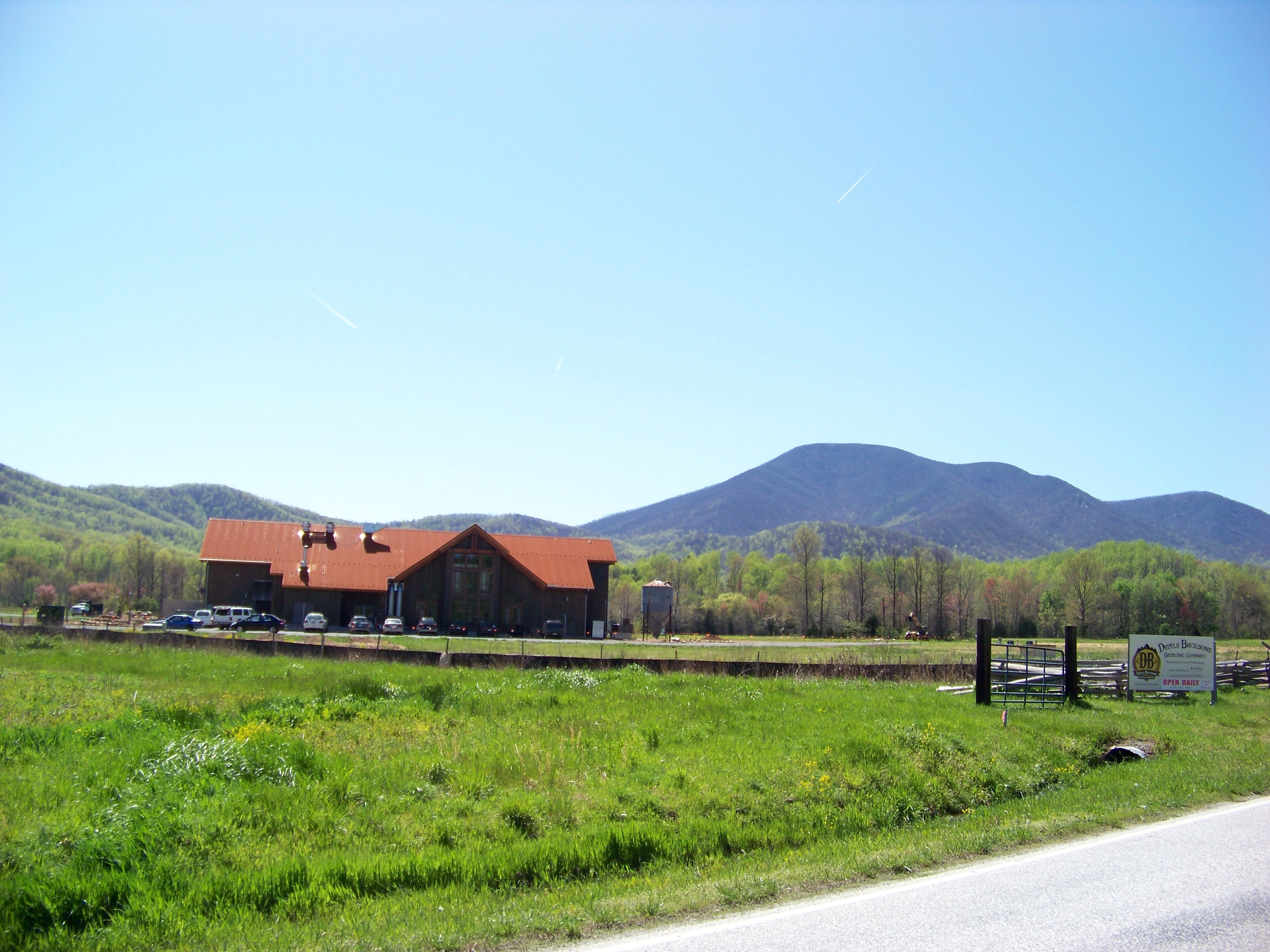
Devils Backbone Brewing Company

The Devils Backbone Brewing Company is a brewpub located in Roseland, Virginia, owned by Anheuser-Busch InBev. It was established in 2008 by Steven Crandall. In 2012, a 15,000 square foot production facility and tap room, referred to as "The Outpost", was established near Lexington, Virginia. In 2016, the company was purchased by Anheuser-Busch InBev, meaning that Devils Backbone Brewing Company would no longer meet the Brewers Association definition of a "craft brewery", since ownership by Anheuser-Busch InBev exceeds the definition's 25% maximum ownership by a non-craft brewery.

== History ==
Steven and Heidi Crandall founded the Devils Backbone Brewery Company in 2008. The brewing facility was built on a 100-acre (40 ha) property surrounded by the Blue Ridge Mountains. The brewery takes its name from the ridge named by Thomas Jefferson's father, who surveyed the Blue Ridge Mountains.

In 2016, Anheuser-Busch InBev acquired Devils Backbone Brewing Company.

== Locations ==
Devils Backbone operates two main breweries in Virginia: The Outpost Brewery & Tap Room, located in Lexington, Virginia, and Basecamp, located in Roseland, Virginia.

Select brews can also be found in Pennsylvania, West Virginia, North Carolina, Tennessee, Maryland, Washington, D.C., and Delaware. Since the purchase by Anheuser-Busch, the company has expanded into the markets of South Carolina, Georgia, Florida, Kentucky, Ohio, Pennsylvania, New Jersey, New York, and Tennessee.

== Beers ==
Devils Backbone produces approximately 128 different beers. In 2015, the company produced close to 62,000 barrels of beer. The following year, 75,000 barrels were produced. The beer is produced with a traditional German-style brewing system. Since 2016, the company began to release both the Vienna Lager and the Eight Point IPA in 12-ounce cans.

=== Vienna Lager ===
One of the most notable beers brewed by the company, Vienna Lager, was included in Men's Journal "Best 100 Beers in the World," and by Food & Wine "50 Best American Lagers." The lager took up nearly 60% of the company's volume in 2015.

==== Awards ====
- 2015 Great American Beer Festival - Gold
- 2012 Great American Beer Festival - Gold
- 2014 World Beer Cup Silver
- 2014 Virginia Craft Brewers Fest Gold

==== Eight Point IPA ====
The Eight Point IPA was the first beer that was brewed at Devils Backbone. The beer is among the company's Backbone Basecamp Favorites lineup.

==== Danzig ====
The Baltic-style porter has been brewed since 2009. It is one of the most popular beers in Devils Backbone Trail Blazers series. The porter has earned several awards.

===== Awards =====
- 2013 Great American Beer Festival - Bronze
- 2012 Great American Beer Festival - Silver
- 2010 World Beer Cup - Gold
- 2009 Great American Beer Festival - Silver

== List of beers brewed ==
| Name | Style | ABV |
|---|---|---|
| 16 Point | American Double/ Imperial IPA | 9.1 |
| 1887 Stout | American Stout | 7.2 |
| 319 Hebron Ale | American Pale Ale (APA) | 5.1 |
| 8.5 Barrel Stout | American Stout | 5.9 |
| Advantageous Weizenbock | Weizenbock | 6.8 |
| Agave Double Pils | American Double / Imperial Pilsner | 7.0 |
| Ale of Fergus | English Dark Mild Ale | 4.0 |
| Ale of Fergus Version 6.5 | Scottish Ale | 6.5 |
| Ale of Fergus Winter Warmer | Scottish Ale | 6.7 |
| Alpen Bock | Bock | 6.9 |
| Apple-achian Pie Stout | Herbed / Spiced Beer | 8.0 |
| Apricot Weiss | Hefeweizen | 5.3 |
| Auster Brau | Kolsch | 5.0 |
| Aviator | American Amber / Red Lager | 5.5 |
| Azreal | Belgium Strong Pale Ale | 7.0 |
| Back Packin | American Brown Ale | 6.2 |
| Baltic Coffee | Baltic Porter | 8.0 |
| Baracus | American Strong Ale | 9.6 |
| Barclay's London Dark Lager | Euro Dark Lager | 5.8 |
| Bavarian Dark Lager | Munich Dunkel Lager | 5.7 |
| Belgian Witbier | Witbier | 5.1 |
| Berliner Metro Weiss | Berliner Weissbier | 3.8 |
| Beta Max | American Double / Imperial IPA | 7.7 |
| Beyond All Raisins | American Barleywine | 10.6 |
| Bier De Noel | Belgian Dark Ale | 6.2 |
| Black Lager | Schwarzbier | 5.1 |
| Black Rock Oatmeal Stout | Oatmeal Stout | 4.5 |
| Blue Ridge Hope Revival Ale | American Brown Ale | 6.0 |
| Bravo Four Point Session IPA | American IPA | 4.4 |
| Cafe De Manana | American Porter | 6.7 |
| Catty Wompus | Belgian IPA | 7.5 |
| Cocoa Bear | American Double / Imperial Stout | 11.0 |
| Cocoa Danzig | Baltic Porter | 6.7 |
| Cocoa Schwartz | Schwartzbier | 5.1 |
| Crab Gose | Gose | 4.0 |
| Craic Stout | Irish Dry Stout | 4.6 |
| Cranberry Gose | Gose | 4.0 |
| Cross Eyed Stranger | American IPA | 7.8 |
| Cru Noir | Saison / Farmhouse Ale | 6.0 |
| Crystall Brett | Saison / Farmhouse Ale | 5.5 |
| Czech 10 | American Pale Lager | 4.3 |
| Danzig Baltic Porter | Baltic Porter | 8.0 |
| Dark Abby | Dubbel | 7.5 |
| Dead Bear Imperial Stout | American Double / Imperial Stout | 11.0 |
| Earned Run Ale | American Pale Ale (APA) | 4.2 |
| Eight Point IPA | American IPA | 6.2 |
| Five Apostles Saison | Saison / Farmhouse Ale | 6.9 |
| Flor De Luna | Belgian Pale Ale | 5.9 |
| Four Point Pale Ale | American Pale Ale (APA) | 4.0 |
| Ginger Brau | Euro Pale Lager | 4.5 |
| Glitter Bomb | American Wild Ale | 5.0 |
| Gold Leaf Lager | Munich Helles Lager | 4.5 |
| Granát | Polotmavé / Czech Half-dark Lager | 6.9 |
| Grill Marks | Kolsch | 3.0 |
| Hoopla | Baltic Porter | 9.5 |
| Ichabod Crandall | Pumpkin Ale | 5.1 |
| India Pale Lager | American Pale Lager | 6.1 |
| Inspirado | Saison / Farmhouse Ale | 7.3 |
| IPA (Wetherspoons) | American IPA | 5.5 |
| IPA Plus | American Double / Imperial IPA | 6.2 |
| Jarilo IPA | American IPA | 6.5 |
| Juniper IPA | American IPA | 8.2 |
| Just Joshin | Kolsch | 4.5 |
| Kabong | American Double / Imperial IPA | 11.1 |
| Kash's Kavern American Stout | American Stout | 5.6 |
| Kilt Flasher | Scotch Ale / Wee Heavy | 8.0 |
| Kung Pow! Enter The Hop | American IPA | 6.8 |
| Lemon-Ada | American Pale Ale (APA) | 5.2 |
| Mailbock | Mailbock / Helles Bock | 7.0 |
| March Forth | American Brown Ale | 4.6 |
| Meadow Bier | German Pilsener | 5.0 |
| Montpelier's Best Ambition Ale | American Amber / Red Ale | 5.4 |
| Morana | Tmavé/Czech Dark Lager | 5.6 |
| Morning Bear | American Stout | 11.0 |
| Morning Bear Imperial Coffee Stout | American Double / Imperial Stout | 10.5 |
| Neapolitans Stout | American Stout | 7.0 |
| New Fest | Marzen / Oktoberfest | 5.9 |
| No Problemo | Euro Dark Lager | 5.7 |
| O'Fest | Marzen / Oktoberfest | 5.8 |
| Old Glen | American Brown Ale | 7.8 |
| Oma's Apricot Jam | Dunkelweizen | 5.6 |
| Outpost Ale | English Brown Ale | 5.5 |
| Pear Lager | Fruit / Vegetable Beer | 4.4 |
| Pilot Brew Ale | American Pale Ale (APA) | 5.9 |
| Piwo Gwarski | Rauchbier | 3.6 |
| Pub Ale | English Pale Mild Ale | 4.8 |
| Pumpkin Hunter | Pumpkin Ale | 5.1 |
| Ramsey's Draft Stout | Irish Red Ale | 5.5 |
| Ramsey's Export Stout | Foreign / Export Stout | 6.8 |
| Reilly's Red Ale | Irish Red Ale | 5.5 |
| Reilly's Rye Ale | Rye Beer | 5.8 |
| Revenge Of The Mariner | American Barleywine | 13.1 |
| Shroomback Lager | American Pale Lager | 7.7 |
| Single Hop IPA | American IPA | 7.9 |
| Single Hop Strongpale Ale | American Pale Ale (APA) | 6.4 |
| Sixteen Point Imperial IPA | American Double / Imperial IPA | 9.1 |
| Sixth Circle (collab W Parkway Brewing) | American IPA | 5.7 |
| Skull Crushing Ape | Weizenbock | 8.0 |
| Smokehaus Rauchbier | Rauchbier | 5.3 |
| Smokehouse Porter | Smoked Beer | 5.7 |
| Space Fruit Pale Ale | American Pale Ale (APA) | 4.6 |
| Spider Bite | American Black Ale | 4.2 |
| Stringduster | American Pale Ale (APA) | 4.4 |
| Striped Bass Pale Ale | American Pale Ale (APA) | 5.0 |
| Sugar Plum | Fruit / Vegetable Beer | 7.8 |
| Summer Haze | Herbed / Spiced Beer | 4.4 |
| Tag Out IPL | American Pale Lager | 4.2 |
| Tectonic Barleywine | American Barleywine | 11.6 |
| Ten Point IPA | American Double / Imperial IPA | 7.8 |
| The Keeler | American Blonde Ale | 4.2 |
| Three Ridges Belgian Style Triple | Tripel | 8.5 |
| Tides De Mars | Biere de Garde | 6.1 |
| Tommy Two Fists | Dortmunder / Export Lager | 5.7 |
| Trail Angel Weiss | Hefeweizen | 4.7 |
| Trail Angel Weissbier | Hefeweizen | 4.7 |
| Trailblazer | Imperial IPA | 9.1 |
| Treadwell IPLA | American Pale Lager | 7.5 |
| Tropical Thunder | Kristalweizen | 5.3 |
| Trukker Pils | Czech Pilsener | 5.0 |
| Turbo Cougar | Mailbock / Helles Bock | 6.8 |
| Twelve Point IPA | American Double / Imperial IPA | 8.3 |
| Tye Porter | American Porter | 6.0 |
| UK IPA | English India Pale Ale (IPA) | 6.7 |
| Vienna Lager | Vienna Lager | 5.2 |
| Vision Quest Southwest Lager | American Pale Lager | 7.1 |
| Wintergreen Weiss | Hefeweizen | 4.7 |
| Wood Aged Dark Abby | Dubbel | 6.8 |
| Wood Aged Kilt Flasher | Scotch Ale / Wee Heavy | 7.6 |
| Yakima Hop Fight | American Double / Imperial IPA | 8.4 |

== Awards ==
Since opening in 2008, the company has won 28 medals at the Great American Beer Festival in Denver, Colorado.

=== National Titles ===
==== The Great American Beer Festival ====
- 2014 Great American Beer Festival Mid-Size Brewery & Brewery Team
- 2013 Small Brewing Company & Small Brewing Company Team
- 2012 Small Brewpub & Small Brewpub Brewer
- 2010 World Beer Cup Champion Brewery
- Virginia Craft Brewers Fest Best of Show Medals: 2015, 2014, 2013 & 2012

==== World Beer Cup ====
- 2016 Won a Gold Award in the German-Style Schwarzbier category
- 2016 Won a Gold Award in the Irish-Style Red Ale
