= Midway, Virginia =

Midway, Virginia may refer to:

- Midway, Albemarle County, Virginia
- Midway, Charlottesville
- Midway, Giles County, Virginia
- Midway, Halifax County, Virginia (disambiguation)
  - Midway (near Scottsburg), Halifax County, Virginia
- Midway, King William County, Virginia
- Midway, Mecklenburg County, Virginia
- Midway, Washington County, Virginia
- Steeles Tavern, Virginia, formerly Midway
- Wren, Virginia, formerly Midway
- Midway (Millington, Virginia), a historic home

== See also ==
- Midway Heights, Virginia
- Midway Island, Virginia
- Midway Mills, Virginia
