= Virginia State Route 20 =

State highway in central Virginia, US

State Route 20

Route information
- Maintained by VDOT
- Length: 89.79 mi (144.50 km)
- Existed: July 1, 1933–present
- Tourist routes: Journey Through Hallowed Ground Byway; Virginia Byway

Major junctions
- South end: US 15 / SR 1003 in Dillwyn
- SR 6 in Scottsville; SR 53 near Charlottesville; I-64 near Charlottesville; US 250 in Charlottesville; US 33 in Barboursville; SR 231 near Somerset; US 15 in Orange; US 522 near Unionville
- North end: SR 3 in Wilderness

Location
- Country: United States
- State: Virginia
- Counties: Buckingham, Albemarle, City of Charlottesville, Orange

Highway system
- Virginia Routes; Interstate; US; Primary; Secondary; Byways; History; HOT lanes
← US 19	→ US 21

State Route 20 (SR 20) is a primary state highway in the U.S. state of Virginia. The state highway runs 89.79 miles (144.50 km) from U.S. Route 15 (US 15) in Dillwyn north to SR 3 in Wilderness. SR 20 is a C-shaped route that connects Charlottesville with Farmville (via US 15) in Southside Virginia. The state highway also links Charlottesville to Fredericksburg (via SR 3) by way of Orange County, within which SR 20 is the main east–west highway and intersects US 15 again in the county seat of Orange.

SR 20 is a Virginia Byway from Scottsville to Orange.

== Route description ==
SR 20 begins at an intersection with US 15 (James Madison Highway) just west of the town of Dillwyn. The state highway heads north as the two-lane undivided Constitution Route, which passes through the hamlet of Allenslevel, the site of Buckingham Correctional Center. SR 20 crosses the Slate River and passes through the community of Centenary on its way through northwestern Buckingham County to its crossing of the James River. On the north side of the bridge, the state highway enters the town of Scottsville, through which the highway passes as Valley Street. SR 20 meets SR 6 (Main Street) in the center of town. The two highways run together to the north end of town where SR 6 splits west as Irish Road.

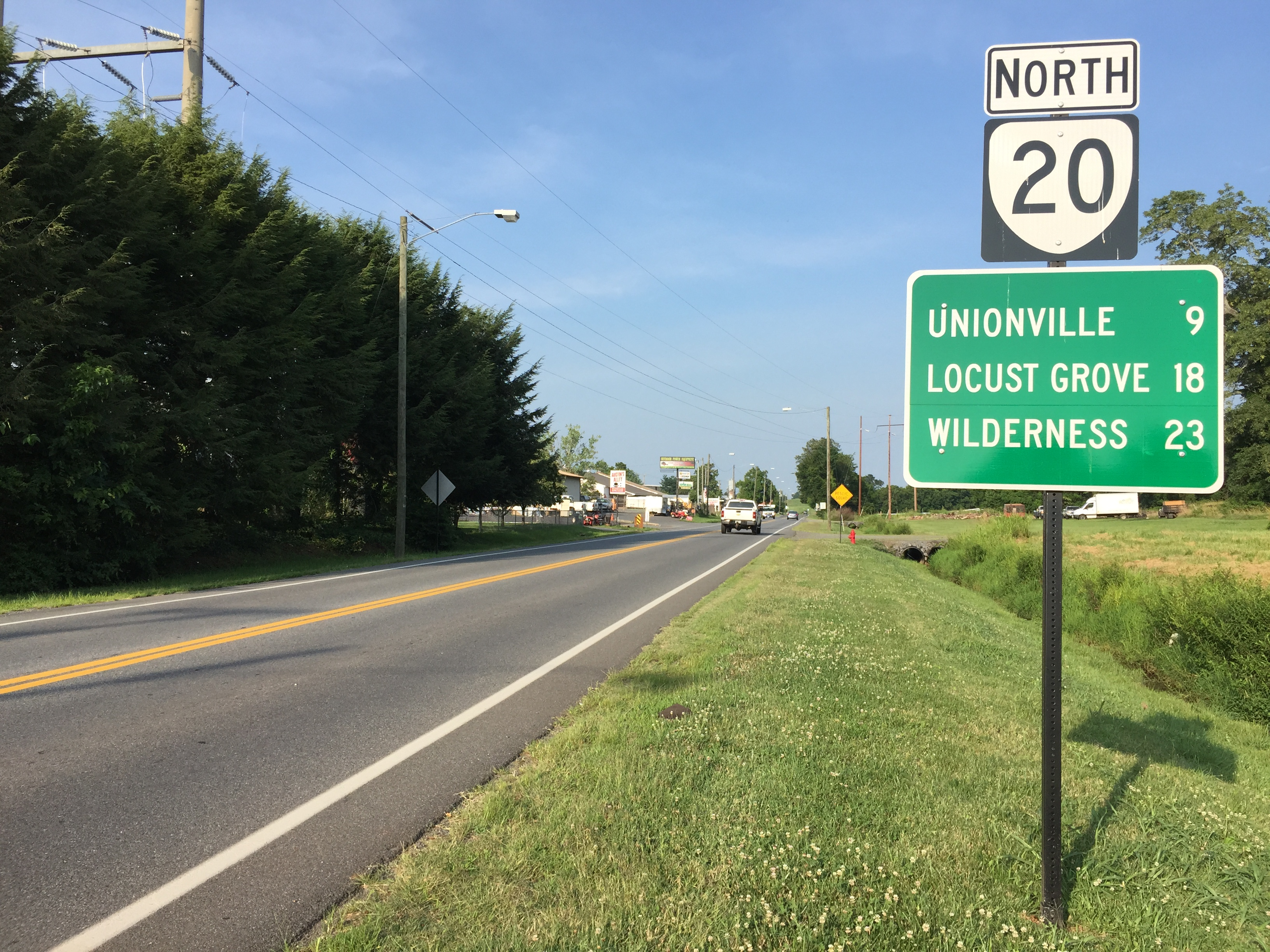
View north along SR 20 past US 15 in Orange

SR 20 continues through southern Albemarle County as Scottsville Road. The state highway heads through Glendower, where the highway passes close to the historical presidential retreat Pine Knot and Christ Church Glendower. North of Keene, SR 20 crosses the Hardware River as the watercourse and the highway passes through a gap between Green Mountain and Carters Mountain, which are part of the Southwest Mountains. The state highway follows the west side of the latter mountain to the community of Mill Creek, where the highway expands to a four-lane divided highway at its intersection with SR 53 (Thomas Jefferson Parkway). SR 53 provides access to Thomas Jefferson and James Monroe's respective estates of Monticello and Ash Lawn–Highland. SR 20 passes the entrance to Piedmont Virginia Community College just south of its partial cloverleaf interchange with Interstate 64.

SR 20 becomes Monticello Avenue on crossing Moores Creek into the city of Charlottesville. The street reduces to a two-lane undivided road and curves west to Avon Street, onto which the state highway turns north. At Garrett Street, SR 20 continues onto four-lane divided 9th Street, which crosses over CSX's Piedmont Subdivision into downtown Charlottesville. The state highway passes to the east of the Downtown Mall and meets US 250 Business, which heads eastbound along Market Street and westbound along High Street, which are both two-way streets. The business route joins SR 20 in a concurrency on High Street, which passes by the former Martha Jefferson Hospital. US 250 Business reaches its eastern terminus at US 250 (Long Street). SR 20 turns east onto US 250 to cross the Free Bridge over the Rivanna River to leave the city limits.

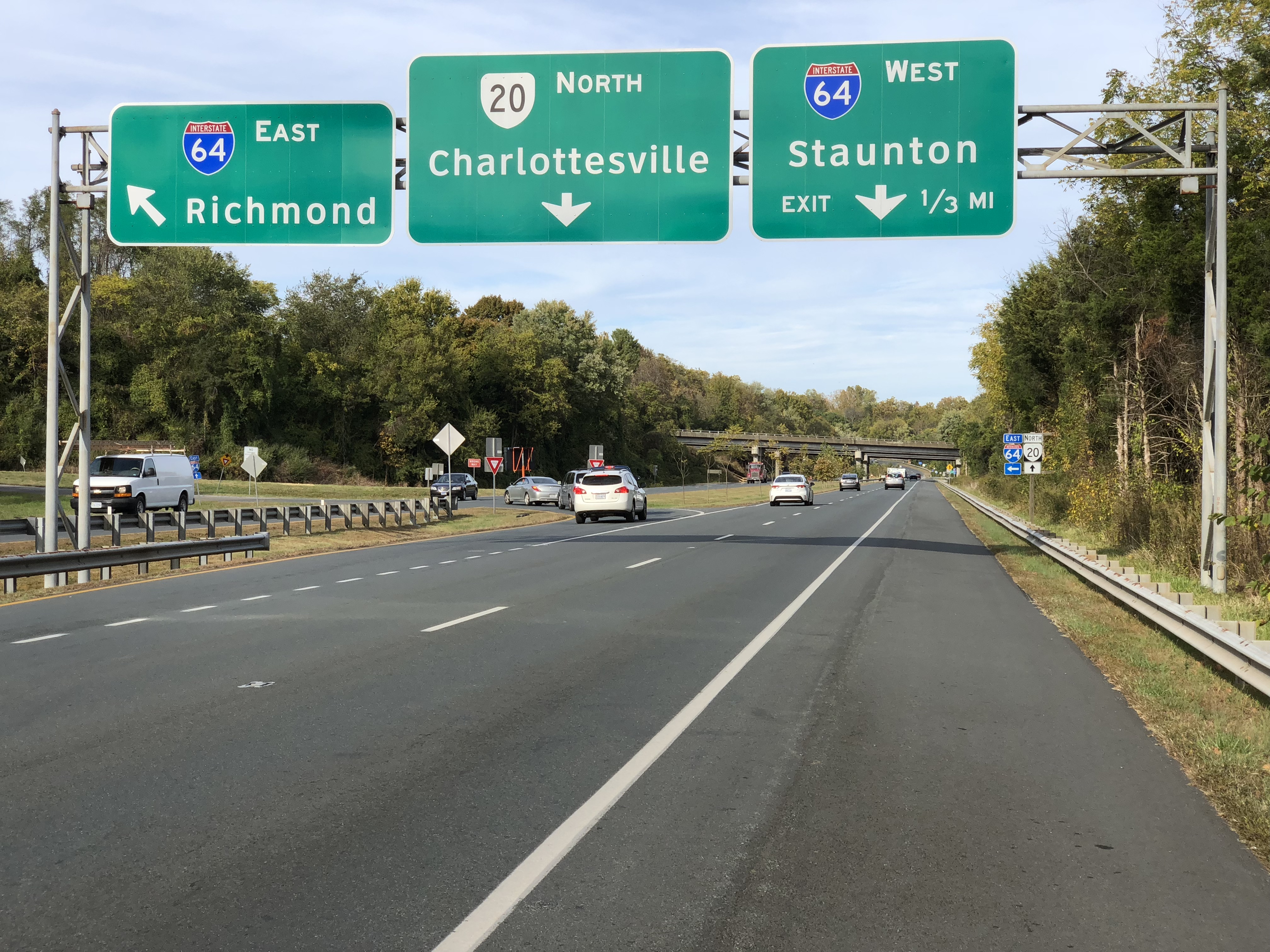
SR 20 northbound at I-64 just south of Charlottesville

SR 20 heads north from the Charlottesville vicinity along Stony Point Road, which parallels the west flank of the Southwest Mountains. The state highway passes the communities of Key West, Eastham, Stony Point, and Rosena. SR 20 enters Orange County and its name changes to Constitution Highway south of Barboursville, which contains the ruins of the namesake estate. The state highway has a short concurrency with US 33 (Spotswood Trail) in which the highways pass under Norfolk Southern Railway's Washington District. SR 20 heads northeast and intersects SR 231 (Blue Ridge Turnpike) north of Somerset. The state highway continues east and closely parallels the railroad through Montpelier Station, which is named for James Madison's estate Montpelier on the south side of the tracks.

SR 20 continues east to the town of Orange, where the highway enters town as Main Street. At the Holladay House, the state highway turns south onto Caroline Street while Main Street continues east SR 20 Business. SR 20 passes the James Madison Museum before US 15 (Madison Street) joins the highway in a concurrency to pass under the Washington District rail line after the counties sole remaining tractor crossing. The state highway turns east onto Berry Hill Road and passes under another Norfolk Southern rail line before receiving the other end of SR 20 Business (Byrd Street). SR 20 becomes Constitution Highway again on leaving the town of Orange. The state highway passes Orange County Airport and intersects US 522 (Zachary Taylor Highway) between Unionville and Rhoadesville. SR 20 briefly passes through part of Fredericksburg and Spotsylvania National Military Park near the site of the Battle of the Wilderness before reaching its northern terminus at SR 3 (Germanna Highway) in the community of Locust Grove just west of the Spotsylvania County line.

== History ==
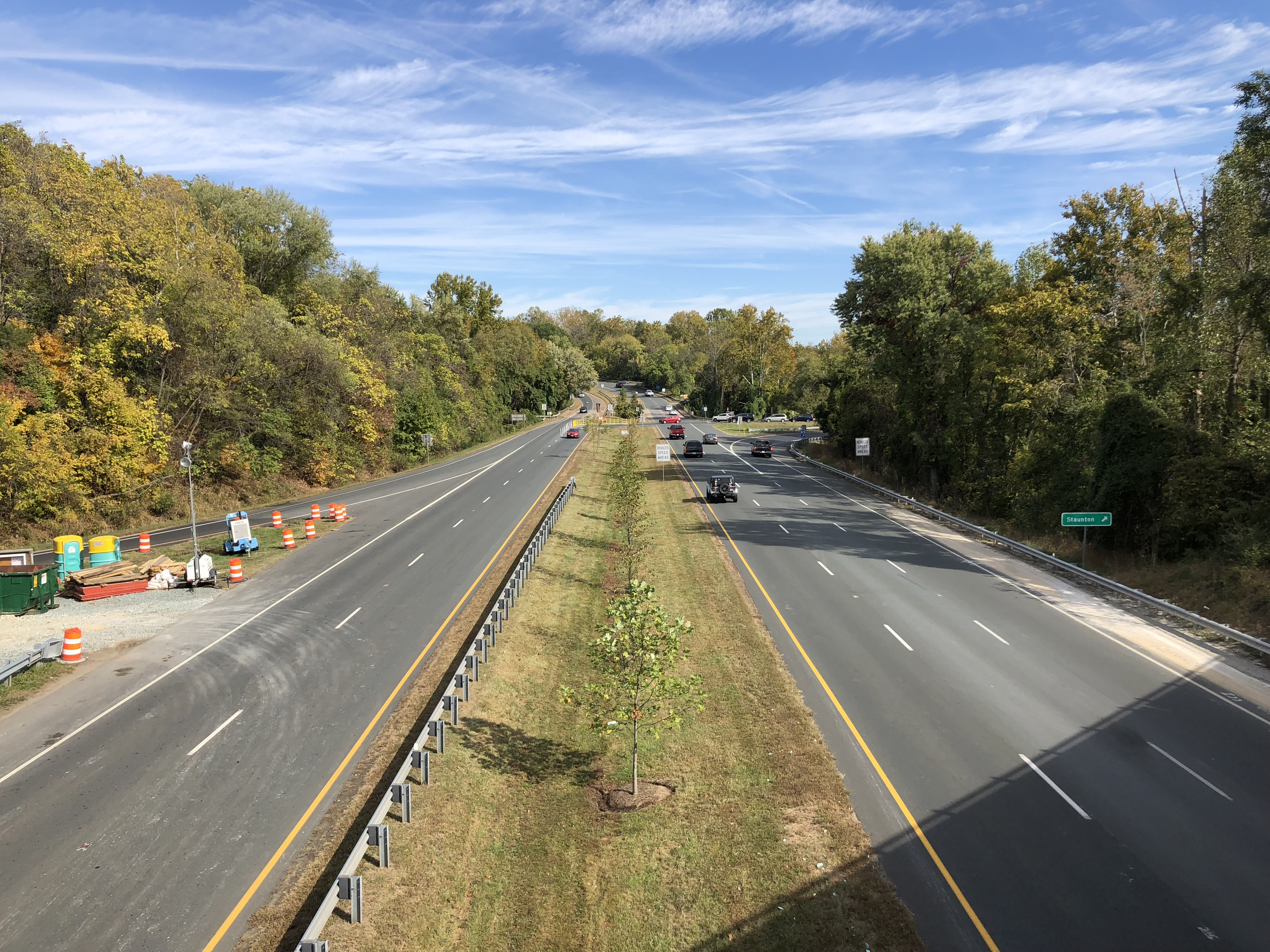
SR 20 northbound entering Charlottesville

SR 20 was first created in 1933 with the renumbering of SR 316 between US 15 in Dillwyn and SR 6 in Scottsville and a separate section to the north that replaced SR 702 between SR 231 in Somerset and SR 3 in Wilderness. In 1941, the southern section was extended north from SR 6 to US 250 in Charlottesville, and the northern section was extended south from SR 231 to US 33 in Barboursville. In 1950, the two sections of SR 20 were finally connected via a replacement of SR 613 between Charlottesville and Barboursville.

In May 2019, the intersection of SR 20 and I-64 was changed. Travelers exiting I-64 west and turning left onto SR 20 south now have a dedicated lane to turn into. As a result, travelers only have to cross SR 20 north and then merge with SR 20 south.

== Future ==
Two new roundabouts have been approved to be implemented along SR 20. The first would be at the intersection of SR 20 and SR 231 in Somerset. Construction is expected to begin in 2020. The second roundabout would be at the intersection of SR 20 and US 33 just south of Barboursville. This project might also include reconstruction of the intersection of SR 738 and US 33, just south of the SR 20/US 33 intersection. Funding has been approved, but no dates for construction completion have been announced.

== Major intersections ==
County	Location	mi	km	Destinations	Notes
Buckingham		0.00	0.00	US 15 (North James Madison Highway) / SR 1003 (Main Street) – Dillwyn, Farmville	Southern terminus
Albemarle	Scottsville	19.34	31.12	SR 6 east (Main Street) – Richmond	South end of concurrency with SR 6
Albemarle	Scottsville	19.92	32.06	SR 6 west (Irish Road) to US 29	North end of concurrency with SR 6
Albemarle		36.81	59.24	SR 53 east (Thomas Jefferson Parkway) – Palmyra, Monticello, Michie Tavern, Ash Lawn-Highland	Western terminus of SR 53
Albemarle		37.23	59.92	I-64 – Staunton, Richmond	I-64 exit 121
City of Charlottesville		39.01	62.78	US 250 Bus. west (East High Street)	South end of concurrency with US 250 Business
City of Charlottesville		39.90	64.21	US 250 west (Long Street)	North end of concurrency with US 250 Business; south end of concurrency with US 250
Albemarle	Pantops	40.16	64.63	US 250 east (Richmond Road) / SR 1116 south (River Bend Drive) to I-64 – Shadwell, Richmond, Monticello, Ash Lawn, Michie Tavern	North end of concurrency with US 250
Orange	Barboursville	55.01	88.53	US 33 east (Spotswood Trail) – Gordonsville, Richmond	South end of concurrency with US 33
Orange	Barboursville	55.23	88.88	US 33 west (Spotswood Trail) – Ruckersville, Harrisonburg	North end of concurrency with US 33
Orange	Old Somerset	60.86	97.94	SR 231 (Blue Ridge Turnpike) – Madison, Gordonsville	
Orange	Orange	67.09	107.97	SR 20 Bus. north (Main Street)	
Orange	Orange	67.24	108.21	US 15 north (Madison Street) – Culpeper	South end of concurrency with US 15
Orange	Orange	67.41	108.49	US 15 south (Caroline Street) – Gordonsville	North end of concurrency with US 15
Orange	Orange	68.07	109.55	SR 20 Bus. south (Byrd Street)	
Orange	Unionville	76.40	122.95	US 522 (Zachary Taylor Highway) – Culpeper, Mineral	
Orange	Wilderness	89.79	144.50	SR 3 (Germanna Highway) – Culpeper, Fredericksburg	Northern terminus
1.000 mi = 1.609 km; 1.000 km = 0.621 mi: Concurrency terminus

== Orange business route ==
State Route 20 Business
- Location: Orange
- Length: 0.71 mi (1,140 m)

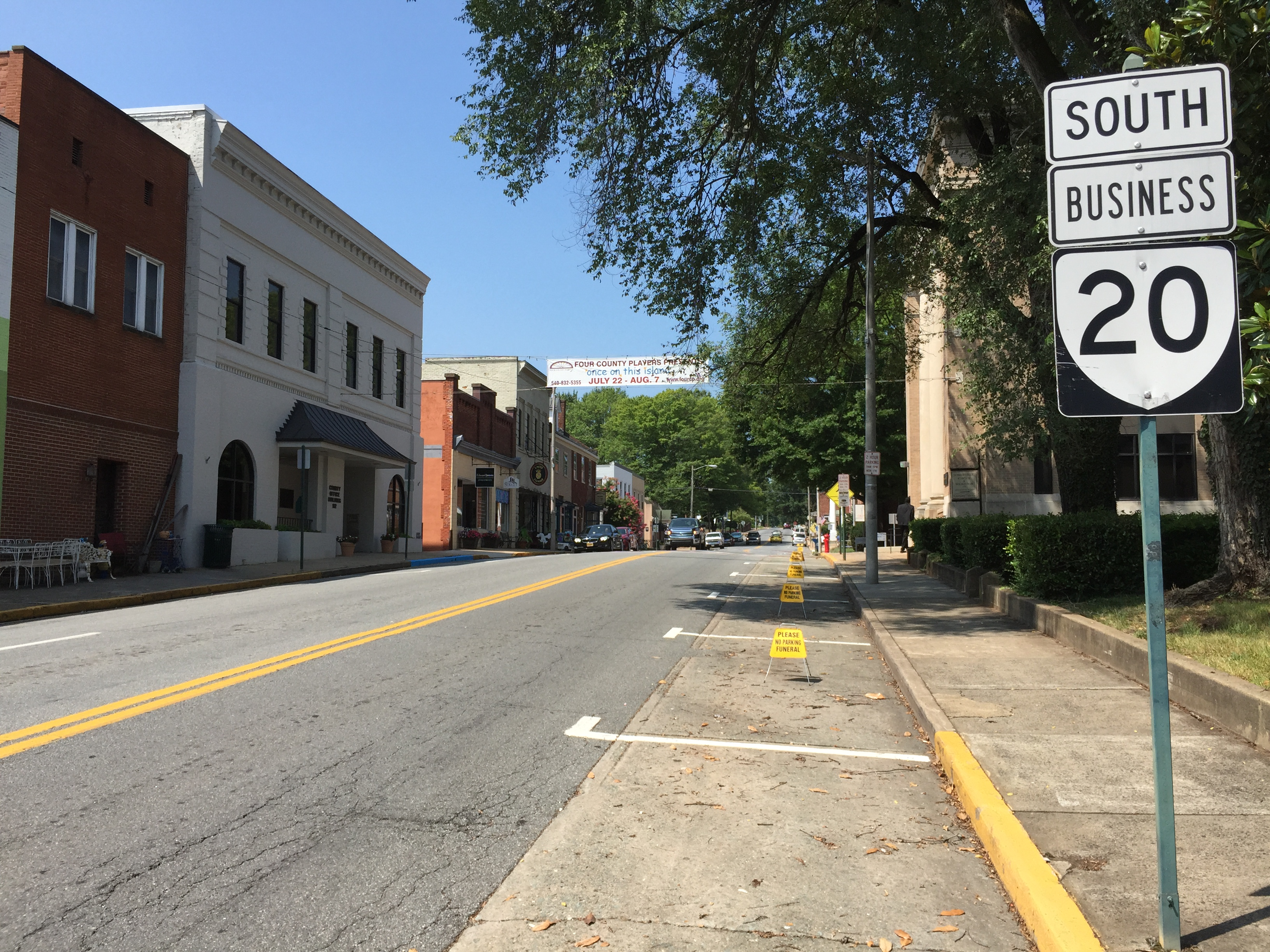
View south along SR 20 Bus. south of US 15 in Orange

SR 20 Business is a business route of SR 20 in the town of Orange. The business route runs 0.71 miles (1.14 km) between intersections with SR 20 on either side of town. SR 20 Business begins as Main Street where SR 20 turns south onto Caroline Street next to the Holladay House. The business route intersects US 15 (Madison Street) and meets Norfolk Southern Railway's Washington District at grade. SR 20 Business turns southeast onto Byrd Street to rejoin SR 20 on a tangent.

< SR 373	Spurs of SR 37; 1923–1928	SR 375 >
< SR 315	District 3 State Routes; 1928–1933	SR 317 >
< SR 701	District 7 State Routes; 1928–1933	SR 703 >
