= Bud Thomas (pitcher) =

American baseball player (1910–2001)

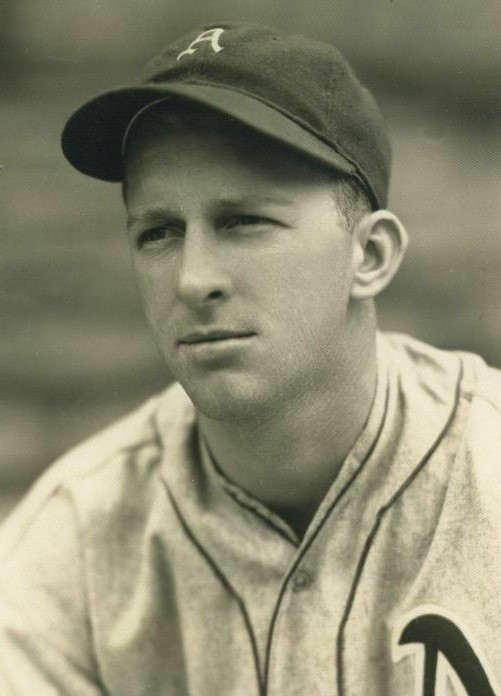
- Pitcher
- Born: September 9, 1910; Alberene, Virginia
- Died: May 20, 2001 (aged 90); North Garden, Virginia
- Batted: Right Threw: Right

MLB debut
- September 13, 1932, for the Washington Senators

Last MLB appearance
- September 27, 1941, for the Detroit Tigers

MLB statistics
- Win–loss record: 25-34
- Earned run average: 4.96
- Strikeouts: 135
- Stats at Baseball Reference

Teams
- Washington Senators (1932–1933, 1939); Philadelphia Athletics (1937–1938, 1939); Detroit Tigers (1939–1941)

Luther Baxter "Bud" Thomas (September 9, 1910 – May 20, 2001), was an American professional baseball pitcher. He played in Major League Baseball (MLB) for the Washington Senators, Philadelphia Athletics, and Detroit Tigers.

== Biography ==
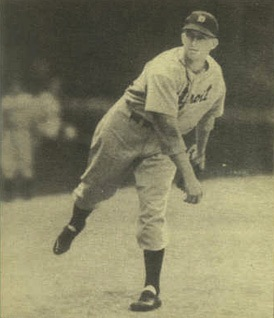
Thomas' 1940 Bowman Gum card

He was born in Faber, Virginia and died in North Garden, Virginia. On April 23, 1939, Thomas surrendered the first major League home run ever hit by Red Sox legend Ted Williams. Thomas pitched to Babe Ruth twice, striking him out the second time.

Although posting only a .120 batting average (18-for-150) in 143 games, Thomas was good defensively. He recorded a .984 fielding percentage with only two errors in 122 total chances in 526 innings pitched.
