= Robert Michie =

United States Army general

Robert Edward Lee Michie
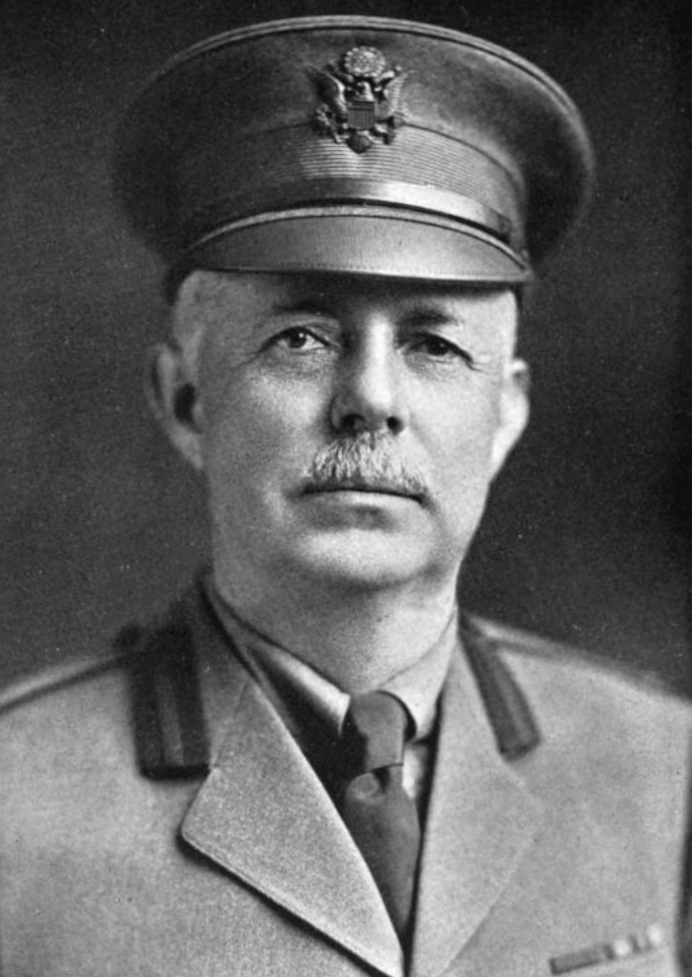
- Born: June 1, 1864; Bellair, Virginia
- Died: June 4, 1918 (aged 54); Rouen, France
- Burial place: Suresnes American Cemetery and Memorial
- Military career
- Allegiance: United States
- Branch: United States Army
- Service years: 1885–1918
- Rank: Major General
- Commands: 53rd Infantry Brigade
- Conflicts: Spanish–American War; World War I

Major General Robert Edward Lee Michie (June 1, 1864 – June 4, 1918) was a U.S. Army general.

== Early life ==
Michie was born in Bellair, Virginia, in Albemarle County on June 1, 1864, to Dr. J. Augustus Michie and Susan Jackson Michie. He graduated number twenty-six of thirty-nine from the United States Military Academy at West Point, New York, in June 1885, which he entered in September 1881. Among his classmates included several officers who would become future general officers, such as Beaumont B. Buck, Joseph E. Kuhn, Henry P. McCain, Robert Lee Bullard, George W. Burr, John D. Barrette, John M. Carson Jr., Robert A. Brown, Charles H. Muir, William F. Martin, Daniel B. Devore and Willard A. Holbrook.

Upon graduation he received a commission as a second lieutenant in the Cavalry Branch of the United States Army.

== Military career ==
During the Spanish–American War, Michie served as a major, U.S. Volunteers, from 1898 to 1899. He also served in the Adjutant General's Department in Havana and in Pinar del Rio, Cuba. From 1900 to 1901, he was the adjutant general, Department of the Missouri (River) and from 1903 to 1904 he was in the Philippines.

He served with the General Staff from 1904 to 1917. Michie returned to Washington for duty with the General Staff, and also was sent as an observer of the German Army Maneuvers of 1908.

His travels continued in 1917, when he went with a special United States commission to Russia. Michie was promoted to brigadier general (NA) on August 5, 1917, and was assigned to command the 53rd Infantry Brigade, a unit of the 27th Division, at Camp Wadsworth, South Carolina, near Spartanburg. He took it to France with the American Expeditionary Forces in 1918; he died there at the age of 54 on June 4, 1918.

Michie was buried at Suresnes American Cemetery and Memorial.

== Personal life ==
Michie married Gray Beachy on January 19, 1887.
