= Rose Hill, Virginia =

Rose Hill is the name of some places in the U.S. state of Virginia:

- Rose Hill, Albemarle County, Virginia
- Rose Hill, Fairfax County, Virginia
- Rose Hill, Lee County, Virginia
- Rose Hill, Rappahannock County, Virginia
