= Rivanna, Virginia =

Rivanna
- CDP
- Location of the Rivanna CDP within the Albemarle County

- Location within the Commonwealth of Virginia
- Coordinates: 37°59′43″N 78°22′44″W
- Country: United States
- State: Virginia
- County: Albemarle

Population (2020)
  - Total: 2,174
- Time zone: UTC−5 (Eastern (EST))
  - Summer (DST): UTC−4 (EDT)
- ZIP codes: 22947
- FIPS code: 51-67331
- GNIS feature ID: 2584909

Rivanna is a census-designated place (CDP) in Albemarle County, Virginia, United States, just east of Shadwell. As of the 2020 census, Rivanna had a population of 2,174. It consists mainly of the Glenmore gated community.

== Demographics ==
Historical population
Census	Pop.	Note	%±
2010	1,860		—
2020	2,174		16.9%
U.S. Decennial Census; 2010 2020

Rivanna was first listed as a census designated place in the 2010 U.S. census.
