= James Cabell =

James Cabell may refer to:

- James Branch Cabell (1879–1958), American author
- James Lawrence Cabell (1813–1889), American sanitarian and author
