= Woodbrook =

Woodbrook may refer to:

Buildings and other structures

- Woodbrook Golf Club, a golf club in Bray, County Wicklow, Republic of Ireland
- Woodbrook House, a house in the parish of Tumna, County Roscommon, Republic of Ireland
- Woodbrook railway station, County Wicklow, Ireland

Places

- Woodbrook, Port of Spain, Trinidad and Tobago
- Woodbrook, Baltimore, a neighborhood in the city of Baltimore, Maryland, that looks over Druid Hill Park
- Woodbrook, County Tyrone, a townland in County Tyrone, Northern Ireland
- Woodbrook, County Wexford, a place in County Wexford, Republic of Ireland
- Woodbrook, Delaware, an unincorporated community in New Castle County, Delaware, United States
- Woodbrook, Virginia, an unincorporated community in Albemarle County, Virginia, United States

Schools

- Woodbrook School, an elementary school in Edison, New Jersey, United States
- Woodbrook Vale School, a secondary school in Loughborough, England

Other

- Cochrane baronets, of Woodbrook, Cavan, Ireland
- Woodbrook (racehorse), Grand National winner in 1881
- Hamilton baronets, of Woodbrook (1814)
  - Sir John Hamilton, 1st Baronet, of Woodbrook

== See also ==
- Woodbrooke Quaker Study Centre
