= Tapscott =

Tapscott is a surname. Notable people with the surname include:

- Derek Tapscott (1932–2008), Welsh former professional footballer and Wales international
- Don Tapscott (born 1947), Canadian business executive, author, consultant and speaker
- Ed Tapscott, the former interim head coach of the NBA's Washington Wizards
- George Tapscott (1889–1940), South African cricketer who played in one Test in 1913
- Horace Tapscott (1934–1999), American jazz pianist and composer
- John E. Tapscott (1930–2017), American businessman and politician
- Lionel Tapscott (1894–1934), South African cricketer who played in 2 Tests in 1923
- Luke Tapscott (born 1991), Australian rules footballer for the Melbourne Football Club

== See also ==
- Tapscott, Virginia, unincorporated community in Albemarle County, Virginia
- Tup Scott
