= Eheart =

Eheart may refer to:

== People ==
- Red Skelton (Richard Bernard Eheart, 1913–1997), American entertainer
- Brenda Krause Eheart, Heinz Awards winner 2008
- Diane Eheart, after whom minor planet 21520 Dianaeheart is named

== Other uses ==
- Eheart, Virginia, a place in Orange County, Virginia, United States
- eHeart, an electrocardiography study

== See also ==
- Ehart (disambiguation)
