= Clover Hill, Virginia =

Clover Hill, Virginia may refer to:

- Clover Hill, the former name for Appomattox Court House
- Clover Hill, Rockingham County, Virginia
- Clover Hill, Albemarle County, Virginia
- Clover Hill, Chesterfield County, Virginia
  - Clover Hill High School
  - Clover Hill Railroad
