= Willoughby, Virginia =

Willoughby may refer to:

- Willoughby, Albemarle County, Virginia, an unincorporated community
- Willoughby Spit, a neighborhood in Norfolk
