= Cocke's Mill House and Mill Site =

Historic house in Virginia, United States

- U.S. National Register of Historic Places
- Virginia Landmarks Register
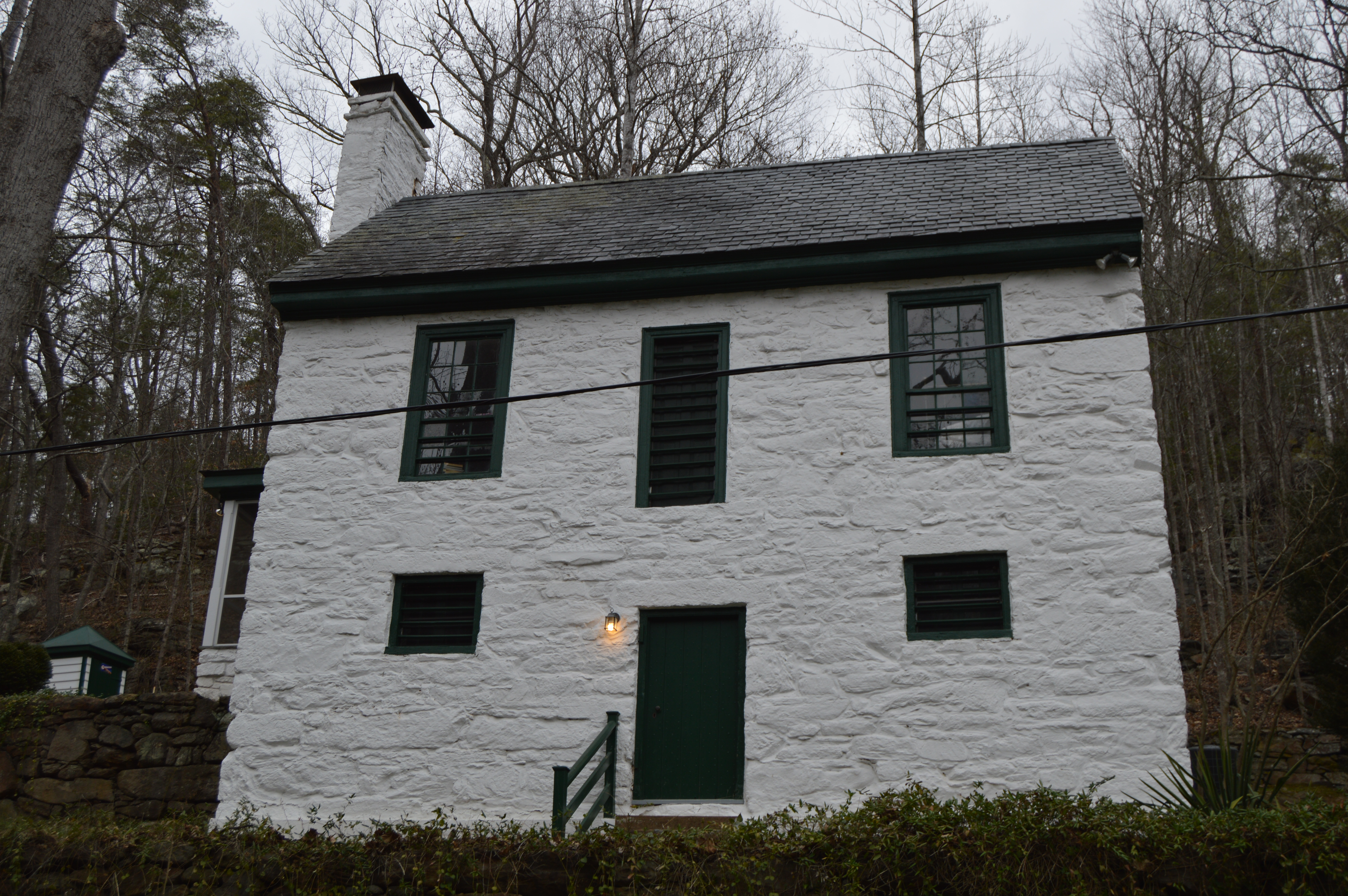
- Front of the house

- Location within Virginia Location within the United States
- Location: VA 712 north of junction with VA 719, near North Garden, Virginia
- Coordinates: 37°54′28″N 78°37′00″W
- Area: 13 acres (5.3 ha)
- Architectural style: Colonial
- NRHP reference No.: 90001828
- VLR No.: 002-0186

Significant dates
- Added to NRHP: December 6, 1990
- Designated VLR: August 15, 1989

Cocke's Mill House and Mill Site, also known as Coles' Mill and Johnston's Mill, is a historic home located near North Garden, Albemarle County, Virginia. The miller's house was built in about 1820, and is a 1½ story, three-bay, gable-roofed stone cottage built on a high basement. A one-story frame addition was built in 1989. Located on the property are the stone foundations of Cocke's Mill, built about 1792. It was originally two stories high with dimensions of 51 feet by 40 feet, and the stone walls of the original mill and tail race. The mill remained in use into the 1930s, and burned sometime in the 1940s.

It was added to the National Register of Historic Places in 1990.
