= Old Dominion, Virginia =

Unincorporated community in Virginia, United States

Old Dominion
- Unincorporated community
- Location within the state of Virginia Old Dominion (the United States)
- Coordinates: 37°49′40″N 78°39′58″W
- Country: United States
- State: Virginia
- County: Albemarle
- Time zone: UTC−5 (Eastern (EST))
  - Summer (DST): UTC−4 (EDT)
- GNIS feature ID: 1499819

Old Dominion is an unincorporated community in Albemarle County, Virginia, United States. Its elevation is 535 feet (163 m).
