= Heards, Virginia =

Unincorporated community in Virginia, United States

Heards
- Unincorporated community
- Location within the Commonwealth of Virginia Heards (the United States)
- Coordinates: 37°55′13″N 78°45′13″W
- Country: United States
- State: Virginia
- County: Albemarle
- Time zone: UTC−5 (Eastern (EST))
  - Summer (DST): UTC−4 (EDT)
- GNIS feature ID: 1495672

Heards is an unincorporated community in Albemarle County, Virginia, United States. State Route 633 passes through the hamlet of Heards and connects to Ottoway in the west.
