= James Lawrence Cabell =

American sanitarian and author

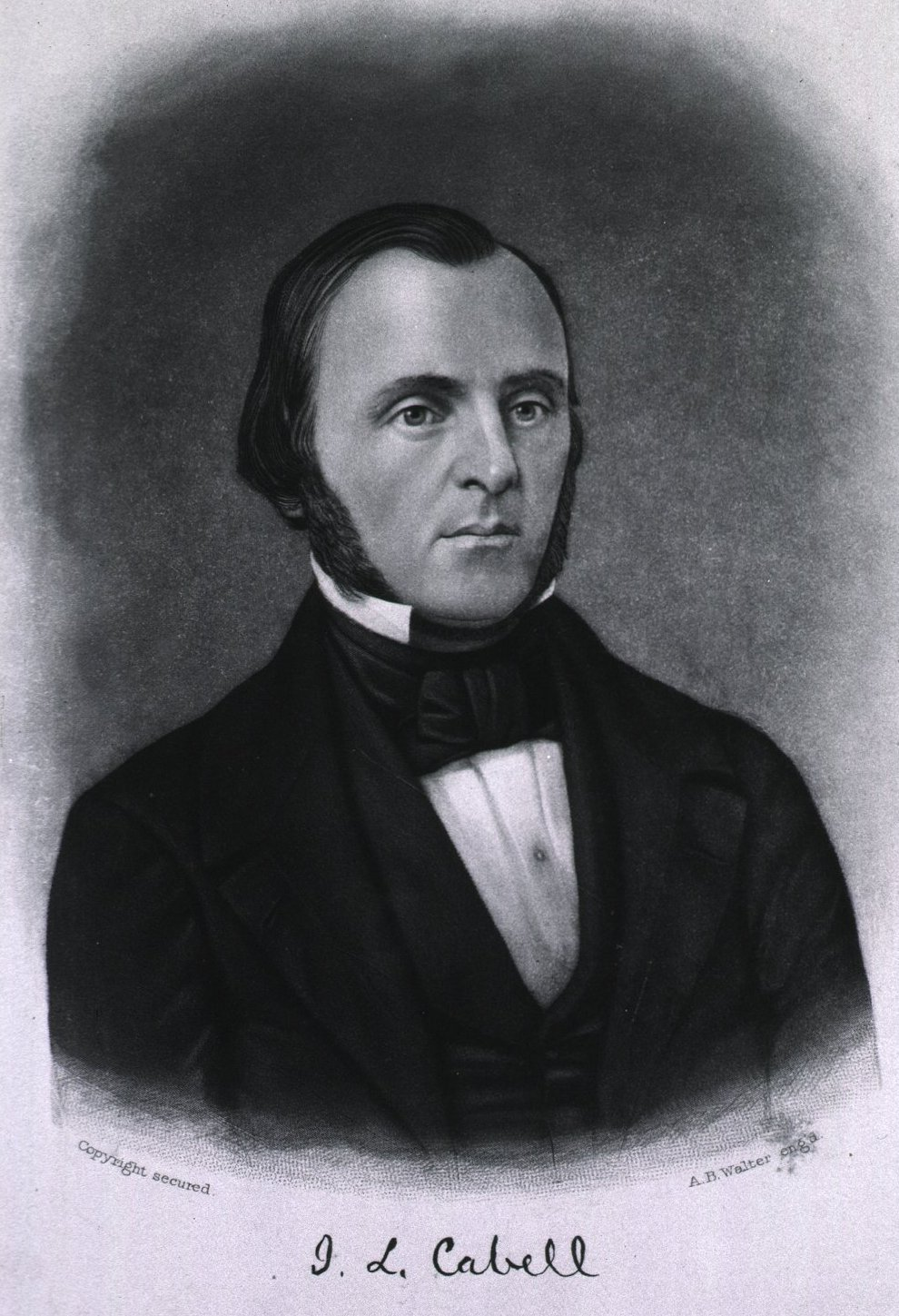
- Born: August 26, 1813; Nelson County, Virginia
- Died: August 13, 1889 (aged 75)
- Occupation(s): Doctor, author

Dr. James Lawrence Cabell (August 26, 1813 – August 13, 1889) was an American sanitarian and author.

== Life ==
He was born in Nelson County, Virginia, the son of Dr. George Cabell, Jr., and graduated from the University of Virginia in 1833. He then studied medicine in Baltimore, Philadelphia and Paris, and became Professor of Anatomy and Surgery at the University of Virginia, where he was chairman of the faculty in 1846 and 1847. Cabell was a full professor at the School of Medicine for 52 years (1842-1889) and was an early pioneer of the sanitary preparation of the surgical patient following Lister's principles.

He was in charge of the Confederate military hospitals during the Civil War. When yellow fever broke out in Memphis, Tennessee he was appointed chairman of the National Sanitary Conference and devised a plan that checked the spread of the epidemic.

In 1859, he published “The Testimony of Modern Science to the Unity of Mankind”. This work advanced the idea of evolution one year before publication of Darwin's “Origin of Species.” Cabell founded the National Board of Health which in 1880 became the U.S. Public Health Service. From 1879 until his death in Overton, Virginia, he was president of the National Board of Health.

== Works ==
He wrote The Testimony of Modern Science to the Unity of Mankind (New York, 1858).
