= Berkmar, Virginia =

Unincorporated community in Virginia, United States

Berkmar
- Unincorporated community
- Location within the state of Virginia Berkmar (the United States)
- Coordinates: 38°04′52″N 78°28′42″W
- Country: United States
- State: Virginia
- County: Albemarle
- Time zone: UTC−5 (Eastern (EST))
  - Summer (DST): UTC−4 (EDT)
- GNIS feature ID: 1675190

Berkmar is an unincorporated community in Albemarle County, Virginia, United States. Berkmar is located in central Virginia, in north-west Albemarle County.
