= Ehart =

Ehart may refer to:

- Phil Ehart (born 1951), American drummer
- Ehart, Virginia, a place in the United States

== See also ==
- Eheart (disambiguation)
- E. Hart Fenn (1856–1939), American newspaperman and politician
- Ezekiel Hart (1770–1843), entrepreneur and politician in British North America
