= Rosena, Virginia =

Unincorporated community in Virginia, United States

Rosena
- Unincorporated community
- Location within the Commonwealth of Virginia Rosena (the United States)
- Coordinates: 38°06′55″N 78°20′49″W
- Country: United States
- State: Virginia
- County: Albemarle
- Time zone: UTC−5 (Eastern (EST))
  - Summer (DST): UTC−4 (EDT)
- GNIS feature ID: 1675370

Rosena is an unincorporated community in Albemarle County, Virginia, United States. It lies at the intersection of Rt. 20 and Rt. 640, within the Stony Point community. The sole service is a single general store, "Stony Point Market," which long did business under the name of "Bobbi's" and, before that, "Bell's Store." As of 1904, the United States Geological Survey designated it as a "post village," indicating that at that time there was a post office. And as of 1910, the population was great enough to warrant a stop by the "traveling library stations" of the Virginia State Library.
