= Redland, Virginia =

Unincorporated community in Virginia, United States

Redland
- Unincorporated community
- Location within the Commonwealth of Virginia Redland (the United States)
- Coordinates: 37°57′15″N 78°31′46″W
- Country: United States
- State: Virginia
- County: Albemarle
- Time zone: UTC−5 (Eastern (EST))
  - Summer (DST): UTC−4 (EDT)
- GNIS feature ID: 1675117

Redland is an unincorporated community in Albemarle County, Virginia, United States.
