= Porters, Virginia =

Unincorporated community in Virginia, United States

Porters
- Unincorporated community
- Location within the Commonwealth of Virginia Porters (the United States)
- Coordinates: 37°49′31″N 78°35′56″W
- Country: United States
- State: Virginia
- County: Albemarle
- Time zone: UTC−5 (Eastern (EST))
  - Summer (DST): UTC−4 (EDT)
- GNIS feature ID: 1472682

Porters is an unincorporated community in Albemarle County, Virginia, United States.
