= Stony Point, Virginia =

Unincorporated community in Virginia, United States

Stony Point
- Unincorporated community
- Location within the Commonwealth of Virginia Stony Point (the United States)
- Coordinates: 38°6′46″N 78°22′17″W
- Country: United States
- State: Virginia
- County: Albemarle
- Time zone: UTC−5 (Eastern (EST))
  - Summer (DST): UTC−4 (EDT)
- GNIS feature ID: 1496270

Stony Point is an unincorporated community in Albemarle County, Virginia, United States. The region acknowledged as Stony Point includes the historical villages of Proffit and Rosena. The physical core of Stony Point is the Stony Point Volunteer Fire Company, Stony Point Elementary School, and several dozen surrounding homes. A general store is the sole public service. The nearest population centers of any size are Barboursville and Charlottesville, the county seat.

A general store has long operated at the intersection of Stony Point Road (State Route 20) and Turkey Sag Road (Secondary Route 640), one of the two roads leading east over the Southwest Mountains from Stony Point. "Stony Point Market" is the name of the store currently located there; prior incarnations, in the latter half of the twentieth century, were "Bobby's" and "Bell's Store." The earliest known general store at that location was the one owned and operated by Colonel Nimrod Branham, a member of the House of Delegates, which opened in 1797.
