= Glendower, Virginia =

Unincorporated community in Virginia, United States

Glendower
- Unincorporated community
- Location within the Commonwealth of Virginia Glendower (the United States)
- Coordinates: 37°50′15″N 78°32′37″W
- Country: United States
- State: Virginia
- County: Albemarle
- Time zone: UTC−5 (Eastern (EST))
  - Summer (DST): UTC−4 (EDT)
- GNIS feature ID: 1494226

Glendower is an unincorporated community in Albemarle County, Virginia, United States.

Pine Knot was listed on the National Register of Historic Places in 1989.
