= Freetown, Virginia =

Unincorporated community in Virginia, United States

Freetown
- Unincorporated community
- Location within the Commonwealth of Virginia Freetown (the United States)
- Coordinates: 38°02′54″N 78°42′44″W
- Country: United States
- State: Virginia
- County: Albemarle
- Time zone: UTC−5 (Eastern (EST))
  - Summer (DST): UTC−4 (EDT)
- GNIS feature ID: 1675258

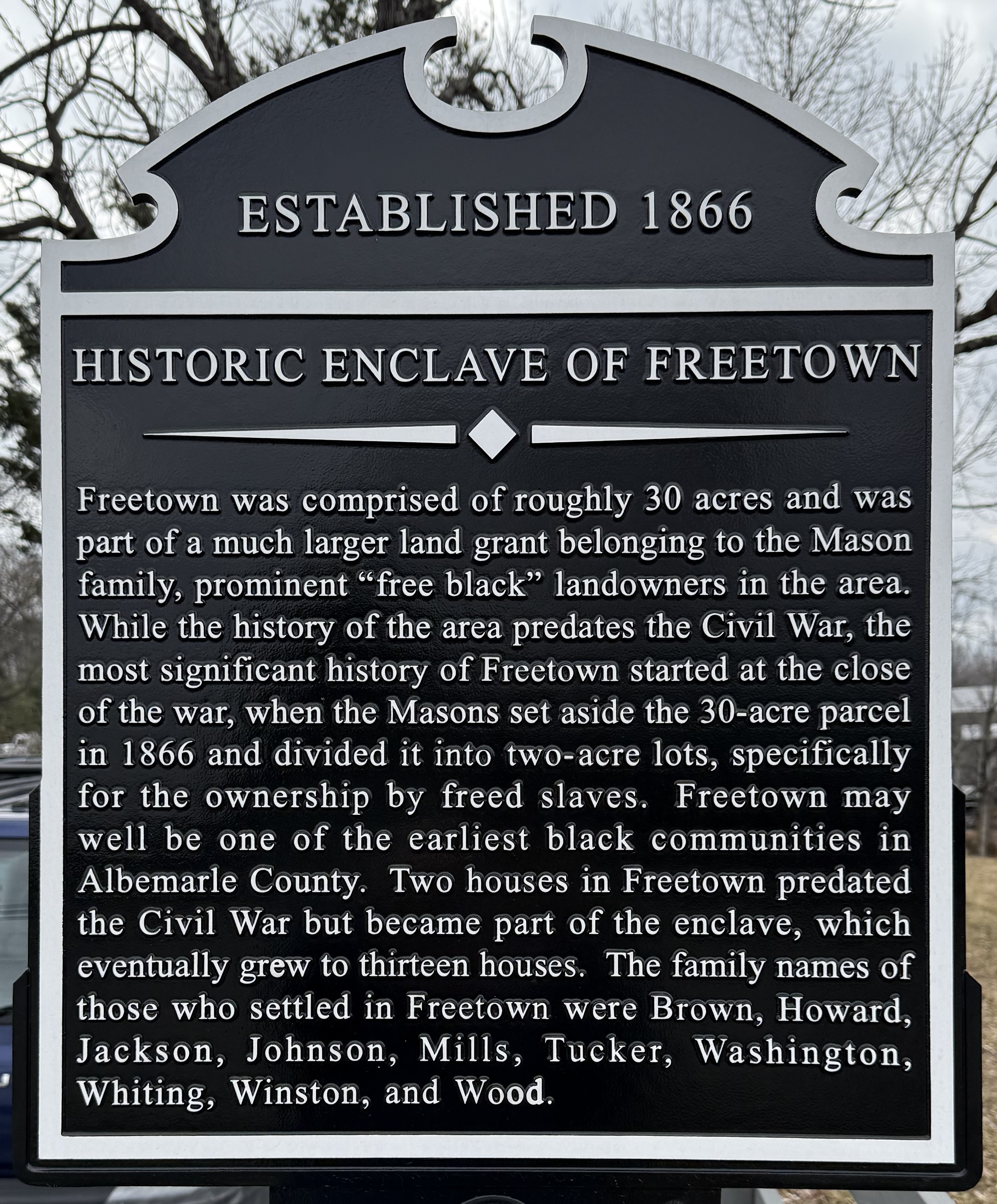
Historical Marker. Freetown, Albemarle Co, VA

Freetown is an unincorporated community in Albemarle County, Virginia, United States. The community got its name because freed slaves settled there. Freetown was established by former slaves who bought the land from Berrell Mason in two-acre lots.
