= Bentivar, Virginia =

Unincorporated community in Virginia, United States

Bentivar
- Unincorporated community
- Location within the state of Virginia Bentivar (the United States)
- Coordinates: 38°06′00″N 78°25′34″W
- Country: United States
- State: Virginia
- County: Albemarle
- Time zone: UTC−5 (Eastern (EST))
  - Summer (DST): UTC−4 (EDT)
- ZIP codes: 22911
- GNIS feature ID: 1675189

Bentivar is an unincorporated community in Albemarle County, Virginia, United States.

This neighborhood sits on land once owned by the Carr family back in the late 1790s. The oldest estate dates back to approximately 1830, with some of the most recent homes constructed in the 2000s.
