= Boonesville, Virginia =

Unincorporated community in Virginia, United States

Boonesville
- Unincorporated community
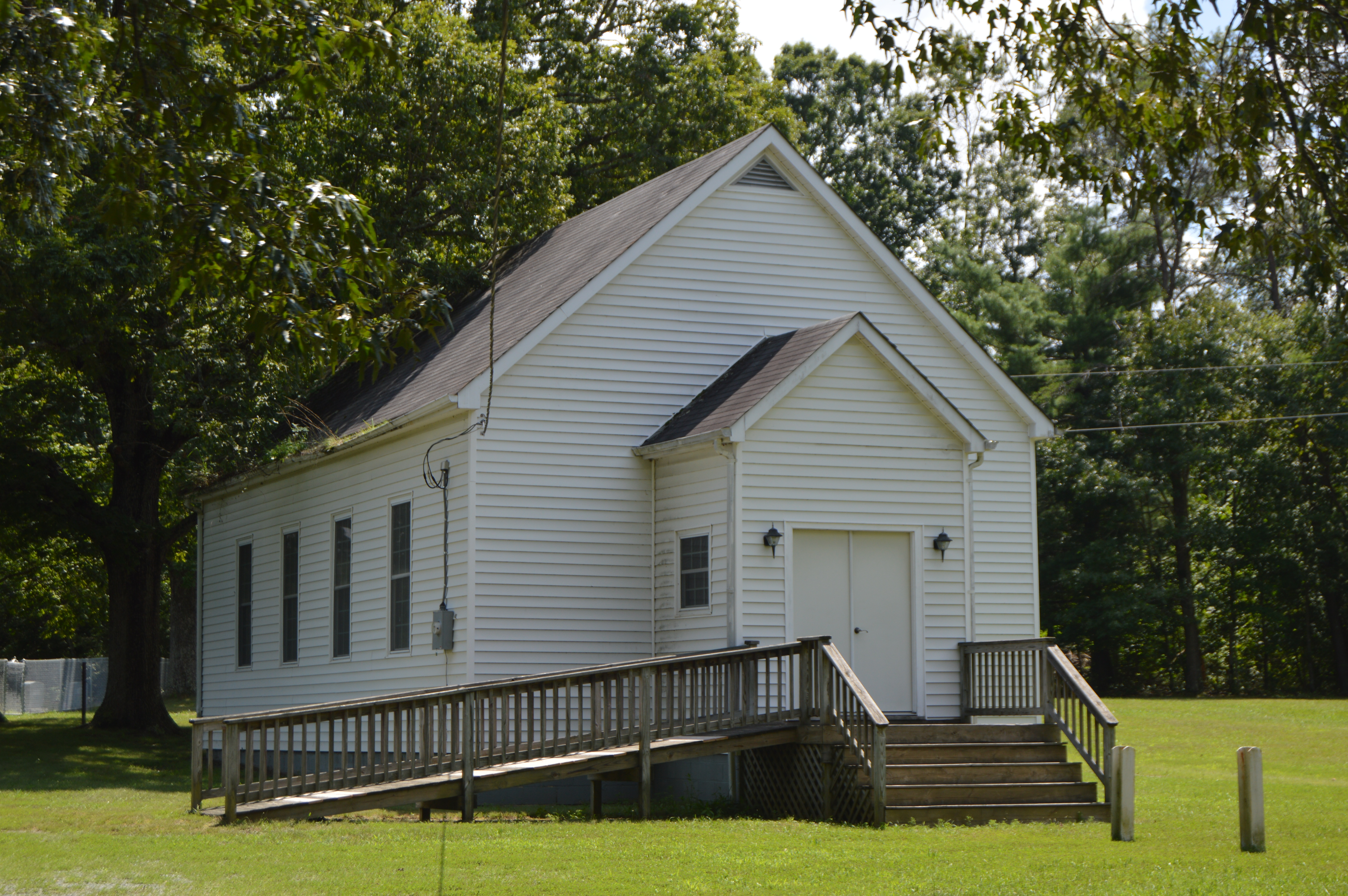
- Gentry United Methodist Church

- Location within the state of Virginia Boonesville (the United States)
- Coordinates: 38°14′10″N 78°35′52″W
- Country: United States
- State: Virginia
- County: Albemarle
- Time zone: UTC−5 (Eastern (EST))
  - Summer (DST): UTC−4 (EDT)
- GNIS feature ID: 1477129

Boonesville is an unincorporated community in Albemarle County, Virginia, United States.
