= Evelyn Magruder DeJarnette =

American author (1842–1902)

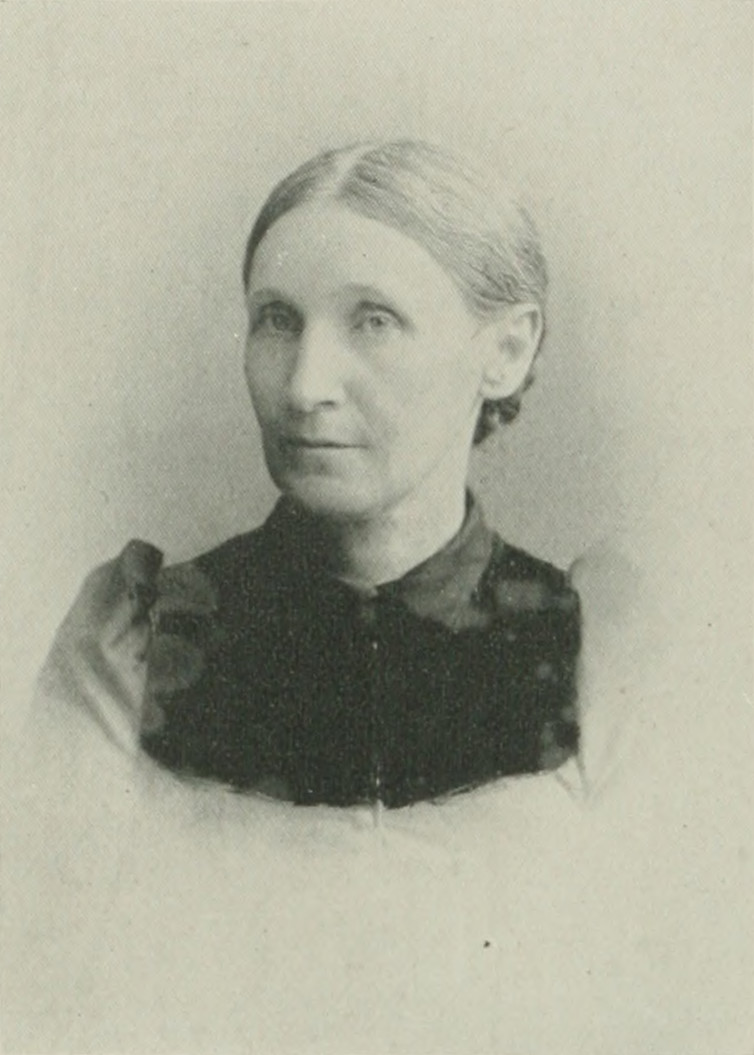
- Photo in A Woman of the Century
- Born: Evelyn May Magruder; March 4, 1842; Glenmore, Albemarle County, Virginia, U.S.
- Died: July 3, 1902 (aged 60) "Pine Forest", Spotsylvania County, Virginia, U.S.
- Resting place: "Pine Forest" private cemetery
- Occupation: author
- Spouse: Elliott Hawes DeJarnette (m. 1864)
- Writing career
- Language: English

Evelyn Magruder DeJarnette (née, Magruder; March 4, 1842 – July 3, 1902) was an American Southern author from Virginia, who wrote stories in African American dialect. The daughter of a prominent Virginia lawyer, she began her literary career in 1870 with prose and poetry contributions to a variety of well-known magazines, including The Century Magazine and the Atlantic Monthly. Her published works include "Old Vote for Young Master" and "Out on A' Scurgeon."

== Early life and education ==
Evelyn May Magruder was born in Glenmore, Albemarle County, Virginia, on March 4, 1842. She was the third child of Benjamin Henry and Maria Minon Magruder. Her father was a prominent Virginia lawyer and legislator, and in 1864, was elected to the Congress of the Confederate States. Her mother's family was from Piedmont Virginia.

During her childhood, she reportedly taught classes to the enslaved children on her family's plantation.

Magruder attended boarding school for several terms. During her father's connection with the General Assembly, she was a frequent visitor to Richmond, Virginia, where she took part in social gatherings.

== Career ==
In 1870, that she began her literary career in prose and poetry. Frank Leslie's Magazine, The Century Magazine, the Atlantic Monthly, The Youth's Companion, and various newspapers accepted her contributions. Among her publications are "Old Vote for Young Master" and "Out on A' Scurgeon."

== Personal life ==
In 1864, she married Elliott Hawes DeJarnette. He had been farmer, and a slave owner, who left his studies at the University of Virginia to volunteer early in the Civil war, becoming a captain, and serving with distinction in the Confederate army. At Antietam, he was severely wounded. After marriage, they moved into his family home, "Pine Forest," in Spotsylvania County, Virginia. The DeJarnettes had eight children.

Evelyn Magruder DeJarnette died at "Pine Forest" in Spotsylvania County, Virginia, on July 3, 1902, and is buried in its private cemetery.
