= Commonwealth, Virginia =

Unincorporated community in Virginia, United States

Commonwealth
- Unincorporated community former census designated place
- Location within the state of Virginia Commonwealth (the United States)
- Coordinates: 38°04′29″N 78°29′14″W
- Country: United States
- State: Virginia
- County: Albemarle
- Time zone: UTC−5 (Eastern (EST))
  - Summer (DST): UTC−4 (EDT)
- GNIS feature ID: 1867587

Commonwealth is an unincorporated community in Albemarle County, Virginia, United States. It is a suburb north of Charlottesville.

It was listed as a census designated place by the United States Census Bureau until it was deleted prior to the 2000 United States Census.

Historical population
Census	Pop.	Note	%±
1980	3,505		—
1990	5,538		58.0%
U.S. Decennial Census; 1990 2000 2010 2020
