= Woodridge, Virginia =

Unincorporated community in Virginia, United States

Woodridge
- Unincorporated community
- Location within the Commonwealth of Virginia Woodridge (the United States)
- Coordinates: 37°53′50″N 78°26′10″W
- Country: United States
- State: Virginia
- County: Albemarle
- Time zone: UTC−5 (Eastern (EST))
  - Summer (DST): UTC−4 (EDT)
- GNIS feature ID: 1500350

Woodridge is an unincorporated community in Albemarle County, Virginia, United States.
