= Farmington, Virginia =

Unincorporated community in Virginia, United States

Farmington
- Unincorporated community
- Location within the state of Virginia Farmington (the United States)
- Coordinates: 38°3′4″N 78°32′39″W
- Country: United States
- State: Virginia
- County: Albemarle
- Time zone: UTC−5 (Eastern (EST))
  - Summer (DST): UTC−4 (EDT)
- GNIS feature ID: 1492932

Farmington is an unincorporated community in Albemarle County, Virginia, United States. Its elevation is 600 feet (183 m).
