= Hydraulic, Virginia =

Unincorporated community in Virginia, United States

Hydraulic
- Unincorporated community
- Location within the Commonwealth of Virginia Hydraulic (the United States)
- Coordinates: 38°05′40″N 78°29′09″W
- Country: United States
- State: Virginia
- County: Albemarle
- Time zone: UTC−5 (Eastern (EST))
  - Summer (DST): UTC−4 (EDT)
- GNIS feature ID: 1493120

Hydraulic is an unincorporated community in Albemarle County, Virginia, United States.
