= Barterbrook, Virginia =

Unincorporated community in Virginia, United States

Barterbrook
- Unincorporated community
- Location within the state of Virginia Barterbrook (the United States)
- Coordinates: 38°3′57″N 78°29′54″W
- Country: United States
- State: Virginia
- County: Albemarle
- Elevation: 525 ft (160 m)
- Time zone: UTC−5 (Eastern (EST))
  - Summer (DST): UTC−4 (EDT)
- GNIS feature ID: 1675181

Barterbrook is an unincorporated community in Albemarle County, Virginia, United States.
