= Wilhait, Virginia =

Unincorporated community in Virginia, United States

Wilhait
- Unincorporated community
- Location within the Commonwealth of Virginia Wilhait (the United States)
- Coordinates: 38°13′20″N 78°31′29″W
- Country: United States
- State: Virginia
- County: Albemarle
- Time zone: UTC−5 (Eastern (EST))
  - Summer (DST): UTC−4 (EDT)
- GNIS feature ID: 1675164

Wilhait is an unincorporated community in Albemarle County, Virginia, United States. There was a post village in Albemarle County named Wilhoit in existence as of 1904.

== Sources ==
- Gannett, Henry (1904). The Gazetteer of Virginia. United States Government Printing Office.
