= Midway, Albemarle County, Virginia =

Unincorporated community in Virginia, United States

Midway
- Unincorporated community
- Location within the Commonwealth of Virginia Midway (the United States)
- Coordinates: 38°01′39″N 78°42′23″W
- Country: United States
- State: Virginia
- County: Albemarle
- Time zone: UTC−5 (Eastern (EST))
  - Summer (DST): UTC−4 (EDT)

Midway is an unincorporated community in Albemarle County, Virginia, United States. It lies at an elevation of 705 feet (215 m).
