= Midway Island, Virginia =

Midway Island
- Unincorporated community
- Location within the state of Virginia Midway Island (Virginia) Midway Island (the United States)
- Coordinates: 38°30′01″N 77°22′16″W
- Country: United States
- State: Virginia
- County: Stafford
- Elevation: 164 ft (50 m)
- Time zone: UTC−5 (Eastern (EST))
  - Summer (DST): UTC−4 (EDT)
- GNIS feature ID: 1499742

Midway Island is an unincorporated community in Stafford County, Virginia, United States. It lies at an elevation of 164 feet (50 m).

Midway Island was the name of a subdivision consisting of off-base housing for Marines stationed at nearby Quantico. It was torn down and is now the site of the Naval Research Laboratory's Midway Research Center.
