= Midway, Charlottesville =

Unincorporated community in Virginia, United States

Midway
- Unincorporated community
- Location within the Commonwealth of Virginia Midway (the United States)
- Coordinates: 38°06′31″N 78°35′55″W
- Country: United States
- State: Virginia
- County: Albemarle
- Time zone: UTC−5 (Eastern (EST))
  - Summer (DST): UTC−4 (EDT)

Midway is an unincorporated community in Albemarle County, Virginia, United States, near Charlottesville. It lies at an elevation of 630 feet (192 m).
