= North Garden, Virginia =

Unincorporated community in Virginia, United States

- Census-designated place
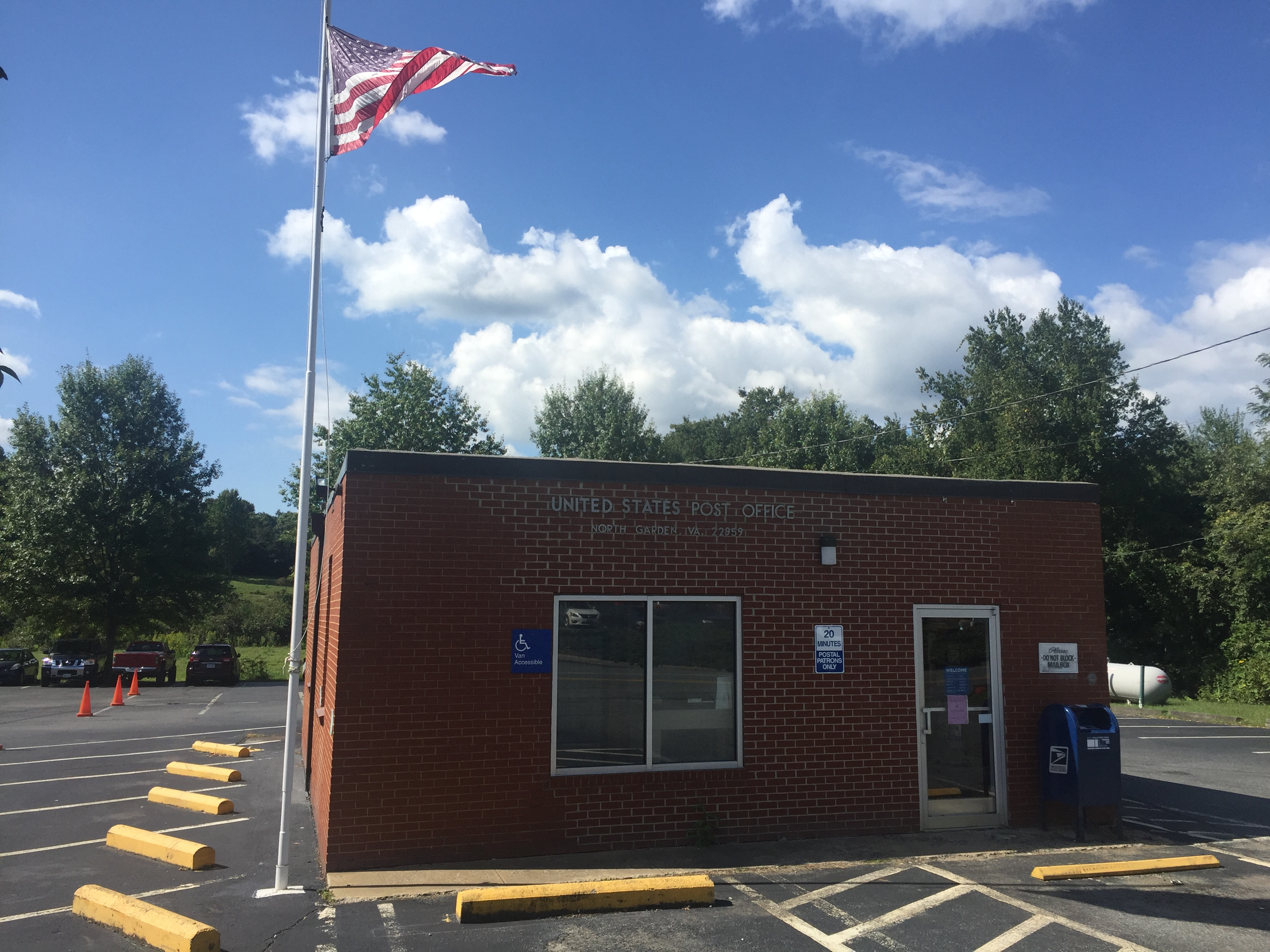
- North Garden Post Office

- Location of the North Garden CDP within the Albemarle county

- Location within Virginia Location within the United States
- Coordinates: 37°57′40.47″N 78°38′0.25″W
- Country: United States
- State: Virginia
- County: Albemarle

Area
  - Total: 2.84 sq mi (7.35 km^{2})
  - Land: 2.83 sq mi (7.33 km^{2})
  - Water: 0.0077 sq mi (0.02 km^{2})
- Elevation: 604 ft (184 m)

Population (2020)
  - Total: 461
- Time zone: UTC-5 (Eastern (EST))
  - Summer (DST): UTC-4 (EDT)
- ZIP code: 22959
- Area code: 434
- FIPS code: 51-57368
- GNIS feature ID: 2807399

North Garden is a census-designated place in Albemarle County, Virginia, United States. The population as of the 2020 United States census was 461.

== Geography ==
North Garden is 10.5 miles (16.9 km) southwest of Charlottesville. North Garden has a post office with ZIP code 22959.

Cocke's Mill House and Mill Site was added to the National Register of Historic Places in 1990.

== Demographics ==
North Garden first appeared as a census designated place in the 2020 U.S. census.
