= Ehart, Virginia =

Unincorporated community in Virginia, United States

Ehart
- Unincorporated community
- Location within the Commonwealth of Virginia Ehart (the United States)
- Coordinates: 38°10′38″N 78°29′57″W
- Country: United States
- State: Virginia
- County: Albemarle
- Time zone: UTC−5 (Eastern (EST))
  - Summer (DST): UTC−4 (EDT)
- GNIS feature ID: 1675245

Ehart is an unincorporated community in Albemarle County, Virginia, United States.
