= Allenslevel, Virginia =

Unincorporated community in Virginia, United States

Coordinates: 37°33′43″N 78°29′22″W

Allenslevel is an unincorporated community in Buckingham County, in the U.S. state of Virginia.
