= Midway Heights, Virginia =

Unincorporated community in Virginia, United States

Midway Heights
- Unincorporated community
- Location within the Commonwealth of Virginia Midway Heights (the United States)
- Coordinates: 37°10′20″N 80°25′06″W
- Country: United States
- State: Virginia
- County: Montgomery
- Time zone: UTC−5 (Eastern (EST))
  - Summer (DST): UTC−4 (EDT)

Midway Heights is an unincorporated community in Montgomery County, Virginia, United States. It lies at an elevation of 2080 feet (634 m).
