= Midway, Giles County, Virginia =

Unincorporated community in Virginia, United States

Coordinates: 37°23′29″N 80°48′29″W

Midway is an unincorporated community in Giles County, Virginia, United States. It lies at an elevation of 1,719 feet (524 m).
