= Midway, Washington County, Virginia =

Unincorporated community in Virginia, US

Coordinates: 36°47′10″N 81°52′34″W

Midway is an unincorporated community in Washington County, Virginia, United States. It lies at an elevation of 2034 feet (620 m).
