= Key West, Virginia =

Unincorporated community in Virginia, United States

Key West
- Subdivision
- Location within the Commonwealth of Virginia Key West (the United States)
- Coordinates: 38°03′26″N 78°26′27″W
- Country: United States
- State: Virginia
- County: Albemarle
- Time zone: UTC−5 (Eastern (EST))
  - Summer (DST): UTC−4 (EDT)
- GNIS feature ID: 1493164

Key West is both a subdivision in Albemarle County, Virginia, United States and a historic home that formerly served as a place name for the community. The Key West estate was owned by the Minors, a prominent and wealthy family, before much of the land was sold off to become the Key West subdivision. The house still stands.

The Key West subdivision is located one mile (1.6 km) north of Charlottesville on VA

Route 20. The land is the west side of the property granted to Martin Key in 1731 by George II.
