= Alberene, Virginia =

Unincorporated community in Virginia, United States

Alberene
- Unincorporated community
- Location within the state of Virginia Alberene (the United States)
- Coordinates: 37°53′12″N 78°36′59″W
- Country: United States
- State: Virginia
- County: Albemarle
- Elevation: 522 ft (159 m)
- Time zone: UTC−5 (Eastern (EST))
  - Summer (DST): UTC−4 (EDT)
- GNIS feature ID: 1492453

Alberene is an unincorporated community in Albemarle County, Virginia, United States. It is noted for its soapstone.
