= Rose Hill, Albemarle County, Virginia =

Unincorporated community in Virginia, United States

Rose Hill
- Unincorporated community
- Location within the Commonwealth of Virginia Rose Hill (the United States)
- Coordinates: 37°59′33″N 78°25′07″W
- Country: United States
- State: Virginia
- County: Albemarle
- Time zone: UTC−5 (Eastern (EST))
  - Summer (DST): UTC−4 (EDT)
- GNIS feature ID: 1675120

Rose Hill is an unincorporated community in Albemarle County, Virginia, United States.
