= Pine Knot (cabin) =

Historic house in Virginia, United States

- U.S. National Register of Historic Places
- Virginia Landmarks Register
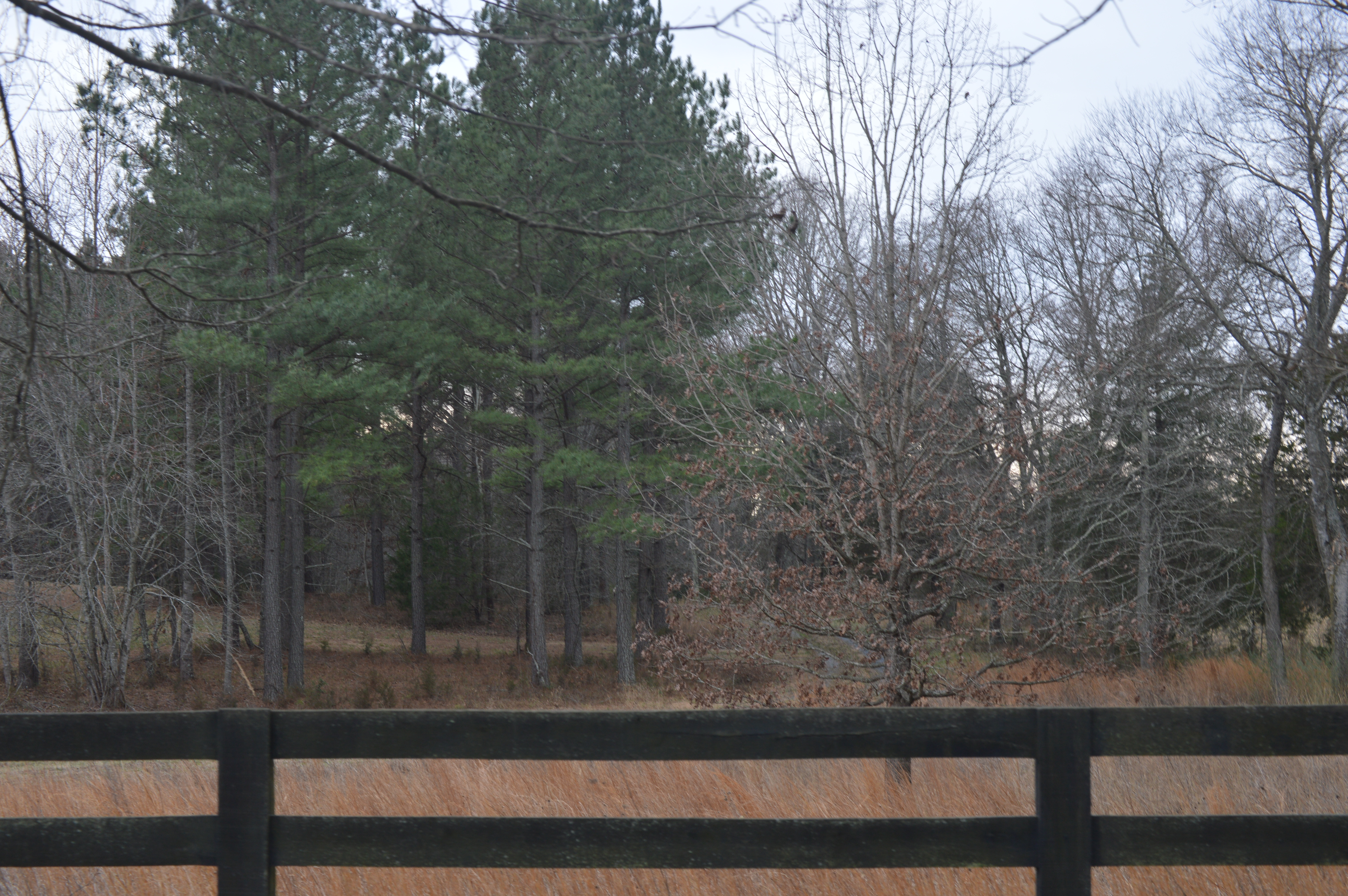
- Fenceline at the edge of the property

- Location within Virginia Location within the United States
- Location: VA 712, Glendower, near Charlottesville, Virginia
- Coordinates: 37°51′0″N 78°31′25″W
- Area: 90 acres (36 ha)
- Built: 1905
- NRHP reference No.: 88003211
- VLR No.: 002-0617

Significant dates
- Added to NRHP: February 1, 1989
- Designated VLR: April 19, 1988

Pine Knot is a historic cabin located 14 miles (23 km) south of Charlottesville, Virginia in Albemarle County, Virginia. The cabin was owned and occupied by the 26th president of the United States, Theodore Roosevelt and his wife Edith Kermit Roosevelt, and used by Roosevelt and the first lady while he was president, although no official business took place there. In 1905, Edith Roosevelt spent $280 to purchase the fifteen-acre property with its rustic worker's cabin, and she bought an additional seventy-five acres in 1911. The cabin is owned by the Edith and Theodore Roosevelt Pine Knot Foundation and is open for visits by appointment.

== Background ==
The idea of purchasing the cabin was to be an escape for both the First Lady and the President. President Roosevelt was known throughout his presidency to travel frequently, many times to experience the natural wonders of certain areas such as in the states of Oklahoma and Colorado. While traveling, Edith Roosevelt decided to purchase the property after visiting family friends Joe and Will Wilmer on May 6, 1905. Realizing her husband's love for the surrounding countryside, she decided to purchase the cabin to help her and her husband "rest and repair" from the strain of political life in Washington D.C. The cabin was surrounded by the wilderness, which appealed to her. A description characterized it thus: "tucked away among red and white oak, red cedars, dogwoods, red maples and black cherry trees, was a rustic worker's cabin".

The cabin was built in 1905, and is a simple two-story, single-pile frame dwelling. It features a deep, full two-story front porch which extends across the front of the facade. It has an unfinished interior and is without modern conveniences of any kind.

It was listed on the National Register of Historic Places in 1989.

== See also ==
- List of residences of presidents of the United States
- Presidential memorials in the United States
