= Glenmore, Albemarle County, Virginia =

Unincorporated community in Virginia, United States

Glenmore
- Unincorporated community
- Location within the Commonwealth of Virginia Glenmore (the United States)
- Coordinates: 37°40′17.5″N 78°35′24″W
- Country: United States
- State: Virginia
- County: Albemarle
- Time zone: UTC−5 (Eastern (EST))
  - Summer (DST): UTC−4 (EDT)
- ZIP codes: 22947
- GNIS feature ID: 1675265

Glenmore is a suburban development and country club in Albemarle County, Virginia, United States, just east of Charlottesville. It has a golf course, equestrian complex, swimming pool, tennis courts, and a clubhouse. The price of homes range from $500,000 to $2.5 million. The entire development is 1,300 acres (5.3 km^{2}) in size, broken up into 824 homesites, with 500 acres (2.0 km^{2}) maintained as common land.

== Notable people ==
- Evelyn Magruder DeJarnette (1842–1914), author
