= Eastham, Virginia =

Unincorporated community in Virginia, United States

Eastham
- Unincorporated community
- Location within the Commonwealth of Virginia Eastham (the United States)
- Coordinates: 38°04′18″N 78°24′42″W
- Country: United States
- State: Virginia
- County: Albemarle
- Time zone: UTC−5 (Eastern (EST))
  - Summer (DST): UTC−4 (EDT)
- GNIS feature ID: 1492895

Eastham is an unincorporated community in Albemarle County, Virginia, United States.
