= Overton, Virginia =

Unincorporated community in Virginia, United States

Overton
- Unincorporated community
- Location within the Commonwealth of Virginia Overton (the United States)
- Coordinates: 37°57′26″N 78°28′4″W
- Country: United States
- State: Virginia
- County: Albemarle
- Elevation: 505 ft (154 m)
- Time zone: UTC−5 (Eastern (EST))
  - Summer (DST): UTC−4 (EDT)
- GNIS feature ID: 1477599

Overton is an unincorporated community in Albemarle County, Virginia, United States. Its elevation is 505 feet (154 m).
