= Midway, Halifax County, Virginia =

Unincorporated community in Virginia, United States

Coordinates: 36°47′54″N 78°46′42″W

Midway is an unincorporated community in Halifax County, Virginia, United States, near Scottsburg. It lies at an elevation of 430 feet (131 m).
