= Pantops, Virginia =

Pantops
- CDP
- Location of the Pantops CDP within the Albemarle county

- Location within the Commonwealth of Virginia
- Coordinates: 38°1′51″N 78°26′41″W
- Country: United States
- State: Virginia
- County: Albemarle

Population (2020)
  - Total: 4,682
- Time zone: UTC−5 (Eastern (EST))
  - Summer (DST): UTC−4 (EDT)
- ZIP codes: 22911
- FIPS code: 51-60500
- GNIS feature ID: 2584899

Pantops is a census-designated place in Albemarle County, Virginia, United States.

As of the 2020 census, Pantops had a population of 4,682.

== Geography ==
It is a suburban area located just across the Rivanna River east of Charlottesville, and includes Pantops Mountain.

== Demographics ==
Historical population
Census	Pop.	Note	%±
2010	3,027		—
2020	4,682		54.7%
U.S. Decennial Census; 2010 2020

=== 2020 census ===
As of the 2020 census, Pantops had a population of 4,682. The median age was 42.2 years. 17.6% of residents were under the age of 18 and 29.4% of residents were 65 years of age or older. For every 100 females there were 76.3 males, and for every 100 females age 18 and over there were 71.7 males age 18 and over.

100.0% of residents lived in urban areas, while 0.0% lived in rural areas.

There were 2,327 households in Pantops, of which 21.2% had children under the age of 18 living in them. Of all households, 38.1% were married-couple households, 16.0% were households with a male householder and no spouse or partner present, and 40.4% were households with a female householder and no spouse or partner present. About 44.3% of all households were made up of individuals and 24.2% had someone living alone who was 65 years of age or older.

There were 2,494 housing units, of which 6.7% were vacant. The homeowner vacancy rate was 3.4% and the rental vacancy rate was 4.9%.

Racial composition as of the 2020 census
Race	Number	Percent
White	3,408	72.8%
Black or African American	493	10.5%
American Indian and Alaska Native	5	0.1%
Asian	325	6.9%
Native Hawaiian and Other Pacific Islander	6	0.1%
Some other race	120	2.6%
Two or more races	325	6.9%
Hispanic or Latino (of any race)	296	6.3%

=== 2010 census ===
Pantops was first listed as a census designated place in the 2010 U.S. census.

As of the 2010 census, the population was 3,027.
