= Albemarle County, Virginia =

County in Virginia, United States

- County
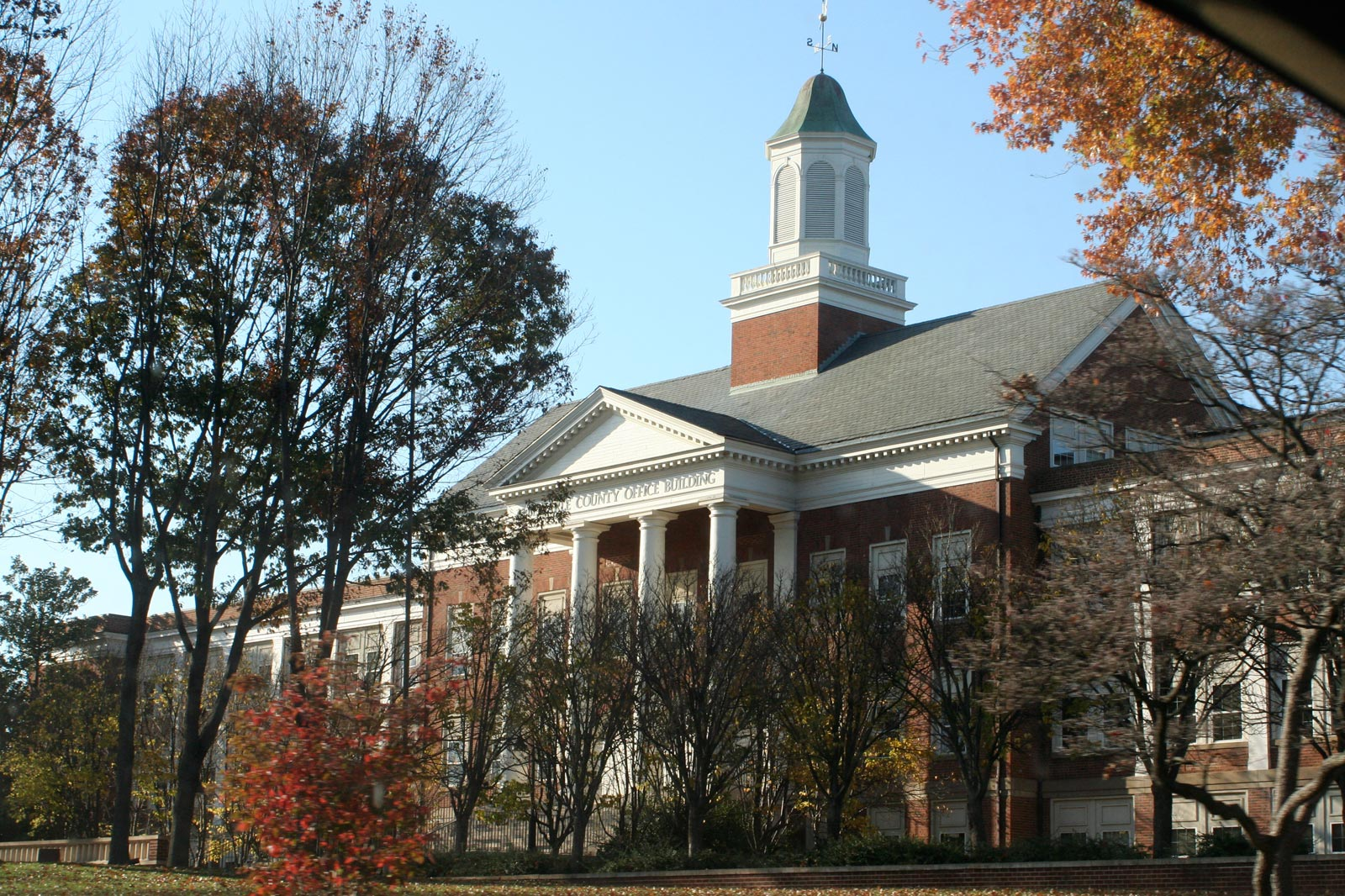
- The Albemarle County Office Building

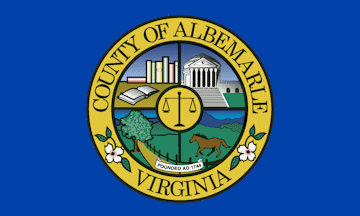
- Flag Seal

- Location within the U.S. state of Virginia
- Coordinates: 38°02′N 78°34′W
- Country: United States
- State: Virginia
- Founded: 1744
- Named for: Willem Anne van Keppel, 2nd Earl of Albemarle
- Seat: Charlottesville (independent city)^{1}
- Largest town: Scottsville

Area
  - Total: 726 sq mi (1,880 km^{2})
  - Land: 721 sq mi (1,870 km^{2})
  - Water: 5 sq mi (13 km^{2}) 0.7%

Population (2020)
  - Total: 112,395
  - Estimate (2025): 118,356 ▲
  - Density: 155/sq mi (60/km^{2})
- Time zone: UTC−5 (Eastern)
  - Summer (DST): UTC−4 (EDT)
- Congressional districts: 5th, 7th
- Website: www.albemarle.org

Albemarle County is located in the Piedmont region of the Commonwealth of Virginia in the United States. Its county seat is Charlottesville, which is an independent city entirely surrounded by the county. Albemarle County is part of the Charlottesville Metropolitan Statistical Area. As of the 2020 census, the population was 112,395.

Albemarle County was created in 1744 from the western portion of Goochland County, though portions of Albemarle were later carved out to create other counties. Albemarle County was named in honor of Willem Anne van Keppel, 2nd Earl of Albemarle. Its most famous inhabitant was Thomas Jefferson, who built his estate home, Monticello, in the county.

== History ==
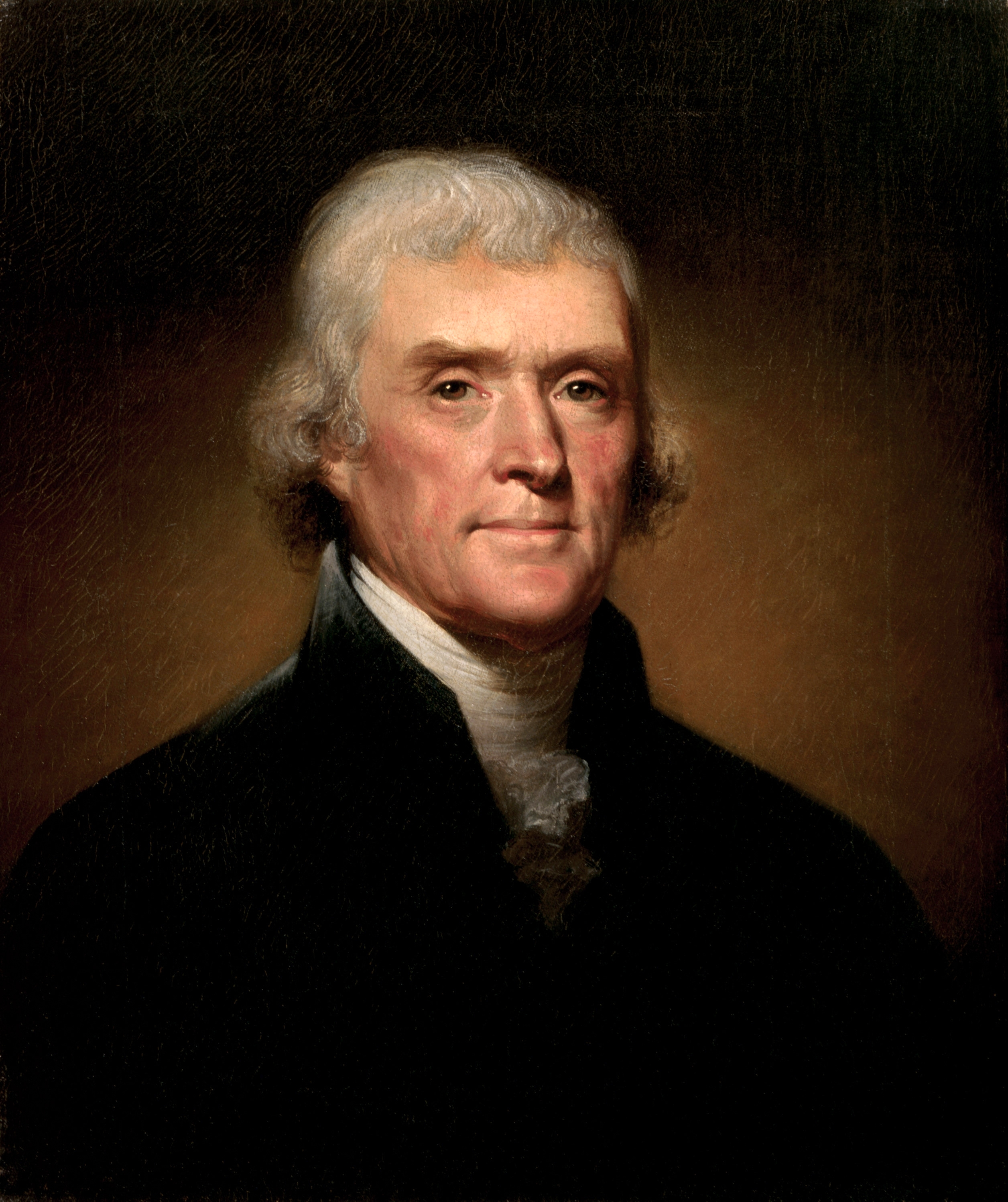
Thomas Jefferson lived most of his life in Albemarle County

At the time of European encounter, the inhabitants of the area that became Albemarle County were a Siouan-speaking tribe called the Saponi. In 1744, the Virginia General Assembly created Albemarle County from the western portion of Goochland County. The county was named in honor of Willem Anne van Keppel, 2nd Earl of Albemarle and titular Governor of Virginia at the time. The large county was partitioned in 1761, forming Buckingham and Amherst counties, at which time the county seat was moved from the formerly central Scottsville to a piece of newly central land, christened Charlottesville. In 1777, Albemarle County was divided and Fluvanna County established, finalizing the boundaries of modern Albemarle County.

Albemarle County is well known for its association with President and Founding Father Thomas Jefferson, who was born in the county at Shadwell, though it was then part of Goochland County. However, his home of Monticello is located in the county. When the American Revolutionary War started in 1775, Jefferson was made colonel of the Albemarle Militia.

During the Civil War, the Battle of Rio Hill was a skirmish in which Union cavalry raided a Confederate camp in Albemarle County, Virginia.

Until the Civil War, the majority of Albemarle County's population consisted of enslaved African Americans.

== Geography ==
According to the U.S. Census Bureau, the county has a total area of 726 square miles (1,880 km^{2}), of which 721 square miles (1,870 km^{2}) is land and 5 square miles (13 km^{2}) (0.7%) is water.

=== Waterways ===
The Rivanna River's south fork forms in Albemarle County and was historically important for transportation. The south fork flows in-between Darden Towe Park and Pen Park. Boat ramp access is available at Darden Towe Park. The James River acts as a natural border between Albemarle and Buckingham Counties.

=== Major highways ===
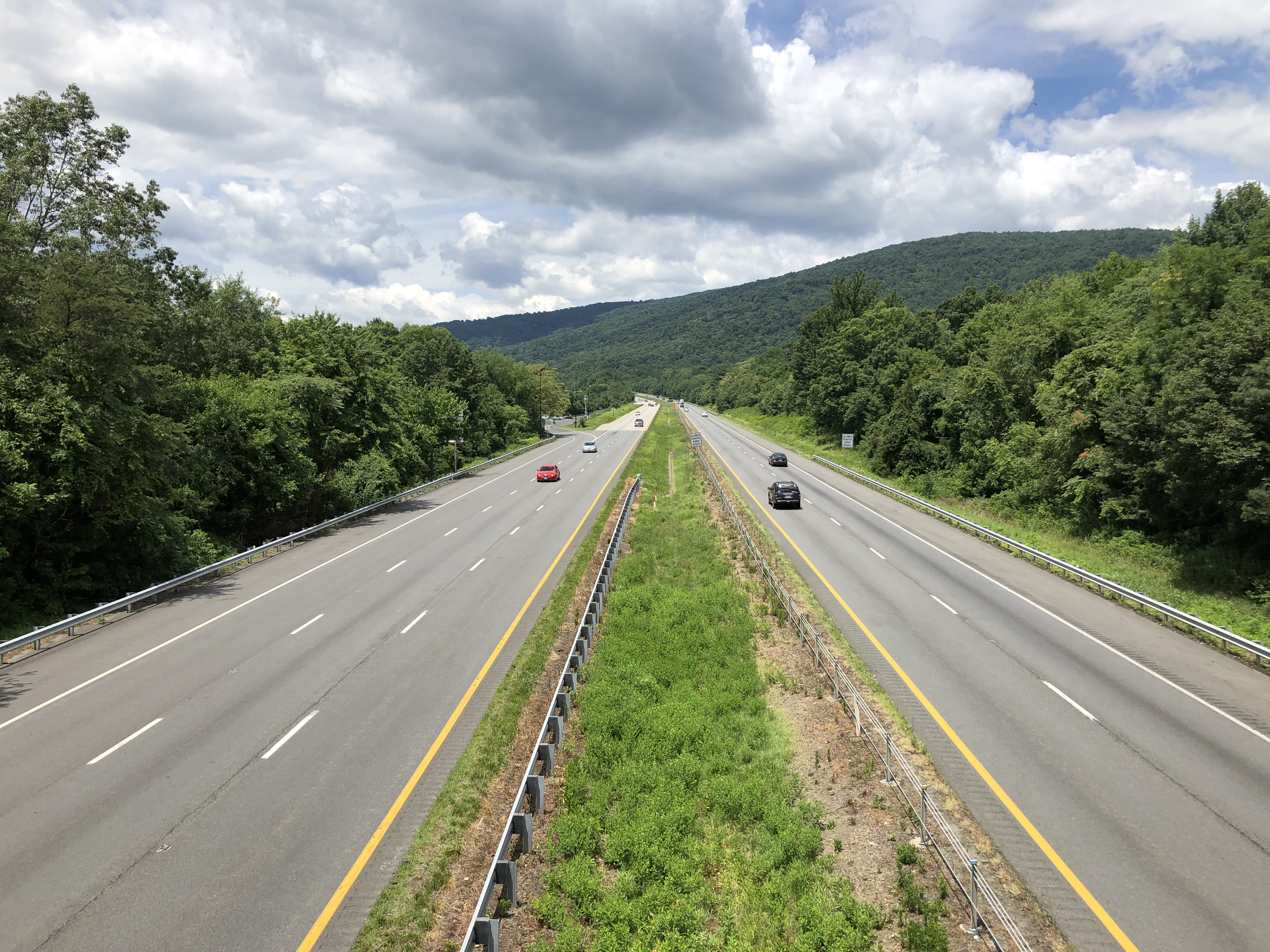
I-64 in Albemarle County

- I-64
- US 29
- US 250
- SR 6
- SR 20
- SR 22
- SR 53
- SR 240

=== Protected areas ===
Albemarle's western border with Augusta and Rockingham Counties is located within the Shenandoah National Park.

=== Adjacent counties ===
Albemarle County borders eight other counties, more than any other county in Virginia.

- Charlottesville (surrounded by Albemarle County)
- Greene County (north)
- Orange County (northeast)
- Louisa County (east)
- Fluvanna County (southeast)
- Buckingham County (south)
- Nelson County (southwest)
- Augusta County (west)
- Rockingham County (northwest)

=== Parks and recreation ===
- Beaver Creek Lake
- Biscuit Run Park
- Brook Hill Park
- Chris Greene Lake Park
- Darden Towe Park
- Charlotte Humphris Park
- Beaver Creek Park
- Dorrier Park
- Charlotte Y. Humphris Park
- Ivy Creek Natural Area
- Mint Springs Valley Park
- Patricia Ann Byrom Forest Preserve Park
- Preddy Creek Park
- Simpson Park
- Totier Creek Park
- Walnut Creek Park
- Western Park

== Demographics ==
Historical population
Census	Pop.	Note	%±
1790	12,585		—
1800	16,439		30.6%
1810	18,268		11.1%
1820	19,750		8.1%
1830	22,618		14.5%
1840	22,294		−1.4%
1850	25,800		15.7%
1860	26,625		3.2%
1870	27,544		3.5%
1880	32,618		18.4%
1890	32,379		−0.7%
1900	28,473		−12.1%
1910	29,871		4.9%
1920	26,005		−12.9%
1930	26,981		3.8%
1940	24,652		−8.6%
1950	26,662		8.2%
1960	30,969		16.2%
1970	37,780		22.0%
1980	55,783		47.7%
1990	68,040		22.0%
2000	79,236		16.5%
2010	98,970		24.9%
2020	112,395		13.6%
2025 (est.)	118,356	▲	5.3%
U.S. Decennial Census; 1790–1960 1900–1990; 1990–2000 2010 2020

=== Racial and ethnic composition ===
Albemarle County, Virginia – Racial and ethnic composition Note: the US Census treats Hispanic/Latino as an ethnic category. This table excludes Latinos from the racial categories and assigns them to a separate category. Hispanics/Latinos may be of any race.
Race / Ethnicity (NH = Non-Hispanic)	Pop 1980	Pop 1990	Pop 2000	Pop 2010	Pop 2020	% 1980	% 1990	% 2000	% 2010	% 2020
White alone (NH)	48,582	58,700	66,218	77,130	80,335	87.09%	86.27%	83.57%	77.93%	71.48%
Black or African American alone (NH)	6,145	6,799	7,586	9,487	9,793	11.02%	9.99%	9.57%	9.59%	8.71%
Native American or Alaska Native alone (NH)	41	72	113	150	96	0.07%	0.11%	0.14%	0.15%	0.09%
Asian alone (NH)	504	1,623	2,267	4,597	8,186	0.90%	2.39%	2.86%	4.64%	7.28%
Native Hawaiian or Pacific Islander alone (NH)	x	x	6	42	44	x	x	0.01%	0.04%	0.04%
Other race alone (NH)	92	60	137	173	604	0.16%	0.09%	0.17%	0.17%	0.54%
Mixed race or Multiracial (NH)	x	x	880	1,974	4,884	x	x	1.11%	1.99%	4.35%
Hispanic or Latino (any race)	419	786	2,029	5,417	8,453	0.75%	1.16%	2.56%	5.47%	7.52%
Total	55,783	68,040	79,236	98,970	112,395	100.00%	100.00%	100.00%	100.00%	100.00%

=== 2020 census ===
As of the 2020 census, the county had a population of 112,395. The median age was 38.8 years. 20.3% of residents were under the age of 18 and 19.4% of residents were 65 years of age or older. For every 100 females there were 91.3 males, and for every 100 females age 18 and over there were 88.1 males age 18 and over.

The racial makeup of the county was 72.8% White, 8.9% Black or African American, 0.3% American Indian and Alaska Native, 7.3% Asian, 0.0% Native Hawaiian and Pacific Islander, 3.6% from some other race, and 7.0% from two or more races. Hispanic or Latino residents of any race comprised 7.5% of the population.

59.6% of residents lived in urban areas, while 40.4% lived in rural areas.

There were 43,468 households in the county, of which 28.2% had children under the age of 18 living with them and 28.1% had a female householder with no spouse or partner present. About 28.5% of all households were made up of individuals and 12.3% had someone living alone who was 65 years of age or older.

There were 47,291 housing units, of which 8.1% were vacant. Among occupied housing units, 64.7% were owner-occupied and 35.3% were renter-occupied. The homeowner vacancy rate was 1.6% and the rental vacancy rate was 6.0%.

=== 2010 Census ===
The largest self-reported ancestry groups in Albemarle County are English 16.3%, German 16.0%, Irish 12.7%, "American" 11.4% and Italian 5.2%.

As of the census of 2010, there were 98,970 people, 38,157 households, and 24,578 families residing in the county. The population density was 137 people per square mile (53 people/km^{2}). There were 42,122 housing units at an average density of 58 units per square mile (22 units/km^{2}). The racial makeup of the county was 80.6% White, 9.7% Black or African American, 0.3% Native American, 4.7% Asian, 0.1% Pacific Islander, 2.3% from other races, and 2.4% from two or more races. 5.5% of the population were Hispanic or Latino of any race.

There were 38,157 households, out of which 28.2% had children under the age of 18 living with them, 51.4% were married couples living together, 9.6% had a female householder with no husband present, and 35.6% were non-families. 28.0% of all households were made up of individuals, and 25.9% had someone living alone who was 65 years of age or older. The average household size was 2.41 and the average family size was 2.96.

In the county, the population was spread out, with 21.5% under the age of 18, 12.3% from 18 to 24, 24.7% from 25 to 44, 27.2% from 45 to 64, and 14.3% who were 65 years of age or older. The median age was 38.2 years. For every 100 females there were 92.69 males. For every 100 females aged 18 and over, there were 89.59 males.

22% of Albemarle residents have a graduate or professional degree, compared with 10% nationwide.

The median income for a household in the county was $63,001, and the median income for a family was $98,934. Males had a median income of $55,530 versus $52,211 for females. The per capita income for the county was $36,718. About 3.8% of families and 10.4% of the population were below the poverty line, including 8.0% of those under age 18 and 2.4% of those age 65 or over.

== Economy ==
35% of people working in Albemarle live in the county, while 65% commute in. 19% of those commuting in live in Charlottesville, while the remainder live in the surrounding counties. 26,800 people commute out of Albemarle for work. 48% of which commute to Charlottesville, making up 51% of Charlottesville's in-commuters. In 2022, Albemarle had a 2.7% unemployment rate, compared with a national rate of 3.6%.

The top 10 employers as of Q4 2022 were:

1. University of Virginia
2. Sentara Healthcare
3. U.S. Department of Defense
4. County of Albemarle
5. Crutchfield Corporation
6. Walmart
7. Piedmont Virginia Community College
8. Northrop Grumman Corporation
9. Boar's Head Inn
10. Atlantic Coast Athletic Club

== Government ==
Albemarle is governed by an elected six-member Board of Supervisors. Management of the county is vested in a Board-appointed County Executive.

Board of Supervisors of Albemarle County
Name	Party	First election	District
Jim Andrews (chair)	Dem	2021	Samuel Miller
Diantha McKeel	Dem	2013	Jack Jouett
Mike Pruitt	Dem	2023	Scottsville
Ned Gallaway	Dem	2017	Rio
Ann Mallek	Dem	2007	White Hall
Bea LaPisto-Kirtley	Dem	2019	Rivanna

There are also several elected Constitutional Officers:

- Clerk of the Circuit Court: John Zug (D)
- Commonwealth's Attorney: James M. Hingeley (D)
- Sheriff: Chan Bryant (D)

The nonpartisan School Board is also elected. Its members are:

- Kate Acuff (Jack Jouett Magisterial District)
- Chuck Pace (Rio Magisterial District)
- Judy Le (Rivanna Magisterial District; chair)
- Graham Paige (Samuel Miller Magisterial District)
- Ellen Osborne (Scottsville Magisterial District)
- Rebecca Berlin (White Hall Magisterial District)
- Allison Spillman (At-Large)

=== Emergency services ===
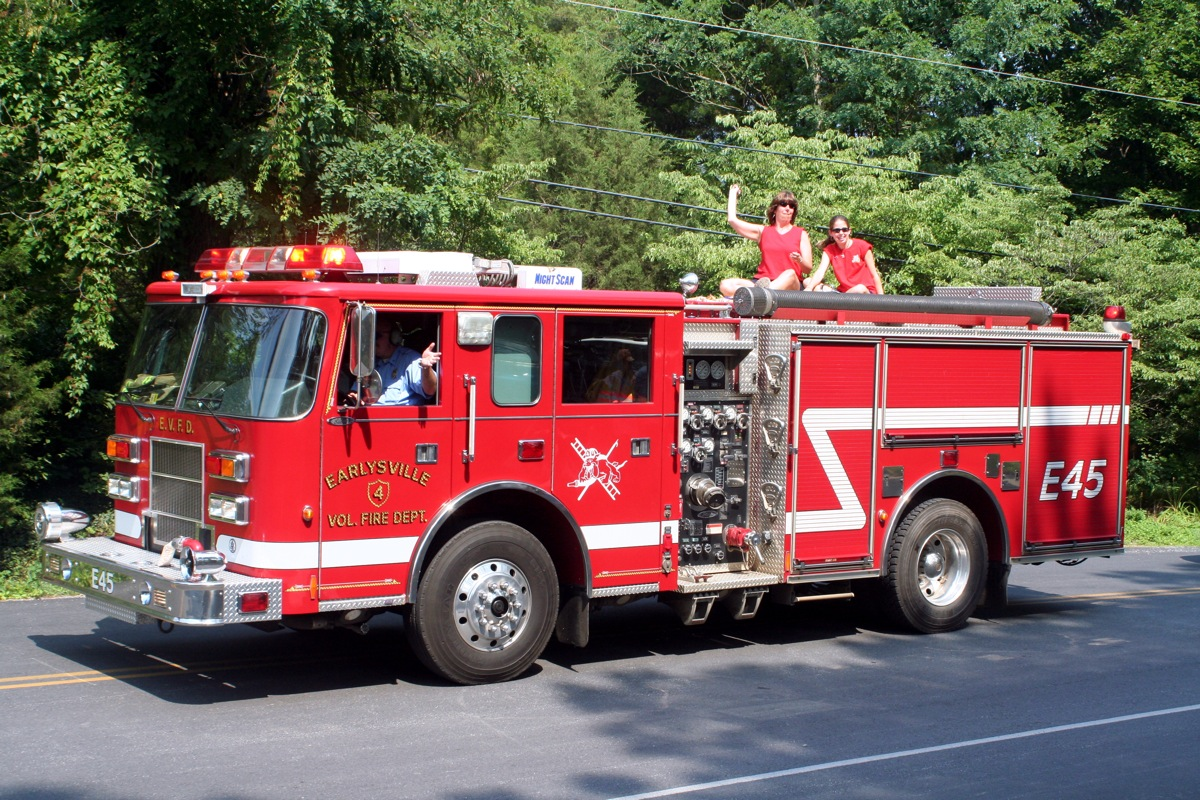
Earlysville Volunteer Fire Company Engine 45 at the Independence Day Parade.

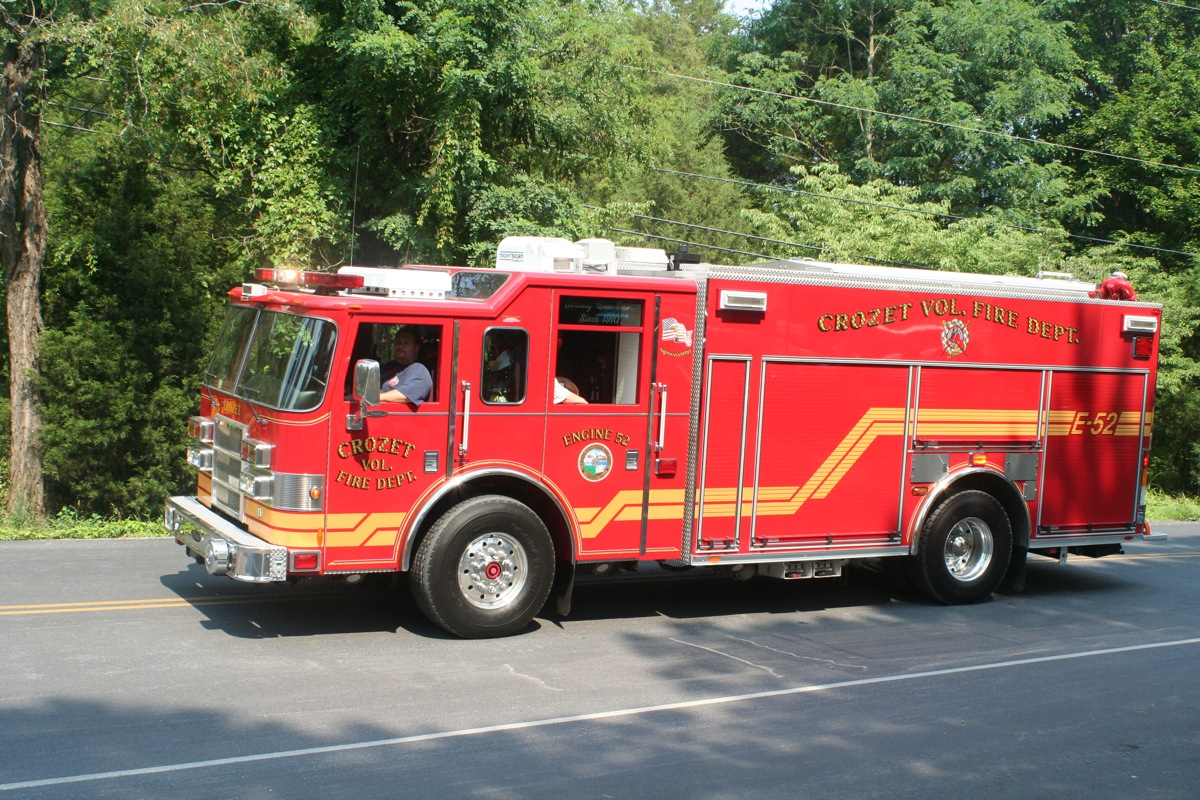
Crozet Volunteer Fire Department Engine 52 truck during the same parade.

Albemarle County has two branches of law enforcement, the Albemarle County Police Department, which handles criminal matters and is directed by the appointed police chief, Colonel Sean Reeves. The second branch is the Albemarle County Sheriff's Office, which handles civil service in the county, and they are directed by the elected Sheriff Chan Bryant.

Albemarle County Fire Rescue (ACFR) provides essential emergency services to the residents and visitors of Albemarle County including, fire suppression, emergency medical treatment, and transport, technical rescue, water rescue, and hazardous materials mitigation. In addition, the department provides a wide array of non-emergency services such as investigations, business inspections, burn permits, child safety seat inspections, smoke detector installations, public education, and emergency management.

Services are provided through a combination of career staff, nine volunteer fire and rescue agencies, and regional partners. Fire and rescue stations are placed strategically throughout the county to ensure proper coverage:

==== Fire stations ====
- East Rivanna Volunteer Fire Company – Station 2 – (combination career/volunteer)
- North Garden Volunteer Fire Company – Station 3 – (combination career/volunteer)
- Earlysville Volunteer Fire Company – Station 4 – (combination career/volunteer)
- Crozet Volunteer Fire Department – Station 5 – (combination career/volunteer)
- Stony Point Volunteer Fire Company – Station 6 – (combination career/volunteer)
- Scottsville Volunteer Fire Department – Station 7 – (volunteer)
- Seminole Trail Volunteer Fire Department – Station 8 – (combination career/volunteer)
- Charlottesville–Albemarle Airport Department of Public Safety – Station 9 – (career)
- Monticello Fire Rescue – Station 11 – (career)
- Hollymead Fire Rescue – Station 12 – (career)
- Ivy Fire Rescue – Station 15 – (career)
- Pantops Fire Rescue – Station 16 – (career)

==== Rescue squads ====
- Charlottesville-Albemarle Rescue Squad – Rescue 1 – (volunteer)
- Western Albemarle Rescue Squad – Rescue 5 – (volunteer)
- Scottsville Rescue – Rescue 17 – (career)
- Berkmar Rescue – Rescue 18 – (career)

1. Combination career/volunteer – stations supplemented by career staff Monday - Friday, 6 AM - 6 PM. Volunteers operate these stations weeknights from 6 PM - 6 AM as well as weekends and holidays
2. Volunteer – stations that operate with an all-volunteer, 24/7 team.
3. Career – stations that operate with an all-career, 24/7 shift that work three distinct schedules

=== Law enforcement ===
The Albemarle County Sheriff's Office (ACSO) and the Albemarle County Police Department (ACPD) provide law enforcement services in the county.

The ACSO was created in 1745 when Joseph Thompson was appointed as the first sheriff. Then in 1895, citizens started electing sheriffs for 4-year terms. Lucian Watts was the first elected sheriff. As of 2022 the sheriff is Chan Bryant, the county's first woman sheriff.

The ACPD was created in 1983. Prior to 1983, local county governments could create a police force by a simple vote held by their respective board of supervisors. In February 1983 the Virginia General Assembly restricted the authority of county governments to create police forces without a voter referendum. The law did not go into effect until July 1983: On May 11, 1983, before the law took effect, the Albemarle County Board of Supervisors passed an ordinance creating the Albemarle County Police Department. That original ordinance provided for a police chief and five full time officers. George W. Bailey was the first chief of police. As of 2022 the chief of police is Sean Reeves. The ACPD currently has 140 sworn officers, 23 civilian employees, and 3 animal control officers.

=== Representation and elections ===
Albemarle is represented by Democrat Creigh Deeds in the Virginia State Senate; Democrats Katrina Callsen and Amy Laufer represent the county in the Virginia House of Delegates. Republican John McGuire represents most of the county in the U.S. House of Representatives. Democrat Eugene Vindman represents a small sliver in the most northwestern portion of Albemarle County.

For much of the second half of the 20th century, Albemarle County was heavily Republican, like most of this part of Virginia. However, the Republican edge narrowed significantly in the 1990s, in part due to the influence of the University of Virginia. In 2004, John Kerry carried it by two points, becoming the first Democrat to win the county since 1948. It swung hard to Barack Obama in 2008, and since then, it has become one of the few Democratic bastions in central Virginia, though it is not as overwhelmingly Democratic as Charlottesville.

United States presidential election results for Albemarle County, Virginia
Year	Republican		Democratic		Third party(ies)	
Year	No.	%	No.	%	No.	%
1880	1,644	40.31%	2,432	59.64%	2	0.05%
1884	2,587	46.80%	2,941	53.20%	0	0.00%
1888	2,166	45.58%	2,573	54.15%	13	0.27%
1892	1,795	39.18%	2,757	60.18%	29	0.63%
1896	1,918	41.50%	2,628	56.86%	76	1.64%
1900	1,674	40.78%	2,411	58.73%	20	0.49%
1904	309	22.18%	1,069	76.74%	15	1.08%
1908	380	27.03%	999	71.05%	27	1.92%
1912	144	9.58%	1,215	80.84%	144	9.58%
1916	223	13.95%	1,376	86.05%	0	0.00%
1920	541	25.42%	1,587	74.58%	0	0.00%
1924	366	20.31%	1,383	76.75%	53	2.94%
1928	846	35.00%	1,571	65.00%	0	0.00%
1932	508	20.39%	1,949	78.24%	34	1.36%
1936	635	25.74%	1,825	73.98%	7	0.28%
1940	804	32.71%	1,648	67.05%	6	0.24%
1944	964	35.69%	1,725	63.87%	12	0.44%
1948	984	40.28%	1,178	48.22%	281	11.50%
1952	2,523	60.32%	1,642	39.25%	18	0.43%
1956	2,508	57.18%	1,412	32.19%	466	10.62%
1960	3,135	59.47%	2,102	39.87%	35	0.66%
1964	3,251	51.48%	3,062	48.49%	2	0.03%
1968	4,512	53.45%	2,255	26.71%	1,674	19.83%
1972	8,447	65.22%	4,303	33.23%	201	1.55%
1976	9,084	54.62%	7,310	43.95%	238	1.43%
1980	10,424	53.23%	7,293	37.24%	1,865	9.52%
1984	14,455	64.16%	7,982	35.43%	93	0.41%
1988	15,117	58.70%	10,363	40.24%	273	1.06%
1992	13,894	43.69%	13,886	43.66%	4,024	12.65%
1996	15,243	48.81%	14,089	45.12%	1,896	6.07%
2000	18,291	49.64%	16,255	44.12%	2,300	6.24%
2004	21,189	48.46%	22,088	50.51%	449	1.03%
2008	20,576	40.36%	29,792	58.43%	616	1.21%
2012	23,297	43.22%	29,757	55.20%	853	1.58%
2016	19,259	33.95%	33,345	58.78%	4,122	7.27%
2020	20,804	32.18%	42,466	65.68%	1,387	2.15%
2024	21,513	32.00%	44,279	65.87%	1,432	2.13%

== Education ==
The Albemarle County Public School System operates public education in the county. It provides education to nearly 14,000 students including preschool through high school. The Albemarle County Public School System's mission is to "establish a community of learners and learning, through relationships, relevance and rigor, one student at a time." ACPS provides 25 school facilities which include Community Lab School, a charter school that is located in the City of Charlottesville, Albemarle High School, Western Albemarle High School, and Monticello High School. The School Board and the Superintendent, Matthew Haas, work closely together in operating the Albemarle County Public School System.

Many private schools in Albemarle serve the county and students from surrounding areas. These include:

- The Covenant School (upper campus)
- Field School of Charlottesville
- Free Union Country School
- The Miller School of Albemarle
- Montessori Community School
- North Branch School
- Peabody School
- Charlottesville Catholic School
- St. Anne's-Belfield School
- Tandem Friends School

Some students attend several private schools in the City of Charlottesville.

Jefferson-Madison Regional Library is the regional library system that provides services to the citizens of Albemarle.

Portions of the University of Virginia are located within Albemarle County.

== Communities ==
The city of Charlottesville is enclaved within Albemarle County. Under Virginia law in effect since 1871, all municipalities in the state incorporated as cities are legally and politically independent of any county.

(Population according to the 2020 United States census)

=== Towns === : 1. Scottsville, the original county seat (524) (also in Fluvanna County)		=== Census-designated places === : 1. Afton (313) new in 2020 (also in Nelson County); 2. Crozet (9,224); 3. Earlysville (1,153) new in 2020; 4. Esmont (491); 5. Free Union (187); 6. Hollymead (8,601); 7. Ivy (917); 8. Keswick (321) new in 2020; 9. North Garden (461) new in 2020; 10. Pantops (4,682); 11. Piney Mountain (1,880); 12. Rio (2,076) new in 2020; 13. Rivanna (east county) (2,174); 14. University of Virginia (7,704)
=== Unincorporated communities ===
Advance Mills; Alberene; Ardwood; Arrowhead; Barracks; Barterbrook; Batesville; Bedford Hills; Bellair; Bentivar; Berkeley; Berkmar; Blenheim; Boiling Spring; Boonesville; Branchland; Briarwood; Brinnington; Brookwood; Brownsville; Browntown; Burnley	Camelot; Campbell; Carrsbrook; Cash Corner; Cedarmere; Chapel Hills; Chestnut Grove; Cismont; Clover Hill; Cobham; Colthurst; Commonwealth; Country Green; Covesville; Damon; Davis Shop; Doylesville; Earlysville Heights; Eastham; Ednam; Ehart; Everettsville	Fairgrove; Farmington; Flordon; Franklin; Freetown; Gilbert; Glenaire; Glendower; Glenmore; Glenorchy; Greenfields; Greenwood; Hatton; Heards; Howardsville; Hunters Hall; Hydraulic; Inglecress; Keene; Key West; Langford; Lexington	Liberty Hill; Lindsay; Little Clover Hill; Loch Leigh; Mallard Lake; McCullough; Meriwether Hill; Midway; Midway; Mill Ridge; Mill Run; Millington; Milton; Milton Heights; Milton Hills; Miran Forest; Montvue; Mountfair; Newtown; Nob Hill; Northfields	Nortonsville; Norwood; Oak Hill; Old Dominion; Overton; Owensville; Patterson Store; Peacock Hill; The Pines; Porters; Proffit; Queen Charlotte; Raintree; Redland; Rio Heights; Rivanna (north county); Rose Hill; Rosena; Rugby; Shadwell; Simeon; Solaris	Springfield; Squire Hill; Stillfield; Stonehenge; Stony Point; Tapscott; Terrybrook; Thurston; Townwood; Warren; Watts; Waverly; West Leigh; Westfield; Westmoreland; White Hall; Wildwood; Wilhait; Willoughby; Windrift; Woodbrook; Woodridge; Yancey Mills

Many of these unincorporated areas have Charlottesville addresses.

== Notable people ==
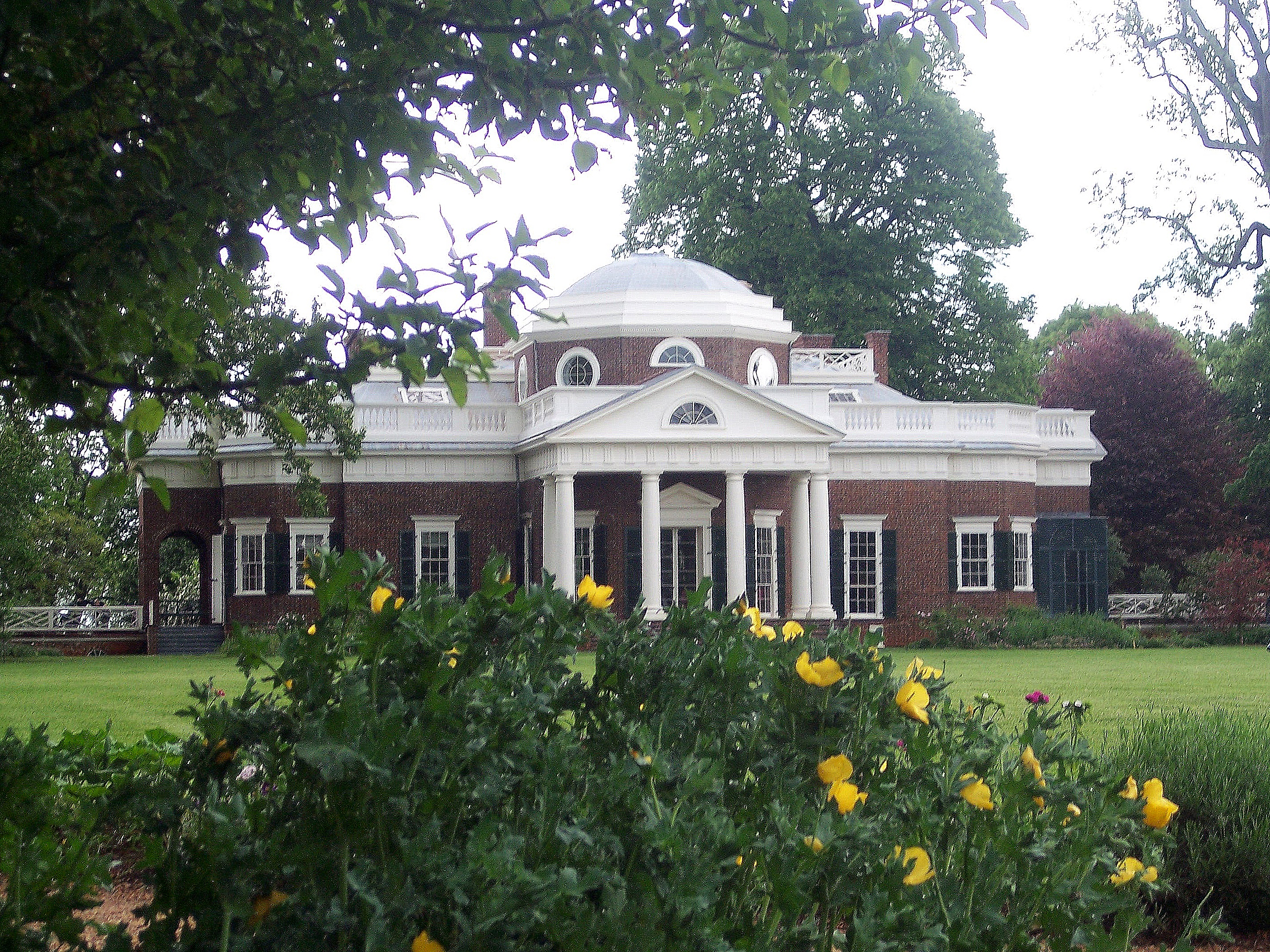
United States President and Governor of Virginia Thomas Jefferson's home, Monticello, is located in Albemarle County.

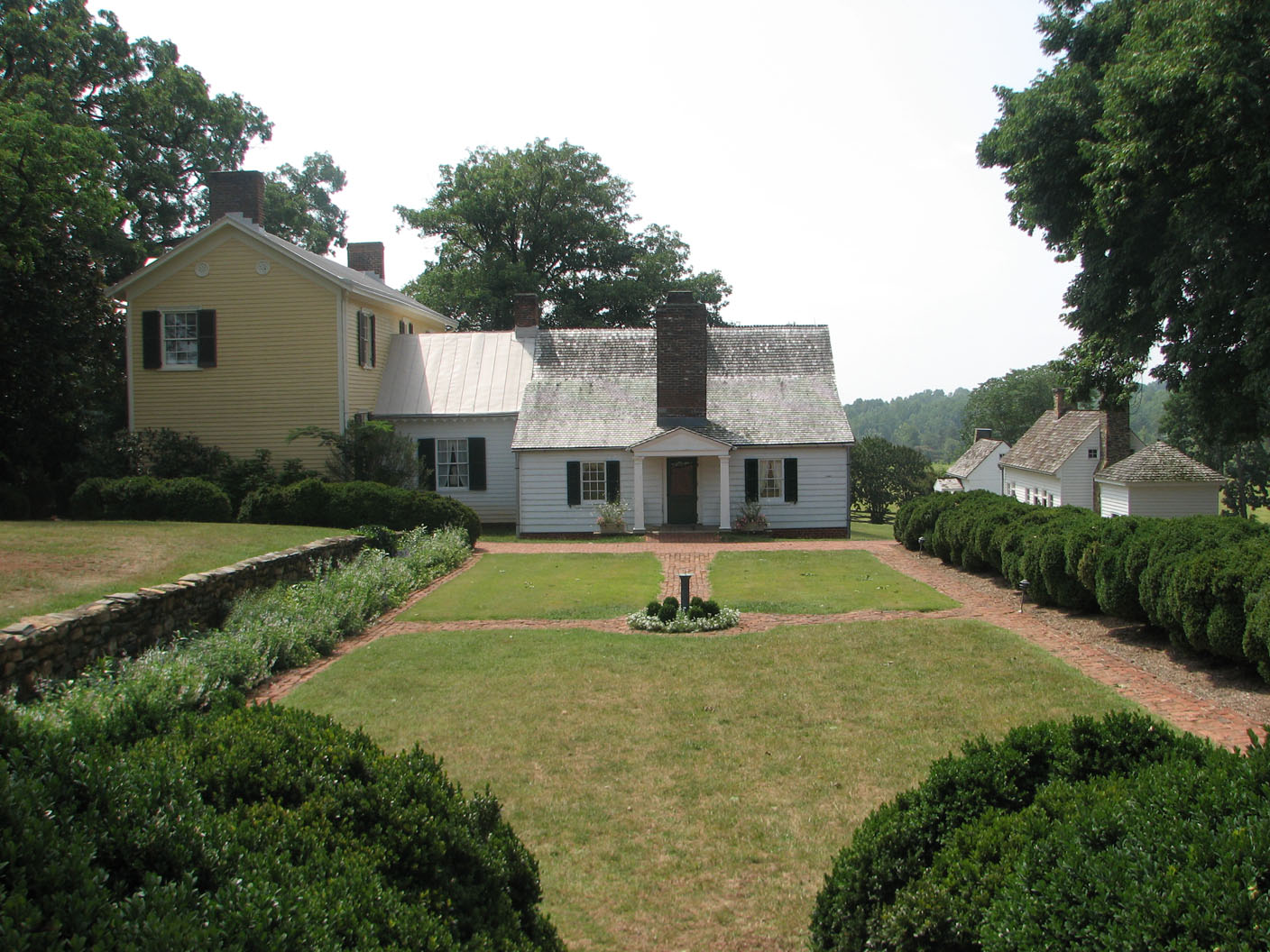
United States President and Governor of Virginia James Monroe's home, Ash Lawn-Highland, is located in Albemarle County.

- Chilton Allan (1786–1858), born in Albemarle County, United States Congressman from Kentucky
- Rev Samuel Black, Albemarle County's first Presbyterian minister. Built Sam Black's Tavern
- Dabney Smith Carr (1802–1854), born in Albemarle County, founder of newspaper Baltimore Republican and Commercial Advertiser, United States minister to Turkey
- Abraham Childers (1750–1849), born in Albemarle County, Continental Army soldier and member of the Kentucky Senate
- Christopher Henderson Clark (1767–1828), United States Congressman from Virginia
- George Rogers Clark (1752–1818), surveyor, soldier, and Revolutionary War hero and older brother of William Clark born in Albemarle County
- William Coleman, Olympic equestrian team member 2012
- Edward Coles (1786–1868), born in Albemarle County, second Governor of Illinois
- Rita Dove (born 1952), former United States Poet Laureate and winner of the Pulitzer Prize for Poetry, living in Albemarle County since 1989
- Greensville Dowell (1822–1876), born in Albemarle County, noted physician, professor, and author
- Kathryn Erskine, National Book Award-winning novelist
- James T. Farley (1829–1886), born in Albemarle County, United States Senator from California
- William D. Gibbons (c. 1825–1886), Baptist minister, born in Albemarle County
- James Walker Gons (1812–1870), born in Albemarle County, Baptist church clergyman, later converting to Christian Church (Disciples of Christ), editor and publisher of church's Christian Intelligencer, educator
- John Grisham, author of The Whistler and A Time to Kill
- Claude Hall, historian who wrote definitive biography of Abel Parker Upshur
- John Harvie (1742–1807), born in Albemarle County, member of the Continental Congress and mayor of Richmond, Virginia from 1785 to 1786
- Samuel Hopkins (1753–1819), born in Albemarle County, United States Army officer and United States Congressman from Kentucky
- Thomas Jefferson, third President of the United States and former Governor of Virginia
- Sarah Garland Boyd Jones (1866–1905), physician
- Jack Jouett (1754–1822), born in Albemarle County, known as the "Paul Revere of the South", influential in organizing Kentucky as a separate state, Virginia and Kentucky state legislator
- Fiske Kimball (1888–1955), architectural historian, founder of the University of Virginia School of Architecture
- Ben King (cyclist), professional cyclist
- Walter Leake (1762–1825), born in Albemarle County, United States Senator from Mississippi and later governor of that state
- Meriwether Lewis (1774–1809), born in Albemarle County, explorer, governor of Louisiana, and one of the leaders of the Lewis and Clark Expedition
- Howie Long, former NFL player with the Oakland Raiders
- Joseph Martin (1740–1808), Revolutionary War general and explorer; namesake of Martinsville, Virginia
- Dave Matthews of the Dave Matthews Band
- David Meriwether, born in Albemarle County, Continental Army officer, member United States Congress, Speaker of the Georgia House of Representatives, Major General - Georgia Militia
- John Milbank, English philosopher and theologian
- James Monroe, fifth President of the United States and former Governor of Virginia
- James Monroe (1799–1870), born in Albemarle County, United States Congressman from New York
- Lottie Moon (1840–1912), Southern Baptist missionary to China; Southern Baptists worldwide take up a Christmas offering every year for international missions in her name
- James Morris Page (1864–1936), mathematics professor and chairman of University of Virginia
- Sissy Spacek, actress
- Peter Threewits (1725–1770), born in Sussex County, Virginia state legislator
- Bebe Williams, Xeric Award cartoonist/artist Art Comics Daily

== See also ==
- National Register of Historic Places listings in Albemarle County, Virginia
