= Buck Mountain =

Buck Mountain may refer to:

- Buck Mountain (Lassen, California) (8,634 feet), in the Warner Mountains
- Buck Mountain (Palisades, California) (12,841 feet), in the Central Sierra Nevada
- Buck Mountain (Colorado) (11,396 feet), in the Rocky Mountain's Park Range
- Buck Mountain (Iron County, Missouri) (1,624 feet), in the Ozark Highlands
- Buck Mountain (Madison County, Missouri) (1,129 feet), in the Ozark Highlands
- Buck Mountain (St. Francois County, Missouri) (1,529 feet), in the Ozark Highlands
- Buck Mountain (Montana) (3,327 feet), in the Pine Hills
- Buck Mountain (Nevada) (9,159 feet), in the Ruby Mountains
- Buck Mountain (Fort Ann, New York) (2,334 feet), in the Eastern Adirondacks
- Buck Mountain (Long Lake, New York) (2,392 feet), South of Tupper Lake
- Buck Mountain (Indian Lake, New York) (2,631 feet), in the Central Adirondacks
- Buck Mountain (Saratoga, New York) (2,700 feet), in the Southern Adirondacks
- Buck Mountain (Tupper Lake, New York) (2,917 feet), in the Northwest Adirondacks
- Buck Mountain (Columbia, Oregon) (2,134 feet), in the Northern Oregon Coast Range
- Buck Mountain (Pennsylvania) (1,942 feet), in the Ridge-and-Valley Appalachians
- Buck Mountain (Tennessee) (3,900 feet), in the Blue Ridge Mountains
- Buck Mountain (Virginia) (4,670 feet), in the Blue Ridge Mountains
- Buck Mountain (Washington) (8,533 feet), in the North Cascades
- Buck Mountain (Jefferson, Washington) (3,780 feet), in the Eastern Olympic Mountains
- Buck Mountain (Wyoming) (11,943 feet), in Grand Teton National Park

== See also ==
- Buck Mountain Episcopal Church
- Buck Peak (disambiguation)
