= Frederick Hatch =

Frederick Hatch may refer to:

- Frederick W. Hatch (clergy) (1789–1860) American Episcopal clergyman and Chaplain of the United States Senate
- Frederick W. Hatch (physician) (1821–1884) American physician, educator, and medical pioneer of Sacramento, California
- Frederick W. Hatch (psychiatrist) (1849–1924) American psychiatrist, eugenicist, and General Superintendent of State Hospitals in California
- Fred M. Hatch (1877–1932), American football coach, athletics administrator, and educator
