= Free Union, Virginia =

Free Union
- Census-designated place
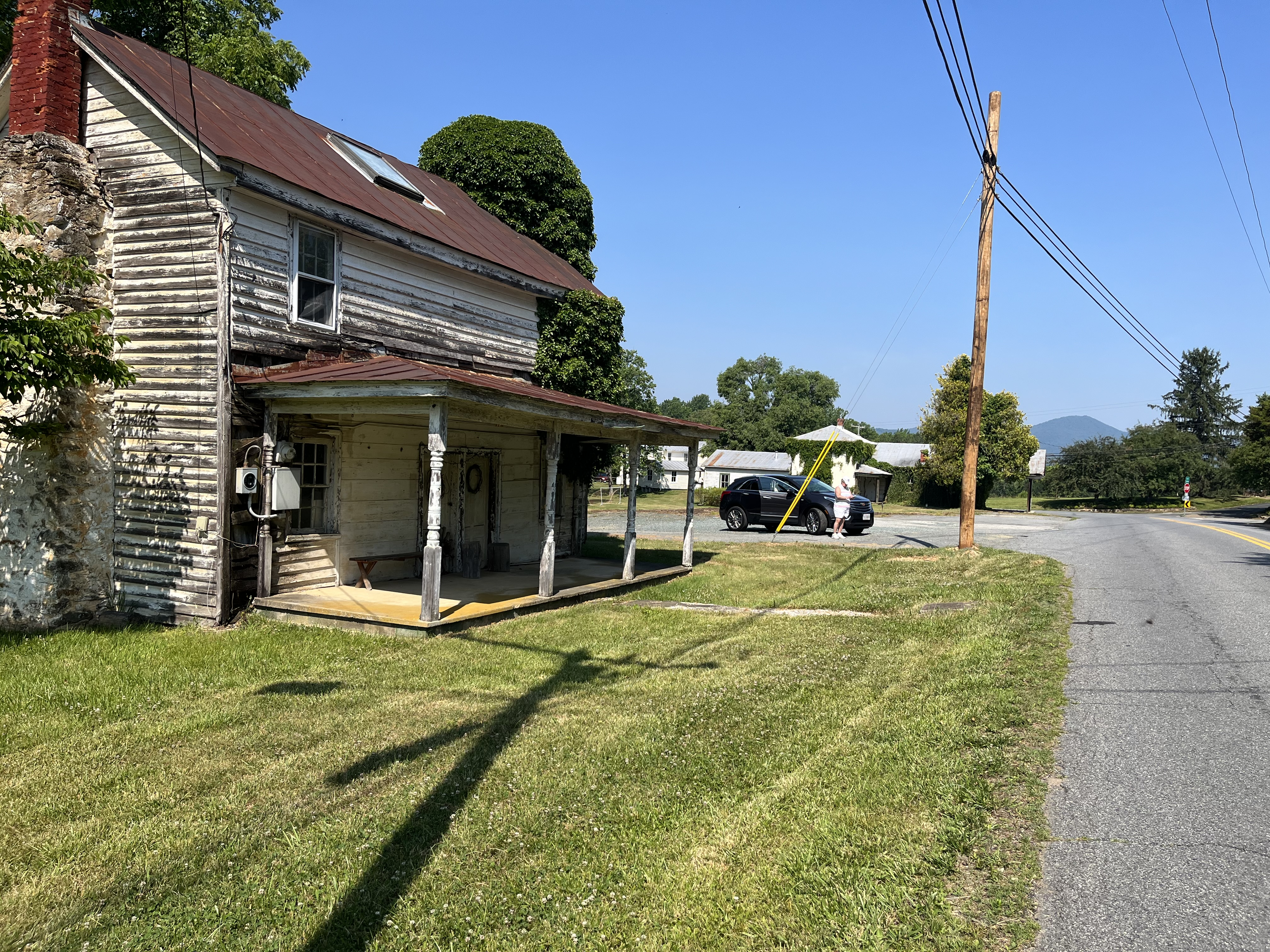
- Village center, 2023

- Location of the Free Union CDP within the Albemarle county

- Location within the Commonwealth of Virginia Free Union (the United States)
- Coordinates: 38°9′17″N 78°33′52″W
- Country: United States
- State: Virginia
- County: Albemarle
- Nominally settled: 1761
- Named for: Free Union Baptist Church
- Elevation: 590 ft (180 m)

Population (2020)
  - Total: 187
- Time zone: UTC−5 (Eastern (EST))
  - Summer (DST): UTC−4 (EDT)
- ZIP codes: 22940
- GNIS feature ID: 2629023

Free Union is a census-designated place (CDP) in Albemarle County, Virginia, United States, ten miles north-northwest of Charlottesville.

The population as of the 2020 Census was 187. It is a small hamlet consisting of a private school (Free Union Country School), a doctor's office, a post office, a homebuilder, and several dozen homes. Otherwise it is entirely rural in character.

== History ==
The area was first settled in the mid-18th century. In 1761, the region became a part of Albemarle County. Free Union was originally referred to as "Nicksville" after a free slave named Nick, who opened a blacksmith shop there in the early 19th century. When a post office was established in 1847, it was given the name of Free Union to avoid confusion with Nixville, another post office in the county. The name was taken from that of the Free Union Church, which had been built in 1837 and is still operating as the Free Union Baptist Church. The church was "free" in that all races were welcome to worship there, and it was a "union" of four denominations of Christianity, none of which could have afforded a church of their own at that time. Including both Black and White members on the church roles was customary, as Black people were usually the enslaved property of church members. According to a history, "Records for the Baptist congregation in 1859 noted 110 members: 69 White; 41 Black. Following the Civil War, the tradition of mixed-race congregations ceased in most churches, as African Americans finally were allowed to assemble together freely under the law." Free Union continued to be known as Nixville until the early 20th century, when the post office's name caught on.

The Ballard-Maupin House was added to the National Register of Historic Places in 1999.

=== Early settlement ===
Early family names here included Ballard, Burruss, Catterton, Harris, Maupin, Via, Rhodes and White (north of Millington as well as southeast of there). James Harris and wife Elizabeth obtained a land grant that included the area where Free Union stands today. They had six sons and five daughters and called the house, dated to 1755, "Meadow Bluffs." The last of the family was Reuben Harris. After the Civil War, he was forced to sell off some of the land. Several former enslaved people acquired small pieces of the land by working and receiving parcels as payment.

Daniel Maupin (1748-1788) lived in White Hall area on the Maupin Homeplace. His son Gabe lived on what is now called "Brakeheart Road" in Sugar Hollow until his death in 1794. His grandson Thomas Maupin was the first of the Maupin family to live in the Free Union area and lived just north of Wesley Chapel Church.

Another early settler was John Rodes (1697-1775), of New Kent, who acquired, for thirty-five pounds current money, 200 acres between the north and south forks of Moormans River, on March 10, 1761. Here, about one and a half miles southeast of Millington, Albemarle County, he established a tobacco plantation that became known as Midway, a historic home and farm.

In 1776, Cornelius (Conyers) White (1735-1802) of Orange County purchased 1500 acres around Buck Mountain Creek. He was the eldest son of John White, the emigrant of Leicestershire, who acquired a land grant in 1739 near the Swift Run Gap and Ruckersville. Conyers appears on the 1782 tax lists and likely built a log cabin about three miles southwest of the center of Free Union, at what today is known as the equestrian estate Fox Ridge Farm. With rolling pastureland and forest—between Mechums and Moormans Rivers—and overlooking the Blue Ridge, it neighbors Midway. Fox Ridge is about four miles east of what became the White Hall district of Albemarle County circa 1835, likely named for this family. In 1802, in the inventory of Conyers' estate were the following enslaved human beings with their monetary values (pound sterling): Ann and Child, £100. Phyllis, £90. Jacob, £100. Carver, £110. Jerry, £30. Fanny, £25. Stephen, £110 est. Ben, £100 est. Winnie, £90 est. Vilet, £90 est. Vilet Child One, £10 est. Vilet Child Two, £10 est. Vilet Child Three, £10 est. Vilet Child Four, £10 est.

Cornelius White’s eldest grandson, Crenshaw White, lived at Fox Ridge until he left for Missouri with his wife Sarah Austin in about 1825–the first of that branch of the White family to have settled in that State (Chariton County), the second being Crenshaw's brother James Early White (St. Catharine, Linn County) in the 1850s. Both sold their interests to their brother Anderson White (1794-1880), who with his wife Lucinda Huckstep (1802-1882), raised 12 children at Fox Ridge in Free Union and are buried in a family cemetery next to their house, known as the “Quaker cottage,” which remains. He raised hemp, flax and tobacco. His neighbor William Harris Rodes at Midway named an enslaved male after him.

=== Civil war ===
In 1860, Anderson White, grandson of Cornelius, owned 23 enslaved people at what is now Fox Ridge in Free Union. Anderson's son James Cornelius White lived on the plantation, and during the Civil War, “As the story goes, J.C. left a negro slave in charge who promised to look after the family's health and safety. Mildred, (Mrs. J.C.) was sickly and Union soldiers came and took the Negroes and anything else they wanted, leaving Mildred and her children alone. Edgar [son] was nine years old at the time and remembers the black man crying "Mazza, I can'ts help it! Mazza, I can'ts help it," as he was dragged away.” Anderson “lost nearly all his property and otherwise suffered” after the War. In 1870, there was a Black family living next to Anderson, likely some of his former slaves: George Mills, age 61, born 1809, is a “farm laborer,” with Susan Mills, 40, Dabney, 21, Elliot, 18, Ellen, 16, Sarah, 14, Edmund, 12, Lula, 9, Joseph, 5, and Grant, 1, all residents of Free Union, Albemarle County.

Anderson White inherited Sam, an enslaved male, upon his father's death in 1823. His father, James White (1761-1823), owned 24 slaves at death on his farm near Nortonsville and Dyke, just over the Albemarle border in then Orange County.

== Climate ==
The climate is characterized by relatively cold winters and evenly distributed precipitation throughout the year. The Köppen Climate Classification subtype for this climate is "Cfa" (Humid temperate hot summer Climate).

Climate data for Free Union, Virginia(1991-2020 normals)
Month	Jan	Feb	Mar	Apr	May	Jun	Jul	Aug	Sep	Oct	Nov	Dec	Year
Mean daily maximum °F (°C)	45.4 (7.4)	49.1 (9.5)	57.6 (14.2)	68.9 (20.5)	74.4 (23.6)	81.0 (27.2)	85.5 (29.7)	83.8 (28.8)	77.6 (25.3)	68.7 (20.4)	58.8 (14.9)	48.8 (9.3)	66.6 (19.2)
Daily mean °F (°C)	34.5 (1.4)	36.9 (2.7)	43.9 (6.6)	54.6 (12.6)	62.6 (17.0)	70.6 (21.4)	74.9 (23.8)	73.4 (23.0)	66.7 (19.3)	56.1 (13.4)	45.9 (7.7)	37.7 (3.2)	54.8 (12.7)
Mean daily minimum °F (°C)	23.6 (−4.7)	24.6 (−4.1)	30.1 (−1.1)	40.2 (4.6)	50.8 (10.4)	60.2 (15.7)	64.3 (17.9)	62.7 (17.1)	55.8 (13.2)	43.5 (6.4)	32.9 (0.5)	26.5 (−3.1)	42.9 (6.1)
Average precipitation inches (mm)	3.50 (89)	2.84 (72)	3.89 (99)	3.32 (84)	4.31 (109)	4.83 (123)	4.50 (114)	3.44 (87)	5.14 (131)	3.68 (93)	3.76 (96)	3.56 (90)	46.77 (1,187)
Source: NOAA

== Demographics ==
Historical population
Census	Pop.	Note	%±
2020	187		—
U.S. Decennial Census; 2010 2020

Free Union was first listed as a census designated place in the 2010 U.S. census.

== See also ==
- Free Union, a community-based website with local news and history
- Buck Mountain, near Free Union
