= Buck Mountain (Virginia) =

Mountain in Virginia, United States

Coordinates: 38°11′36.48″N 78°33′49.05″W

Buck Mountain is a summit in the Free Union area of Albemarle County, Virginia. Its elevation is 1,358 feet and 414 meters. It was named for the abundance of deer in the area. Buck Mountain is bounded by 776, 667 and 601, and 671 roads, as well as Buck Mountain Creek.

== History ==
The Buck Mountain Road was completed in 1748. Buck Mountain Episcopal Church was built in 1747 for the Frederick Parish. It is considered a "rare surviving example" from colonial Virginia of a simple wooden Anglican parish church. It was moved in 1860, before the American Civil War, to its current location.

A cemetery was established in Earlysville in the Buck Mountain area, along its creek. The history of the cemetery is not known, so it has been called Blue Mountain Creek Cemetery and Blue Mountain Cemetery. It is south of Allen Road, in an area that used to have a log house, barn, and corn crib. That area has reforested. The graves appear to be similar to 19th century cemeteries of poor white and black people. There are various markers and 10 carved fieldstones. The cemetery may have been decorated by yucca plants and Holly trees that are not native to the area.

Michie Tavern was established by William Michie, an immigrant from Scotland, in 1784. Besides operating as a tavern and a restaurant, it provided lodging as well, in the Buck Mountain area. It was moved near to Monticello in 1927. The Michie family ran the Michie's Tavern Plantation, a mill, and a general store.

== Buck Mountain Creek ==
Buck Mountain Creek is a stream that starts at the base of Buck Mountain, flows through Free Union and towards Rivanna River.

== See also ==
- Longwood (Earlysville, Virginia)
