= Pise =

Pise may refer to:

- Rammed earth, a building technique
- Pise, Bhiwandi, a village in Maharashtra, India
- Pisa, a city in Italy
- Charles Constantine Pise (1801–1866), a Catholic priest and writer

== See also ==
- Paise, previously also spelt pice, a monetary unit of South Asia
