= Roach River (Virginia) =

Coordinates: 38.22180°N 78.48057°W

Location
- Country: United States

Physical characteristics
- Source
  - location: Virginia

The Roach River is an 11.0-mile-long (17.7 km) tributary of the North Fork Rivanna River in the U.S. state of Virginia. It is part of the James River watershed.

It rises at Powell Gap in Shenandoah National Park and flows southeast, passing the communities of Bacon Hollow and Dyke. Flowing entirely within Greene County, it joins the Lynch River to form the North Fork of the Rivanna just north of the Albemarle County line.

== See also ==
- List of rivers of Virginia
