= St. Catharine, Missouri =

- Census-Designated Place
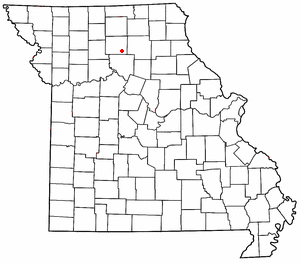
- Location of St. Catharine in Missouri
- Coordinates: 39°47′42″N 92°59′40″W
- Country: United States
- State: Missouri
- County: Linn

Area
  - Total: 0.74 sq mi (1.91 km^{2})
  - Land: 0.73 sq mi (1.90 km^{2})
  - Water: 0.0039 sq mi (0.01 km^{2})
- Elevation: 830 ft (250 m)

Population (2020)
  - Total: 78
  - Density: 106.4/sq mi (41.08/km^{2})
- FIPS code: 29-64046
- GNIS feature ID: 2587111

Saint Catharine or St. Catharine is an unincorporated community and census-designated place in southeast Linn County, Missouri, United States. As of the 2020 census, St. Catharine had a population of 78.

Saint Catharine is located approximately four miles east of Brookfield on Missouri Route 11 in the Yellow Creek Township. The Chicago, Burlington and Quincy Railroad passes the south side of the community.

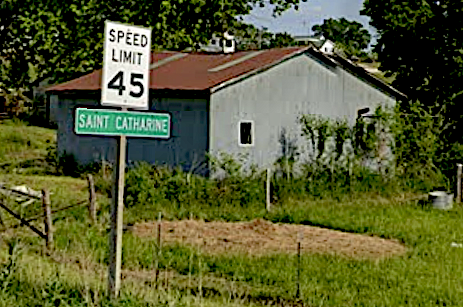
St. Catharine, unincorporated village in Linn County, Missouri

== History ==
An old stagecoach road ran near here, from Hannibal, Mo. to Saint Joseph, Mo., called the "Hound Dog Trail" and dates to the early 19th century. St. Catharine was founded in 1856, and is not named for Catherine of Alexandria, but instead for Mrs. Catharine Elliott, by her husband, William H. Elliott, a wealthy manufacturer. Both were born in England, and, with locals Caleb S. & Mary Farmer, joined in buying 160 acres, which was filed and recorded November 17, 1855. William and Catharine took the west half of 160 acres and laid out the town of Catharine. Afterward, the word Saint, or "St." as it was written, was added, "as a sort of joke, but as Mrs. Elliott remarked, she had no objection to being canonized as a saint, and the name became an established fact."

A post office named Saint Catharine was established in 1859, the same year that James Early White obtained land patent no.13685, which was signed October 10, 1859, by White and President James Buchanan for forty acres on which White established a tobacco farm five miles north of St. Catharine. He had become, seven months prior, the first postmaster of the village, on February 11, 1859.

That was just two days before the great fanfare marking the connection of the tracks of the western-headed line of the Hannibal and St. Joseph Railroad from Hannibal and the line coming eastward from St. Joseph, about thirty miles due west of St. Catharine at Chillicothe, Missouri, opening the first railroad to cross the state.

=== Postmaster ===
James Early White was born in 1804 near Dyke, in Greene County, Virginia, but the tobacco plantation on which he was born was closer to Nortonsville, in north Albemarle County. The youngest son of James White and Susanna Bourne, he was known as "Early" when his father bequeathed an enslaved girl named Keziah on the Virginia tobacco plantation when he was only 18 years old. He left the plantation in about 1852 after the death of his mother, and went with his wife and children to Illinois to stay near his wife's relatives, the Rosenberger family, then removed to the Yellow Creek Township.

His oldest brother Crenshaw White had established himself in Chariton County, to the immediate south of Linn, more than a quarter century earlier, in 1825, not but five years after Missouri was admitted to the Union as a slave state.

Another brother, Overton White, had drowned nearby, in the rushing Yellow Creek in Linn County, on his way to his wedding, in the spring of 1837. A third brother, Anderson White, remained in the Central Piedmont, on a tobacco plantation near the Blue Ridge in Free Union in Albemarle County.

James Early White--so named for the related First family of Virginia, that of Confederate General Jubal Anderson Early--brought his wife Matilda Rosenberger--born in Luray, Shenandoah County, Virginia, in 1810--and eight children from Virginia where he owned two slaves, according to the 1850 census and a family history. His great-granddaughter, Hattie Gertrude Lineberry Felt Carolan, wrote about his life in a family-circulated memoir entitled "These Are Your Ancestors" in 1970.

A few years after establishing a farm north of St. Catharine, two sons died within a month of one another (in 1864); another son spent time in the state asylum at Fulton, a daughter died as well. Two daughters, Matilda Elizabeth Kelley and Cynthia Ann Black, and son Wesley Anderson White, remained and raised families. Another son, James E. White Jr., joined the 26th Regiment of Illinois Volunteers and later the 6th Connecticut, participated in Sherman's march to the sea, and in 1865, he asked the Illinois governor to pardon him for desertion, which he did. The U.S. Army ignored the request.

Upon the death of James Sr., James Jr. and his wife Caroline Hortense Jackson, a descendant of Elizabeth Fones, took over the homestead five miles north of St. Catharine in 1881, at that point in time 160 acres. Matilda lived another two decades at the homestead.

A schoolhouse, called the White School, had been erected on a corner of their land in the 1870s. They raised five girls and five boys. Two of their daughters married and died young: one of a self-induced abortion, the other of syphilis in the Illinois State Asylum and Hospital for the Insane.

Five sons and three daughters, including Olive Pearl Lineberry, married and raised families. Olive married Frederick Lineberry, son of Wesley Lineberry, of Carroll County, Virginia, and Waconda Langwell, of Carroll County, Missouri. Wesley came to Linn county in 1866 after serving in the 29th regiment of the Virginia infantry.

James Sr. and Matilda and several of their sons are interred at the Linhart Chapel Cemetery to the southwest of the homestead. James Jr., Caroline and their daughter Winnie Lella White Clark and son Roy Ellsworth White are interred at Pleasant View Baptist Cemetery across Karlin Road from the homestead.

=== American civil war ===
In 1861, a farmer named James Maddox shot a hole through the American flag, raised at St. Catharine. "W. E. Crandall denounced the act in vigorous terms" and his threat to "take it down or tear it down was met by an equal determination to stand by the old flag." Crandall then took the flag down, "amid pretty heavy threats that it should not be done, and amid a silence profound, walked off with it."

In the summer 1863, near St. Catharine, a stranger suspected of being "a spy for the bushwhackers was taken into the Yellow Creek timber" and hung.

There were two Confederate raids made on St. Catharine: the first in August 1862 when seven raiders "robbed F. S. Black of about $1,000 in money and goods; W. T. Snow, of about $400; and the Salisbury Brothers and others suffered to a limited extent" though no one was hurt. The second raid occurred in September 1864, "in broad daylight," when about 15 to 20 raiders, under the command of Lieutenant Howard Bragg (under Capt. Clifton D. Holtzclaw), robbed generally, and took two men--one of whom was paroled, the other shot and buried by "citizens at the Corinth cemetery, in Chariton county." Also: "James Baxter, a blacksmith, was shot in the leg, a boy carrying water seriously wounded with a rifle-ball, and Lafayette Brashears wounded in the left leg with buckshot." James and Matilda's youngest son Jackson died September 4, possibly related to the raid. He was 19 years old.

=== Business (historical) ===
"The town is rather handsomely located with extensive prairies surrounding it, and in the distance rise the hills and low bluffs which line the banks of the East and West Yellow Creeks, which streams are, on the west about three miles, and on the east about one and a half miles from the town," according to a history.

There were two general stores, a hardware, stove and tinware shop, a notion and confectionary store, a gunsmith, blacksmith shops, wagon shops, a millinery, a shoe shop, a saw mill, harness shop, two coal mines, physician, railroad and express agent and the St. Catharine Hotel.

A post office was established at Hybrid, Missouri, north of St. Catharine and closer to the White homestead, near the Little Yellow Creek, but closed in 1905.

The Saint Catharine post office remained in operation until 1993.

U.S. 36 from St. Joseph to Hannibal is directly south and is called "The Way of American Genius" because at times J.C. Penney, John J. “Black Jack” Pershing, Walt Disney, Omar Bradley and Mark Twain lived along the route, not to mention Jesse James.

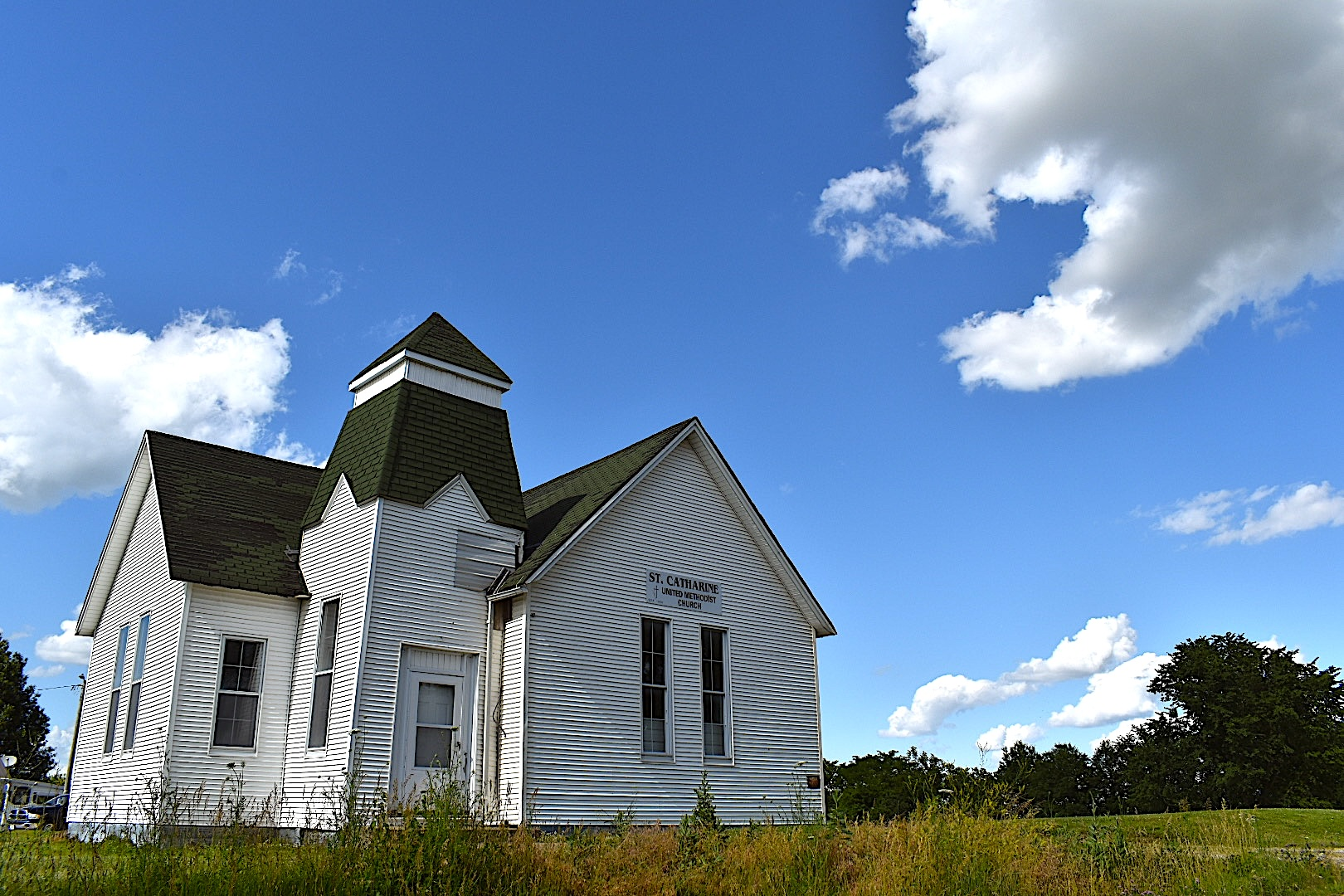
St. Catharine (Linn County, Missouri) United Methodist Church, established 1890, in 2020.

== Churches ==
In the 19th century, there were several Methodist Episcopal churches, several Congregational churches, and the Church of the United Brethren.

The St. Catharine United Methodist Church formed in 1890 and closed in 2008. The building no longer stands.

== Demographics ==
Historical population
Census	Pop.	Note	%±
2020	78		—
U.S. Decennial Census

St, Catherine first appeared as a census designated place in the 2020 U.S. census.
