= Buck Peak =

Buck Peak may mean:

- Buck Peak (Arizona), in the Cabeza Prieta Mountains
- Buck Peak (Diablo Range), in San Benito County, California
- Buck Peak (New Mexico), in the Magdalena Mountains
- Buck Peak (Oregon), the highest point in Multnomah County, Oregon
- Buck's Peak (Idaho), a mountain notable for being the location of Tara Westover's childhood home, as described in her memoir Educated

== See also ==
- Buck Mountain (disambiguation)
