= White Hall, Virginia =

White Hall is the name of some places in Virginia:

- White Hall, Albemarle County, Virginia
- White Hall, Frederick County, Virginia
