= Seego Hollow =

Valley in the US state of Missouri

Seego Hollow is a valley in southern St. Francois County in the U.S. state of Missouri. The headwaters of the intermittent stream in Seego Hollow arise between Buck Mountain and Bald Knob at 37°39′30″N 90°31′10″W. The stream confluence with Wachita Creek is at 37°39′27″N 90°29′09″W.

Seego Hollow has the name of the original owner of the site.
