= Michie Tavern =

Historic house in Virginia, United States

- U.S. National Register of Historic Places
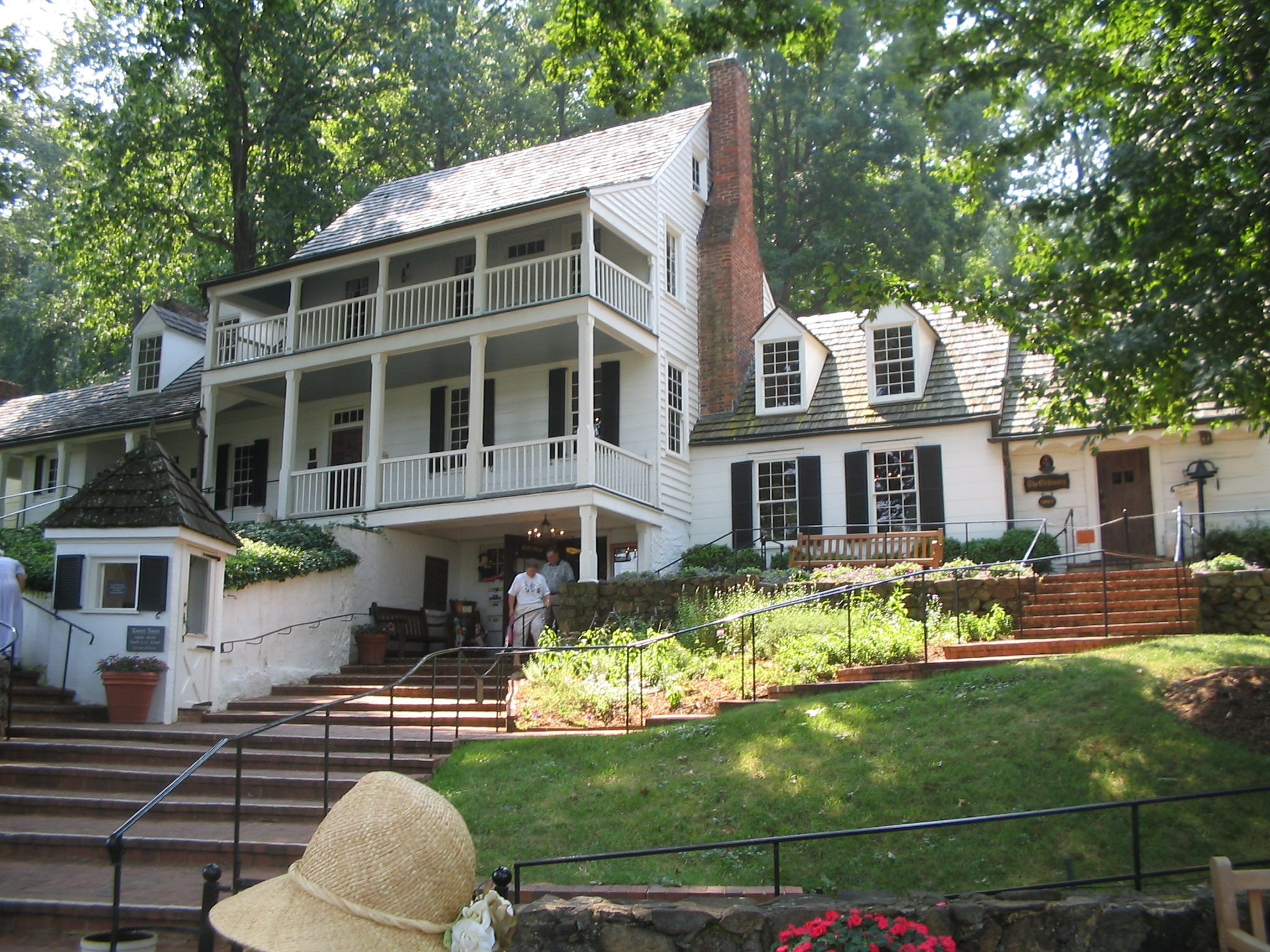
- Location: Albemarle County, Virginia
- Nearest city: Charlottesville
- Coordinates: 38°0′31.22″N 78°27′54.55″W
- Built: 1784
- NRHP reference No.: 86003913
- Added to NRHP: 1986

Michie Tavern (pronounced /ˈmɪki/), located in Albemarle County, Virginia, is a Virginia Historic Landmark that was established November 11, 1784 by Scotsman William Michie, though in Earlysville. The Tavern served as the social center of its community and provided travelers with food, drink and lodging. While ceasing operation as a tavern sometime between 1830 and 1850, it remained in the Michie family as a private home until, in 1910, it came to be owned by the Commonwealth of Virginia. In 1927, the Tavern was purchased by Josephine Henderson, who had it moved seventeen miles from Earlysville to its present location, close to Monticello.

== History ==
In 1746, Major John Henry sold land in northern Albemarle County to John Michie. His son, William Michie, inherited the property from his father and built a house. Many people came to his house looking for food and a place to sleep, so William obtained a license to operate an ordinary in 1784 and operated a tavern, inn, and restaurant. The property reverted to state ownership in 1910 when Sallie Michie was unable to care for the business. She was the last Michie family member to own the property. Josephine Henderson bought the tavern in 1927, and had it dismantled and moved near Monticello. Part of her interest in the tavern was to have a place to display her large collection of antiques. It was used as an architectural office by Milton Gregg beginning in 1932. The tavern was acquired by a local family in 1968, and the restaurant was started the following year. The Meadow Run Mill was moved from Augusta County and reconstructed on the property in 1976. The tavern was operated by the same family from 1968 until 2026 when it was sold to a local businessman.

== Overview ==
Michie Tavern is now a collection of historic buildings that includes a pub and restaurant. It has the largest grouping of reassembled buildings in Albemarle County. Now located near Monticello, it has retained the atmosphere of an 18th-century inn, pub, and a set of stores: The General Store and the Tavern Shop.

== Gallery ==
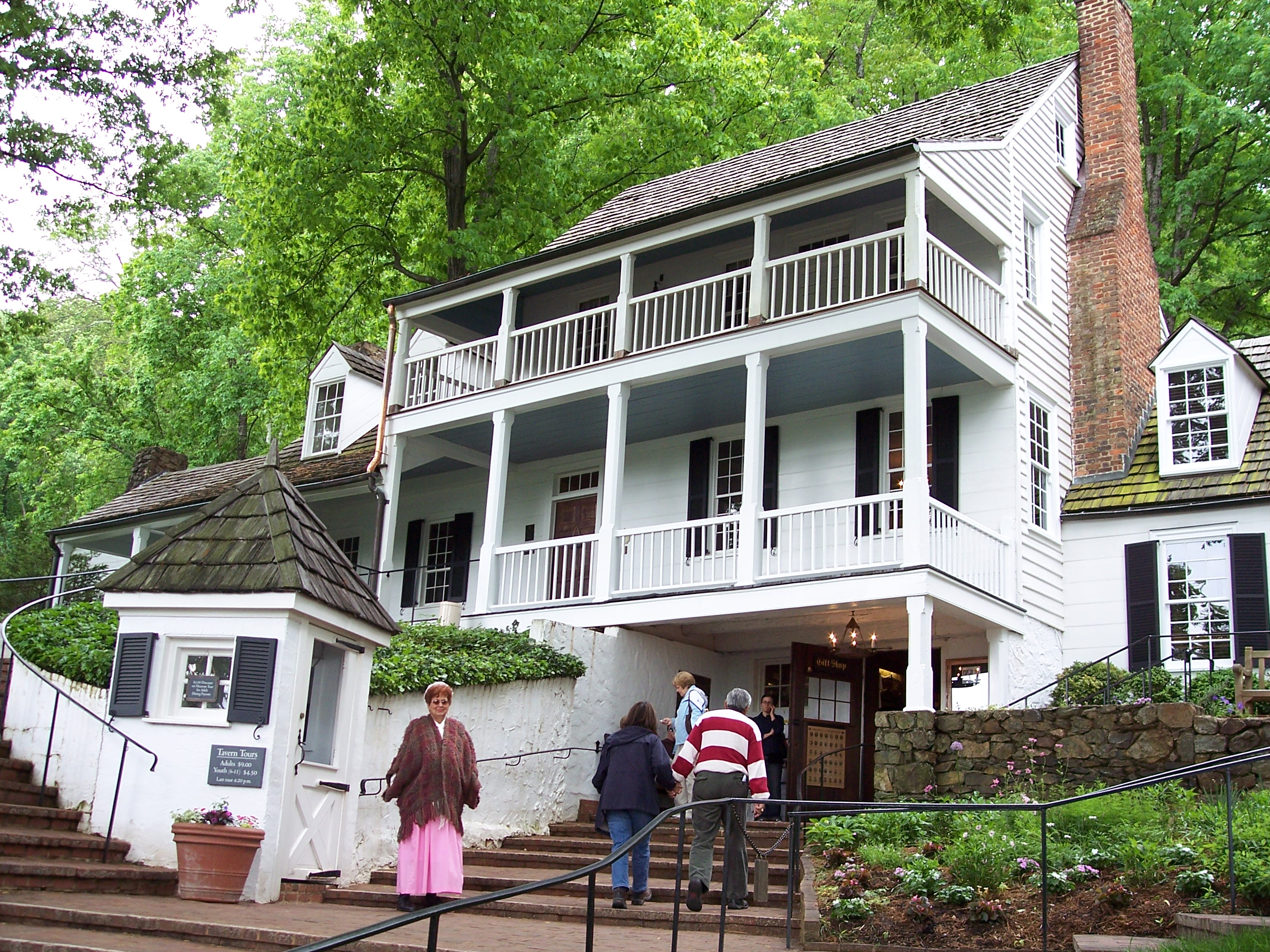
Michie Tavern

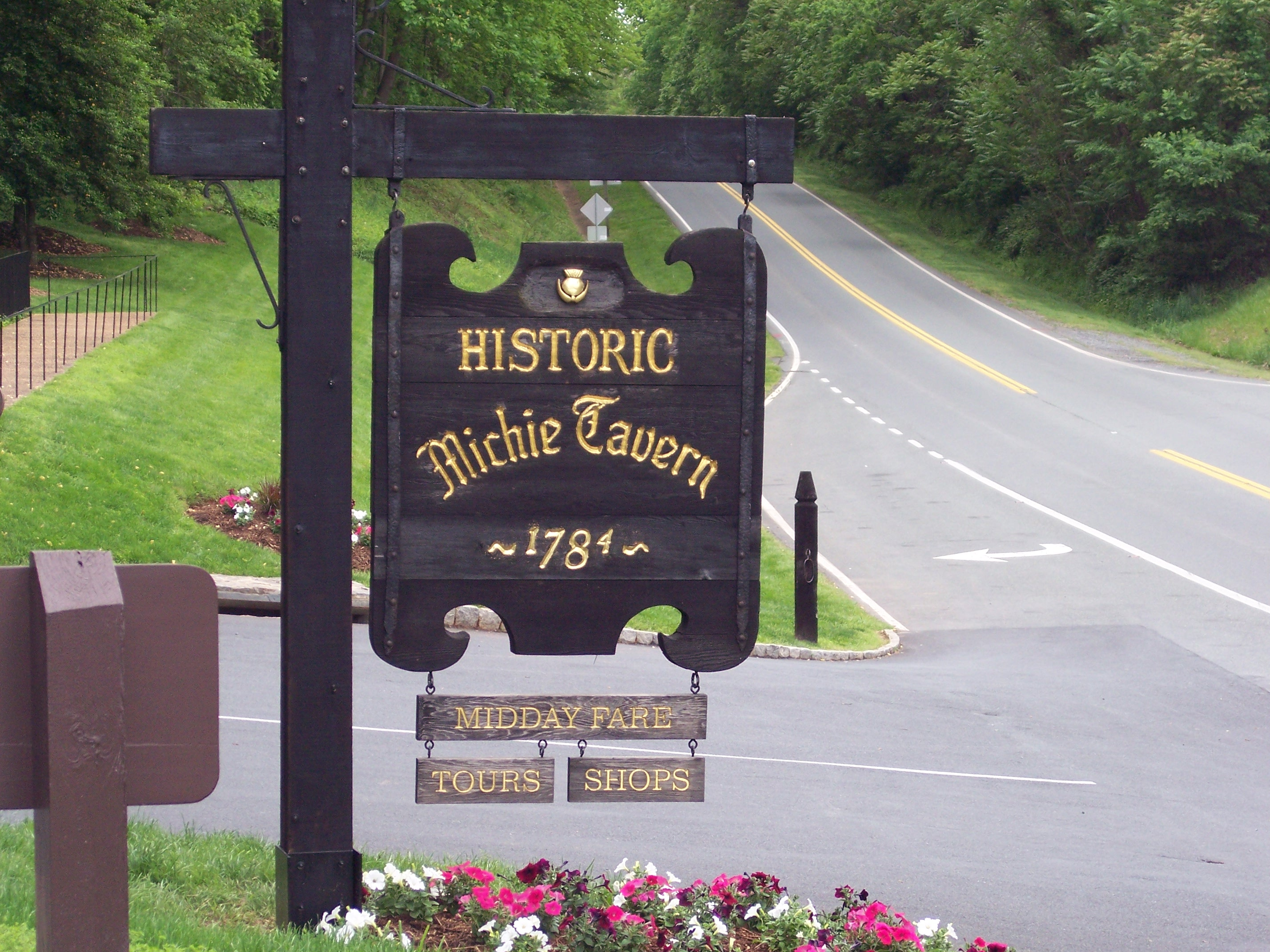
Michie Tavern

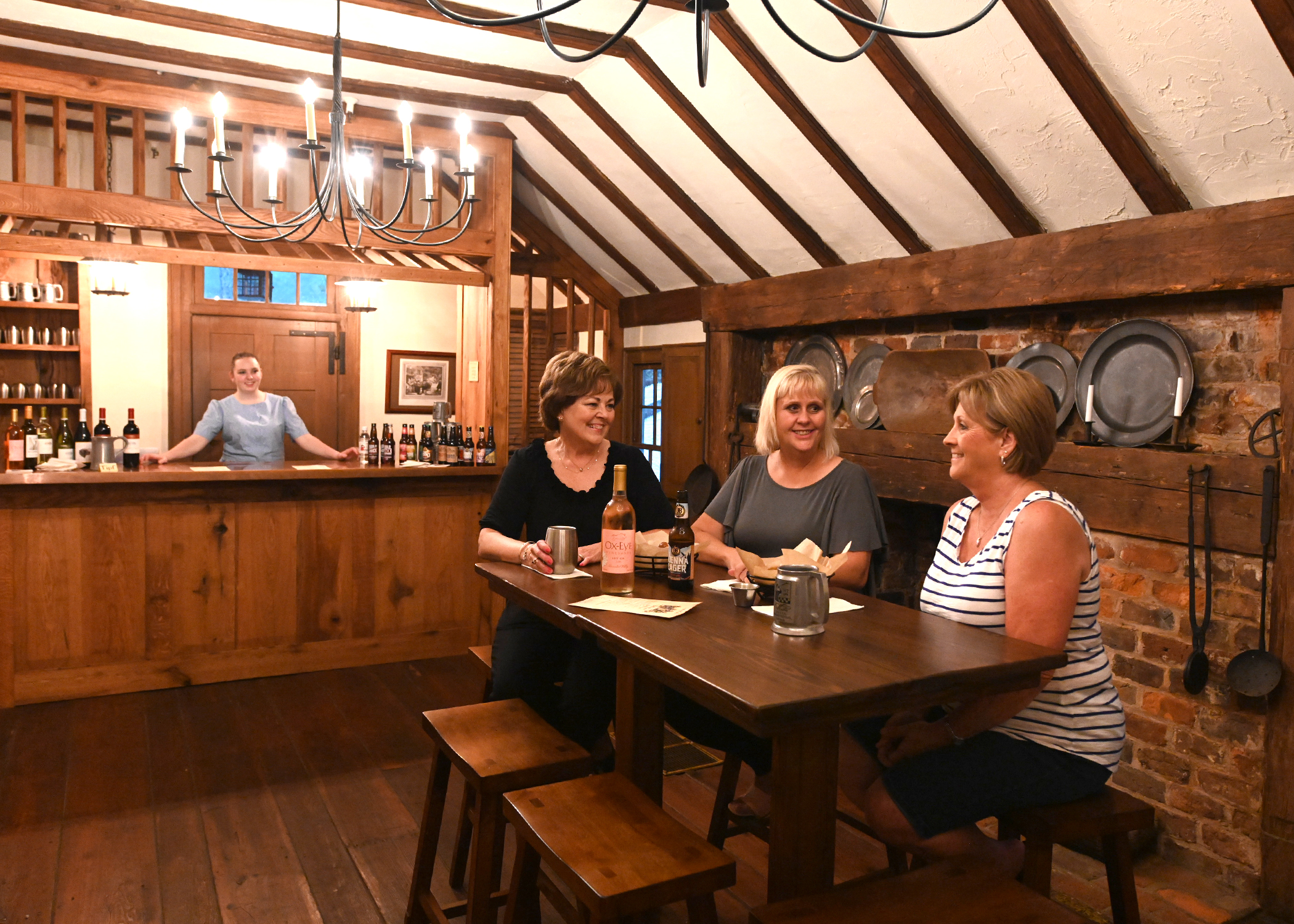
1784 Pub

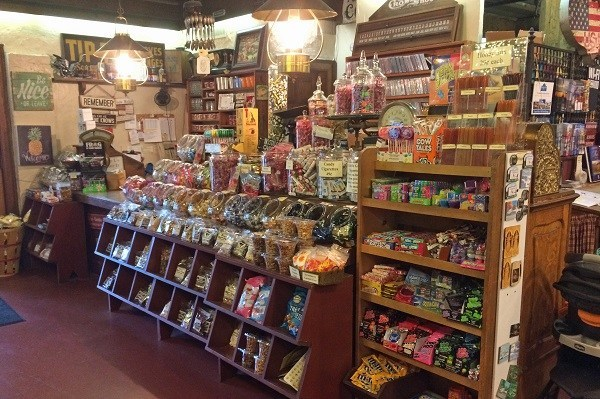
General Store

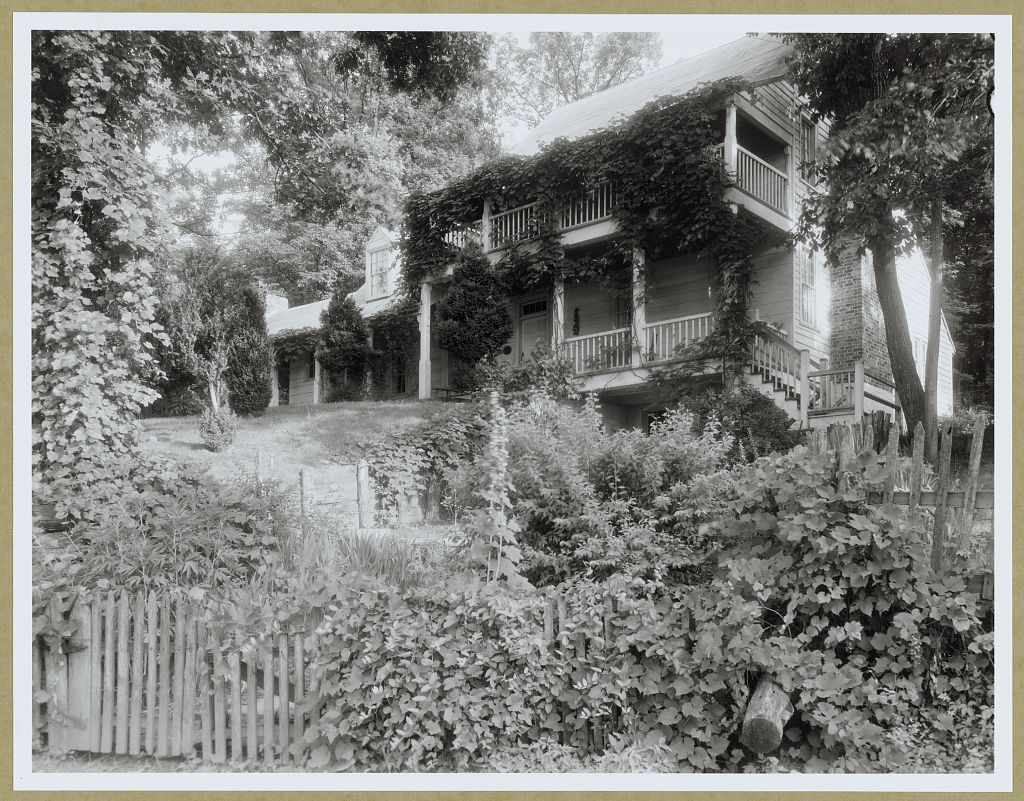
Michie Tavern

== See also ==
- Buck Mountain
- Monticello
- Highland (formerly Ash Lawn-Highland)
- University of Virginia
