= Woolen Mills =

Historic site in Charlottesville, Virginia

Coordinates: 38.02042869778613°N 78.45619256430989°W

Woolen Mills is a historic industrial site in Charlottesville, Virginia on which there was a working mill from the 1790s the 1960s. The mills were built, in part, on property once owned by Thomas Jefferson. Company leadership was unusual in offering assistance to employees of all ages to purchase properties for homes near the mill, leading to a neighborhood containing homes at various income levels. The neighborhood surrounding the mills is now known as the Woolen Mills Village Historic District.

== History ==
Development of the Rivanna River region under Thomas Jefferson's leadership allowed the transport and trade of goods in the early United States. The Charlottesville Woolen Mill was the largest of several brick mills that were built in Albemarle County during the 19th century. Dating to around 1820, the Mills were built along the Rivanna River by William D. Meriwether. The mills processed wool, cotton, flour and timber.

The mill was one of several local companies that produced Uniforms for the Confederate States of America and was burned by U.S. soldiers on March 3, 1865, when the town fell to the Union. The Mills were rebuilt by Henry Clay Marchant three years after the Civil War, but beginning in 1870 the Mills suffered a series of floods and fires until they were destroyed in 1882.

== Twentieth century ==
The Woolen Mills thrived, providing woolen textiles to a variety of businesses, with a particularly strong base in the uniform trade. Military schools, city police departments, and the United States military all ordered uniform cloth from the mill.

== Redevelopment ==
In 2017, the Albemarle County Board of Supervisors approved the rezoning of the Woolen Mills factory property for mixed-use development. The planned complex will house offices and retail establishments.

== Resources ==
The records of the Woolen Mills are held at the Albert and Shirley Small Special Collections Library at the University of Virginia.
