= Earlysville Union Church =

Historic church in Virginia, United States

- U.S. National Register of Historic Places
- Virginia Landmarks Register
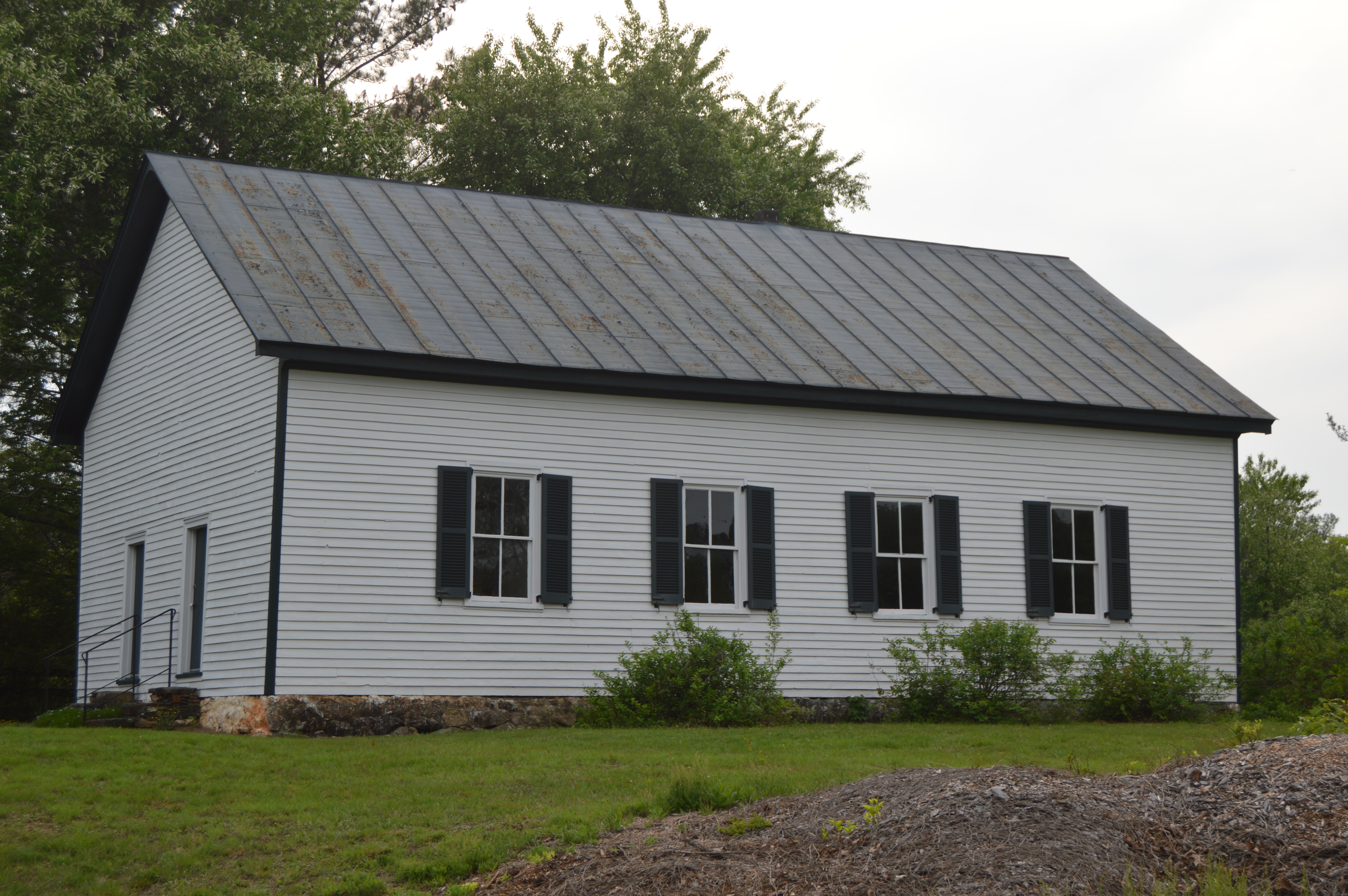
- Roadside view of the former church

- Location within Virginia Location within the United States
- Location: VA 743, NW of jct. with VA 663, Earlysville, Virginia
- Coordinates: 38°9′25″N 78°29′0″W
- Area: 1.5 acres (0.61 ha)
- Built: 1833, 1880
- Architectural style: Early Republic, Early Classical Revival
- NRHP reference No.: 97001504
- VLR No.: 002-0449

Significant dates
- Added to NRHP: December 11, 1997
- Designated VLR: September 17, 1997

Earlysville Union Church, also known as Earlysville Free Union Church, is a historic church located on VA 743, northwest of the junction with VA 633 in Earlysville, Albemarle County, Virginia. It was built in 1833, and is a one-story, frame building with weatherboard siding and a gable roof on a low stone foundation. Entrance to the building is by two doors on the south gable end. It measures approximately 50 feet long by 30 feet wide. The building was originally one room; a small vestibule with flanking rooms for Sunday School rooms was partitioned off around 1880. It is a rare surviving example of interdenominational churches constructed at the beginning of the 19th century in Albemarle County. It was used the Baptists, Methodists and Presbyterians until the turn of the 20th century. The building continued in use as an interdenominational Sunday School for the community until 1977. In 1995, the building underwent restoration.

It was added to the National Register of Historic Places in 1997.
