= StreamWatch =

Coordinates: 38.01418°N 78.4422°W

StreamWatch is an environmental monitoring program focused on the 766-square-mile (1,980 km^{2}) Rivanna River watershed in central Virginia in the United States. The data StreamWatch collects helps communities in the city of Charlottesville and in Albemarle, Fluvanna, and Greene gauge stream conditions and to inform planning and environmental management decisions.

StreamWatch was founded in 2002 as a joint project of The Nature Conservancy, the Rivanna Conservation Society, the Thomas Jefferson Soil and Water Conservation District, the Rivanna River Basin Commission and the Thomas Jefferson Planning District Commission. Conservation groups. Benthic invertebrate (see bioindicator), sedimentation, stream habitat, and other types of data are collected by volunteers and professionals using established scientific protocols. StreamWatch tracks land-use data, including data about agriculture, forestry, and residential and commercial development. Fieldwork, interpretation, and reporting are guided by a technical advisory committee composed of academic and resource agency scientists. StreamWatch also compiles Rivanna watershed data collected by other organizations.
