= Ballard–Maupin House =

Historic house in Virginia, United States

- U.S. National Register of Historic Places
- Virginia Landmarks Register
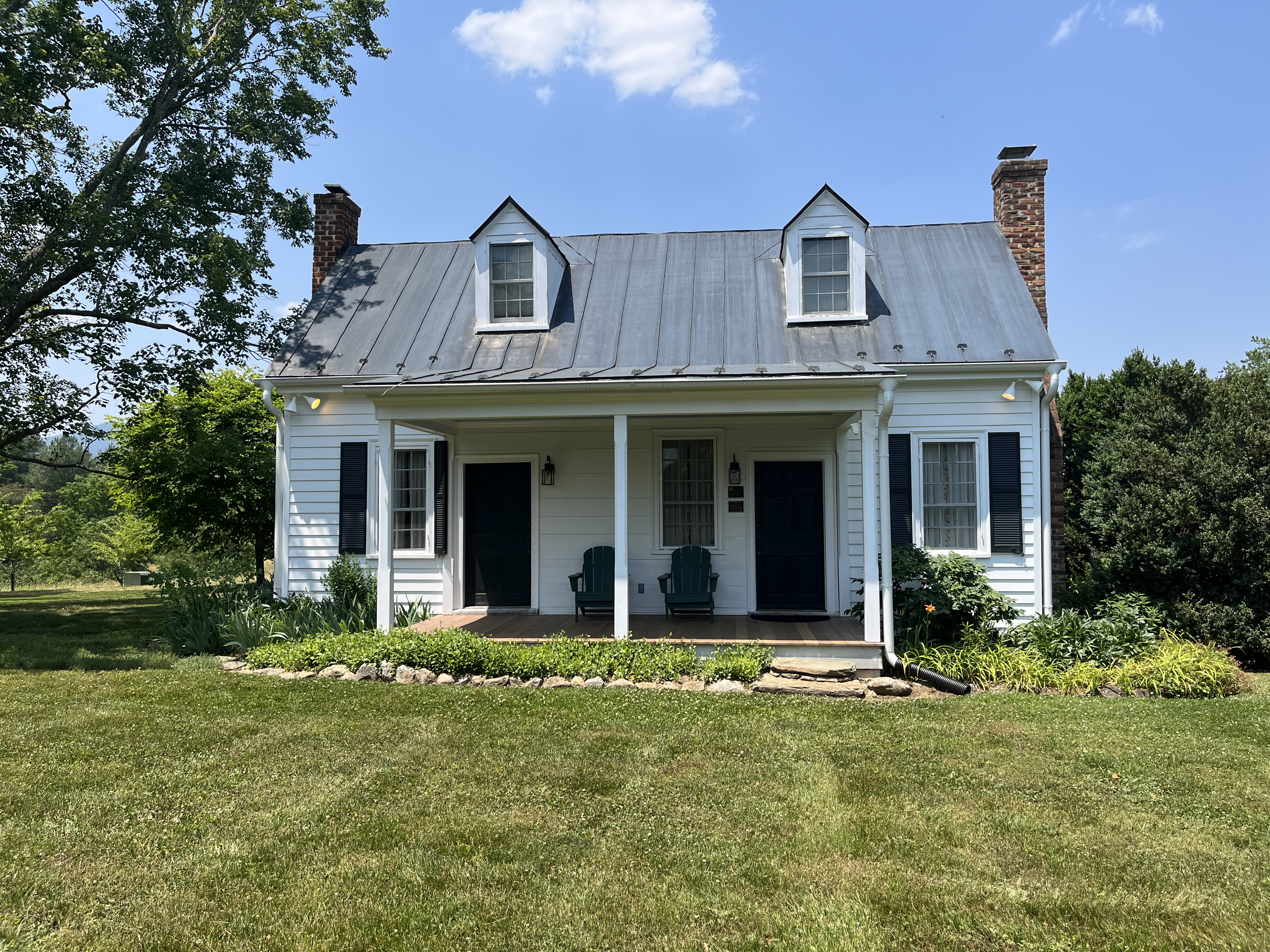

- Location within Virginia Location within the United States
- Location: 4257 Ballard's Mill Rd., Free Union, Virginia
- Coordinates: 38°9′13″N 78°35′53″W
- Area: 4 acres (1.6 ha)
- Built: c. 1750, 1810-1820
- NRHP reference No.: 99000142
- VLR No.: 002-0326

Significant dates
- Added to NRHP: February 5, 1999
- Designated VLR: June 17, 1998

Ballard–Maupin House, also known as Plainview Farm, is a historic home located at Free Union, Albemarle County, Virginia. The original part of the house was built in the 1750-1790 period and is the one-story with attic, three-bay, gable-roofed, frame section on the east. Around 1800–1820, the house was extended on the west by an additional two bays and an attic story was added. It measures approximately 34 feet wide and 30 feet deep. In 1994–1995, the house was restored and a late-19th century addition was removed and replaced with a one-story, shed-roofed, frame addition. Also on the property are a mid-19th century, gable-roofed, frame shed; and frame tractor shed that may date to the mid-1940s.

It was added to the National Register of Historic Places in 1999.
