= Estes Farm =

Historic house in Virginia, United States

- U.S. National Register of Historic Places
- Virginia Landmarks Register
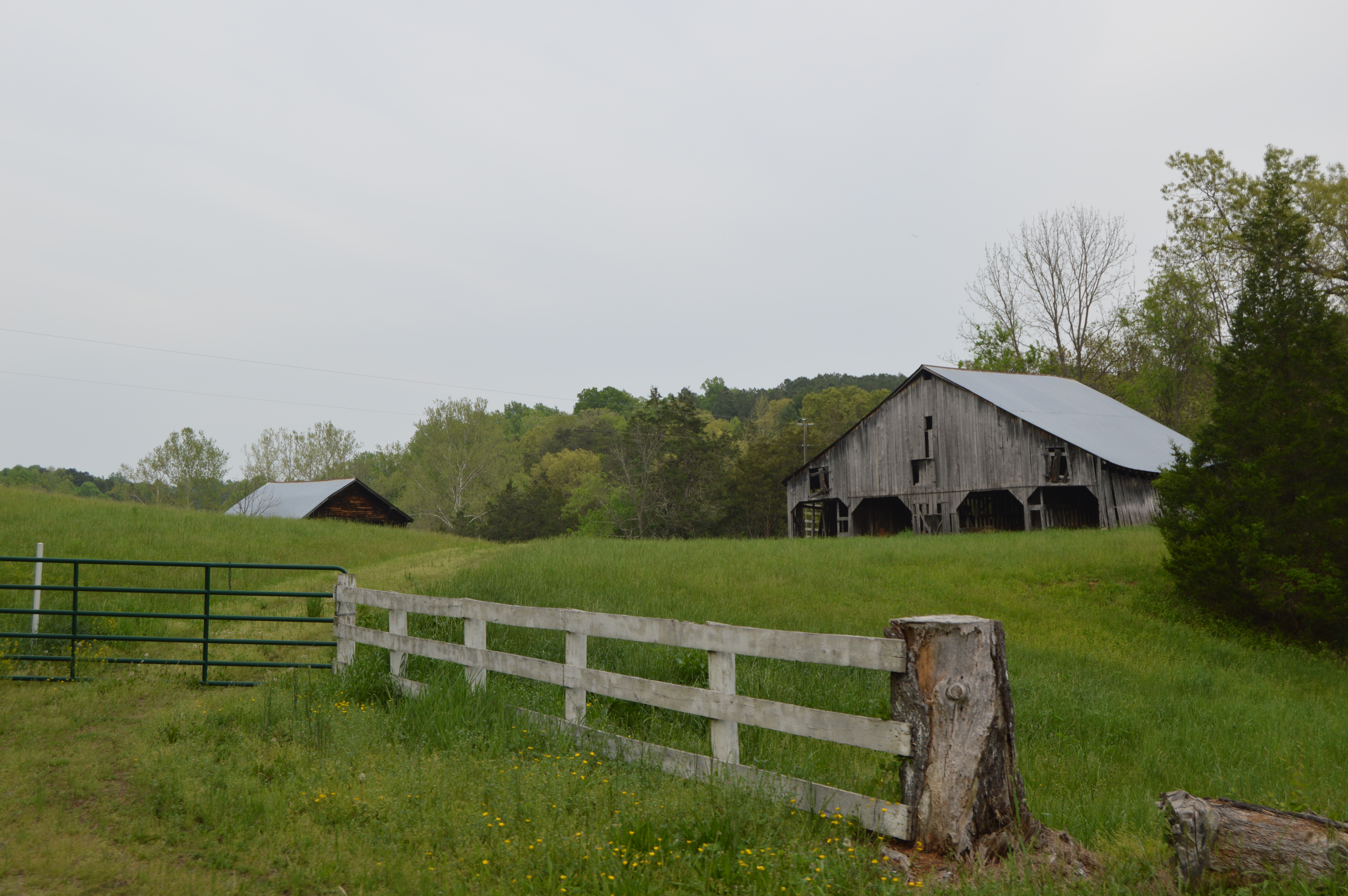
- Barns along Simmons Gap Road

- Location within Virginia Location within the United States
- Location: 6185 Estes Ln., near Dyke, Virginia
- Coordinates: 38°12′21″N 78°29′41″W
- Area: 265 acres (107 ha)
- Built: c. 1840, c. 1840
- Architectural style: Greek Revival, Italianate
- NRHP reference No.: 06000409
- VLR No.: 002-0524

Significant dates
- Added to NRHP: May 17, 2006
- Designated VLR: March 8, 2006

Estes Farm is a historic home and farm complex located near Dyke, Albemarle County, Virginia. It includes a c. 1840 log dwelling and a c. 1880 wood framed main house, as well as numerous supporting outbuildings including a large barn (c. 1840), an icehouse/well house (c. 1880), a tenant house (c. 1880), the log dwelling (c. 1840), a small hay/tobacco barn (c. 1920), a garage (c. 1900), and three small sheds. Also on the property is a contributing truss bridge (c. 1915). The house is a two-story, three-bay frame I-house building with a hipped roof. A two-story half-hipped central rear ell was added in 1976. It is representative of a transitional Greek Revival / Italianate style. It features a one-story three-bay porch fronting the central entrance, and exterior-end brick chimneys.

It was added to the National Register of Historic Places in 2006.
