= Union Mills Canal Outlet Locks No. 1 and No. 2 =

- Union Mills Canal Outlet Locks #1 and #2
- U.S. National Register of Historic Places
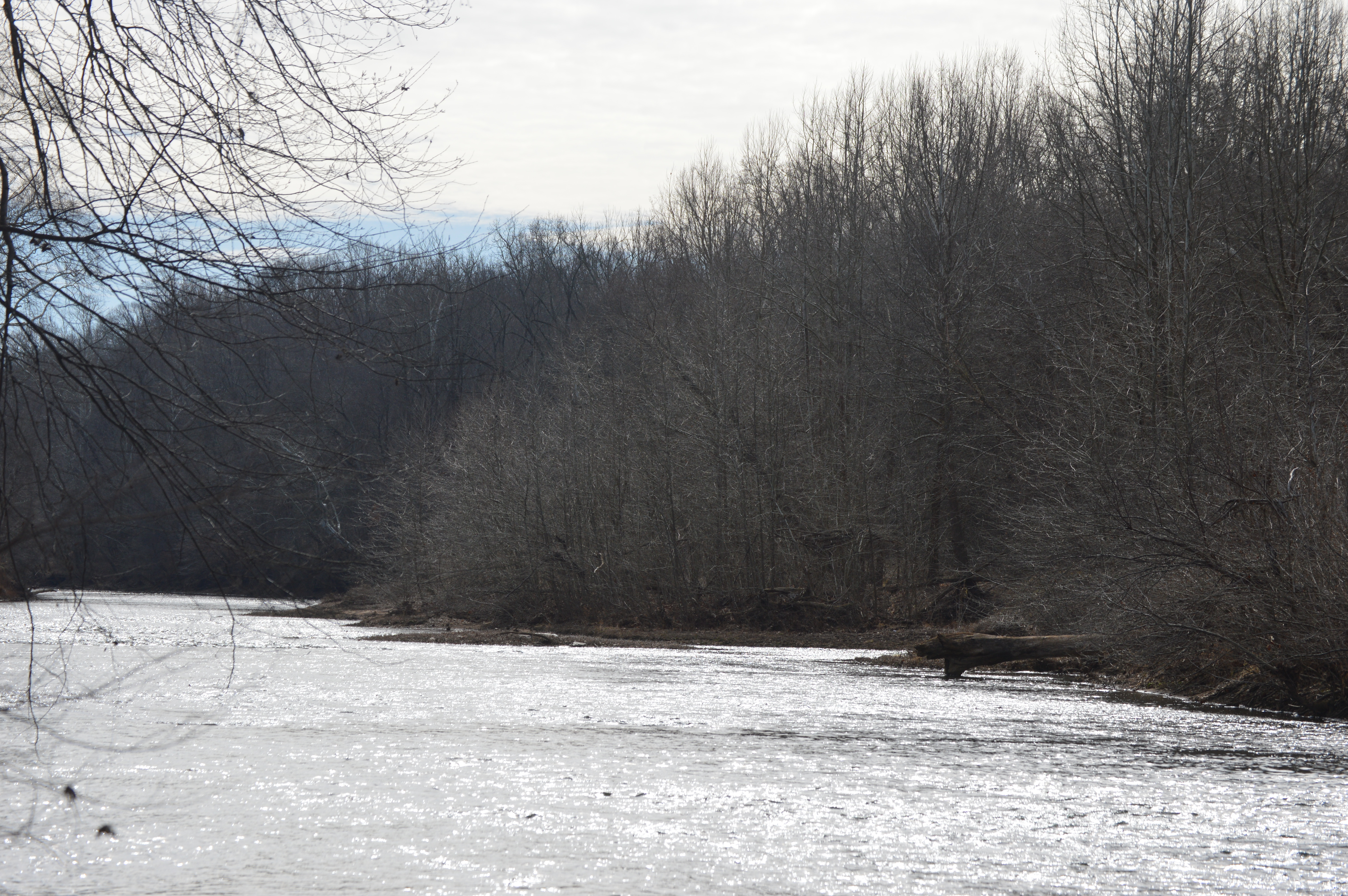
- Looking downstream toward the locks
- Nearest city: Crofton, Virginia
- Area: 1 acre (0.40 ha)
- Built: 1850
- NRHP reference No.: 99001256
- Added to NRHP: October 14, 1999

The Union Mills Canal Outlet Locks No. 1 and No. 2 are a pair of locks along the route of a canal system that improved navigation on the Rivanna River in Fluvanna County, Virginia. Located near Crofton, they are two large locks fashioned out of dressed granite blocks. They were built between 1850 and 1854.

Until the 1850s, canal and river transportation primarily employed batteaux, but mid-century saw the construction of towpaths to enable mules to pull boats. It was for this purpose that the Union Mills Canal and its outlet locks were constructed. The canal is approximately 2.5 miles (4.0 km) long, with a lock and dam complex at the upper end; it runs on the right bank of the river.

The outlet locks, situated at the lower end of the canal, are located just above the mouth of a small stream, Boston Creek, which nearby is dammed to form Lake Monticello. The lake is a resort community; although a footpath was built to the locks in 1984, it remains private property with limited access. One of the locks is in substantially better condition than the other: one is nearly invisible, thanks to silt buildup, while the other is well maintained and remains easily visible to the visitor who obtains permission to enter the property.

The locks were listed on the National Register of Historic Places in 1999.
