= Fred M. Hatch =

American football coach, athletics administrator, educator (1877–1932)

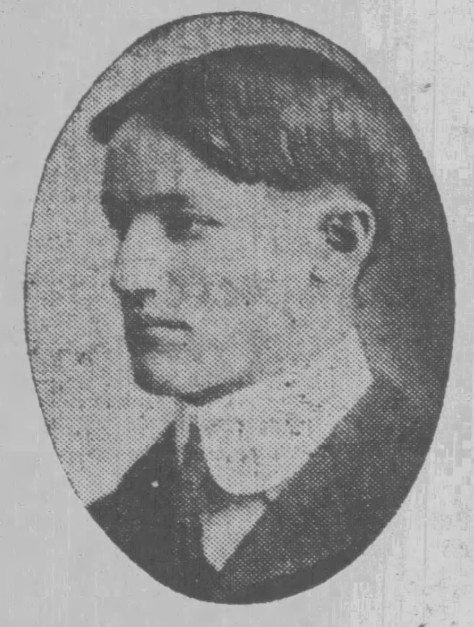
- Hatch pictured in The Minneapolis Journal, 1904

Biographical details
- Born: October 28, 1877; Bureau County, Illinois, U.S.
- Died: December 24, 1932 (aged 55); Oberlin, Ohio, U.S.

Playing career

Football
- 1898–1901: Oberlin

Track and field
- 1902: Oberlin

Coaching career (HC unless noted)

Football
- 1902: Alma
- 1903: Waynesburg
- 1907–1908: West HS (OH)
- 1909: Oberlin HS (OH)

Administrative career (AD unless noted)
- 1904: Valley City State
- 1907–1909: West HS (OH)

Head coaching record
- Overall: 8–4–1 (college)

Accomplishments and honors

Championships
- 1 MIAA (1902)

Frederick Milton Hatch (October 28, 1877 – December 24, 1932) was an American football coach, athletics administrator, and educator. He served as the head football at Alma College in 1902 and Waynesburg College—now known as Waynesburg University—in 1903.

== Early life and education ==
Born October 28, 1877 in Bureau County, Illinois, Hatch grew up near Creston, Iowa. He attended the Oberlin Academy from 1896 to 1898. He enrolled at Oberlin College in 1898 and graduated in 1902. He was the captain of the football team in 1900 and of the track team in 1902. Hatch lettered for the football team four times, from 1898 to 1901, playing at end and halfback.

== Coaching career ==
Hatch was the head football coach at Alma College in Alma, Michigan for one season, in 1902. His 1902 Alma team went 5–1 and was declared conference champions for the Michigan Intercollegiate Athletic Association. In 1903, Hatch was hired at the athletic coach at Waynesburg College—now known as Waynesburg University—in Waynesburg, Pennsylvania. In 1904, he was appointed as the athletic director at Valley City State Normal School—now known as Valley City State University—in Valley City, North Dakota.

In 1907, Hatch became the football coach at West High School in Cleveland. He was also the school's athletic director for two years until returning to Oberlin, Ohio as Oberlin High School's football coach in 1909. He gave up teaching in 1910, and became a railway postal clerk based in Oberlin, Ohio. He continued to coach in various local organizations for some years.

== Family and death ==
Hatch married his Oberlin College classmate, Ellen Hayden Birdseye, on September 28, 1905. Exactly one year after their marriage, their only son, George Birdseye, was born. Hatch died on December 24, 1932, in Oberlin, Ohio. His wife, Ellen, died in 1947.

== Head coaching record ==
=== College ===
Year	Team	Overall	Conference	Standing	Bowl/playoffs
Alma Maroon and Cream (Michigan Intercollegiate Athletic Association) (1902)
1902	Alma	5–1	4–1	T–1st	
Alma:		5–1	4–1		
Waynesburg Yellow Jackets (Independent) (1903)
1903	Waynesburg	3–3–1			
Waynesburg:		3–3–1			
Total:		8–4–1			
National championship Conference title Conference division title or championship game berth
