= Buck Mountain (Long Lake, New York) =

Mountain in New York, United States

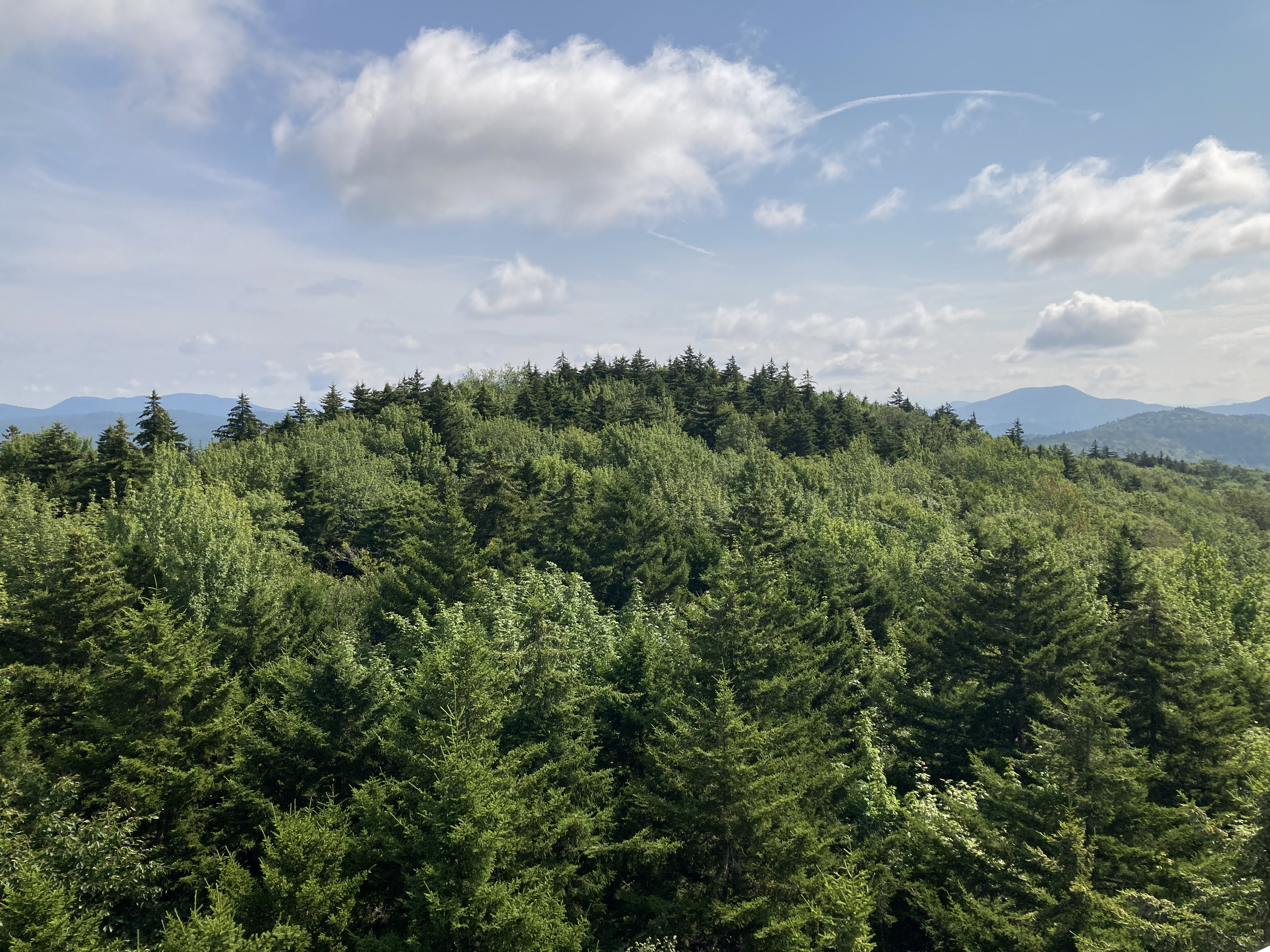
- The summit of Buck Mountain pictured from the cab of the fire tower.

Highest point
- Elevation: 2,392 feet (729 m)
- Coordinates: 44°03′10″N 74°31′58″W

Geography
- Location within New York Adirondack Park Location within the United States
- Location: Hamilton County, New York, U.S.
- Topo map: USGS Little Tupper Lake

Buck Mountain is a mountain in the Adirondack Mountains region of New York. It is located in Long Lake, New York, southwest of Tupper Lake in Hamilton County. The Buck Mountain Fire Observation Station is located on top of the mountain. In 2023, a newly constructed 1.2-mile trail opened that provided public access to the long-restricted fire tower.

== History ==
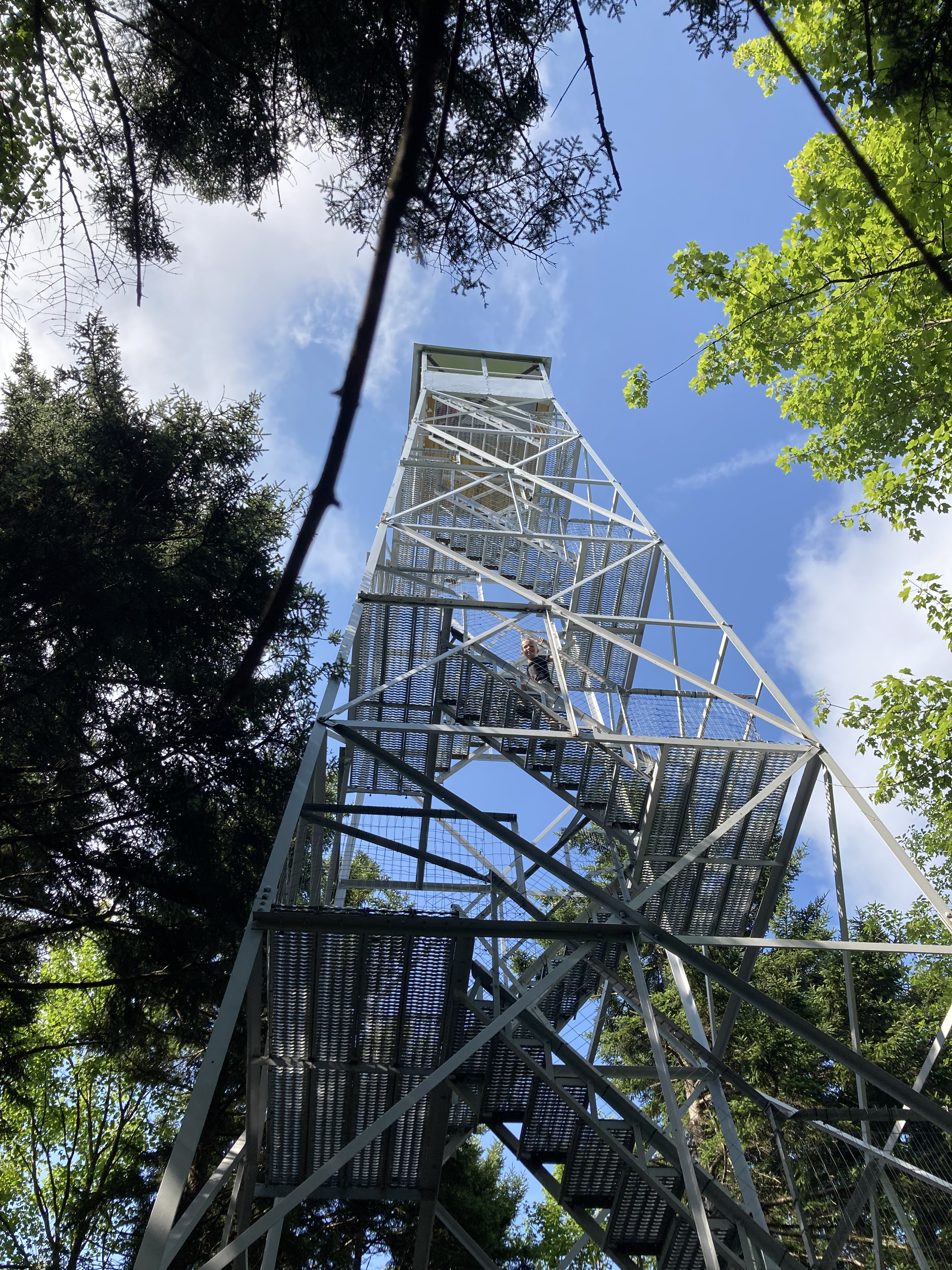
The Buck Mountain fire tower pictured in August 2024.

Located in Long Lake, New York, the Buck Mountain Fire Observation Station is a 60-foot-tall (18 m) Aermotor LS-40 tower that was erected in the privately owned Whitney Park circa 1933. In 2006, the International Paper Company signed an agreement to sell all its land in the Adirondack Park to Lyme Timber Company for $137 million. On June 21, 2021 the Hamilton County Board of Supervisors announced that the tower would soon be reopened to the public. Cedar Heights Timber agreed with the county to enter into a 10-year agreement to open the fire tower to the public. The trail was completed and public access opened in September 2023.
