= Frederick W. Hatch (psychiatrist) =

American psychiatrist (1849–1924)

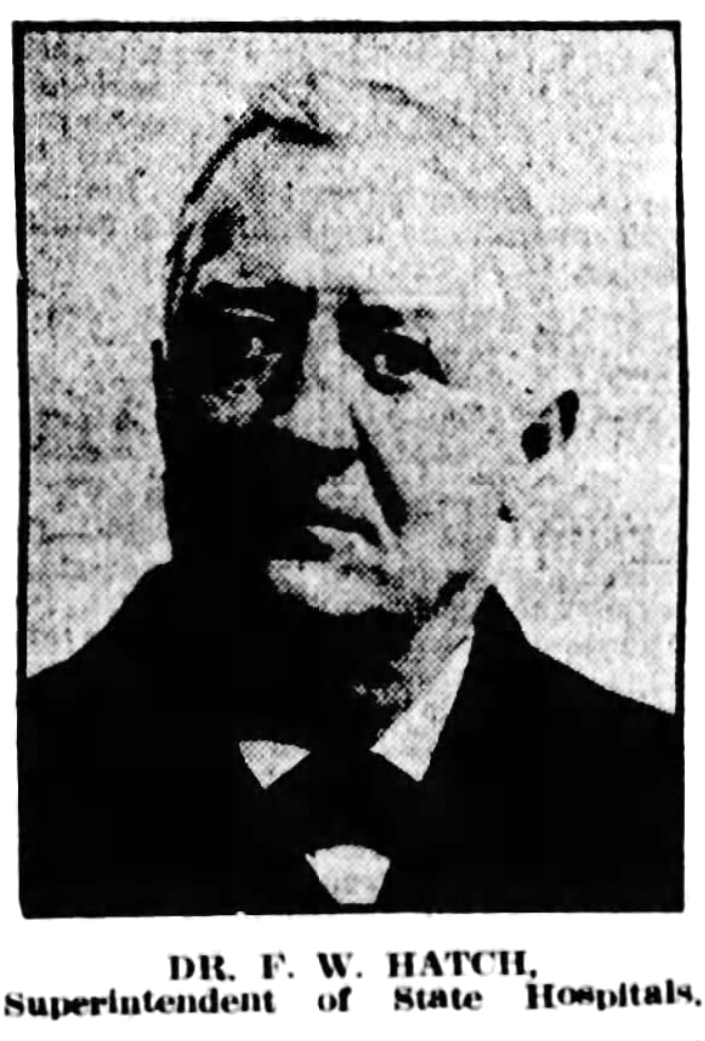
- Born: Frederick Winslow Hatch III; December 4, 1849; Kenosha, Wisconsin, U.S.
- Died: February 24, 1924 February 24, 1924 (aged 74); Sacramento, California, U.S.
- Burial place: East Lawn Memorial Park, Sacramento, California, U.S.
- Other names: Frederick Winston Hatch, F. W. Hatch
- Education: Thomas Jefferson University
- Occupations: Psychiatrist, eugenicist, forensic psychiatrist, California state-appointed official
- Political party: Republican
- Spouse: Florence Folansbee (m.1882 –1924; his death)
- Children: 1
- Father: Frederick W. Hatch Jr.
- Relatives: Frederick Winslow Hatch Sr. (paternal grandfather)

Frederick Winslow Hatch III, also known as F. W. Hatch (December 4, 1849 – February 24, 1924) was an American psychiatrist, eugenicist, and California state-appointed official. He served as the General Superintendent of State Hospitals in California for some 20 years, where he implemented sterilization on patients and historically influenced early mental health treatment in the state. Hatch served as a forensic psychiatrist for the criminally insane, and he was associated with some of the most important criminal trials on the West Coast in the early 20th-century.

== Early life, family and education ==
Frederick Winslow Hatch III was born on December 4, 1849, in Kenosha, Wisconsin. He was the son of Sarah Rowland (née Bloom; 1827–1906) and Frederick Winslow Hatch Jr. (1821–1884). His family was from English heritage, and his father was an early physician in California. His father moved to California for work when his son was age three, and he was raised in Sacramento, California.

Hatch attended Jefferson Medical College at Thomas Jefferson University in Philadelphia, and graduated in 1873.

In 1882, Hatch and Florence Folansbee were married, and together they had one daughter.

== Career ==
After graduation, Hatch practiced medicine for a few years after returning to California. Hatch served as the second assistant physician at Napa State Insane Asylum from 1879 until 1889. He was elected as the Superintendent of Agnews Insane Asylum, from the fall of 1889 until 1897. Hatch was a member of the California State Lunacy Commission.

In April 1897, Hatch was appointed to the General Superintendent of all state hospitals under the California State Lunacy Commission by Governor James Budd. Hatch was concerned about the need for a new asylum in the state for the criminally insane; and he instituted grey uniforms for patients in 1899. He served a second term as the General Superintendent of all state hospitals under Governor Henry T. Gage.

In 1902, Governor Gage ordered an investigation by Hatch of Dr. William M. Lawlor, the Superintendent of the California Home for the Care and Training of Feeble Minded Children (now the Sonoma Developmental Center) in Sonoma County, California. Lawlor was charged with the cruel treatment of patients under his care, including children.

After the 1906 San Francisco earthquake and fires, the Agnews Insane Asylum was greatly damaged and people died and Hatch was criticized in the press for his delayed response.

Hatch was instrumental in the passage of the 1909 Asexualization Act, a sterilization law introduced by a friend of Hatch, senator W. F. Price. After the Asexualization Act passed, Hatch implemented successive related laws. He held the position of General Superintendent until 1921, and used it to implement policy and hire hospital administrators in favor of eugenics. While he held this position, it is estimated some 3,000 people were sterilized in the state.

== Death ==
He died at age 74 on February 24, 1924, at his home in Sacramento, California. After his death, his legacy of an active program for sterilization continued through the next Superintendents.

== See also ==
- Compulsory sterilization
- Eugenics in California
