= White Hall, Albemarle County, Virginia =

Unincorporated community in Virginia, United States

White Hall
- Unincorporated community
- Location within the Commonwealth of Virginia White Hall (the United States)
- Coordinates: 38°07′04″N 78°39′41″W
- Country: United States
- State: Virginia
- County: Albemarle
- Time zone: UTC−5 (Eastern (EST))
  - Summer (DST): UTC−4 (EDT)
- GNIS feature ID: 1477940

White Hall is an unincorporated community in Albemarle County, Virginia, United States.

"Whitehall, in the northwestern portion of the county, was an election precinct known as Glenn's Store, William Maupin's Store, Maupin's Tavern, Miller's Store, Shumate's Tavern, until 1835. Then, it was named Whitehall for a White family living in the community. White Hall Pop. 55; elev. 722."

Whitehall was an election district, and was also previously named Glenn's Store; William Maupin's Store; Maupin's Tavern; Miller's Tavern; Shumate's Tavern, until the present name was established in 1835. The White family in the area was possibly that of Anderson White, whose plantation was four miles to the east, in Free Union, and who, with his wife Lucinda Huckstep, raised 12 children, some of whom lived at White Hall.

The Virginia house of Delegates passed Bill 111 on December 19, 1849, for a survey of a road from Shumate's Tavern to Covington, Virginia in Alleghany County, Virginia. In January 1849 a grant in aid was proposed to intersect the turnpike from Vance's on the Huntersville and Warm Springs Turnpike to the Jackson's River Turnpike at John Shumate's Tavern, a distance of about 15 miles.
