= Frederick W. Hatch (physician) =

American physician (1821–1884)

Frederick Winslow Hatch Jr.
- Born: March 2, 1821; Charlottesville, Virginia, U.S.
- Died: October 16, 1884 (aged 63); Sacramento, California, U.S.
- Resting place: Sacramento City Cemetery, Sacramento, California, U.S.
- Other names: Frederick Winslow Hatch II, F. W. Hatch
- Education: Marion College, New York University (BA, MA)
- Spouse: Sarah Rowland Bloom
- Children: 4, Frederick W. Hatch III
- Father: Frederick Winslow Hatch

Frederick Winslow Hatch Jr. (March 2, 1821–October 16, 1884) was an American medical doctor and educator in Sacramento, California. He was a pioneering physician in the state of California, and served as the Secretary of the California Board of Health.

His father was Episcopal clergyman and the chaplain of U.S. Senate Rev. Frederick Winslow Hatch (1789–1860), and his son was a noted psychiatrist and the General Superintendent of State Hospitals in California, Frederick W. Hatch III (1849–1924).

== Life and career ==
Frederick Winslow Hatch Jr. was born on March 2, 1821, in Charlottesville, Virginia. He was raised in Washington, D.C., where his father Rev. Frederick Winslow Hatch (1789–1860) was serving as the Chaplain of the United States Senate.

Hatch attended Marion College, and graduated in 1840, at age 19; followed by a bachelor's and master's degree in 1844 from the Medical College of New York University (now the Grossman School of Medicine).

Hatch arrived in California around 1853, during the gold rush era and the formation of the state, and he settled in Sacramento, California. He was a pioneering physician in the state. He was the president in 1869 of the Sacramento Society for Medical Improvement.

Hatch taught courses on the theory and practice of medicine in the medical department of the University of California (now University of California, San Francisco). In his late life Hatch also taught courses on hygiene. From March 3, 1876 until his death in 1884, Hatch was the Secretary of the California Board of Health (precursor to the California Department of Public Health).

Hatch served as the vice president in 1877 of the Sacramento Library (now Sacramento Public Library), when it was a public subscription library.

In the spring in 1884, Hatch travelled to the East Coast to serve as a delegate for the American Medical Association. While traveling he contracted a cold or infection. He died on October 16, 1884, after succumbing to his illness in his home in Sacramento.
