= Millington, Virginia =

Unincorporated community in Virginia, United States

Millington
- Unincorporated community
- Location within the Commonwealth of Virginia Millington (the United States)
- Coordinates: 38°07′24″N 78°36′44″W
- Country: United States
- State: Virginia
- County: Albemarle
- Time zone: UTC−5 (Eastern (EST))
  - Summer (DST): UTC−4 (EDT)
- GNIS feature ID: 1493294

Millington is an unincorporated community in Albemarle County, Virginia, United States.

Midway was added to the National Register of Historic Places in 1979.
