= Buck Peak (Diablo Range) =

Mountain in California, United States

Coordinates: 36°32′42″N 120°52′23″W

Buck Peak is a summit in the Diablo Range in San Benito County, California. It rises to an elevation of 3,527 feet (1,075 meters).
