= Buck Mountain (Iron County, Missouri) =

Mountain in Iron County, Missouri

Coordinates: 37°36′17″N 90°43′08″W

Buck Mountain is a summit in Iron County in the U.S. state of Missouri. The summit has an elevation of 1,624 feet (495 m).

Buck Mountain most likely was named after the bucks in the area.
