= Frederick W. Hatch (clergy) =

American Episcopal clergyman, chaplain of U.S. Senate (1789–1862)

Frederick Winslow Hatch Sr.
- Born: August 1, 1789; Blandford, Massachusetts, U.S.
- Died: January 14, 1860 (aged 70); Sacramento, California, U.S.
- Resting place: Sacramento City Cemetery, Sacramento, California, U.S.
- Occupation(s): Episcopal clergyman, elected official
- Spouse(s): Frances Lowry Robertson; Mary Ann Weatherburn
- Children: 4, including Frederick W. Hatch Jr.
- Relatives: Frederick W. Hatch III

Rev. Frederick Winslow Hatch Sr. (August 1, 1789 – January 14, 1860) was an American Episcopal clergyman, who served as the 29th Chaplain of the United States Senate in 1833 to 1835.

== Early years ==
Frederick Winslow Hatch was born August 1, 1789, in Blandford, Massachusetts, the son of Lucretia Rockwell and Timothy Hatch.

Hatch was ordained a deacon by Bishop Thomas John Claggett in 1810.

== Ministry ==
He served in St. Paul's Episcopal Church in Edenton, North Carolina, (1811–1815) until he moved to All Saints' Church, Fredericktown, Maryland.

Hatch then served in Charlottesville, Virginia from 1820–1830, and while there, the original Christ Church was erected (1824-'25), this was the first denominational building in the village. The plan for the church was furnished, though not designed, by Thomas Jefferson, but it was demolished in 1895. He also preached at Buck Mountain Episcopal Church and Walker's during this time. The Hatch's home was about two miles down the road from Thomas Jefferson's Monticello. Family members recalled waving to General Lafayette, James Madison and other revolutionary figures on their way to see the former President.

In 1830 Hatch became the rector of Washington Parish, District of Columbia. While there, he served as Chaplain of the Senate from 1833 until 1835.

In 1836 he moved to St. Paul's Church, Poughkeepsie, New York.

He was the first rector of St Matthew's Church in Kenosha, Wisconsin, (then called Southport) where he went with his family in 1843 and stayed till moving to California in 1856, to live near his son.

He died in Sacramento, California, on January 14, 1860. He is interred in the Sacramento Historic City Cemetery.

== Personal life and family ==
He married first, Frances Lowry Robertson in Baltimore in 1812; she died while they were in Edenton, North Carolina. He married secondly, Mary Ann Weatherburn. They had four children, two sons and two daughters.

His son, Frederick Winslow Hatch Jr. (1821–1884) was a pioneering physician in Sacramento, California, and served as the Secretary of the California Board of Health. His grandson was Frederick W. Hatch III (1849–1924), a noted psychiatrist, eugenicist, and the General Superintendent of State Hospitals in California for some 20 years.

Religious titles
Preceded by Charles Constantine Pise	29th US Senate Chaplain; December 10, 1833 – December 23, 1835	Succeeded by Edward Young Higbee
