= Pise, Bhiwandi =

Village in Maharashtra

Pise
- village
- Location in Maharashtra, India Pise (India)
- Coordinates: 19.3236557°N 73.1792125°E
- Country: India
- State: Maharashtra
- District: Thane
- Taluka: Bhiwandi
- Elevation: 33 m (108 ft)

Population (2011)
  - Total: 1,120
- Time zone: UTC+5:30 (IST)
- 2011 census code: 552631

Pise is a village in the Thane district of Maharashtra, India. It is located in the Bhiwandi taluka.

== Demographics ==
According to the 2011 census of India, Pise has 236 households. The effective literacy rate (i.e. the literacy rate of population excluding children aged 6 and below) is 79.75%.

Demographics (2011 Census)
	Total	Male	Female
Population	1120	583	537
Children aged below 6 years	167	80	87
Scheduled caste	66	35	31
Scheduled tribe	124	64	60
Literates	760	445	315
Workers (all)	620	328	292
Main workers (total)	582	304	278
Main workers: Cultivators	69	54	15
Main workers: Agricultural labourers	66	48	18
Main workers: Household industry workers	25	13	12
Main workers: Other	422	189	233
Marginal workers (total)	38	24	14
Marginal workers: Cultivators	7	3	4
Marginal workers: Agricultural labourers	19	15	4
Marginal workers: Household industry workers	1	0	1
Marginal workers: Others	11	6	5
Non-workers	500	255	245
