= Midway (Millington, Virginia) =

Historic house in Virginia, United States

- U.S. National Register of Historic Places
- Virginia Landmarks Register
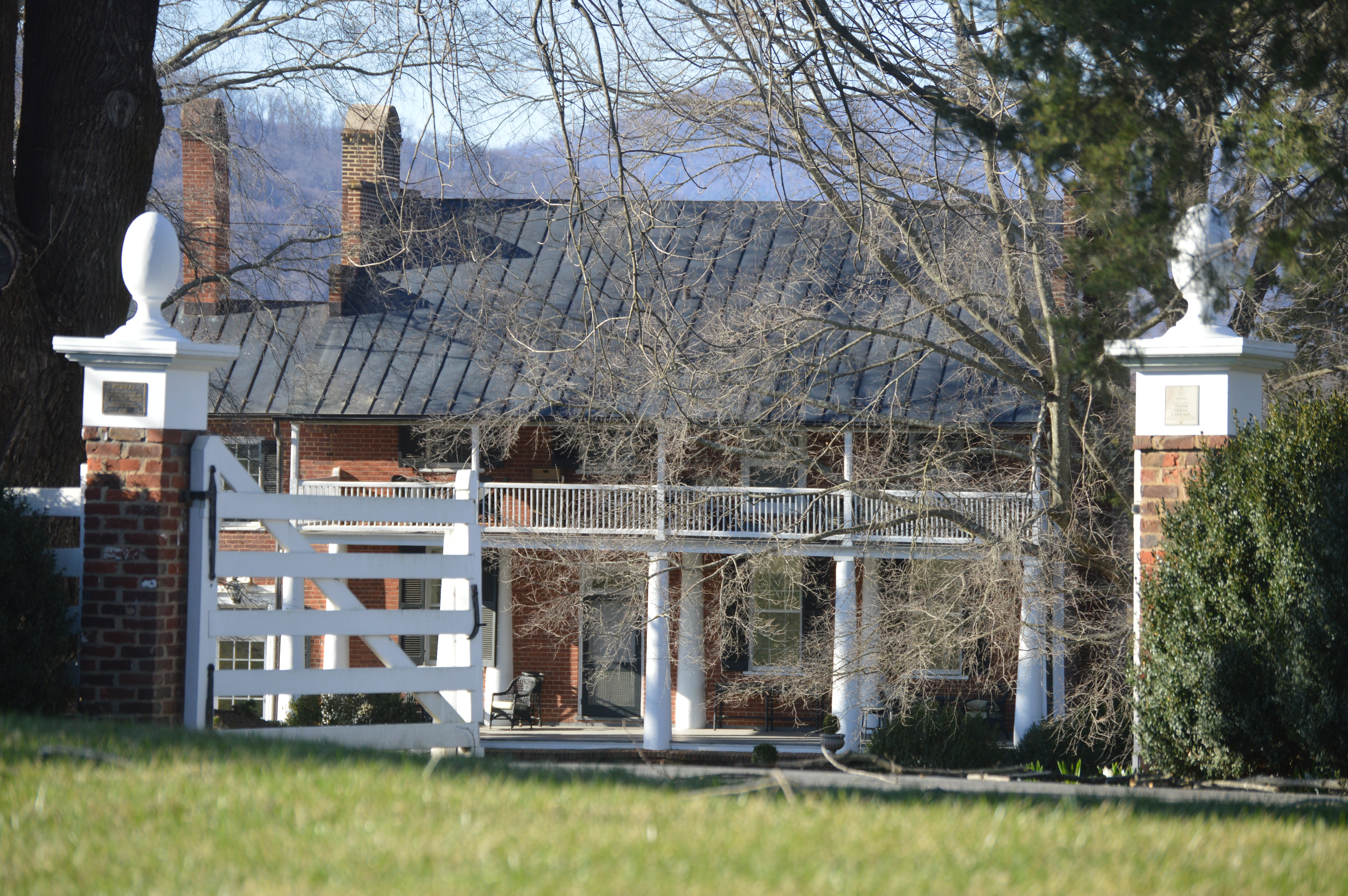
- Entrance to the property

- Location within Virginia Location within the United States
- Location: Southeast of Millington off VA 678, near Millington, Virginia
- Coordinates: 38°6′39″N 78°36′2″W
- Area: 75 acres (30 ha)
- Built: c. 1815
- Architect: Charles Gillette
- Architectural style: Federal
- NRHP reference No.: 79003152
- VLR No.: 002-0143

Significant dates
- Added to NRHP: February 28, 1979
- Designated VLR: September 19, 1978

Midway, also known as Riverdale Farm, is a historic home and farm complex located near Millington, Albemarle County, Virginia. The main dwelling is a two-story, four-bay brick structure with a two-story porch. It was built in three sections, with the east wing built during the 1820s and a second structure to the west about 1815; they were connected in the late 19th century. The east wing features Federal woodwork. A rear (north) kitchen wing was added about 1930. It is connected to the main house by a two-story hyphen. Also on the property are a contributing brick kitchen and wood-frame barn. The grounds of Midway were landscaped in 1936 by noted landscape architect Charles Gillette.

It was added to the National Register of Historic Places in 1979.
