= Lynch River =

Coordinates: 38.22235°N 78.48057°W

Location
- Country: United States

Physical characteristics
- Source
  - location: Virginia
- Length: 9.8 mi (15.8 km)

The Lynch River is a 9.8-mile-long (15.8 km) tributary of the North Fork Rivanna River in the U.S. state of Virginia. It is part of the James River watershed. It rises at the unincorporated community of Mission Home near the boundary of Shenandoah National Park and flows southeast past Shady Grove and Nortonsville to join the Roach River, forming the North Fork of the Rivanna at their confluence. The Lynch River flows through Greene and Albemarle counties, crossing their boundary several times.

== See also ==
- List of rivers of Virginia
