= Earlysville, Virginia =

Unincorporated community in Virginia, United States

Earlysville
- Census-designated place
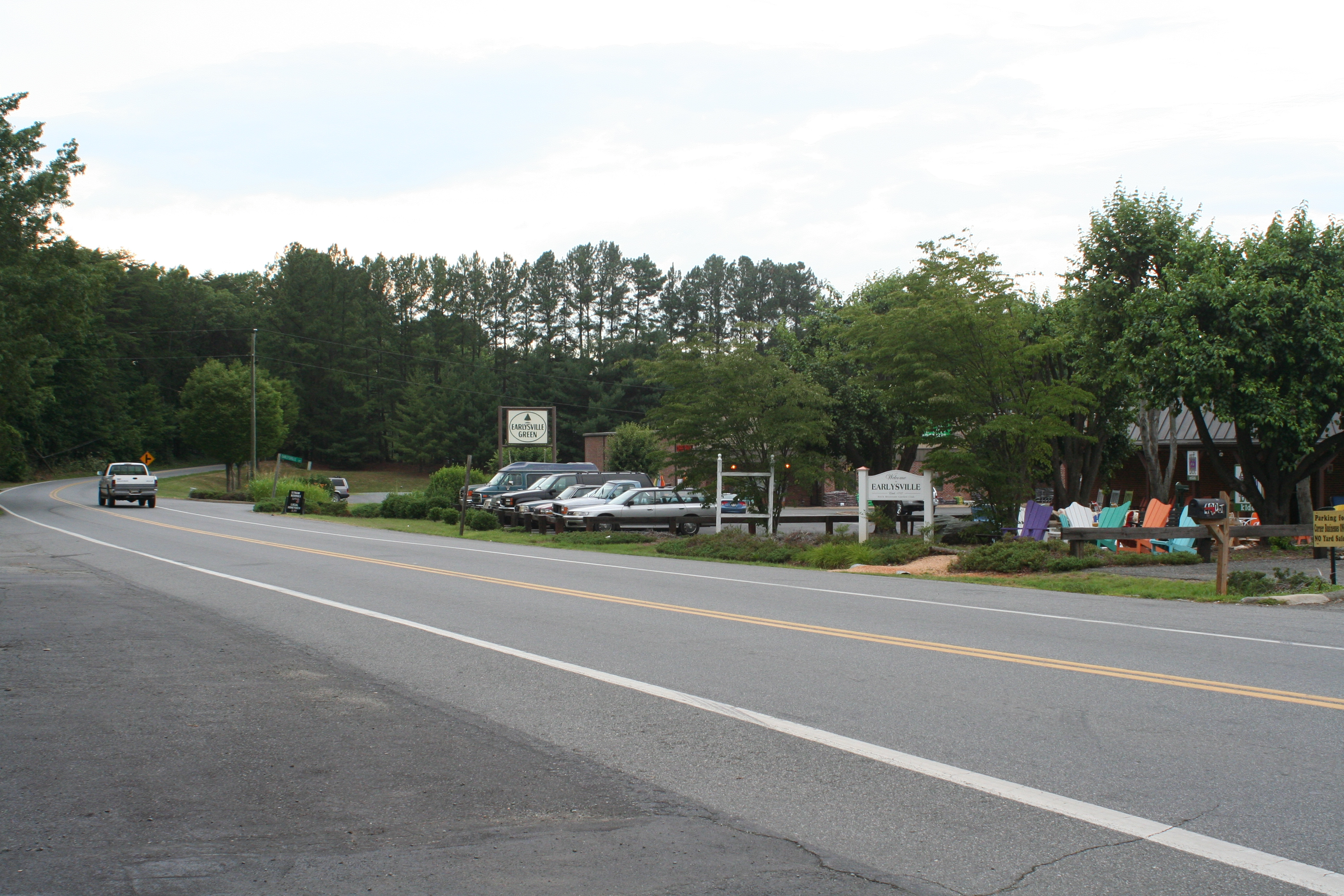

- Location of the Earlysville CDP within the Albemarle county

- Location within the state of Virginia Earlysville (the United States)
- Coordinates: 38°09′27″N 78°28′58″W
- Country: United States
- State: Virginia
- County: Albemarle
- Named for: John Early

Area
  - Total: 3.07 sq mi (7.95 km^{2})
  - Land: 3.07 sq mi (7.94 km^{2})
  - Water: 0.0039 sq mi (0.01 km^{2})
- Elevation: 646 ft (197 m)

Population (2020)
  - Total: 1,153
  - Density: 376/sq mi (145/km^{2})
- Time zone: UTC−5 (Eastern (EST))
  - Summer (DST): UTC−4 (EDT)
- ZIP codes: 22936
- Area code: 434
- GNIS feature ID: 1494213
- Website: Official website

Earlysville is an unincorporated community and census-designated place in Albemarle County, Virginia, United States, roughly 9 miles (14 km) north of Charlottesville. It was first listed as a CDP in the 2020 census with a population of 1,153.

== History ==
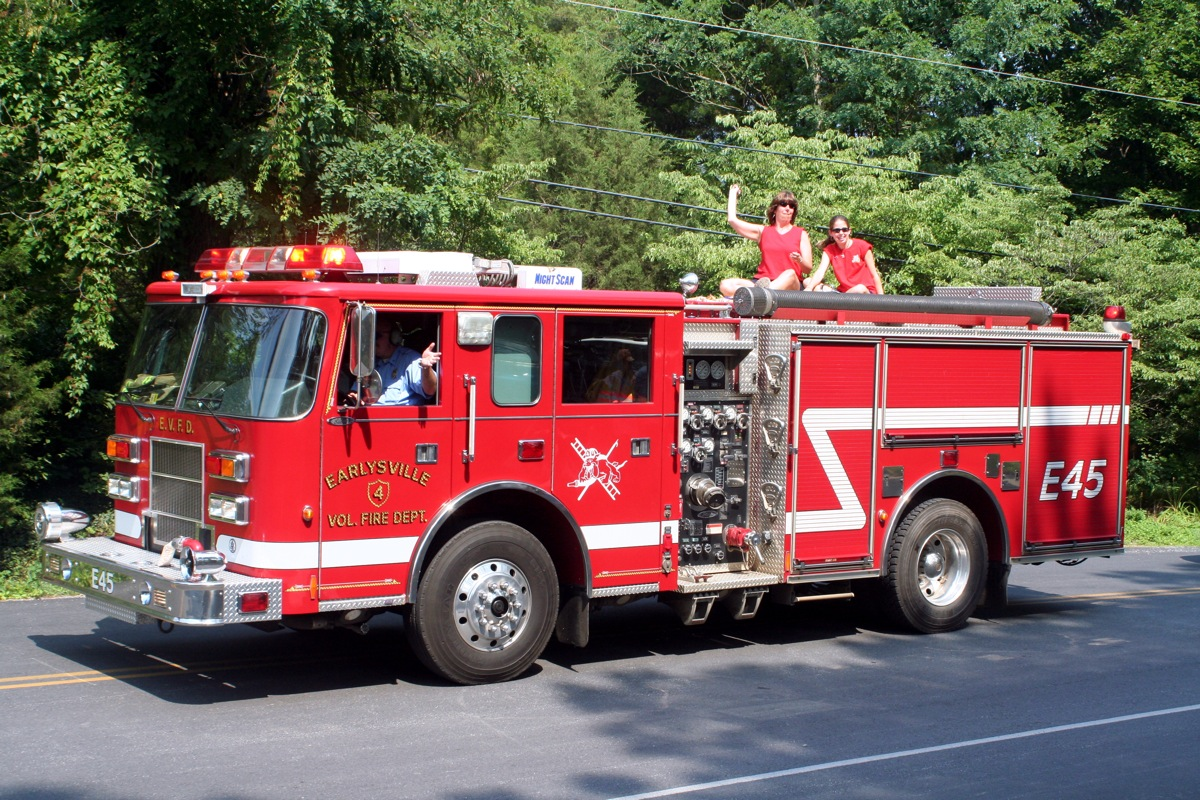
Earlysville Fire Department Engine 45 at the Independence Day Parade

It is named for John Early (1773–1833), a relative of Confederate general Jubal Early. In 1822, John Early bought just under 1,000 acres (4 km^{2}) of land from his father-in-law that now comprise a portion of the town. Earlysville has a small central business district (pictured at right), consisting of a thrift store, an auto repair shop, a United States Post Office, and a coworking space. There is a nearby light industrial park and several small suburban developments. The bulk of the area is rural in character.

The community was the original location of Michie Tavern, before its 1927 relocation adjacent to Monticello. Historic structures still located in Earlysville include Earlysville Union Church, Longwood, and Buck Mountain Episcopal Church.

== Demographics ==
Earlysville first appeared as a census designated place in the 2020 U.S. census.

== Notable people ==
- George Allen; served one term as a United States Senator from Virginia.
- David M. Bailey, singer-songwriter.
- Mark Helprin, novelist, journalist, and conservative commentator.
- Robert P. Kolker, film scholar.
- Robert Llewellyn, photographer.
