= Longwood (Earlysville, Virginia) =

Historic house in Virginia, United States

- U.S. National Register of Historic Places
- Virginia Landmarks Register
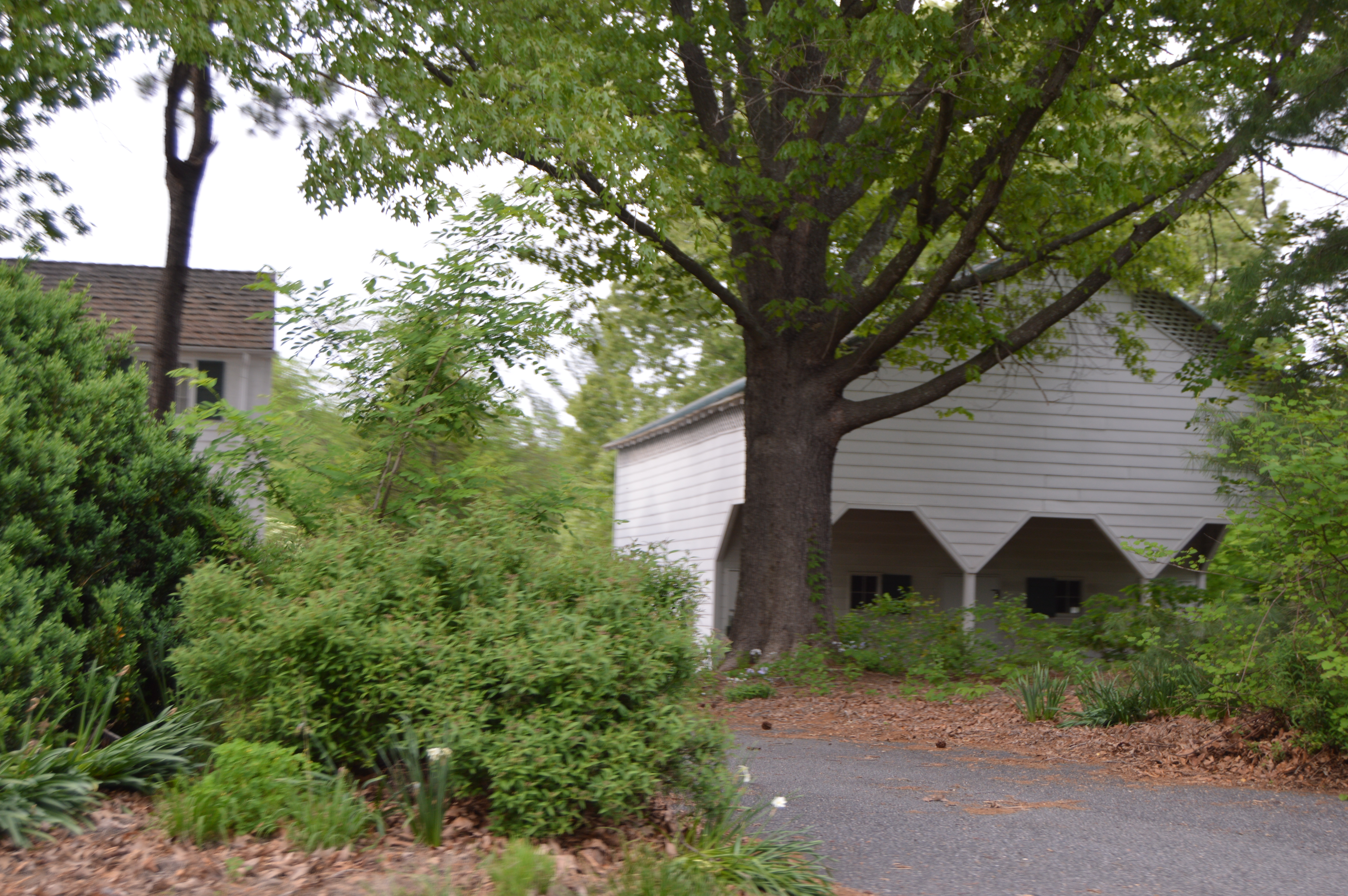
- Roadside view of the barn

- Location within Virginia Location within the United States
- Location: North side of VA 665 at the junction with VA 663 and VA 664, near Earlysville, Virginia
- Coordinates: 38°10′55″N 78°29′54″W
- Area: 183 acres (74 ha)
- Built: c. 1790, 1810-1820, c. 1940
- Architectural style: Federal, Colonial Revival
- NRHP reference No.: 96001074
- VLR No.: 002-0380

Significant dates
- Added to NRHP: October 18, 1996
- Designated VLR: June 19, 1996

Longwood is a historic home and farm located near Earlysville, Albemarle County, Virginia. The house was built about 1790, with additions between 1810 and 1820, and about 1940. It is a two-story, five-bay frame building with a two-story store/post office addition and a small one-story, two-bay, gable-roofed frame wing. It has Federal and Colonial Revival design elements. Also on the property are a contributing frame barn (c. 1890), a frame schoolhouse for African American students [c. 1900), a late-19th-century stone well, and the 19th-century cemetery of the Michie family.

It was added to the National Register of Historic Places in 1996.
