= Rivanna River =

Coordinates: 37.75098°N 78.16361°W

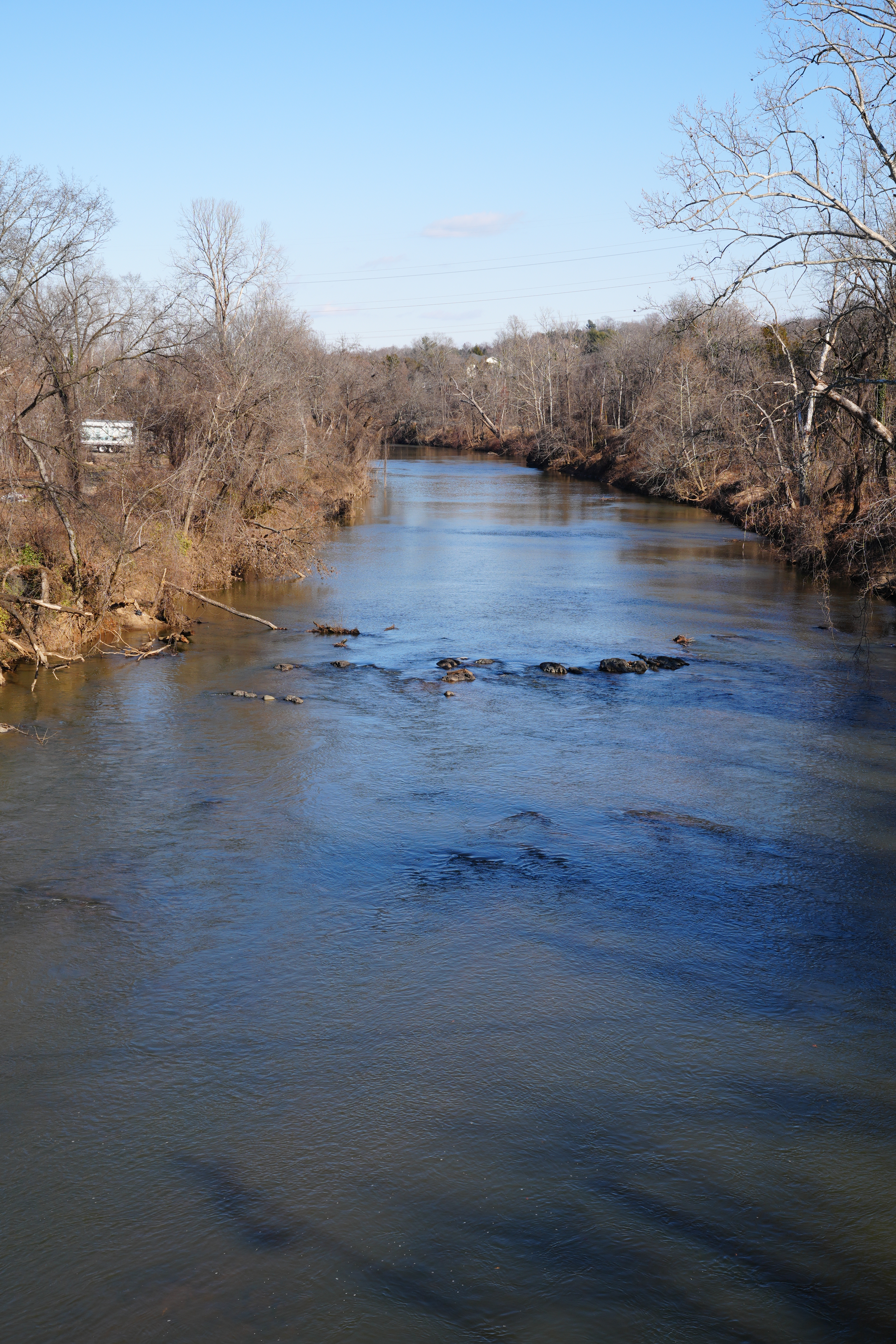
- View of the Rivanna River from US 250 in Pantops, Virginia. Taken 2025.

Physical characteristics
- Length: 42 mi (68 km)

Basin features
- River system: James River

The Rivanna River /rɪˈvænə/ is a 42.1-mile-long (67.8 km) tributary of the James River in central Virginia in the United States. The Rivanna's tributaries originate in the Blue Ridge Mountains; via the James River, it is part of the watershed of the Chesapeake Bay.

According to the Geographic Names Information System, the Rivanna has also been known as "Mountain Falls Creek" and "River Anna".

== Course ==
The Rivanna River is formed in Albemarle County about 4 miles (6.4 km) northeast of Charlottesville by the confluence of two tributaries:

- The North Fork Rivanna River is formed in southwestern Greene County by the confluence of the Lynch River and the Roach River, and flows 18.0 miles (29.0 km) southeast by south into Albemarle County.
- The South Fork Rivanna River is formed in Albemarle County by the confluence of the Moormans River and the Mechums River, and flows 12.9 miles (20.8 km) generally eastwardly.

Below this confluence, the Rivanna flows southeast through Albemarle County, skirting the eastern edge of Charlottesville and breaching the Southwest Mountains near Monticello. The Rivanna continues southeast through Fluvanna County, passing the communities of Lake Monticello and Palmyra; it enters the James River at the town of Columbia.

== History ==
Monacan Indians were the inhabitants of the Rivanna valley at the time of first contact by Europeans. The locations of several sites from the period are known, and some have been explored by archaeologists. One in particular, a mound postulated to be the site of ritual burial and of spiritual significance to the tribe, is located near the confluence of the two forks of the river and was documented by Thomas Jefferson in his 1781 work Notes on the State of Virginia. Several major population centers of the tribe were located along the Rivanna, including Monasukapanough, near the headwaters of the river, and Rassawek, the principal town of the tribe, located at the confluence of the Rivanna and James rivers.

In the late eighteenth century the river was made navigable, partially by the efforts of the Jeffersons who owned much of the lands along its upper course, including Shadwell where Peter Jefferson had built a small mill complex on the river, overlooked by a lofty hill now known as Monticello. Improvements included in the first generation (through approximately 1830) were sluice cuts, small dams, and batteaux locks. Second generation (approx. 1840–1870) improvements had long stretches of canal, serviced by large locks, many of which are still visible along the river today. Shortly after the completion of the initial Rivanna navigational works, Virginia requested that the river be opened to public usage. It is said Jefferson at first refused, but the Commonwealth would not be denied, and the Rivanna became an integral part of the central Virginian transportation network.

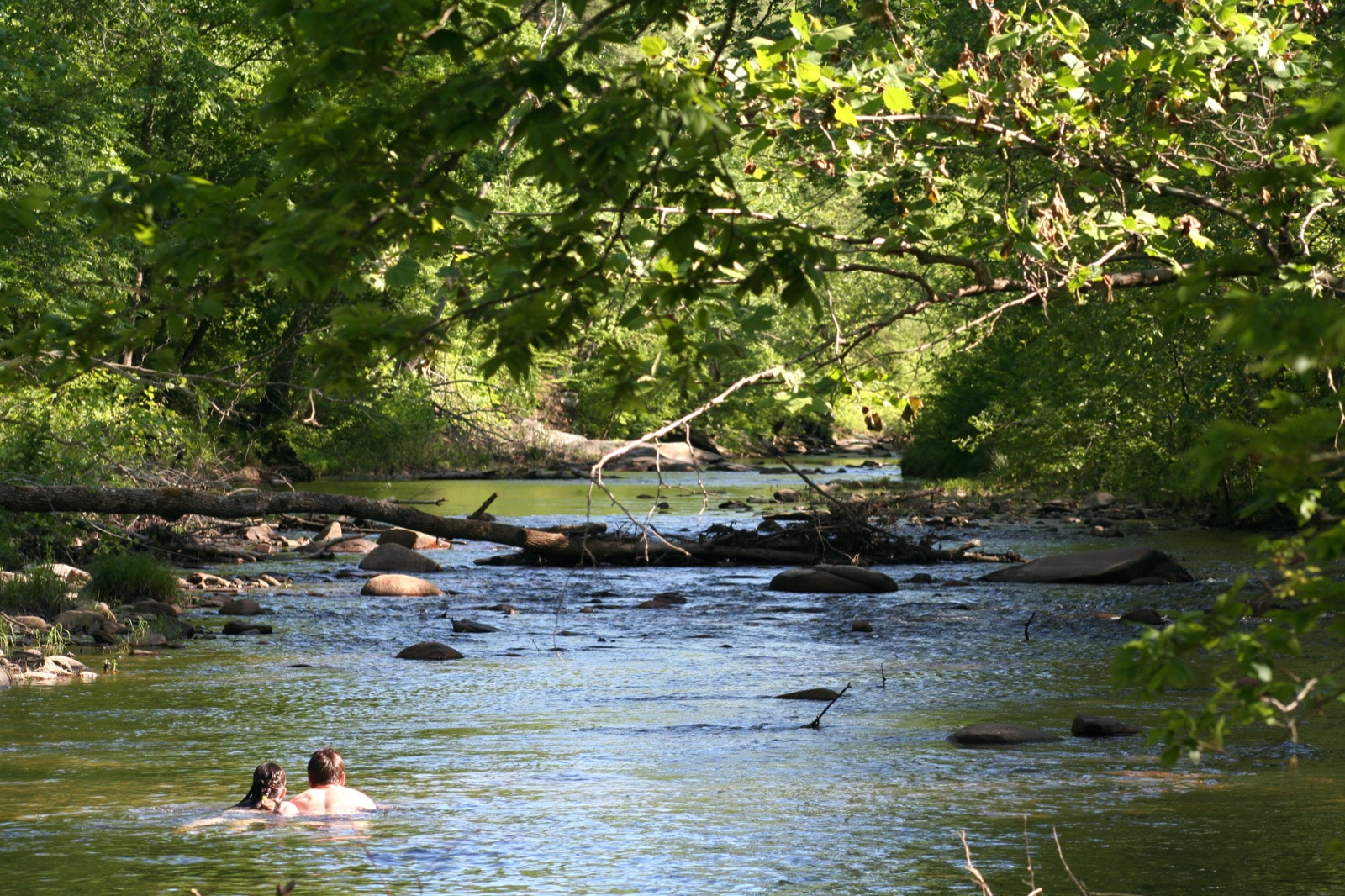
Swimmers in the Rivanna, near Free Union

The route served a large community of farmsteads and plantations throughout Albemarle and Fluvanna counties. It also bore ever-growing numbers of industrial facilities, like those at Union Mills and the Charlottesville Woolen Mills. It was the construction of these larger mills which prompted the great "second generation" improvements to navigation which were coordinated by the Rivanna Navigation Company. Union Mills alone featured a 2.5-mile-long (4.0 km) canal and towpath, one upper and two massive lower locks, all directly upon the river.

Where the Rivanna meets the James River at Columbia so too did the 4.5-mile-long (7.2 km) Rivanna Connexion canal merge with the James River and Kanawha Canal, which was intended to connect Richmond with the Ohio River and the West. The series of locks which connected the two works lie just outside the town, and are mostly buried by sediment today.

In the batteaux era Milton was the head of navigation along the river, but by the mid-nineteenth century horse-drawn canal boats were traveling all the way upstream to Charlottesville, where the head of navigation was located at the very point where the Fredericksburg Road (now VA 20) and Three Chopt Road (U.S. Route 250), the primary road to Richmond (before the construction of Interstate 64), meet and enter the city over the Free Bridge, establishing the city as a major commercial hub.

During the late twentieth century the river saw the establishment of the Rivanna Trail, a greenbelt trail that encircles the city of Charlottesville. As its name suggests the trail was originally envisioned as a river-front promenade, after the San Antonio River Walk, but the plan was soon enlarged under the guidance of the Rivanna Trails Foundation. It now takes hikers all the way around Charlottesville, passing through many of the city's parks and the wooded lands surrounding it, totaling over 20 miles (32 km) in length.

== Management and conservation ==
The Rivanna River is the focus of considerable conservation efforts. In the early 1990s a group of concerned citizens (Roger Black, David Carter, Chet Maxey and Steve Pence) joined together to create the Rivanna Conservation Society, (RCS) a nonprofit with the mission of preserving the Rivanna’s scenic, cultural, historic and ecological attributes. In the late 1990s the Thomas Jefferson Planning District Commission convened an EPA-funded multi-stakeholder conservation planning effort, and in 1998 this Rivanna River Roundtable published its State of the Basin report identifying key management and conservation needs. In 2001, The Nature Conservancy, noting its many endemic and rare species including the endangered James River spinymussel, identified the Rivanna basin as “one of the finest remaining freshwater river and stream systems in the Piedmont.” In 2002 a local scientist, John Murphy, founded a community-based monitoring program named StreamWatch. The StreamWatch benthic water quality monitoring program created a watershed-wide intensive data collection at permanent stream monitoring sites throughout the Rivanna and its tributaries. Note: In 2016 the Rivanna Conservation Society and StreamWatch merged into a single nonprofit: The Rivanna Conservation Alliance (RCA). In 2006 The Nature Conservancy raised funds and approached local governments to successfully facilitate the establishment of the Rivanna River Basin Commission, a multi-jurisdictional body composed of local elected officials, Soil and Water Conservation District representatives, and citizens.

In 2008 the Rivanna River Basin Commission Technical Advisory Committee identified altered hydrology and sediment pollution as principal threats to the health of the system. (In general, altered hydrology refers changes in flow regime due to impervious land cover, withdrawals, and dams. The Technical Committee’s findings regarding the Rivanna were limited to land-cover mediated hydrological alteration).

The Rivanna is a source of drinking water to the Charlottesville area and Lake Monticello. Water supply management and planning have been somewhat controversial. In 2006 a plan to expand water supply by piping water from South Fork Rivanna Reservoir to an enlarged Ragged Mountain Reservoir gained wide endorsement from environmental organizations, the water authority, and permitting agencies. Subsequently, however, some citizens have criticized the plan on the basis of cost, and have encouraged further research about dredging the South Fork Rivanna Reservoir.

In most respects, Rivanna management and conservation efforts have been marked by significant cooperation among diverse stakeholders. The Rivanna River Basin Commission and the community monitoring program (StreamWatch) feature substantial participation by citizens, the conservation community (e.g. Rivanna Conservation Alliance), local governments (Albemarle County, Fluvanna County, Greene County, and the City of Charlottesville), resource management agencies (Virginia Department of Environmental Quality, Virginia Department of Game and Inland Fisheries, Thomas Jefferson Soil and Water Conservation District) and quasi-governmental organizations (Rivanna Water and Sewer Authority, Thomas Jefferson Planning District Commission).

== See also ==
- List of Virginia rivers
