= Buck Mountain (Madison County, Missouri) =

Mountain in Missouri, U.S.

Coordinates: 37°36′29″N 90°23′33″W

Buck Mountain is a summit in Madison County in the U.S. state of Missouri. The summit has an elevation of 1,129 feet (344 m).

Buck Mountain was so named because the area was the hunting ground of bucks by early settlers.
