= Charles Constantine Pise =

American priest

The Reverend Charles Constantine Pise SJ
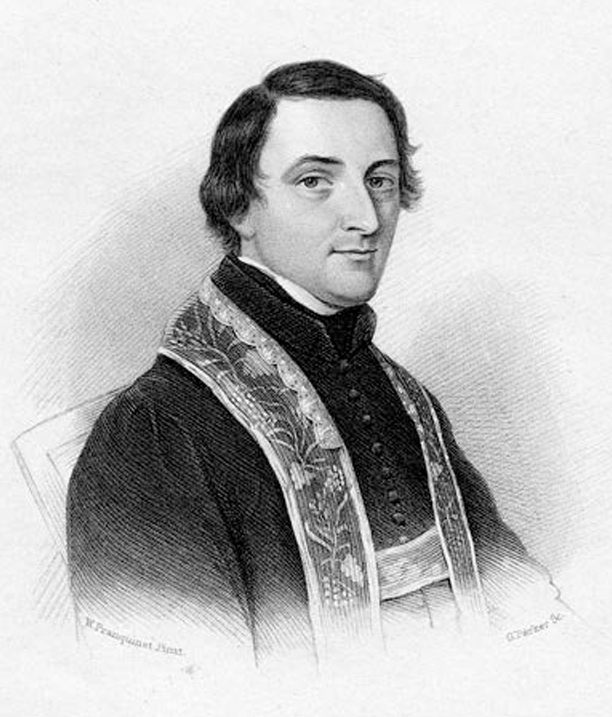
- Portrait of Pise

Orders
- Ordination: 1825

Personal details
- Born: November 22, 1801 Annapolis, Maryland, U.S.
- Died: May 26, 1866 (aged 64) Brooklyn, New York, U.S.

Charles Constantine Pise SJ (November 22, 1801 – May 26, 1866) was an American Roman Catholic priest and writer.

Born in Annapolis, Maryland, on 22 November 1801, "the son of an Italian father and a mother who came from an old Philadelphia family," he was educated at Georgetown College in Washington, D.C., sent to Rome to continue studies, and entered the Society of Jesus as a novice. He left the Jesuits when the death of his father caused him to return to the United States and was ordained a diocesan priest in 1825.

From 1821-22 he attended Mount St. Mary's College and Seminary in Emmitsburg, Maryland. During his stay there, his classmates included three future archbishops: John McCloskey, John Baptist Purcell, and John Hughes.

He wrote several works in prose and verse, and was a distinguished lecturer and preacher. Among his many literary works, he wrote three Catholic devotional novels and one semi-fictional work, Letters to Ada.

Between 1827-30, he published a five-volume History of the Church from Its Establishment to the Present Century (although the work stopped at the 16th century). In honor of this effort, Pope Gregory XVI made him a knight of the Sacred Palace and Count Palatine, "the first time these honors had come to an American." At this point, he was also made a knight of the Holy Roman Empire and was granted a Doctor of Divinity degree by examination.

During these years, Pise was an assistant at St. Patrick's Church in Washington, DC. Henry Clay arranged for him to be appointed Chaplain of the Senate. Pise served as Chaplain from 1832-33. Pise was the first (and, to date, only) Roman Catholic United States Senate Chaplain, coming into that office on December 11, 1832.

Answering objections to the presence of a Catholic in such a prominent government role, and prefiguring a similar speech by John F. Kennedy more than 125 years later, on July 4, 1833, Pise made "an eloquent address" before the Maryland House of Delegates describing in what sense he felt an American Roman Catholic owed 'allegiance' to the Pope.

In 1849, he was assigned as rector at Saint Charles Borromeo Church in Brooklyn, New York; he died in Brooklyn on May 26, 1866.

Pise had a career of such prominence that it was unusual he was not made a bishop. One biographer suggests that his friendship with Catholic intellectual Orestes Brownson may have been the problem, at a time when the American Church was turning away from intellectualism as a result of growing Irish domination. Alternatively, the same biographer suggests that it may have been an anti-Irish, anti-Jesuit streak in Ambrose Maréchal, Bishop of Baltimore, which led him to suppress this logical cap to Pise's career.

== Bibliography ==
Partial list:

- History of the Church from Its Establishment to the Present Century., P. Blenkinsop, (1827).
- Father Rowland: a North American Tale. Baltimore: Fielding Lucas, Jr. (1829, 1831) Dublin: (1837, 1846)

(a response to the anti-Catholic novel Father Clement: A Roman Catholic Story by Grace Kennedy, published in 1823).

- The Indian Cottage, a Unitarian Story. Baltimore: Fielding Lucas, Jr. (1831).
- The Pleasures of Religion and Other Poems, Philadelphia: E. L. Carey & A. Hart, (1833) (dedicated to Washington Irving).
- Letters to Ada, From Her Brother-In-Law. Harper and Brothers (1834).
- Address Delivered Before the Philodemic Society of Georgetown College, July 25, 1837, Washington: Jacob Gideon Jr., (1837).
- Aletheia: letters on the truth of Catholic doctrines, New York: E. Dunnigan, 1843.
- Zenosius; or The Pilgrim Convert., London: Charles Dolman (1850) (his last novel).
- Christianity and the Church. (1850).
- First Flow'ret of the Desert Wild (1851) [hymn for Saint Rose of Lima].
- Let the Deep Organ Swell the Lay (1851) [hymn for Saint Cecilia].

Both hymns are in the "Appendix" to the 1851 New York edition of Edward Caswall's Lyra Catholica, pp. 422, 427.

- The Founders of the Jesuits: Saint Ignatius and His First Companions, New York: T. McCurtain, (1868).
- Saint Ignatius and His First Companions, 1894.

Religious titles
Preceded by John Price Durbin	28th Chaplain of the United States Senate; December 11, 1832 – December 10, 1833	Succeeded by Frederick Winslow Hatch
