= Dyke, Virginia =

Unincorporated community in Virginia, United States

Coordinates: 38°15′13″N 78°32′23″W

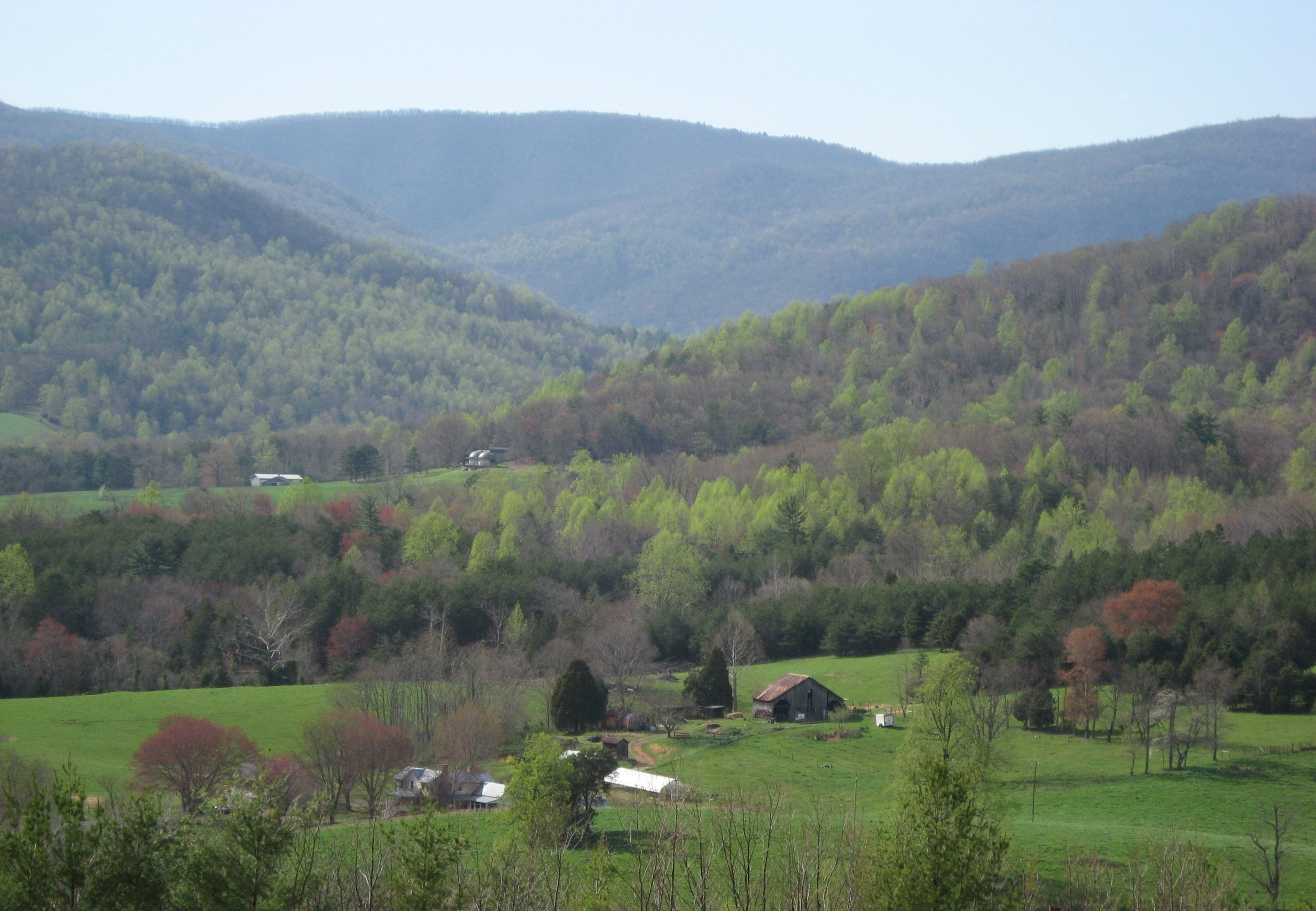
The Blue Ridge Mountains below Dyke

Dyke is an unincorporated community in Greene County, Virginia, United States. It is located along Virginia Secondary State Route 810.

In 2020, the small store in Dyke was replaced with a larger one and a gas station, located near Saint George and The Blue Ridge School.

Estes Farm was added to the National Register of Historic Places in 2006. Binghams United Methodist Church, formerly known as Austin's Meeting House, established in 1796, is on the north side of the Lynch River. Rev. John Gibson, a farmer and landowner, preached there for years.

== History ==
The region was settled in the southwestern part of what was then Orange County in the 18th century, becoming part of Greene County in 1838 when it was formed from the western part of Orange. Dyke is believed to have been named in the 19th century after a family of enslaved people with roots in West Africa who lived here. In 1860, nearly 40 percent of the more than 5,000 inhabitants in Greene County were enslaved people.

Among the early settlers in Dyke were families named Parrott, Gibson, Austin, Shifflet, Ogg and White. James White purchased acreage from his uncle in 1788 between Brokenback mountain and Ogg (Bingham) mountain next to the Lynch River and close to Nortonsville in Albemarle County. He was the first-born son of Cornelius White and the grandson of John White, the emigrant of Leicestershire who had a tobacco plantation north of Dyke near Ruckersville and Scuffletown. The inventory of James White's estate in 1825 listed the names and values of twenty enslaved human beings: "Tom, $425. Palnik or Patrick, $450. No name, $400. Sam, $400. Rachel and child Louisa, $350. Mary, $350. Charlotte, $325. Hannah, $300. Nancy and child Elisa, $350. Jenny and child Patty, $325. Mary, $300. Negro girl Lucinda and child, $300. Negro girl Keziah, $175. George, $100. Caesar, of no value. Molly, of no value." His son James Early White succeeded and in 1852 upon the death of his mother, Susanna Bourne, he moved to Illinois and then to farmland north of St. Catharine, Missouri.
