= Buck Mountain (St. Francois County, Missouri) =

Summit in the US state of Missouri

- Location within Missouri

Highest point
- Elevation: 1,529 ft (466 m)
- Coordinates: 37°39′50″N 90°31′47″W

Geography
- Location: St. Francois County, Missouri, U.S.
- Parent range: Saint Francois Mountains
- Topo map: USGS Iron Mountain Lake

Buck Mountain is a summit in southern St. Francois County in the U.S. state of Missouri. Buck Mountain has an elevation of 1,529 feet (466 m). The mountain lies east of Missouri Route V about six miles northeast of Pilot Knob and about six miles southwest of Doe Run.

Buck Mountain was so named on account of deer in the area.
