= Nortonsville, Virginia =

Unincorporated community in Virginia, United States

Nortonsville
- Unincorporated community
- Location within the Commonwealth of Virginia Nortonsville (the United States)
- Coordinates: 38°14′14″N 78°32′53″W
- Country: United States
- State: Virginia
- County: Albemarle
- Time zone: UTC−5 (Eastern (EST))
  - Summer (DST): UTC−4 (EDT)
- GNIS feature ID: 1495075

Nortonsville is an unincorporated community in Albemarle County, Virginia, United States. It is on the northern border of Albemarle County, near the Lynch River, which shares its border with Greene County.

== History ==
The village was named for Cyprian C. Norton, who, in 1835, lent his name to the post office established here.

The post office structure, with 21 rooms, remains from the 19th century on a property that included, at the time, a home, store, post office, doctor, dentist, schoolhouse, barber shop, blacksmith shop, garage, and working mill. The Louis Cranston Parrish family ran the post office in the 20th century.

The historic Binghams United Methodist Church, established in 1796, is a half mile northeast of Nortonsville, on the north side of the Lynch River, in Dyke. Rev. John Gibson, a farmer and landowner, preached there for years.
