= Buck Mountain Episcopal Church =

- Buck Mountain Church
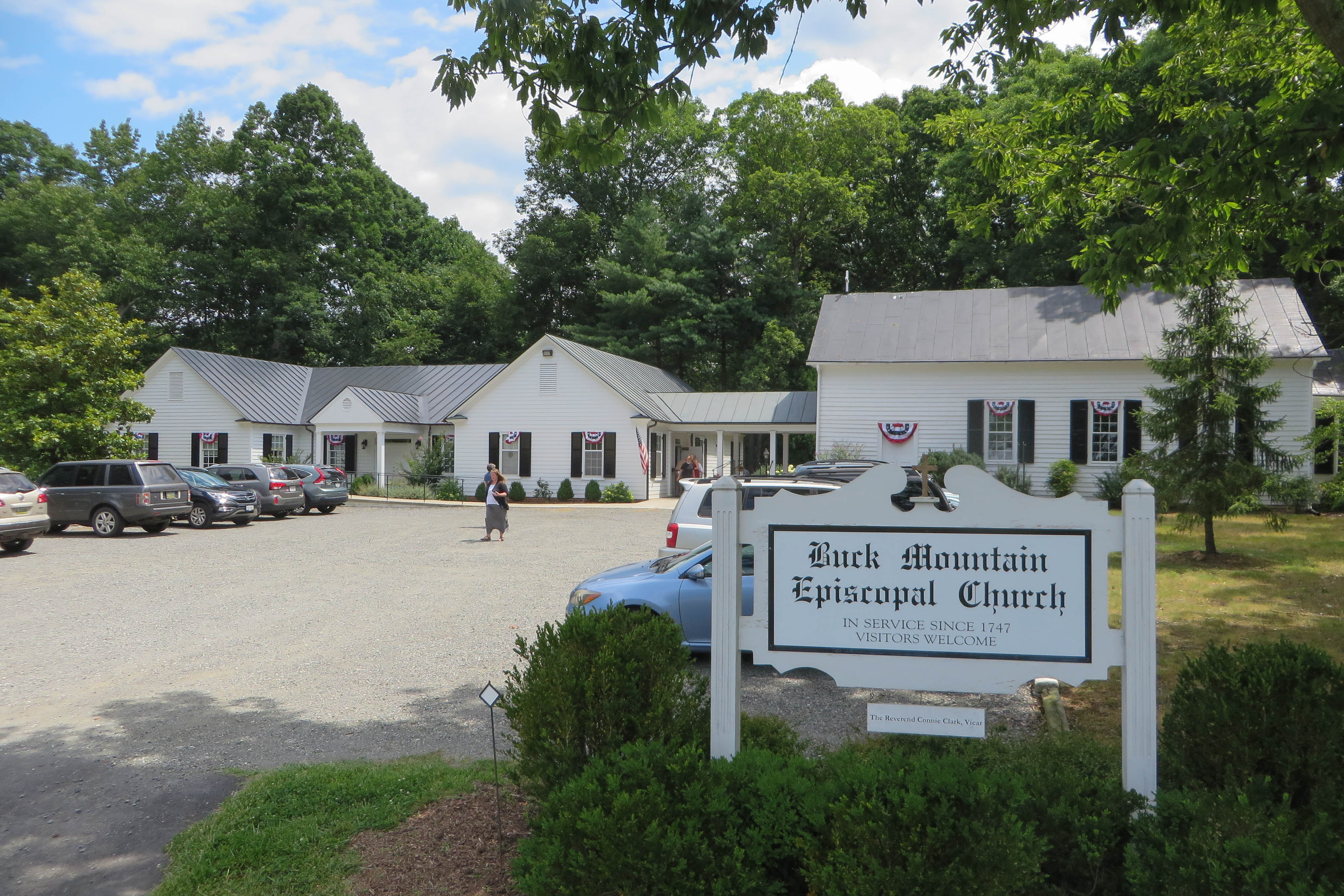
- Photo of exterior of Buck Mountain Episcopal Church

- Location within Virginia Location within the United States
- 38°09′11″N 78°28′49″W
- Type: church
- Location: 4133 Earlysville Rd (VA 743), Earlysville, Virginia (Charlottesville vicinity)

History
- Built: 1747

Site notes
- Architectural style: Greek Revival
- Restored: 1860
- Governing body: Diocese of Virginia

Virginia Landmarks Register
- Designated: August 15, 1972
- Reference no.: 002-0145

Buck Mountain Episcopal Church is a historic Episcopal church located on VA 743, northwest of the junction with VA 633 in Earlysville, Virginia. It is a rare surviving example of the simple wooden Anglican parish churches scattered through Virginia in the colonial period, and it is considered one of the finest surviving examples of rural Virginia Greek Revival churches. One of three churches erected to serve Frederick Parish, the original building was completed between 1747 and 1750. The church was moved to its present site (approximately one mile from its original location) in 1860. Buck Mountain is now a parish church in the Episcopal Diocese of Virginia.

== See also ==
- Episcopal Diocese of Virginia
- Frederick W. Hatch (clergy)
