= Daniel Bradford Devore =

United States Army general

Daniel B. Devore
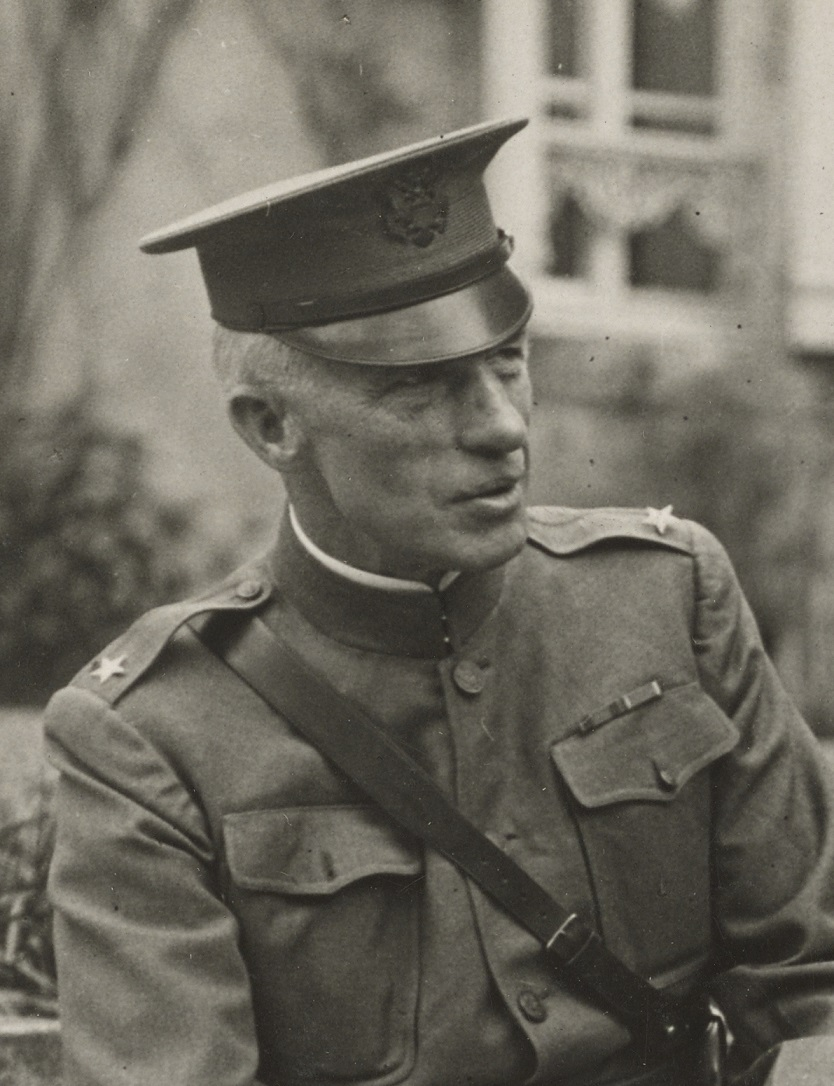
- Brigadier General Daniel B. Devore in France, October 1918
- Born: May 14, 1860; Monroe County, Ohio
- Died: March 10, 1956 (aged 95); Washington, D.C.
- Spouse: Helen Gray Stewart
- Military career
- Allegiance: United States
- Branch: United States Army
- Service years: 1885–1922
- Rank: Brigadier General
- Service number: 0-150
- Conflicts: World War I

Daniel Bradford Devore (May 14, 1860 – March 10, 1956) was a United States Army officer in the late 19th and early 20th centuries. In World War I he became a brigadier general and commanded a regiment of the US army.

== Military career ==
Devore was born on May 14, 1860, in Monroe County, Ohio. he graduated 29th from the United States Military Academy (USMA) at West Point, New York in 1885. His classmates included Willard A. Holbrook, Robert A. Brown, Robert Michie, Beaumont B. Buck, Henry P. McCain, Joseph E. Kuhn, Charles H. Muir, John D. Barrette, John M. Carson Jr., William F. Martin, George W. Burr and Robert Lee Bullard. All of these men would, like Devore himself, attain the rank of general officer.

He was commissioned into the 23rd Infantry Regiment. After serving from 1891 to 1892 as an aide to Major General David S. Stanley, Devore taught mathematics at the U.S. Military Academy from 1892 to 1897. Between 1897 and 1898, he served on special duty for the United States Secretary of War, purchasing 538 reindeer in Norway and transporting 537 of them to Seattle in order to be used in Alaska.

Devore served in the Philippines between 1899 and 1901 as well as between 1903 and 1906, and between 1906 and 1907, he served as the constructing quartermaster at the Madison Barracks. Devore was serving with his regiment at the Jamestown Exposition and at the McKinley Monument's dedication. After commanding a post between 1908 and 1909 in Holguín, Cuba, Devore served on the General Staff between 1911 and 1914. Between 1916 and early 1917, he commanded the 10th Infantry Regiment in the Panama Canal Zone.

Devore organized the 45th and 46th Infantry Regiments, with soldiers from the 10th Infantry, after World War I began. After his temporary promotion to the rank of brigadier general on August 5, 1917, he called the Illinois National Guard into service and commanded the 167th Infantry Brigade in France between September and December 1918.

After returning to the U.S., Devore, now a colonel again, commanded Camp Logan, served in Chicago, commanded the 10th Infantry in Ohio, and served as adjutant general in New York. Though retiring on April 5, 1922, as a colonel, Devore had his brigadier general rank restored by Congress in June 1930. He died in Washington, D.C., on March 10, 1956.

== Bibliography ==
- Davis, Henry Blaine Jr. (1998). Generals in Khaki. Raleigh, North Carolina: Pentland Press. ISBN 1571970886. OCLC 40298151.
- Marquis Who's Who (1975). Who Was Who In American History – The Military. Chicago, Illinois: Marquis Who's Who. ISBN 0837932017.
