= General Holbrook =

General Holbrook may refer to:

- Lucius Roy Holbrook (1875–1952), U.S. Army major general
- Willard Ames Holbrook (1860–1932), U.S. Army major general
- Willard Ames Holbrook Jr. (1898–1986), U.S. Army brigadier general
