= William Franklin Martin =

United States Army general

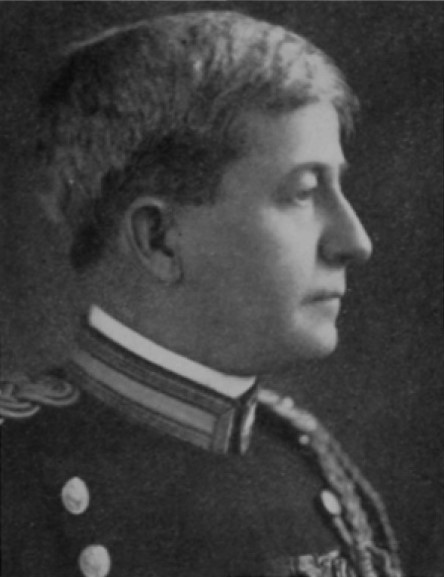
- Born: July 19, 1863; Ripley, Ohio
- Died: April 15, 1942 (aged 78); Atlanta, Georgia
- Spouse: Josephine Edgerton
- Military career
- Allegiance: United States
- Branch: United States Army
- Service years: 1885–1927
- Rank: Brigadier General
- Service number: 0-152
- Commands: 87th Infantry Division; 174th Infantry Brigade; 26th Infantry Regiment; 15th Infantry Regiment
- Conflicts: Spanish–American War; Philippine–American War; World War I

William Franklin Martin (July 19, 1863 – April 15, 1942) was a United States Army soldier who became a brigadier general.

== Early life and education ==
William Franklin Martin was born on July 19, 1863, to Robert F. Martin and Mary E. (Lilley) Martin in Ripley, Ohio. Raised in Xenia, Ohio, he entered the United States Military Academy (USMA) at West Point, New York in 1881. In June 1885, Martin graduated number thirty-seven of thirty-nine in his class. Among his classmates included several men who would later rise to the rank of brigadier general or higher in their military careers, such as Joseph E. Kuhn, Charles H. Muir, John D. Barrette, Robert A. Brown, John M. Carson, Willard A. Holbrook, Henry P. McCain, Robert Michie, Robert L. Bullard, Daniel B. Devore, and Beaumont B. Buck.

== Military career ==
After graduating, Martin was commissioned to the 25th Infantry and was on frontier duty from 1881 to 1891. During the Spanish–American War, he was in Cuba from 1899 to 1900, then spent time in the Philippines from 1900 to 1903, only to return to Cuba from 1906 to 1908. Martin graduated from the United States Army War College in 1913.

Before World War I, Martin was on the General Staff from 1914 to 1917, but then received a temporary promotion to brigadier general on August 5, 1917. He was commander of the 174th Infantry Brigade at Camp Pike in Little Rock, Arkansas. Martin sailed for Europe with his troops aboard the transport SS Persic, which was damaged en route by a torpedo from the German submarine SM UB-87 in September 1918 near the Isles of Scilly. The embarked soldiers were transferred to four British destroyers without loss of life. Martin remained on the Persic until all of his men had been safely evacuated. In France, he later commanded the 87th Infantry Division from November 22, 1918, until January 1919, when the division became inactive.

After the war, Martin reverted to his permanent rank of colonel on May 15, 1919. From February to October 1920, he commanded the 26th Infantry at Camp Zachary Taylor in Kentucky. After graduating from a course at the Infantry School in June 1921, Martin commanded the 15th Infantry at Tientsin, China until December 1922. On July 19, 1927, he retired as a colonel, having reached the mandatory retirement age of 64. On June 21, 1930, Martin was advanced to brigadier general on the retired list.

== Personal life ==
On July 20, 1892, Martin married Josephine Edgerton, the daughter of Joseph K. Edgerton, a former U.S. Congressman from Indiana. They had one daughter and three grandchildren.

Martin spent his retirement in Atlanta, Georgia. He died on April 15, 1942, in the Station Hospital at Fort McPherson. Martin was buried at Arlington National Cemetery on April 20, 1942.
