= Charles Henry Muir =

United States Army general (1860–1933)

Charles Muir
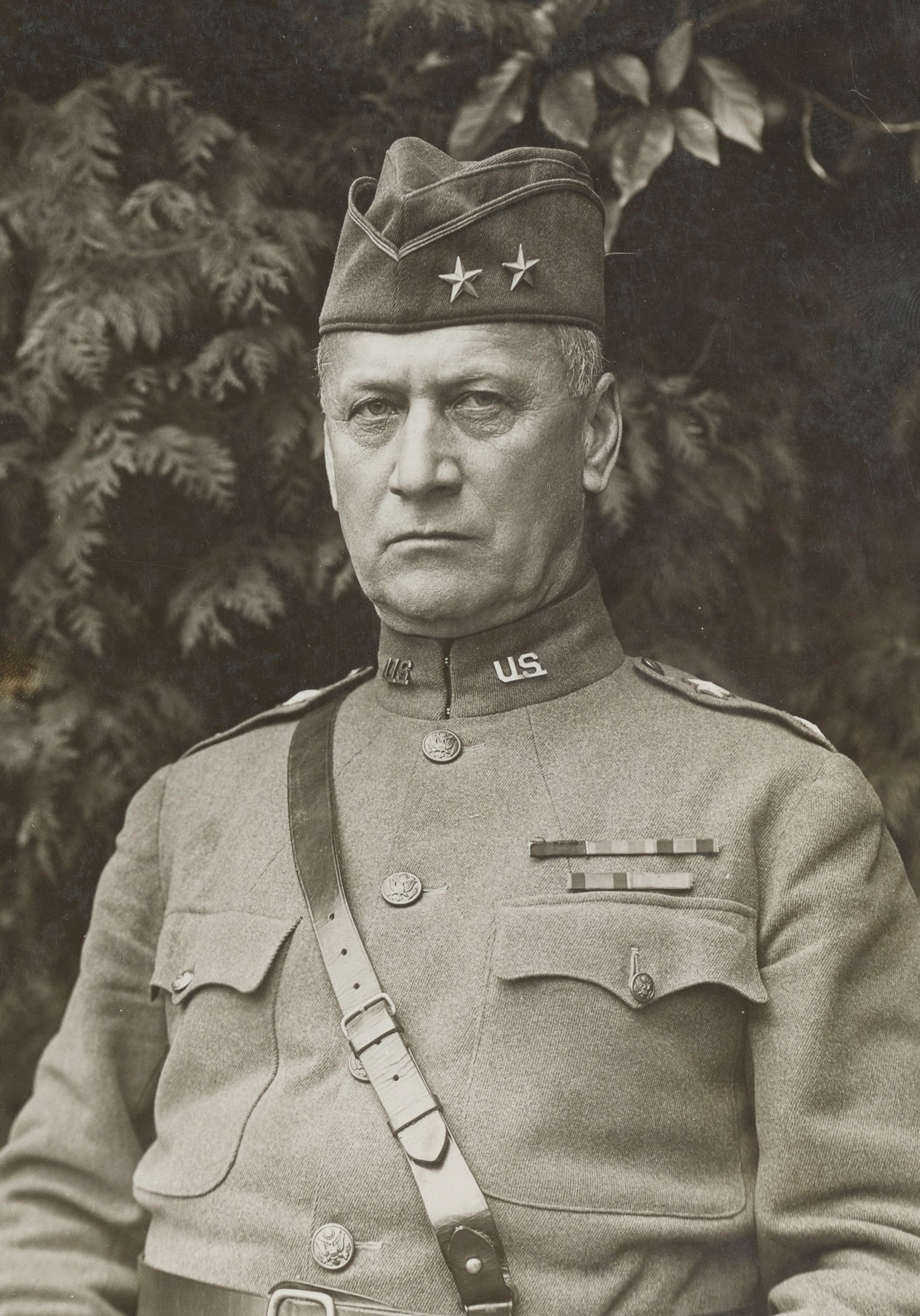
- Born: 18 July 1860; Erie Township, Michigan, United States
- Died: 8 December 1933 (aged 73); Baltimore, Maryland, United States
- Burial place: Arlington National Cemetery, Virginia, United States
- Relatives: MG James I. Muir (son)
- Military career
- Allegiance: United States
- Branch: United States Army
- Service years: 1885–1920
- Rank: Major General
- Nickname: "Uncle Charley"
- Service number: 0-33
- Commands: 28th Division; IV Corps; United States Army Command and General Staff College
- Conflicts: Spanish–American War; Philippine–American War; Occupation of Cuba; World War I: Champagne-Marne campaign; Aisne-Marne campaign; Oise-Aisne campaign; Meuse–Argonne offensive
- Awards: Indian Campaign Medal Spanish Campaign Medal; Distinguished Service Cross (United States); Army Distinguished Service Medal; Silver Star; Army of Cuban Occupation Medal; Philippine Campaign Medal; China Relief Expedition Medal; Croix de Guerre (with palms); French Legion of Honor (Commandeur) Order of St Michael and St George (Knight Commander)

Charles Henry Muir (July 18, 1860 – December 8, 1933) was a United States Army officer. He served from 1885 to 1920, and attained the rank of major general.

During the final year of World War I, he commanded the 28th Division throughout most of its service on the Western Front. Previously, he served on active duty during the American Indian Wars, the Spanish–American War, the Philippine–American War, and the occupation of Cuba.

== Military career ==
Muir received an appointment to the United States Military Academy (USMA) at West Point, New York in 1881, graduating eighth in his class in 1885. Among his classmates included several officers who would become future general officers, such as Beaumont B. Buck, Joseph E. Kuhn, Henry P. McCain, Robert Michie, George W. Burr, John D. Barrette, John M. Carson Jr., Robert A. Brown, Robert Lee Bullard, William F. Martin, Daniel B. Devore and Willard A. Holbrook.

After receiving his commission as a second lieutenant in the United States Army, Muir was sent to Dakota Territory and later to Fort D. A. Russell in Wyoming. He held first place on the Army Rifle Team in 1890. In 1895, Muir graduated at the head of his class from the Infantry and Cavalry School in Fort Leavenworth in Kansas.

Muir was deployed to Cuba during the Spanish–American War, where he received the Distinguished Service Cross for gallantry in action during the Battle of Santiago de Cuba. On July 2, 1898, he had voluntarily exposed himself to heavy enemy artillery and infantry fire in an action which resulted in the silencing of a piece of Spanish artillery.

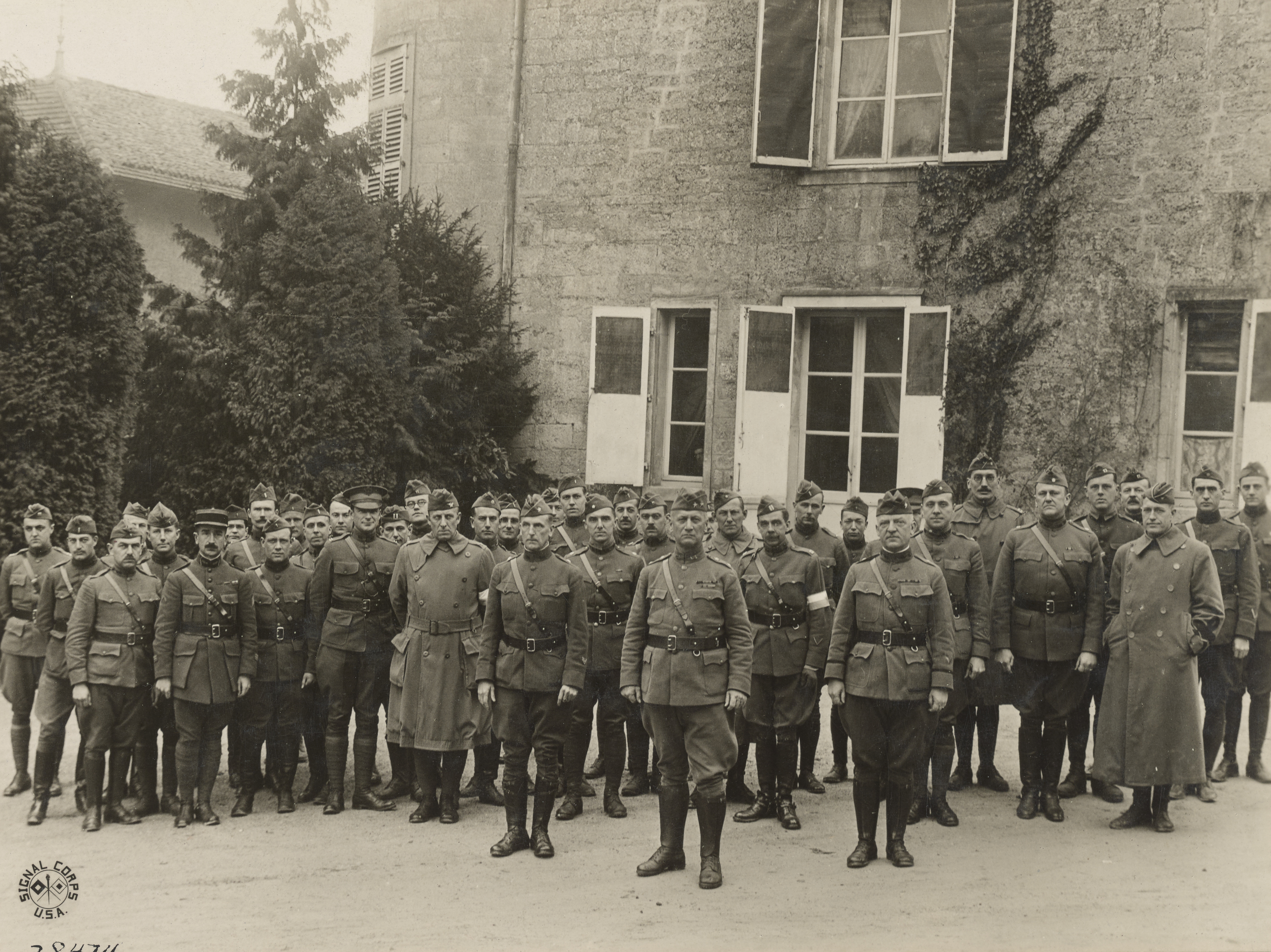
Major General Muir, the newly appointed commander of U.S. IV Corps, pictured here with his staff at Boucq, Meuse, France, October 31, 1918. Stood to Muir's left is his chief of staff, Brigadier General Briant H. Wells while Joseph Stilwell, then a major, stands to his right in the rank behind.

Muir was promoted to captain on 2 March 1899. Later that year he was promoted to major and sent to the Philippines. On 19 January 1900, Muir and ten other American soldiers attacked the headquarters of General Miguel Malvar at Rosario in Batangas province, driving Malvar and his men out. Muir's unit took possession of 25,000 Mexican pesos from Malvar's treasury and released 300 Spanish prisoners.

From 1903 to 1907, he was a member of the general staff at Washington, D.C.

Major General Muir succeeded Charles M. Clement as Commander of the 28th Division from 15 December 1917 until 23 October 1918, when he was succeeded by William H. Hay. Muir commanded IV Corps, aided by Briant H. Wells as his chief of staff, until April, 1919 when he succeeded Hay as commander of the 28th Division and led it to the United States for its post-war demobilization. He was succeeded by William G. Price Jr. when the division was reorganized as part of the Pennsylvania National Guard.

From July 1919 to August 1920, MG Muir served as Commandant of the United States Army Command and General Staff College. His final duty assignment was commander of the Third Corps Area, after which he retired from the army with the permanent rank of major general.

== Awards ==
He received the Distinguished Service Cross, the Army Distinguished Service Medal, and a Silver Star Citation. From France, he received a Croix de Guerre. He was made a Knight Commander of the Order of St Michael and St George.

== Death and legacy ==
He died at the age of 73 on December 8, 1933 and is buried in Arlington National Cemetery.

== Family ==
In 1887, Muir married May Bennett, the daughter of Colonel Clarence Edmund Bennett. They were the parents of three sons and a daughter, including James I. Muir, who was a career army officer and attained the rank of major general as commander of the 44th Infantry Division during World War II.

== Namesakes ==
- Muir Army Airfield
- USS General C. H. Muir (AP-142) a transport ship
  - The General Muir, restaurant and deli, Atlanta, Georgia, is named for the ship.

== Bibliography ==
- Davis, Henry Blaine Jr. (1998). Generals in Khaki. Raleigh, North Carolina: Pentland Press. ISBN 1571970886. OCLC 40298151.
- Venzon, Anne Cipriano (2013). The United States in the First World War: an Encyclopedia. Hoboken, NJ: Taylor and Francis. ISBN 978-1-135-68453-2. OCLC 865332376.

Military offices
Preceded by Charles M. Clement	Commanding General 28th Infantry Division; 1917–1918	Succeeded by William H. Hay
Preceded by Joseph T. Dickman	Commanding General IV Corps; 1918–1919	Succeeded by ??
Preceded by William H. Hay	Commanding General 28th Infantry Division; 1919–1920	Succeeded by William G. Price Jr.
Preceded by William A. Shunk	Commandant of the United States Army Command and General Staff College; 1919–1920	Succeeded by Lucius Roy Holbrook
