= Robert Lee Bullard =

United States Army general (1861–1947)

Robert L. Bullard
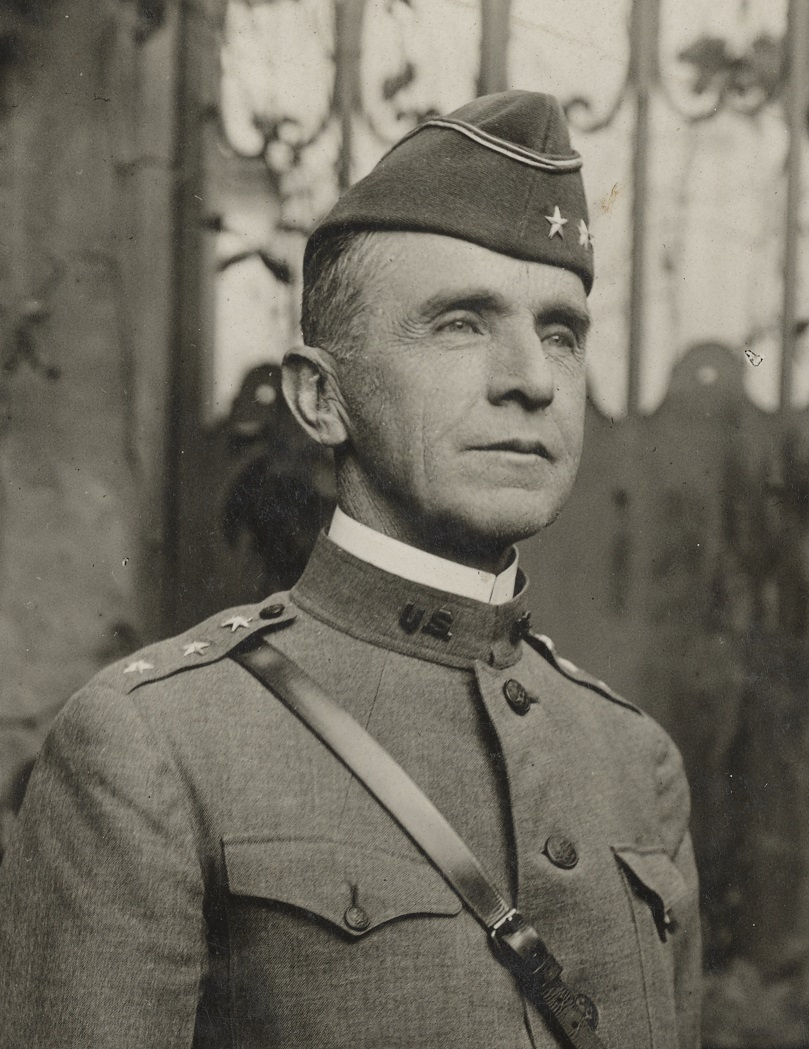
- Bullard in October 1918.
- Born: January 5, 1861; Lee County, Alabama, United States
- Died: September 11, 1947 (aged 86); New York City, United States
- Burial place: West Point Cemetery
- Military career
- Allegiance: United States
- Branch: United States Army
- Service years: 1885–1925
- Rank: Lieutenant General
- Service number: 0-16
- Unit: Infantry Branch
- Commands: 26th Infantry Regiment; 2nd Brigade; 1st Infantry Division; III Corps; Second Army
- Conflicts: Spanish–American War; Philippine–American War; Mexican Border Service; World War I
- Awards: Army Distinguished Service Medal
- Other work: President of the National Security League author orator

Lieutenant General Robert Lee Bullard (January 5, 1861 – September 11, 1947) was a senior officer of the United States Army. He was involved in conflicts in the American Western Frontier, the Philippines, and World War I, where he commanded the 1st Infantry Division (nicknamed "The Big Red One") during the Battle of Cantigny while serving on the Western Front. He later was an administrator in Cuba.

== Military career ==
A native of Alabama, Bullard attended the Agricultural and Mechanical College of Alabama, now Auburn University, and the United States Military Academy (USMA) at West Point, New York, graduated twenty-seventh in a class of thirty-nine in 1885. Among his classmates who also became general officers were Beaumont B. Buck, Joseph E. Kuhn, Henry P. McCain, Robert Michie, George W. Burr, John D. Barrette, John M. Carson Jr., Robert A. Brown, Charles H. Muir, William F. Martin, Daniel B. Devore and Willard A. Holbrook.

He was promoted to first lieutenant in 1892. He served in various capacities in the Spanish–American War, and in the Philippines from 1902 to 1904. He was made lieutenant colonel in 1906. In 1907, he was special investigator for the U.S. provisional government in Cuba, and the following year was superintendent of public instruction there. In 1911, he was promoted to colonel. He attended the U.S. Army War College from 1911 to 1912.

=== Bullard's Indians ===
The 39th Volunteer Infantry was unit of United States Volunteers raised to fight in the Philippine–American War. Bullard was promoted to colonel and given command of the unit. It was nicknamed the "Bullard's Indians" due to the type of tactics the unit employed.

=== World War I ===
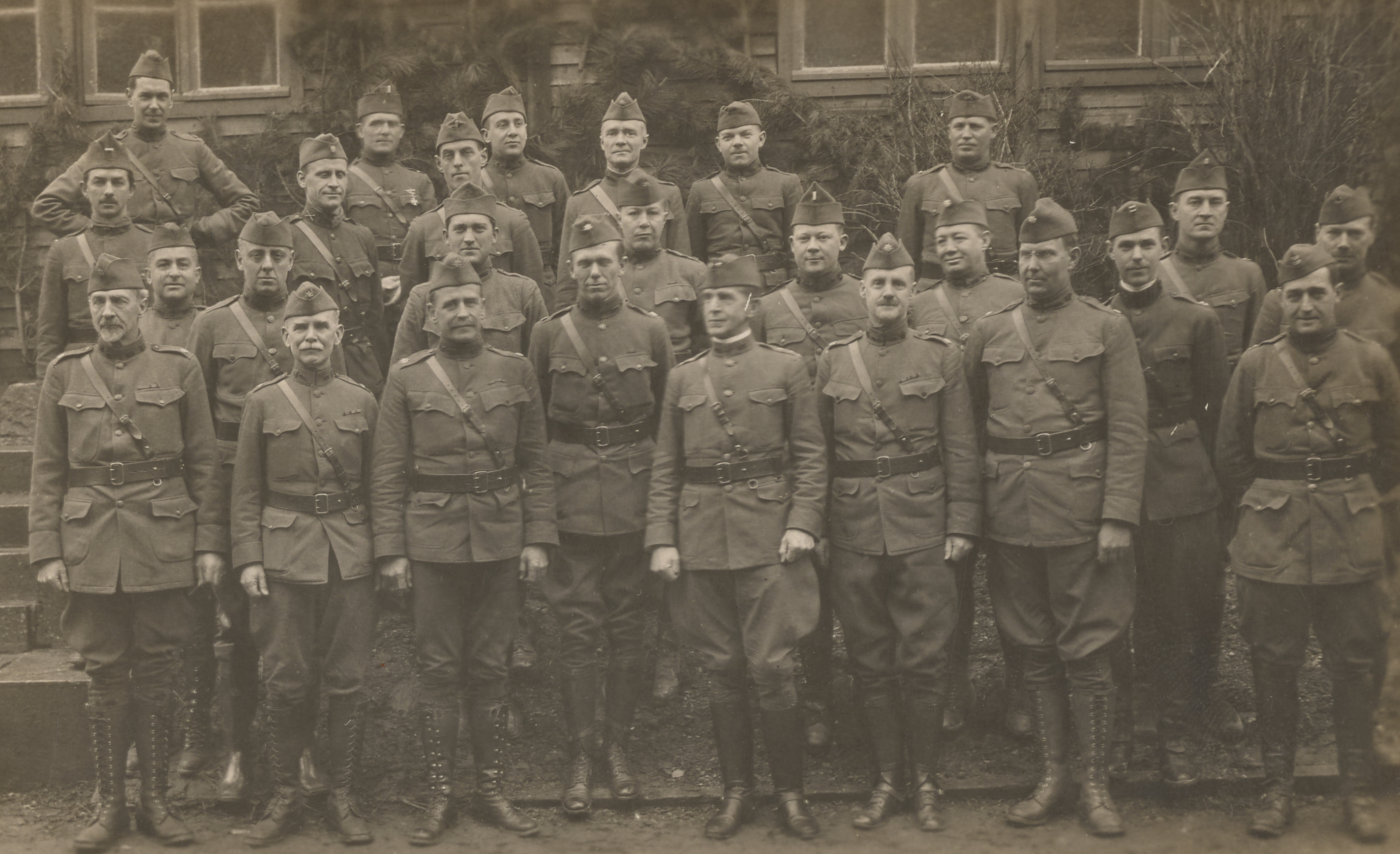
Major General Bullard (center, facing towards the right), the newly appointed commander of the 1st Division, and members of his divisional staff at Gondrecourt, France, January 17, 1918.

After the American entry into World War I, in April 1917, Bullard was quickly promoted to brigadier general (June 1917) and major general in the National Army (August 1917).

He took over command of the 1st Infantry Division ("Big Red One") from William L. Sibert, holding this post from December 1917 to July 1918. The division was then serving in France as part of the American Expeditionary Forces (AEF), commanded by General John J. Pershing.

He led his division in the Battle of Cantigny (May 28, 1918) and captured the village of Cantigny. It had been held by the German Eighteenth Army. It was the site of a German advance observation point and strongly fortified. This was the first sustained American offensive of the war. It was considered a success in that it expanded the American front by about a mile. General Pershing said of the attack:

The enemy reaction against our troops at Cantigny was extremely violent, and apparently he was determined at all costs to counteract the most excellent effect the American success had produced. For three days his guns of all calibers were concentrated on our new position and counter-attack succeeded counter-attack. The desperate efforts of the Germans gave the fighting at Cantigny a seeming tactical importance entirely out of proportion to the numbers involved."^{2}

Bullard was fluent in French and often served in joint U.S.–French operations. Due to the success of the Cantigny operation, Bullard was promoted and given command of the newly formed U.S. III Corps in July. His command was put under the French 10th Army and given command of the U.S. 1st and 2nd Division during the Aisne-Marne counter-offensive. Finding his new staff to be inadequate to the task of preparing a corps-level attack on short notice, Bullard made what historian John Eisenhower called a "sensible" and "courageous" (as it invited Pershing's wrath) decision to have the French 20th Corps exercise tactical control of the two U.S. divisions during the Battle of Soissons.

On August 1, his corps moved to the Vesle area near the Marne river where it assumed command of the U.S. 3rd Division, 28th Division, and 32nd Division. It was during this period that the 32nd and 28th Divisions fought the Battle of Fismes and Fismette (August 3-September 1, 1918), the only notable urban battle for the AEF during World War I. The town of Fismes changed hands five times during the battle. After the fighting concluded, Bullard felt compelled to send a memorandum to Pershing explaining a tragic incident in the battle's final days. Concerned about the exposed nature of the position north of the Vesle River in Fismette, Bullard had ordered the withdrawal of all forces south to Fismes. This order was countermanded by the French general commanding the 6th Army, an order that Bullard reluctantly obeyed. As a result, an entire company in the 28th Division was killed or captured. Bullard considered it "the only accident of my military career".

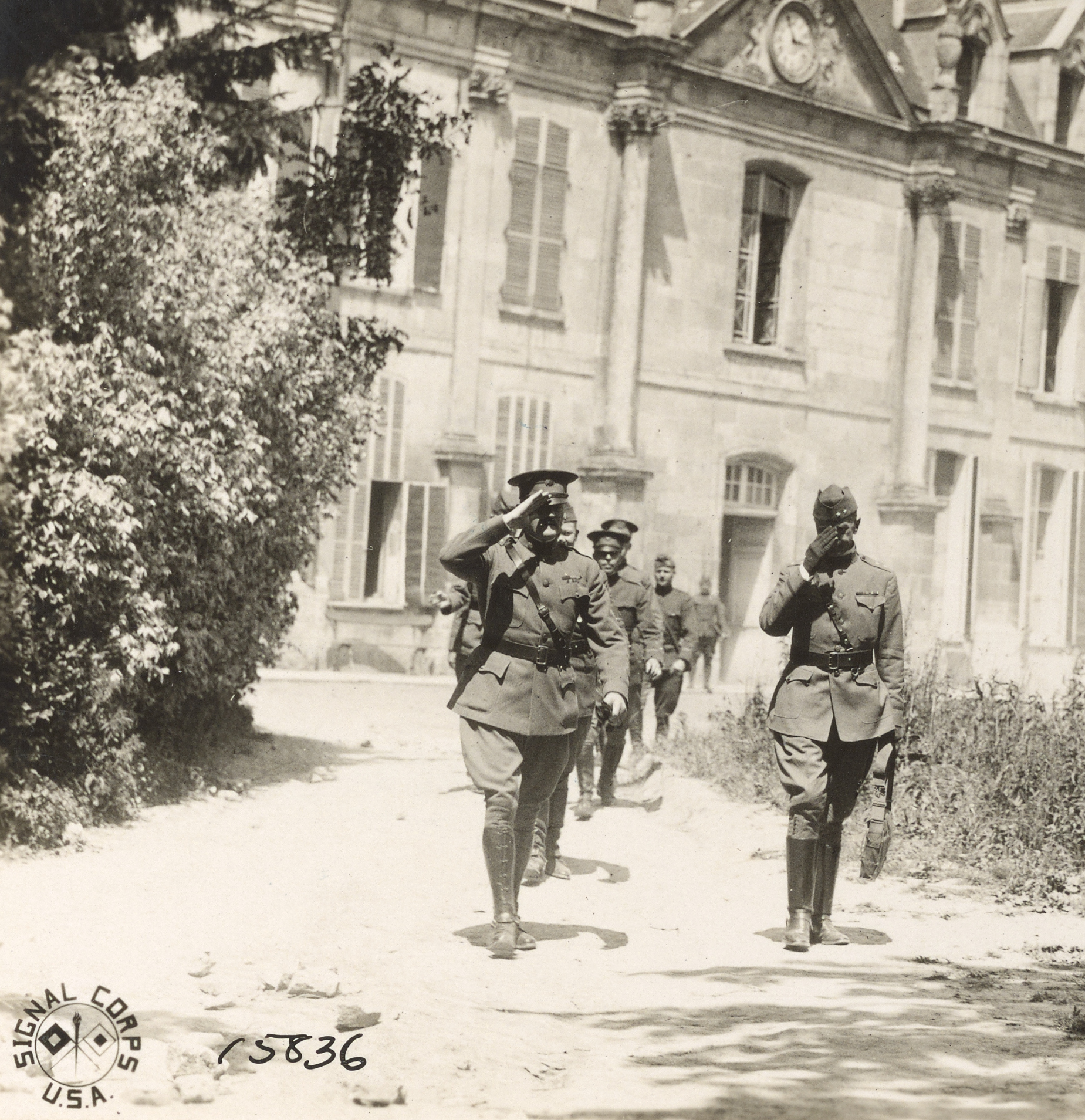
General John J. Pershing, Major General Robert Lee Bullard and members of Bullard's staff about to leave Chateau Tartigny to attend a review and decoration parade. Tartigny, France, June 30, 1918.

General Pershing created the Second U.S. Army on October 10 and appointed Bullard as its first commander with the temporary rank of lieutenant general. At the same time he turned over command of the U.S. First Army to Lieutenant General Hunter Liggett. Pershing retained his position as commander of the AEF with authority over both of the armies, becoming effectively an army group commander.

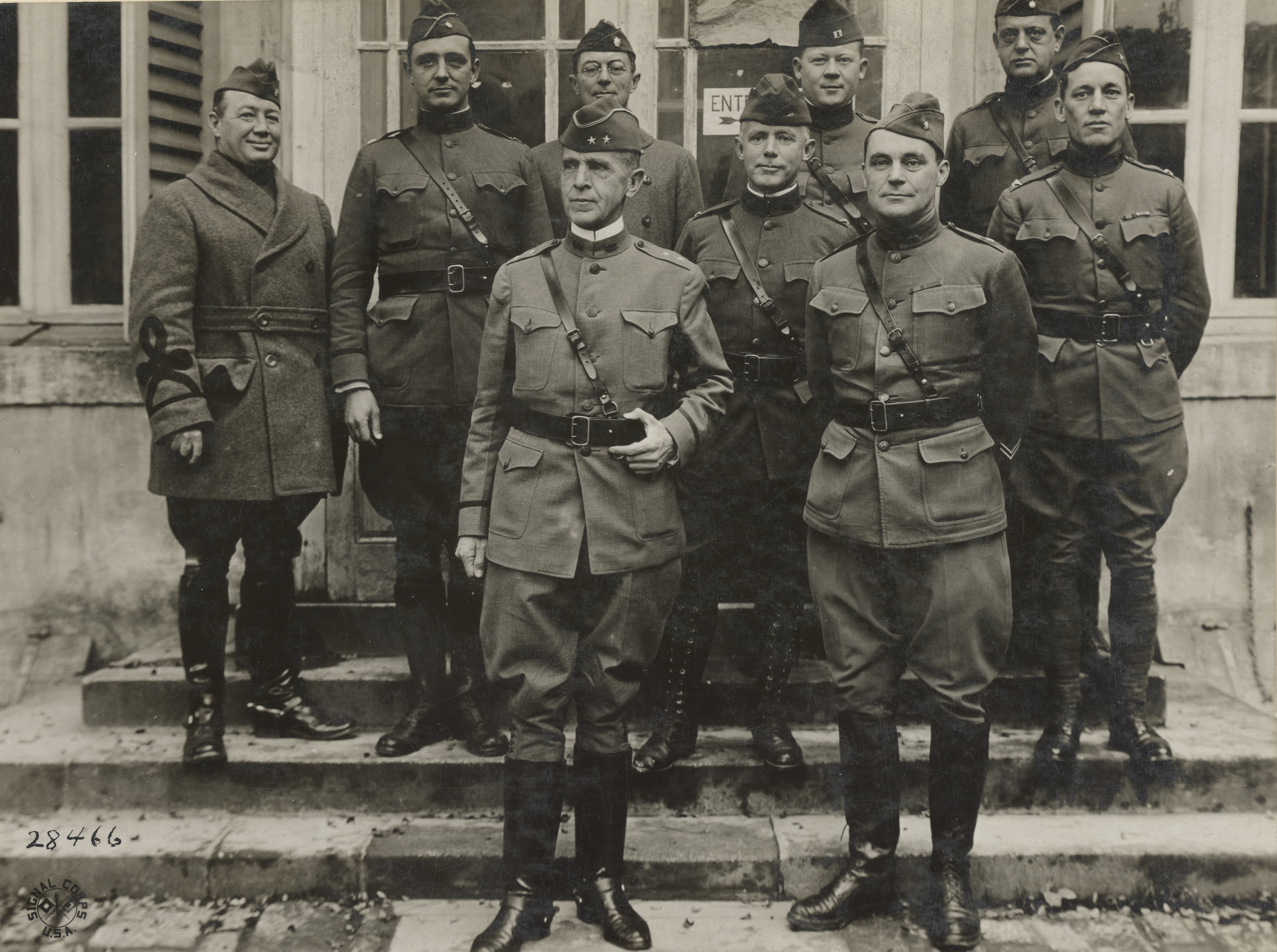
Major General Robert Lee Bullard, the newly appointed commander of the U.S. Second Army, pictured here with members of his staff at Second Army's headquarters at Toul, Meurthe-et-Moselle, France, October 20, 1918. On Bullard's left is his chief of staff, Brigadier General Stuart Heintzelman.

Bullard held a low opinion of Black American troops, writing in his diary that they were "hopelessly inferior." Historian Tyler E. Stovall described this view as part of a tradition of white U.S. military officers ascribing any failings on the part of African-American soldiers to "innate racial inadequacies".

Bullard's military actions have also been subject to criticism. In the Battle of Montfaucon, Bullard reportedly refused orders to turn the flank of the German troops with his 4th Division as he did not want to help Major General George H. Cameron, commander of V Corps, get credit for taking the German fortress at Montfaucon. Due to his alleged disobedience or deliberate misinterpretation of orders, the 79th Division, part of Cameron's V Corps, had no support to their right and suffered unnecessarily severe casualties as they performed a frontal attack on the fortress. Additionally, Bullard continued to conduct offensive operations, with full knowledge that the Armistice with Germany was due to take effect in a few hours, was criticized by Alden Brooks in his post-war account of the war, As I Saw It (1930).

For his services during the war Bullard was awarded the Army Distinguished Service Medal, the citation for which reads:

The President of the United States of America, authorized by Act of Congress, July 9, 1918, takes pleasure in presenting the Army Distinguished Service Medal to Lieutenant General Robert Lee Bullard, United States Army, for exceptionally meritorious and distinguished services to the Government of the United States, in a duty of great responsibility during World War I. In the course of this war, General Bullard commanded in turn the first American division to take its place in the front lines in France, the 3d Corps, and the Second Army. He participated in operations in reduction of the Marne salient and in the Meuse-Argonne offensive. He was in command of the Second Army when the German resistance west of the Meuse was shattered.

=== Post war ===
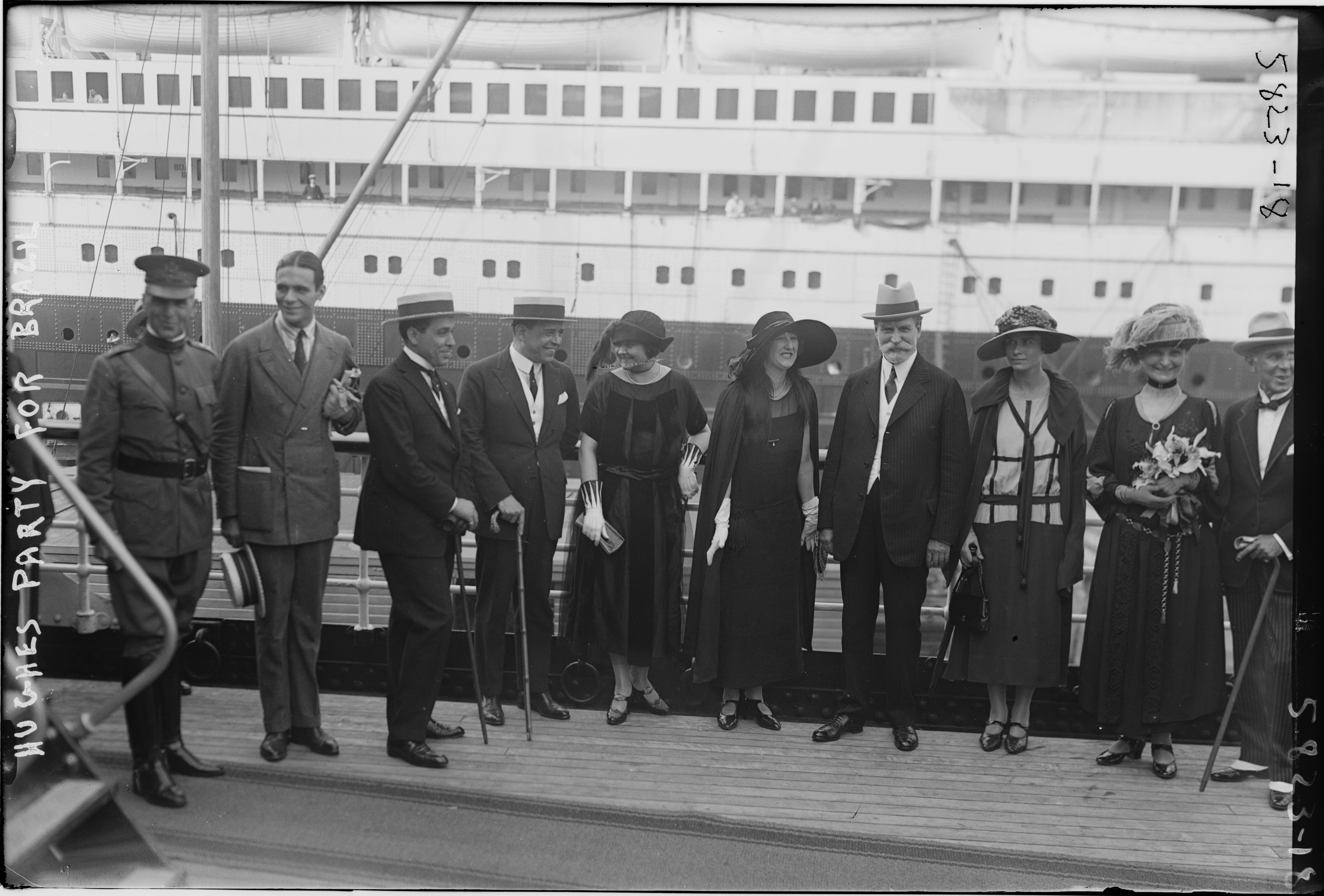
Bullard (far left) travels to Brazil with Secretary of State Charles Evans Hughes in August 1922.

The Second Army was deactivated in April 1919 and Bullard reverted to his permanent rank of major general in June 1920. He was assigned to corps command in the much smaller post war U.S. Army. He retired from active duty in 1925 to concentrate on writing. He served as last president of the National Security League from 1925 until he disbanded it in 1947.

Bullard wrote American Soldiers Also Fought in 1936.

He died on September 11, 1947, at the age of 86. Bullard is buried at the U.S. Military Academy Post Cemetery, with his wife Ella (Reiff) Bullard (5 November 1870 to 3 March 1963).

== Writing ==
He was author of the following books:

- Personalities and Reminiscences of the War, New York: Doubleday Page, 1925. ISBN 0-7661-9742-5
- American Soldiers also Fought, New York: Longmans, Green and Co., 1936. OCLC 2854191

Bullard also wrote several magazine articles.

== Military awards ==
- Army Distinguished Service Medal
- Indian Campaign Medal
- Spanish War Service Medal
- Philippine Campaign Medal
- Army of Cuban Pacification Medal
- Mexican Border Service Medal
- Victory Medal
- Commander, French Legion of Honor
- Commander, Belgian Order of Leopold
- Commander, Italian Order of Saints Maurice and Lazarus
- French Croix de Guerre with 2 palms

== Dates of rank ==
Insignia	Rank	Component	Date
None	Cadet	United States Military Academy	1 July 1881
None in 1885	Second Lieutenant	Regular Army	14 June 1885
	First Lieutenant	Regular Army	2 April 1892
	Captain	Regular Army	22 June 1898
	Colonel	Volunteers	6 August 1898 (Honorably discharged from Volunteers on 6 May 1901.)
	Major	Regular Army	1 April 1901
	Lieutenant Colonel	Regular Army	31 October 1906
	Colonel	Regular Army	11 March 1911
	Brigadier General	Regular Army	16 June 1917
	Major General	National Army	5 August 1917
	Lieutenant General	Emergency	1 November 1918 (Date of rank 16 October 1918. Discharged and reverted to permanent rank 30 June 1920.)
	Major General	Regular Army	16 February 1919 (Date of rank 27 November 1918.)
	Major General	Retired List	15 January 1925
	Lieutenant General	Retired List	21 June 1930

Source: Army Register, 1926

== Bibliography ==
- Millett, Allan R. (1975). The General: Robert L. Bullard and Officership in the United States Army, 1881–1925. Greenwood Press. ISBN 0837179572. OCLC 1530541.
- Davenport, Matthew J. (2015). First Over There: The Battle of Cantigny, America's First Battle of World War I. Thomas Dunne Books.
- Walker, William (2016). Betrayal at Little Gibraltar: A German Fortress, a Treacherous American General, and the Battle to End World War I. Scribner. ISBN 978-1-5011-1789-3.
- Davis, Henry Blaine Jr. (1998). Generals in Khaki. Raleigh, NC: Pentland Press. ISBN 1571970886. OCLC 40298151.
- Venzon, Anne Cipriano (2013). The United States in the First World War: an Encyclopedia. Hoboken, NJ: Taylor and Francis. ISBN 978-1-135-68453-2. OCLC 865332376.
- Zabecki, David T.; Mastriano, Douglas V., eds. (2020). Pershing's Lieutenants: American Military Leadership in World War I. New York, NY: Osprey Publishing. ISBN 978-1-4728-3863-6.

== Notes ==
^1 "Bullard, Robert Lee" . Encyclopædia Britannica (12th ed.). 1922.

^2 Source Records of the Great War, Vol. VI, ed. Charles F. Horne, National Alumni 1923

Military offices
Preceded by William L. Sibert	Commanding General 1st Division; 1917–1918	Succeeded by Charles P. Summerall
Preceded by Newly activated organization	Commanding General Second Army; 1918–1919	Succeeded by Post deactivated
