= Henry Pinckney McCain =

United States army officer (1861-1941)

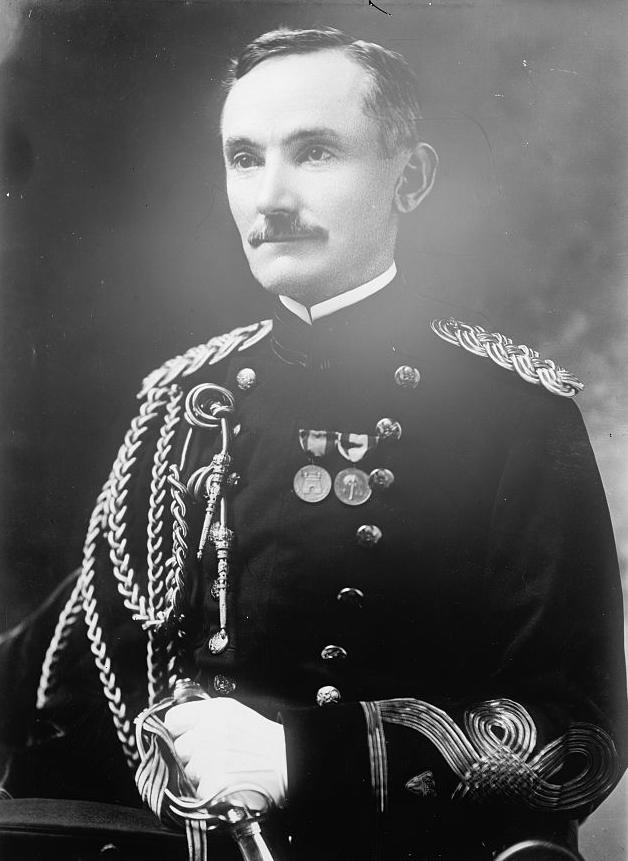
- Born: January 23, 1861; Carroll County, Mississippi
- Died: July 25, 1941 (aged 80); Washington, D.C., United States
- Burial place: Arlington National Cemetery, Virginia, United States
- Relatives: John S. McCain Sr. (nephew); William A. McCain (nephew)
- Military career
- Allegiance: United States
- Branch: United States Army
- Service years: 1885–1921
- Rank: Major General
- Service number: 0-9
- Unit: Infantry Branch
- Commands: Adjutant General of the United States Army; 12th Division
- Conflicts: Spanish–American War; Philippine-American War; World War I
- Awards: Army Distinguished Service Medal

Henry Pinckney McCain (January 23, 1861 – July 25, 1941) was an American military officer who was Adjutant General of the United States Army from 1914 to 1918. He held the rank of Major General.

== Early life ==
McCain was born in Carroll County, Mississippi, on January 23, 1861, the son of Mr. and Mrs. W. A. McCain. He was born during the brief period of time between Mississippi's secession from the United States and its joining the Confederate States of America shortly before the beginning of the American Civil War. McCain's relatives included William A. McCain (1878–1960) and John S. McCain Sr., who were his nephews.

He graduated, 20th in a class of 37, from the United States Military Academy (USMA) at West Point, New York, in June 1885. Among his classmates there included several men who would later rise to the rank of brigadier general or higher in their military careers, such as Joseph E. Kuhn, Charles H. Muir, John D. Barrette, Robert A. Brown, John M. Carson, Willard A. Holbrook, Robert Michie, Robert L. Bullard, Daniel B. Devore, Beaumont B. Buck, and William F. Martin. Upon graduating, he was commissioned a second lieutenant in the 3rd U.S. Infantry Regiment (The Old Guard) at Fort Shaw, Montana.

== Military career ==
From March 1889 to August 1891, he was Professor of Military Science and Tactics at Louisiana State University. He was promoted to first lieutenant in the 21st Infantry in February 1892, and transferred to the 14th Infantry in March, serving in the Department of the Columbia.

He was stationed in Alaska when the Spanish–American War broke out in April 1898. McCain sailed with his regiment to the Philippines in May, and was present for the Battle of Manila. He served as the acting assistant adjutant general for U.S. forces in the Philippines, but had to return to the United States in September due to illness. He held various staff positions in the Department of the Columbia and was promoted to captain in March 1899.

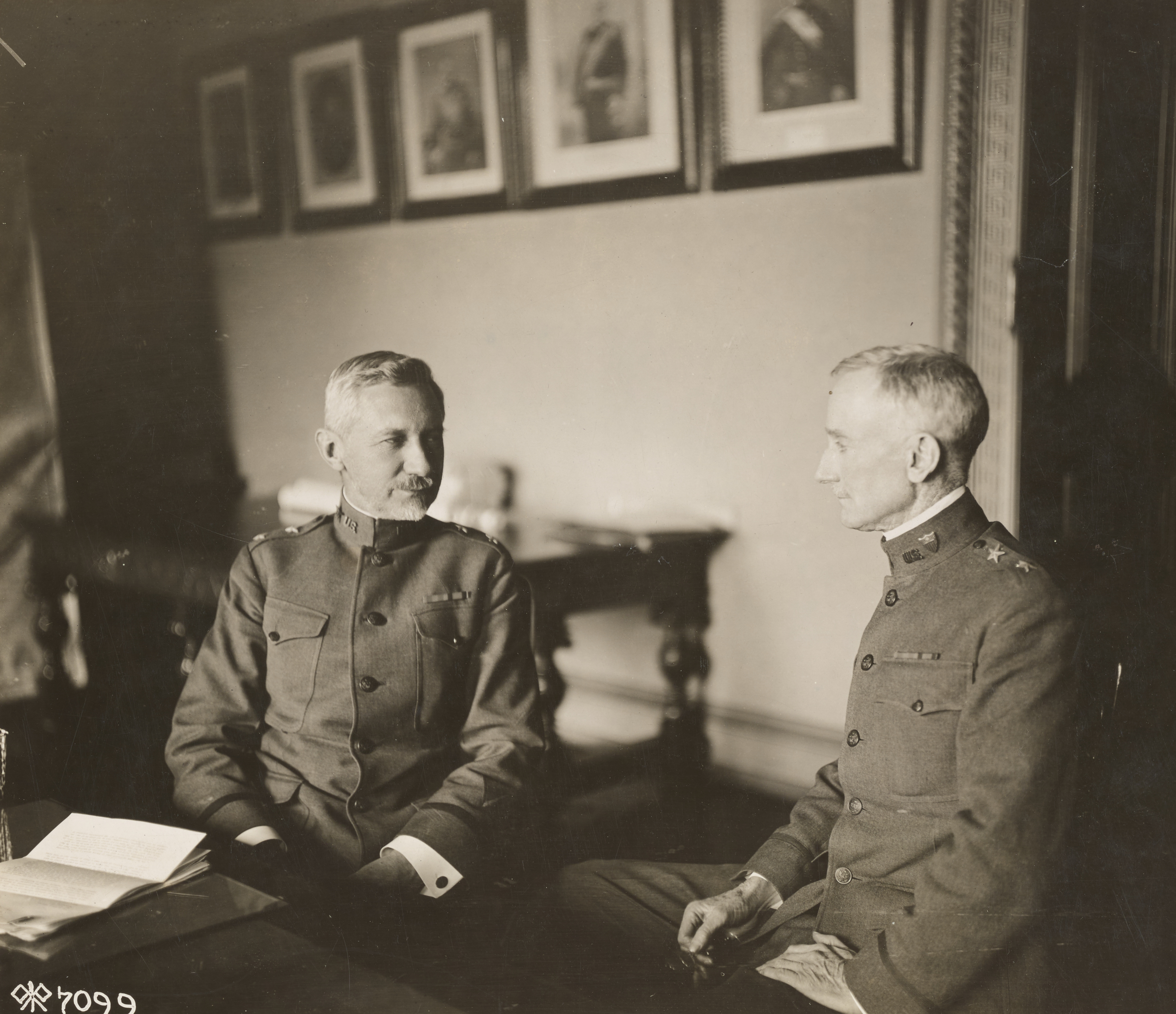
Major General Peyton C. March, soon to be promoted to be Army Chief of Staff, and Major General Henry P. McCain, March 28, 1918.

In November 1900, McCain was promoted to major and transferred to the Adjutant General's Office in Washington, D.C. He was promoted again to lieutenant colonel in January 1901. In August 1903, he was assigned as chief of staff for the Department of Mindanao in the Philippines. In March 1904 he returned to the United States as chief of staff for the Southwestern Division. And in April 1904 he was promoted to colonel and returned to the Adjutant General's Office in Washington, where he served until the autumn of 1912.

Following a stint as adjutant general of the Philippines Division from 1912 to 1914, McCain was promoted to brigadier general and elevated to Adjutant General of the United States Army. In October 1917, six months after the American entry into World War I, he was promoted to major general. In August 1918 he was given command of the 12th Division at Camp Devens, Massachusetts, ultimately intended for service on the Western Front. However, the Armistice with Germany on November 11, 1918, brought an end to hostilities and, as a result, McCain's division was demobilized in January 1919 without having gone overseas. McCain continued to command Camp Devens to July 1920.

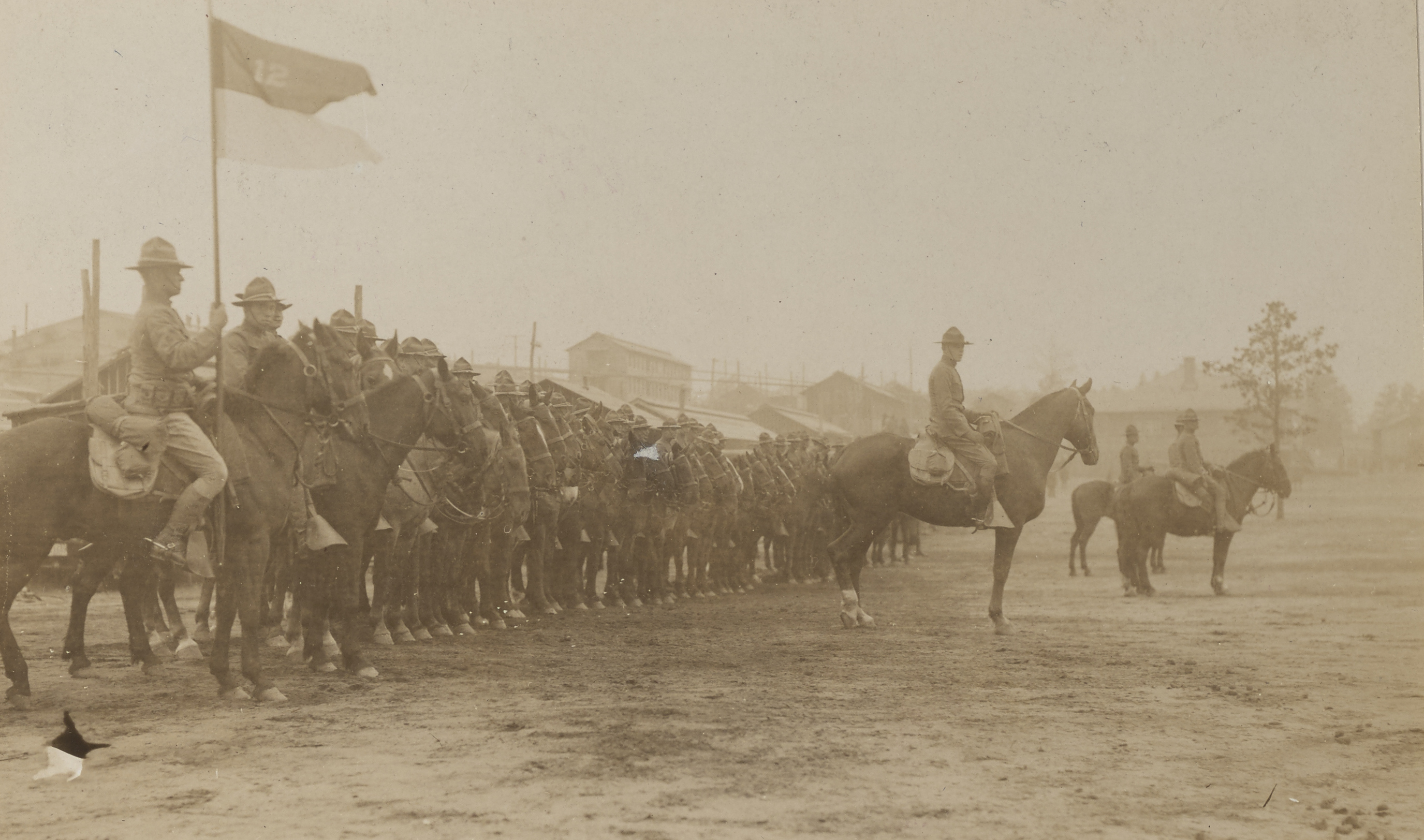
Major General McCain reviewing the 12th Division.

In June 1920, McCain reverted to his permanent peacetime rank of colonel and served as adjutant of the Sixth Corps Area until his retirement in July 1921. He served as governor of the United States Soldiers' Home in Washington, D.C. from May 1927 to April 1936. He died in Washington on July 25, 1941, shortly before the United States was to enter World War II, and is buried in Arlington National Cemetery.

== Awards and honors ==
He received the Army Distinguished Service Medal for his services in administering the Adjutant General's Department during World War I. The citation for the medal reads:

The President of the United States of America, authorized by Act of Congress, July 9, 1918, takes pleasure in presenting the Army Distinguished Service Medal to Major General Henry Pinckney McCain, United States Army, for exceptionally meritorious and distinguished services to the Government of the United States, in a duty of great responsibility during World War I. In administering the Adjutant General's Department during the early period of the war, through his efficient management this department was able to meet the excessive burdens placed upon it.

He also received the following service medal during his long military career:

- Spanish Campaign Medal
- Philippine Campaign Medal
- World War I Victory Medal

== Legacy ==
Camp McCain, an Army mobilization site near Grenada, Mississippi, was established in 1942 and named for General McCain. It was later used as a Mississippi Army National Guard training facility.

== Personal life ==
He married Emiline DeMoss on November 14, 1888.

== See also ==
- List of Adjutants General of the U.S. Army
- List of major generals in the United States Regular Army before July 1, 1920
- McCain family heritage

== Bibliography ==
- Robinson, William J. (1920). Forging the Sword: The Story of Camp Devens, New England's Army Cantonment. Concord, New Hampshire: Rumford Press.

Military offices
Preceded by George Andrews	Adjutant General of the United States Army; 1914−1918	Succeeded by Peter C. Harris
Preceded by Newly activated organization	Commanding General 12th Division; 1918−1919	Succeeded by Post deactivated
