= Joseph E. Kuhn =

United States Army general (1864–1935)

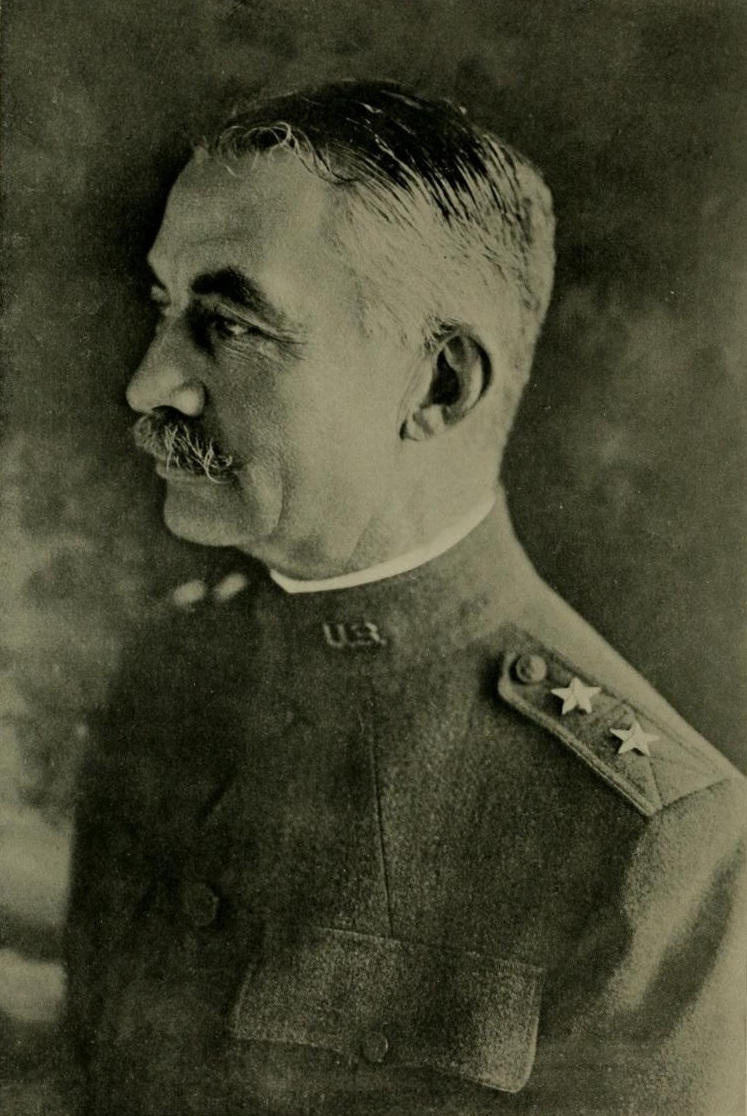
- From 1922's History of the Seventy-Ninth division, A. E. F. During the World War: 1917–1919.
- Born: June 14, 1864; Leavenworth, Kansas, US
- Died: November 12, 1935 (aged 71); San Diego, California, US
- Burial place: Arlington National Cemetery
- Spouse(s): Caroline Waugh Parker (d. 1916); Helen Squire (d. 1931)
- Children: 2
- Military career
- Allegiance: United States
- Branch: United States Army
- Service years: 1885–1925
- Rank: Major General
- Service number: 0-42
- Unit: United States Army Corps of Engineers
- Commands: 3rd Engineer Battalion; United States Army Engineer School; United States Army War College; 79th Division; IX Corps; Camp Kearny, California; Schofield Barracks, Hawaii and 21st Infantry Brigade; Vancouver Barracks, Washington and 5th Infantry Brigade
- Conflicts: Spanish–American War; Russo-Japanese War; World War I
- Awards: Army Distinguished Service Medal; Legion of Honor (Officer); Croix de Guerre
- Other work: Consulting engineer

Joseph E. Kuhn (June 14, 1864 – November 12, 1935) was a career officer in the United States Army. He attained the rank of major general, and was most notable for his command of the 79th Division during World War I, and his post-war commands of IX Corps, Schofield Barracks, and Vancouver Barracks.

A native of Leavenworth, Kansas, Kuhn graduated at the top of his United States Military Academy (USMA) class of 1885; assigned to the Engineers, he carried out rivers and harbors construction and maintenance assignments in Detroit and San Francisco. He also served on the USMA faculty, and planned and oversaw construction of several buildings at the academy. During the Spanish–American War, he served as assistant to the Chief of Engineers, a role which included supervising Engineer projects related to the coastal defenses of the United States.

Kuhn's later career included serving as an observer of Japan's army during the Russo-Japanese War, and Germany's at the start of World War I. During the war, Kuhn commanded the 79th Division, and then the IX Corps. His post-war commands included the Camp Kearny demobilization center in California, Schofield Barracks and the 21st Infantry Brigade in Hawaii, and Vancouver Barracks and the 5th Infantry Brigade in Washington.

Kuhn retired in 1925, and resided in San Diego, where he worked as a consulting engineer and became involved in civic causes and charities. He died in San Diego and was buried at Arlington National Cemetery.

== Early life ==
Joseph Ernst Kuhn was born in Leavenworth, Kansas on June 14, 1864; his parents, Gottlieb Victor Kuhn and Anna Maria Kempel, were natives of Germany. Kuhn was educated in the public schools of Leavenworth, and graduated from Leavenworth High School in 1881.

After high school, Kuhn was appointed to the United States Military Academy; he graduated first of 39 in the West Point class of 1885. The top graduates at West Point were usually assigned to the Engineer branch, and in line with that custom, Kuhn was commissioned as a second lieutenant of Engineers. His classmates included Willard A. Holbrook, Robert A. Brown, Robert Michie, Daniel B. Devore, Henry P. McCain, Beaumont B. Buck, Charles H. Muir, John D. Barrette, John M. Carson Jr., William F. Martin, George W. Burr and Robert Lee Bullard. All of these men would, like Kuhn himself, attain the rank of general officer

== Start of military career ==
Kuhn served initially with an engineer company and then on the staff of the Engineer School, both at Willets Point, New York. In 1888, he was assigned to the Detroit Engineer District as assistant district engineer, which included supervision of river and harbor projects on the east shore of Lake Michigan. He was promoted to first lieutenant in 1889, and assigned as an instructor on the West Point faculty, where he taught civil and military engineering until 1894. While at West Point, Kuhn also planned and oversaw construction of several new academic buildings. From 1894 to 1896, Kuhn was assistant district engineer of the San Francisco Engineer District.

Kuhn was promoted to captain in 1896, and from 1896 to 1900 he served as assistant to the Army's Chief of Engineers, which included oversight of personnel management for the Engineer branch, as well as supervision of planning for Engineer branch programs and projects connected with the Spanish–American War coastal defense of the United States. During the war he held the temporary rank of major, and he reverted to his permanent rank of captain in September 1899.

From 1900 to 1903, Kuhn commanded the Engineer company based at West Point and served on the faculty as head of the Department of Practical Military Engineering. From August 1903 to March 1904, Kuhn commanded the 3rd Engineer Battalion in the Philippines. From March 1904 to November 1905, Kuhn served as a military observer of the Imperial Japanese Army, as one of the military attachés and observers in the Russo-Japanese War; he was promoted to permanent major in April 1904, and from December 1905 to June 1906, Kuhn was assigned to the staff of the War Department, where he compiled and published the report of his findings.

From June to September 1906, Kuhn observed the German Army during a major training exercise; his German heritage and fluency in the German and French languages helped him form a personal relationship with the Kaiser, which enabled Kuhn to make detailed observations on Germany's military, which he compiled and published upon his return to the United States. From 1906 to 1909, Kuhn was district engineer for the Norfolk Engineer District; in addition to supervision of construction and maintenance on river and harbor projects in the Norfolk area, Kuhn also had charge of the harbor defenses in and around Norfolk.

== Later career ==
Kuhn was promoted to lieutenant colonel in September 1909, and assigned as senior engineering instructor at the Army Service Schools; located at Fort Leavenworth, the service schools were the predecessor of the United States Army Command and General Staff College. From August 1912 to August 1913, Kuhn was the district engineer for the Philadelphia Engineer District, with responsibility for river and harbor projects, as well as Philadelphia's harbor defenses.

From September 1913 to December 1914, Kuhn served at Washington Barracks as commander of the 3rd Engineer Battalion, the Engineer Depot, and the Engineer School. From December 1914 to March 1915, he was a military observer in Germany, responsible for reviewing and compiling reports on the German Army during the early stages of World War I, while the United States was neutral. He was promoted to colonel in March 1915, and assigned as military attaché at the American embassy in Berlin. Kuhn became less effective as it became apparent to the German government that the United States would enter the war on the side of the Allies, and he returned to the United States in December 1916.

== World War I ==
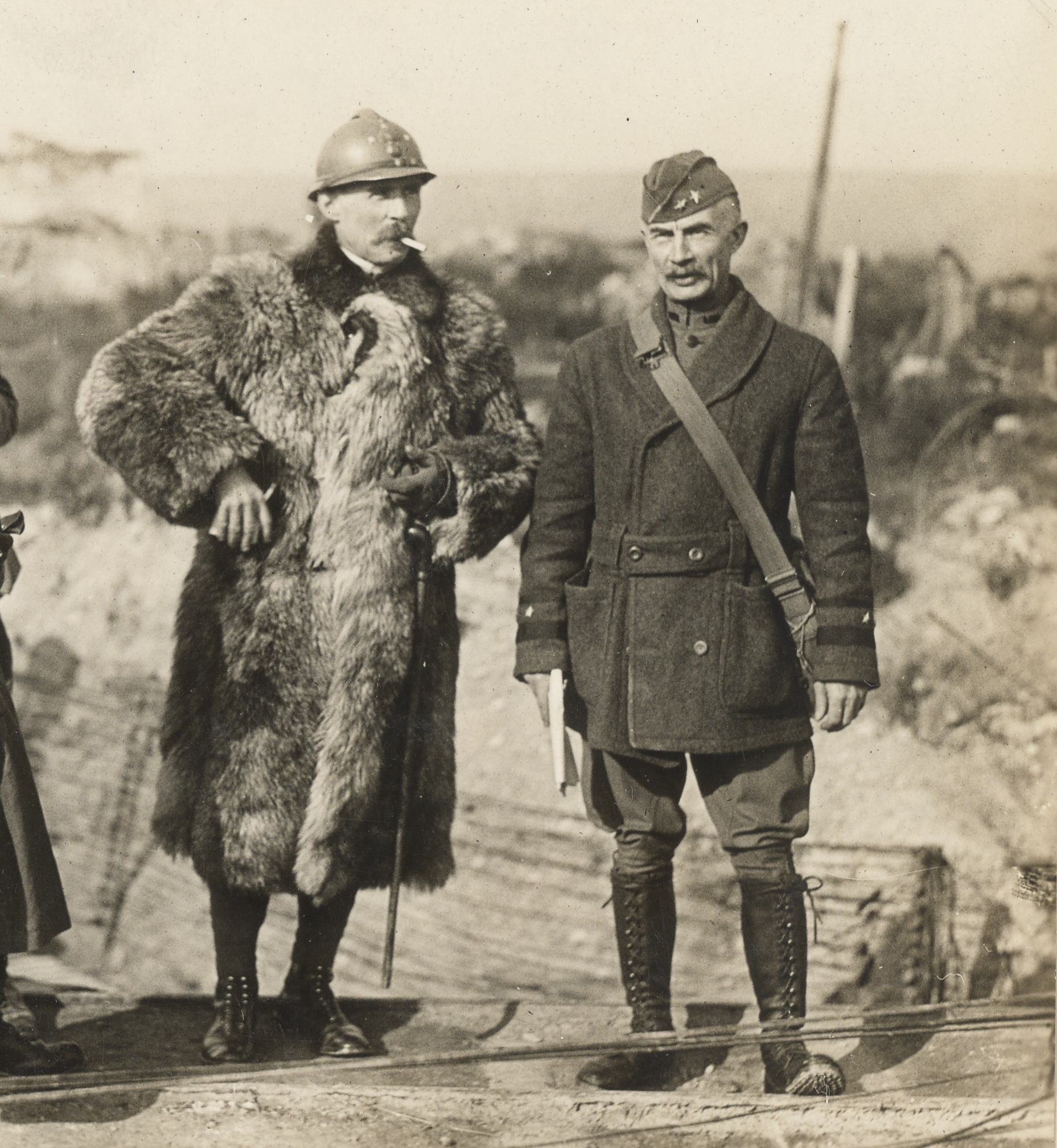
Major General Kuhn (right) conferring with General Henri Claudel, commanding the French 17th Army Corps, during the Meuse-Argonne Offensive near Vacherauville, October 31, 1918.

In January 1917, Kuhn was promoted to brigadier general and assigned as president of the United States Army War College. In addition to preparing field grade officers to exercise command and staff responsibilities at the division and corps level during the war, Kuhn also had a role in designing the brigades and divisions the Army would field for the war, as well as preparation of initial mobilization and training plans.

In August 1917, four months after the American entry into World War I, Kuhn was promoted to temporary major general and assigned to command of the newly formed 79th Division. In late 1917, Tasker H. Bliss, then serving as army chief of staff, was assigned as the U.S. representative to the Supreme War Council; Kuhn was among those considered to succeed Bliss. Kuhn made known his preference for a combat command, and remained in charge of the 79th Division, while Peyton C. March was selected for the chief of staff position.

Kuhn commanded the 79th Division during its organization and training at Fort Meade, Maryland until July 1918, when the unit embarked for France. He then led the division during its combat in the Meuse-Argonne Offensive, including the capture of Montfaucon.

After the war, he commanded the IX Corps from February to March 1919, after which he returned to command of the 79th Division so he could lead it on its return to the United States. The 79th Division was demobilized at Fort Dix, New Jersey and Fort Meade in May and June, 1919.

== Post-World War I ==
After the war, Kuhn returned to the permanent rank of brigadier general, and commanded the Camp Kearny, California demobilization center from July 1919 to September 1920. From September 1920 to September 1923, he commanded Schofield Barracks, Hawaii and the 21st Infantry Brigade. While in Hawaii, he also organized the Hawaiian Division and planned for its initial employment. From October 1923 to July 1925, Kuhn commanded Vancouver Barracks, Washington and the 5th Infantry Brigade. He was promoted to permanent major general in July 1925, and retired in August.

== Retirement and death ==
In retirement, Kuhn was a resident of San Diego, and worked as a technical advisor for Copley Press and as a consulting engineer. He was also involved in civic and charitable causes, including chairman of the board for the San Diego Chapter of the American Red Cross. Kuhn authored his wartime memoirs, which were serialized in The Washington Post in March 1926. He died in San Diego on November 12, 1935, at the age of 71, and was buried at Arlington National Cemetery.

== Awards ==
For his World War I service, Kuhn was a recipient of the Army Distinguished Service Medal, and the French Croix de Guerre and Legion of Honor (Officer).

== Legacy ==
Kuhn Road, which runs between 18th and 21st Streets at Fort Belvoir, Virginia is named for him. Fort Belvoir was previously the location of the Army's Engineer Center and School, and several streets and buildings there are named for prominent Engineer officers.

== Family ==
In 1893, Kuhn married Caroline Waugh Parker, the daughter of Major Richard C. Parker and sister of Colonel James Southard Parker. Caroline Kuhn died in 1916, and in 1917 Kuhn married Helen H. Squire, who died in 1931.

Joseph and Caroline Kuhn were the parents of two sons; Joseph Southard Kuhn was nine years old when he died in 1911. Richard Parker Kuhn (1894–1963), known as Parker, was a veteran of World War I and World War II, and pursued a successful business career between the wars. During the second world war, Parker Kuhn was assigned to the staff at the headquarters of the Army Service Forces, and attained the rank of colonel. Parker Kuhn also received the Legion of Merit for his World War II service.

== Sources ==
=== Books ===
- Barber, J. Frank (1922). History of the Seventy-Ninth Division, A. E. F. During the World War: 1917–1919. Lancaster, PA: Steinman & Steinman.
- Davis, Henry Blaine Jr. (1998). Generals in Khaki. Raleigh, NC: Pentland Press. ISBN 978-1-57197-088-6.
- Fax, Gene (2017). With Their Bare Hands: General Pershing, the 79th Division, and the Battle for Montfaucon. New York, NY: Osprey Publishing. ISBN 978-1-4728-1923-9.
- Gore, James Howard (1920). American Legionnaires of France. Washington, DC: W. F. Roberts.
- U.S. Army Engineer Center and School (1985). Real Property, U.S. Army Engineer Center. Fort Belvoir, VA: U.S. Army Engineer Center.

=== Newspapers ===
- "Commencement: Interesting Experiences Last Night; The Class of '81 Appears Before Their Friends in the Last Scenes of Their Scholastic Course". Leavenworth Times. Leavenworth, KS. June 19, 1881.
- "The Week in Washington: Lieut. J. E. Kuhn, Engineer Corps, U.S. Army, and Miss Caroline Parker Were Married Today". National Tribune. Washington, DC. March 9, 1893.
- "Stricken with Apoplexy at Social Event; Mrs. Joseph E. Kuhn Dies at Garrison Home Within Three Hours of Attack". Washington Times. Washington, DC. February 10, 1916.
- "Famed Army Engineer Expires at San Diego". Los Angeles Times. Los Angeles, CA. November 13, 1935.
- "Commander of 79th Dead". Mount Carmel Item. Mount Carmel, PA. November 14, 1935.
- "Maj. Gen. Joseph E. Kuhn Dies in California". Pottstown Mercury. Pottstown, PA. November 14, 1935.

=== Internet ===
- Thayer, Bill. "Joseph Ernst Kuhn: Compilation of Entries in Cullum's Register, Volumes III to VIII". penelope.uchicago.edu/. Bill Thayer.
- "Obituary, Rickard Parker Kuhn, 1916". apps.westpointaog.org/. West Point, NY: West Point Association of Graduates. 1963. Archived from the original on 2017-04-15.

=== Magazines ===
- Jenks, J. E. (March 13, 1911). "Death Notice: Joseph Southard Kuhn". Army and Navy Register. Washington, DC: Army and Navy Publishing Company.

Military offices
Preceded by Montgomery M. Macomb	Commandant of the United States Army War College; January–August 1917	Succeeded by College closed for World War I
Preceded by Newly activated organization	Commanding General 79th Division; 1917–1919	Succeeded by Inactivated
