= Beaumont B. Buck =

United States Army general (1860–1950)

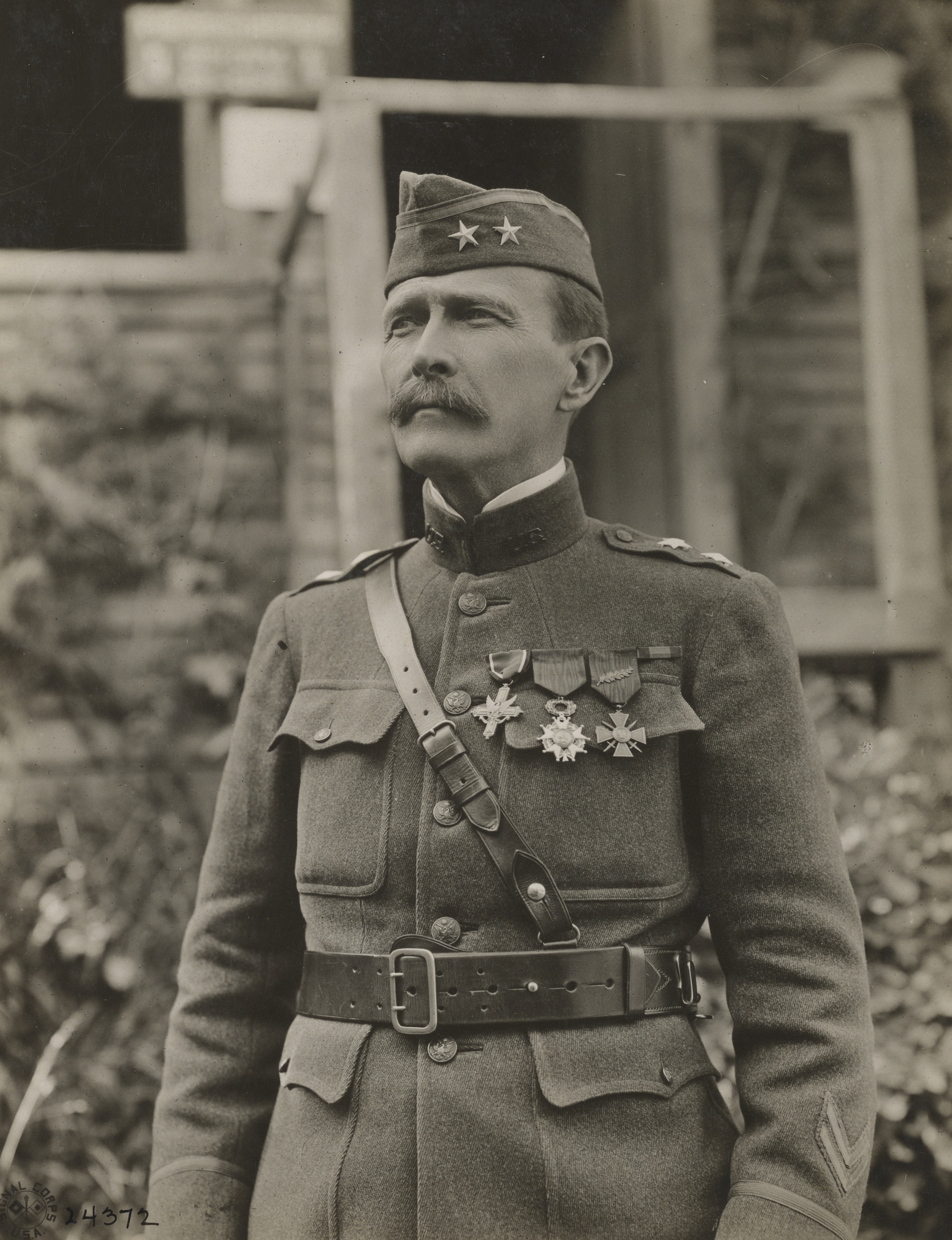
- Born: January 16, 1860; Mayhew, Mississippi, United States
- Died: February 10, 1950 (aged 90); San Antonio, Texas, United States
- Burial place: Fort Sam Houston National Cemetery, Texas, United States
- Military career
- Allegiance: United States
- Branch: United States Army
- Service years: 1885–1924; 1925–1932
- Rank: Major General
- Service number: 0-151
- Unit: Infantry Branch
- Commands: 13th Regiment (Acting); 28th Regiment; 2nd Infantry Brigade; 3rd Division; 34th Division; Camp MacArthur; Camp Meade; 20th Regiment
- Conflicts: Spanish–American War; Philippine–American War; World War I
- Awards: Distinguished Service Cross; Croix de Guerre; War Merit Cross

Major General Beaumont Bonaparte Buck (January 16, 1860 – February 10, 1950) was a United States Army officer who served in the Spanish–American War, the Philippine–American War, and World War I. He is best known for his service with the 1st Division during World War I, where he commanded a regiment, brigade and division.

== Early life ==
Beaumont Bonaparte Buck was born on January 16, 1860, in Mayhew, Mississippi, to James and Martha Garner Buck. He entered the United States Military Academy (USMA) at West Point, New York, from where he graduated thirty of thirty-nine with the class of 1885. Among his classmates included several men who would later rise to the rank of brigadier general or higher in their military careers, such as Joseph E. Kuhn, Charles H. Muir, John D. Barrette, Robert A. Brown, John M. Carson, Willard A. Holbrook, Henry P. McCain, Robert Michie, Robert L. Bullard, Daniel B. Devore, and William F. Martin.

== Military career ==
After graduation, Buck was commissioned as a second lieutenant in the United States Army Infantry Branch. His first assignment was with the 16th Infantry Regiment and served on frontier duty from 1885 to 1889. In August 1889, Buck became professor of military science and tactics at the University of Missouri, a position he held until 1892.

After completing a brief tour of duty with the 16th Infantry at Fort Douglas, Utah, he served as commandant of cadets at Baylor University from December 1893 to May 1895.

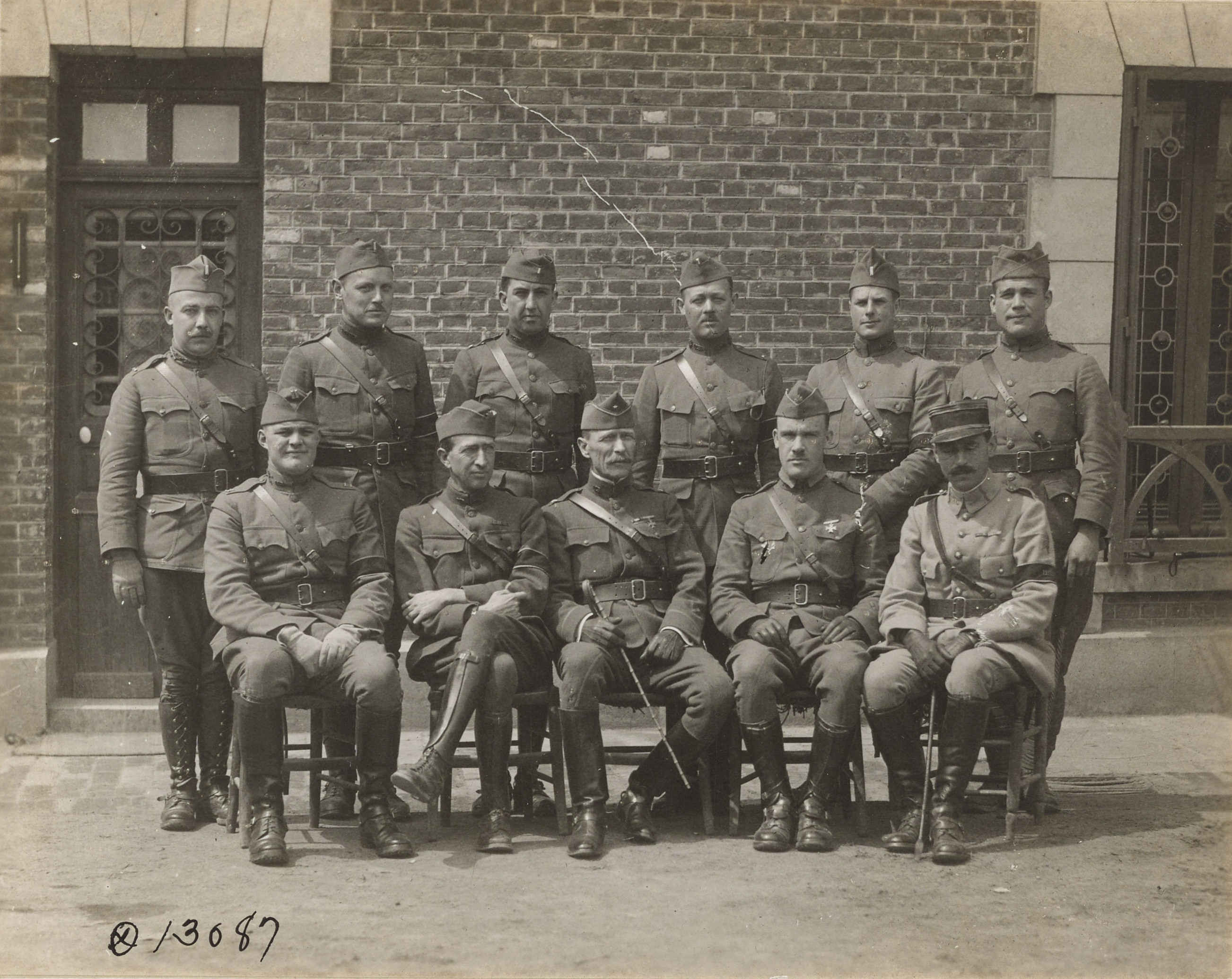
Brigadier General Buck (front row, centre), commanding the 2nd Brigade, 1st Division, pictured here with members of his brigade staff in Froissy, France, May 1918.

Upon the outbreak of the Spanish–American War in 1898, Buck entered the Second Texas Volunteer Infantry as a major and was honorably mustered out of the unit at the end of the war. On March 1, 1899, Buck was promoted to captain.

During the following years, he completed three separate tours of duty in the Philippines during the Philippine–American War and married his wife Susanne Long on December 30, 1908. In 1909, Buck graduated from the United States Army War College. He then served on the faculty of the Army War College from November 1909 to June 1910.

After duty at Vancouver Barracks, Washington until March 1911, Buck served as assistant adjutant general of the Philippine Division in Manila until July 1912. He was acting commander of the 13th Infantry Regiment from 1912 into 1913 during a series of field training exercises in the Philippines. In April 1914, Buck was promoted to lieutenant colonel. He subsequently joined the Massachusetts National Guard as an inspector-instructor from December 1914 to June 1917 preparing guardsmen for deployment to the US-Mexican border. In July 1916, Buck was promoted to the rank of colonel.

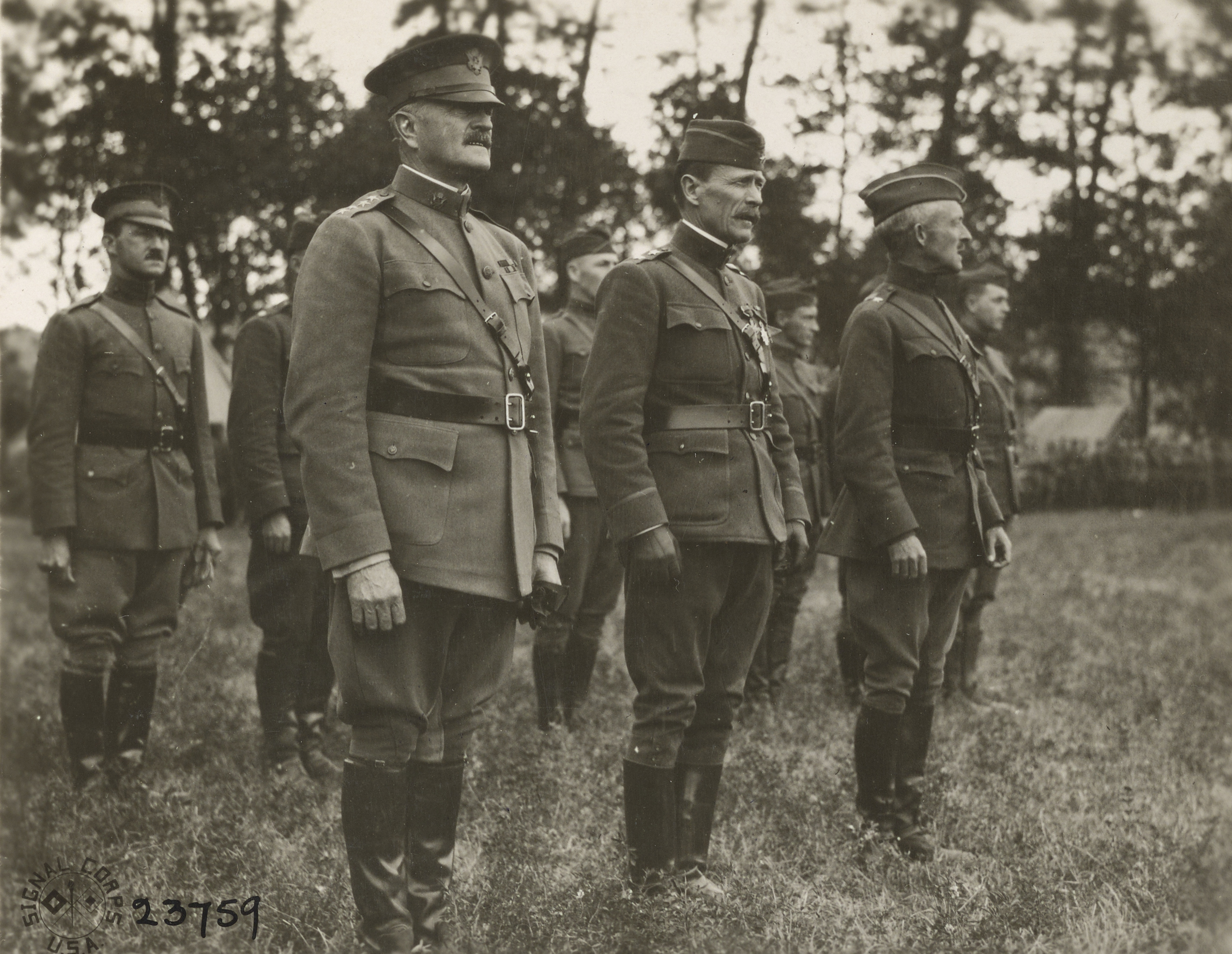
General John J. Pershing, Major General Beaumont B. Buck, and Brigadier General Fred W. Sladen inspecting the Guard of Honor of the 3rd Battalion, 7th Infantry Regiment, 3rd Division, Vaucouleurs, France, 1918.

On June 12, 1917, just over two months after the American entry into World War I, Buck became the commanding officer (CO) of the 28th Infantry Regiment which, together with the 26th Infantry Regiment and the 3rd Machine Gun Battalion, formed part of the 2nd Brigade, itself part of the newly created 1st Division under Major General William L. Sibert, which was soon sent to France as part of the first contingent of the American Expeditionary Forces (AEF). Buck was promoted to the rank of brigadier general on August 5 and succeeded Robert Lee Bullard, a West Point classmate of 1885, in command of the 2nd Brigade. Buck went on to lead the brigade during the battles of Cantigny and Soissons in the spring and summer of 1918. Buck was awarded the Distinguished Service Cross (DSC) for his role in the capture of Berzy-le-Sec during the battle of Soissons. The citation for his DSC reads:

The President of the United States of America, authorized by Act of Congress, July 9, 1918, takes pleasure in presenting the Distinguished Service Cross to Brigadier General Beaumont Bonaparte Buck, United States Army, for extraordinary heroism in action while serving as Commanding General, 2d Infantry Brigade, 1st Division, A.E.F., before and during the attack of Berzy-le-Sec, France, 21 July 1918. Brigadier General Buck displayed conspicuous gallantry and heroic leadership of his command. When most of the officers of his brigade had fallen, General Buck, with contempt of personal danger, in spite of heavy artillery bombardment and machine-gun fire, traversed the front of his advancing forces, gave correct directions to his organization commanders and led the first wave of the culminating attack which stormed and captured the town."

Buck was rewarded for his performance by receiving a promotion to the rank of major general on August 8, 1918, and went on to succeed Major General Joseph T. Dickman in command of the 3rd Division, while Brigadier General Frank E. Bamford took over command of Buck's old 2nd Brigade. Under Buck's command, the 3rd Division fought in the Battle of Saint-Mihiel in mid-September, and then the next month in the Meuse–Argonne offensive, where Buck apparently did not perform well and was relieved of his command by General John J. Pershing, commander-in-chief (C-in-C) of the AEF. On October 15, at the height of the battle, Pershing visited Buck's 3rd Division headquarters, then at Montfaucon, where "he found the troops mixed, disorganized, and apparently disheartened" and, concluding that Buck was not up to the job of commanding a division (despite having performed very well in command of a regiment and a brigade), made the decision to replace him. Buck was not the only commander to be relieved during the battle, however, as Pershing also relieved Major General John E. McMahon, commanding the 5th Division, and Clarence R. Edwards, commanding the 26th Division, in the same month, for similar reasons. Buck's replacement went to a much younger man, Brigadier General Preston Brown, who replaced him on October 18.

After this, Buck, very briefly, in late October assumed command of the 34th Division, which had only recently arrived in France but had been skeletonized and stripped of most of its personnel to provide replacements for other divisions in the AEF. The armistice with Germany occurred soon afterwards, on November 11, 1918, bringing the war to an end. For his services in the war, Buck was made a commander of the Legion of Honour by France and awarded the War Merit Cross by Italy.

Buck returned to the United States on November 15, where he took command of Camp MacArthur in December and Camp Meade in March 1919. On May 15, he was reduced in rank to his permanent rank of colonel.

From then until March 1920, he was assigned to the Mexican–American Border near Laredo, Texas, later transferring to Fort Crook in April 1920 to take command the 20th Infantry Regiment. The regiment moved to Camp Travis (now part of Fort Sam Houston) in October 1920. His final assignment was as acting chief of staff of the 90th Division, part of the organized reserves, at Camp Travis, beginning August 15, 1921.

== In retirement ==
Having reached the mandatory retirement age of 64, Buck retired from military service as a colonel on January 16, 1924, settling in San Antonio, Texas. He returned to active duty from June 1925 to August 1932 as a recruiting officer in San Antonio. His full rank was restored by Congress in June 1930, and he published a memoir, entitled Memories of Peace and War, in 1935.

== Death and legacy ==
Buck spent his final years in San Antonio, Texas, where he died on February 10, 1950, at the age of 90, and was buried in Fort Sam Houston National Cemetery.

Military offices
| Preceded by Fred W. Sladen | Commanding General 3rd Division; August–October 1918 | Succeeded by Preston Brown |
| Preceded by John A. Johnston | Commanding General 34th Division; October 1918 | Succeeded by John A. Johnston |
