= USS General C. H. Muir =

1944 transport ship

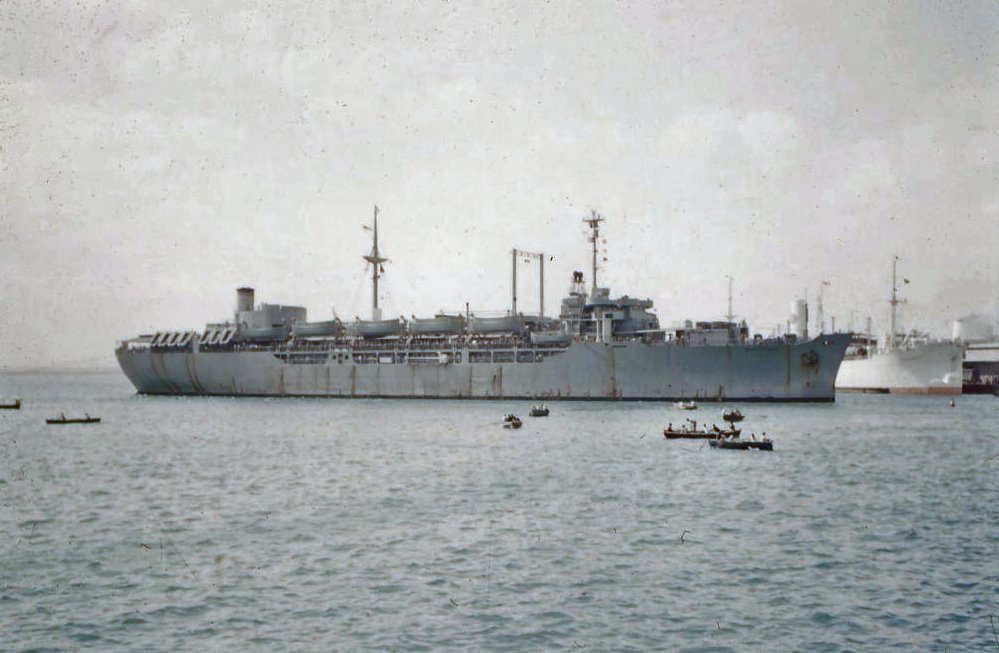
- USS General C. H. Muir (AP-142)

History

United States
- Name: General C. H. Muir
- Namesake: Charles Henry Muir
- Builder: Kaiser Co., Inc.; Richmond, California
- Laid down: date unknown
- Launched: 24 November 1944
- Acquired: 12 April 1945
- Commissioned: 12 April 1945
- Decommissioned: 18 June 1946
- In service: 18 June 1946 (Army); 1 March 1950 (MSTS)
- Out of service: 1 March 1950 (Army); 7 February 1955 (MSTS)
- Renamed: SS Chicago, 1969; SS San Juan, 1975
- Reclassified: T-AP-142, 1 March 1950
- Identification: IMO number: 6904806
- Fate: Scrapped after 1985

General characteristics
- Class & type: General G. O. Squier-class transport ship
- Displacement: 9,950 tons (light), 17,250 tons (full)
- Length: 522 ft 10 in (159.36 m)
- Beam: 71 ft 6 in (21.79 m)
- Draft: 24 ft (7.32 m)
- Propulsion: single-screw steam turbine with 9,900 shp (7,400 kW)
- Speed: 17 knots (31 km/h)
- Capacity: 3,823 troops
- Complement: 356 (officers and enlisted)
- Armament: 4 × 5"/38 caliber gun mounts; 4 × 40 mm AA gun mounts; 16 × 20 mm AA gun mounts

USS General C. H. Muir (AP-142) was a General G. O. Squier-class transport ship for the U.S. Navy in World War II. The ship was crewed by the U.S. Coast Guard until decommissioning. She was named in honor of U.S. Army general Charles Henry Muir. She was transferred to the U.S. Army as USAT General C. H. Muir in 1946. On 1 March 1950 she was transferred to the Military Sea Transportation Service (MSTS) as USNS General C. H. Muir (T-AP-142). She was later sold for commercial operation under the names SS Chicago and SS San Juan, and was scrapped some time after 1985.

== Operational history ==
General C. H. Muir (AP-142) was launched 24 November 1944 under Maritime Commission contract (MC #709) by Kaiser Co., Inc., Yard 3, Richmond, California; sponsored by Mrs. John H. Deasy; acquired and commissioned 12 April 1945 at Portland.

Following shakedown off San Diego, General C. H. Muir departed 13 May from San Francisco for her first troop-carrying voyage to the war zones of the Pacific. The ship brought troops to Pearl Harbor, Eniwetok, Ulithi, and Leyte; served briefly as a receiving ship in the Philippines; and returned to New York via the Panama Canal 14 August 1945. The long Pacific war over, General C. H. Muir sailed 3 September to pick up returning veterans at Mediterranean and Indian Ocean ports. She arrived New York 1 November, and then, retracing her steps to bring home another full contingent of troops, she finally returned New York 9 January 1946. The ship made three subsequent voyages, one to New Orleans and two to Europe, before decommissioning at Baltimore 18 June 1946. She was returned to the Maritime Commission on that day and turned over to the Army Transportation Service.

On 16 June 1949 she left Bremerhaven, Germany and arrived in Boston, Massachusetts on 24 June 1949.

Reacquired by the Navy 1 March 1950, General C. H. Muir began operations under MSTS and was re-designated T-AP-142.

On 16 March 1950 USNS General C. H. Muir arrived in Sydney with 1,278 displaced persons from Europe. This voyage was one of almost 150 "Fifth Fleet" voyages by some 40 ships bringing refugees of World War II to Australia. General C. H. Muir made one more such trip herself, arriving in Melbourne with 1,280 refugees on 26 October 1950. In Ancestry .com link she is mentioned arriving in New York carrying refugees from Bremen Germany 17 May 1951. On the list were 4 Latvian DPs. In Ancestry .com link she is mentioned arriving in New York from Bremerhaven, Germany 26 April 1952.

In addition to runs to Australia, the transport supported American forces in Europe, and on eastward crossings of the Atlantic brought back to the United States thousands of refugees under the International Refugee Organization.

In late 1952 the ship sailed from New York through the Mediterranean and thence through the Suez Canal bringing reinforcements to U.N. troops fighting in Korea. She made another long rotation voyage, stopping at many European and Asian ports before being placed in Reduced Operational Status at New York 30 September 1953. In August 1954 General C. H. Muir steamed through the Panama Canal to San Francisco and sailed once more to Korea with replacement troops. Upon her return the ship was placed in the Pacific Reserve Fleet at San Diego, 7 February 1955. She was returned to the Maritime Administration in 1960. She entered the National Defense Reserve Fleet 30 June, and was berthed at Suisun Bay, California until 1968.

At that time, the ship was sold under the MARAD Ship Exchange Program to Sea-Land Service of Wilmington, Delaware. In 1969 Sea Land had Todd Shipyard, Galveston convert her to an 18,455-gross ton container ship named SS Chicago, USCG ON 516542, IMO 6904806. The ship was sold in 1975 to Navieras de Puerto Rico, also known as the Puerto Rico Maritime Shipping Authority, of San Juan, Puerto Rico, who renamed her SS San Juan. The veteran ship operated through 1985, and was scrapped in 1988.

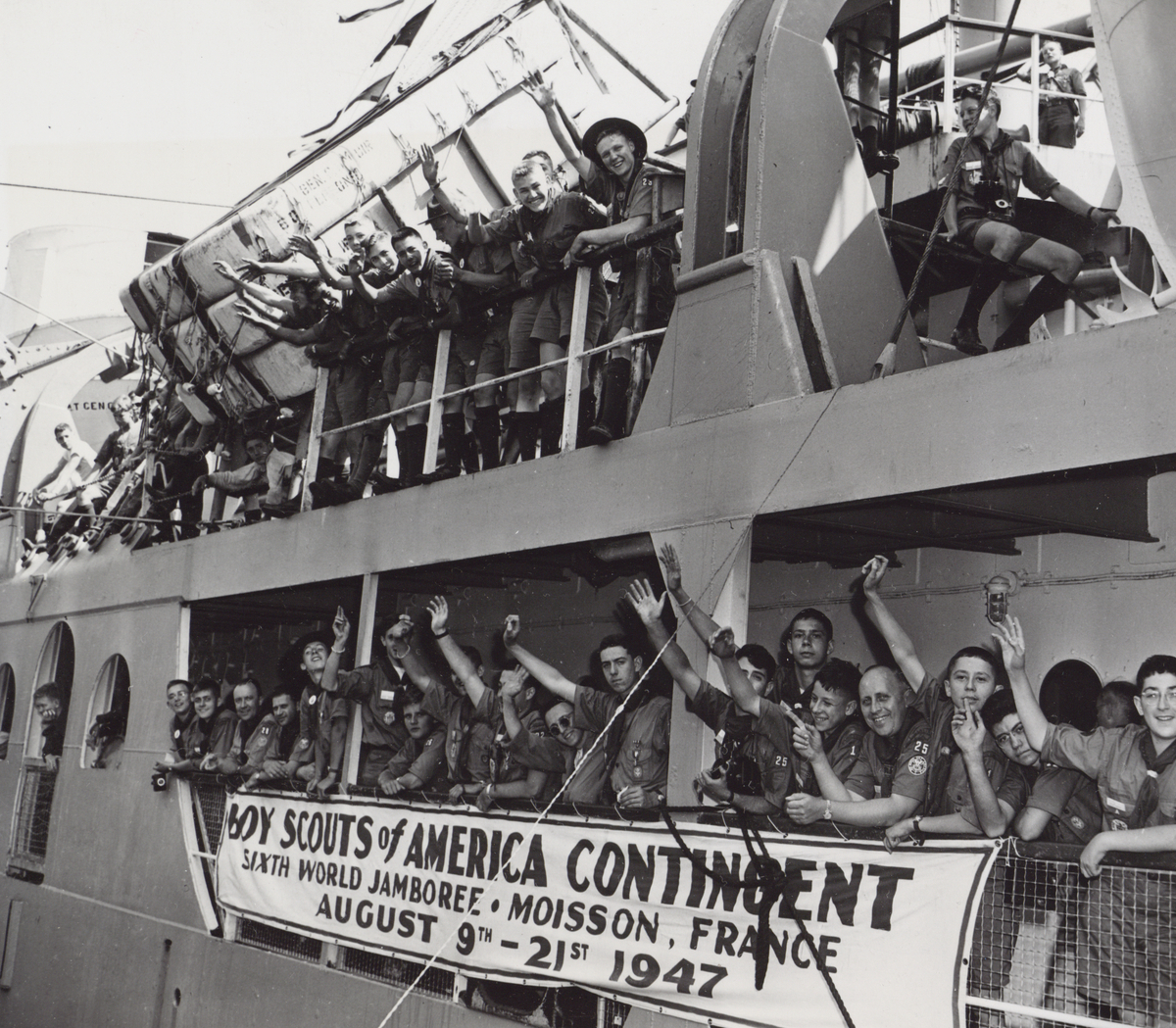
Boy Scouts from the Boy Scouts of America contingent's farewell from New York City onboard the USS General C. H. Muir, on their way to the 6th World Scout Jamboree.

General C. H. Muir received two battle stars for Korean War service.

The General Muir, restaurant and deli, Atlanta, Georgia, is named for this ship.

== Sources ==
- Cudahy, Brian J. (2006). Box Boats: How Container Ships Changed the World. Fordham University Press. ISBN 978-0-8232-2569-9.
- Williams, Greg H. (2013). World War II U.S. Navy Vessels in Private Hands. McFarland Books. ISBN 978-0-7864-6645-0.
