= John Miller Carson Jr. =

United States Army general

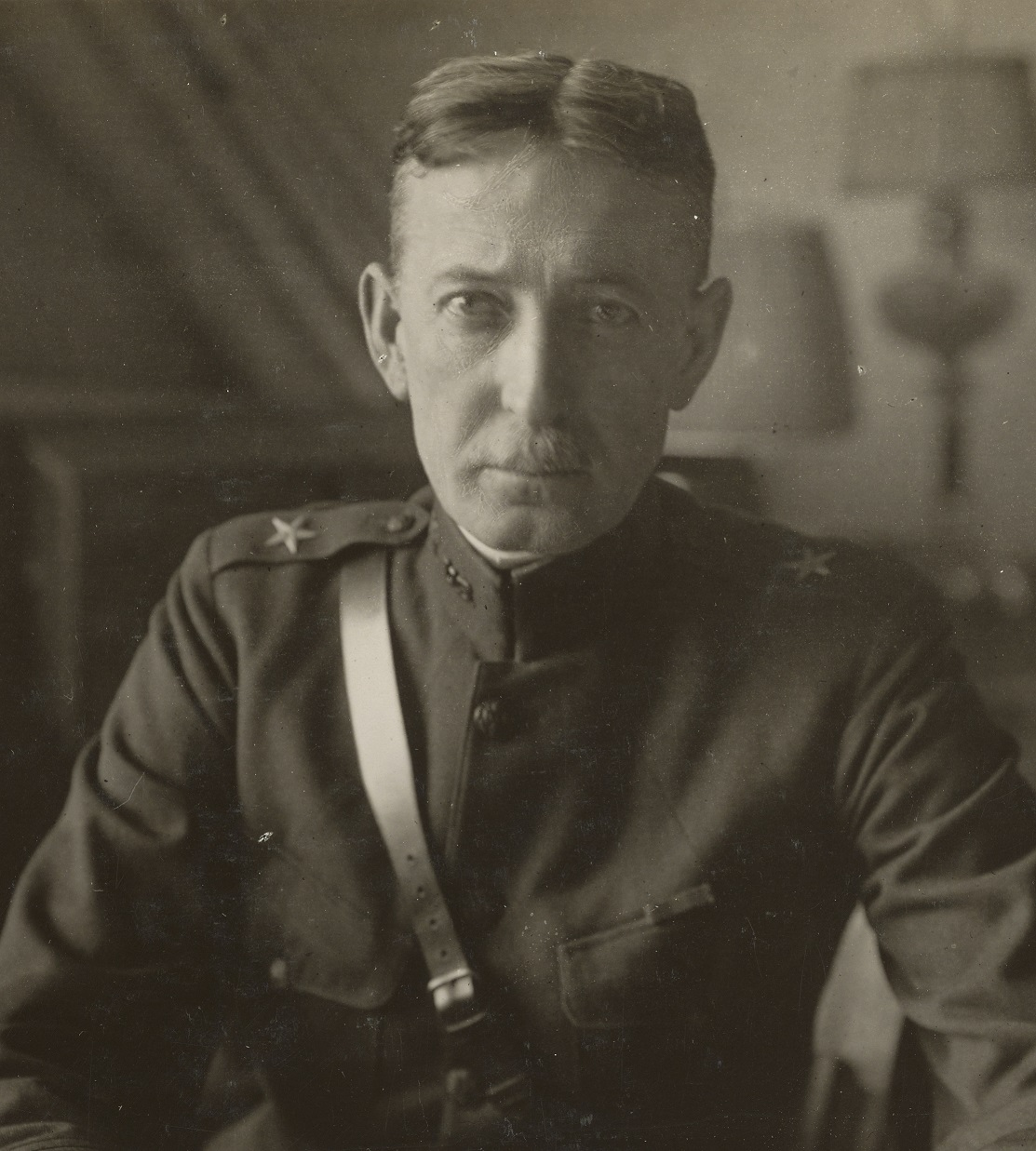
- Brig. Gen. Carson in Tours 1919
- Born: June 26, 1864; Philadelphia, Pennsylvania, US
- Died: January 18, 1956 (aged 91); Fort Jackson, South Carolina, US
- Military career
- Branch: United States Army
- Service number: 0-64
- Conflicts: World War I
- Awards: Army Distinguished Service Medal

John Miller Carson Jr. (June 26, 1864 – January 18, 1956) was a brigadier general in the United States Army during World War I.

== Early life and education ==
John Miller Carson was born on June 26, 1864, in Philadelphia, Pennsylvania. He attended the United States Military Academy and graduated fourteenth of thirty-nine in the class of 1885. His fellow students included Robert Lee Bullard, Charles Henry Muir, Henry Pinckney McCain, Beaumont B. Buck, Joseph E. Kuhn and Willard Ames Holbrook, all of whom would rise to high rank and responsibility in the future.

== Early military service ==
Carson served on frontier duty at Fort Reno. This was followed by an assignment as the Assistant to the Quartermaster of the Department of Missouri until August 1890.

== Awards ==
Carson received the Army Distinguished Service Medal for his service during World War I. The citation for the medal reads:

The President of the United States of America, authorized by Act of Congress, July 9, 1918, takes pleasure in presenting the Army Distinguished Service Medal to Brigadier General John Miller Carson, United States Army, for exceptionally meritorious and distinguished services to the Government of the United States, in a duty of great responsibility during World War I, as Chief Quartermaster, Line of Communications, American Expeditionary Forces, and later as Deputy Chief Quartermaster, American Expeditionary Forces, positions of great responsibility. Due to General Carson's ability and energy he perfected and directed the organization and operation of the Quartermaster Corps of the Line of Communications. Later he skillfully carried out the plans and projects to make the Quartermaster Corps an unfailing auxiliary to the combat troops of the American Expeditionary Forces. He has rendered services of much value.

== Death and legacy ==
Carson died on January 18, 1956, in Fort Jackson, South Carolina.
