= Lucius Roy Holbrook =

United States Army general

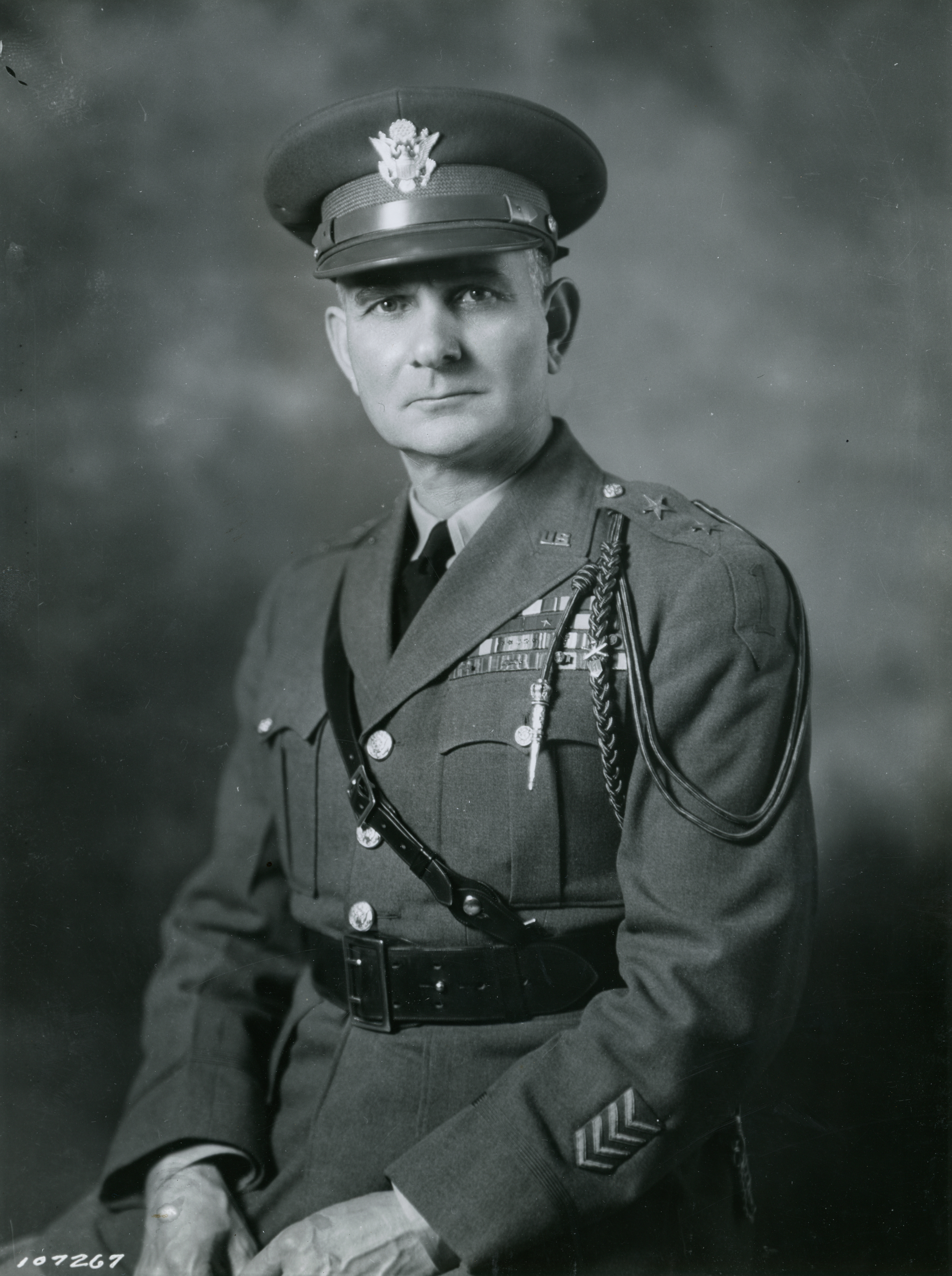
- Holbrook as 1st Infantry Division commander c. 1934–1935
- Born: April 30, 1875; Arkansaw, Wisconsin, U.S.
- Died: October 19, 1952 (aged 77); San Francisco, California, U.S.
- Burial place: Morris Hill Cemetery, Boise, Idaho
- Relatives: MG Willard Ames Holbrook (Brother); BG Willard Ames Holbrook Jr. (Nephew)
- Military career
- Allegiance: United States
- Branch: United States Army
- Service years: 1896–1939
- Rank: Major General
- Service number: 0-352
- Commands: Philippine Department
- Conflicts: Philippine–American War; *Battle of Arayat; *Battle of Cabiao; *Battle of San Isidro; *Battle of Santa Rosa II; *Battle of Talavera; World War I
- Awards: Distinguished Service Medal; Silver Star; Croix de Guerre; Légion d'honneur

Lucius Roy Holbrook (April 30, 1875 – October 19, 1952) was a major general who commanded the United States Army's Philippine Department from 1936 to 1938.

== Early life and family history ==
Holbrook was born in Arkansaw, Wisconsin. He was a son of Willard Francis and Mary (Ames) Holbrook. His father was born at Wrentham, Massachusetts, on April 27, 1827, and died September 17, 1886. Holbrook's mother, Mary Ames, was born November 19, 1840, at West Bridgewater, Massachusetts, and died on July 12, 1889.

Holbrook graduated from high school in Northfield, Minnesota, in 1892. He entered the United States Military Academy on June 15, 1892, and graduated on June 12, 1896, as a second lieutenant of Cavalry.

His brother, Willard was an army officer who attained the rank of major general. His nephew, Willard Ames Holbrook Jr., also pursued an army career and retired as a brigadier general.

== Military career ==
Holbrook served with the 4th Cavalry Regiment at Fort Walla Walla, Washington, until December 22, 1896, and at Boise Barracks, Fort Sherman and Wardner, Idaho, until May 1899. During his time at Boise, he met Henrietta Coffin, (January 7, 1877 – March 28, 1965), the daughter of Frank R. Coffin, a merchant and banker and Charlotte Irene (Quivey) Coffin. The couple were married on June 7, 1899, at the Presidio of San Francisco in California and were the parents of three sons.

On June 24, 1889, Holbrook was posted to the Philippine Islands and during the Philippine–American War, he participated in the Northern Campaign, fighting in battles at Arayat, Cabiao, San Isidro, Santa Rosa, and Talavera. He then served with General Theodore Schwan's Southern Expedition from January 3 to February 18, 1900, and was at the Battles of Muntinlupa and Biñan, Carmona and Silan, Tiaong, Candaleria and Tayabas. Promoted to first lieutenant on January 23, 1900, later in the year he was posted to Troop H, 6th Cavalry Regiment, which was stationed at Boise Barracks in Idaho, until February 11, 1901.

Holbrook returned to the Philippines in March 1901 and served with Troop B, 15th Cavalry Regiment and Troop I, 4th Cavalry Regiment, based at Manila, until July 1, 1901, and at Fort Riley, Kansas, until August 7, 1902. He was promoted to captain on July 15, 1902. He was then assigned to Camp Stotsenburg, in the Philippines, until June 14, 1903. He returned to the US and served at Fort Logan, Colorado, and Fort Huachuca, Arizona, until August 28, 1904.

Holbrook was a distinguished graduate of the Infantry-Cavalry School at Fort Leavenworth, Kansas, on July 2, 1905, and then attended the United States Army Command and General Staff College until July 25, 1906. Holbrook was the umpire for maneuvers at Fort D.A. Russell, Wyoming (later Fort Francis E. Warren) until September 16, 1906. He then joined the 5th Cavalry Regiment at Fort Wingate, New Mexico, until October 24, 1907.

Holbrook was assigned to the Commissary Department where he commanded the first training school for army bakers and cooks until March 9, 1911. During this time, he wrote the army's first cooking manuals. He was assisted in this endeavor by Color Sergeant, later Major Patrick Dunne. These works include:

- Handling the Straight Army Ration and Baking Bread. A Practical Manual for Army Cooks, Mess Stewards, and Post Bakers, in Field or in Garrison and on the March; for Company Officers, Post Treasurers and Mess Officers of Troops Aboard Army Transports with Patrick Dunne (1905)
- The Army Baker: A Manual Prepared for the Use of Students of the Training School for Bakers and Cooks (1910)
- The Mess Sergeant's Handbook with Patrick Dunne (1916)
- The Mess Officer's Assistant

Holbrook then served as Assistant to the Chief Commissary, Maneuver Division, San Antonio, Texas, until July 21, 1911, and at Fort Riley until September 20, 1911. He was then ordered to Paris, France, where he attended the Ecole de L'Intendance (the French Army School of Supply) until December 15, 1912.

Holbrook was stationed at Schofield Barracks, Hawaii, until April 4, 1916, and was then a quartermaster at Fort Riley, until July 1916. In 1916, he served with General John J. Pershing's Mexican Expeditionary Forces, as commander of the bakeries. This was the first use of the army field oven, which he had invented. He was promoted to major on July 1, 1916.

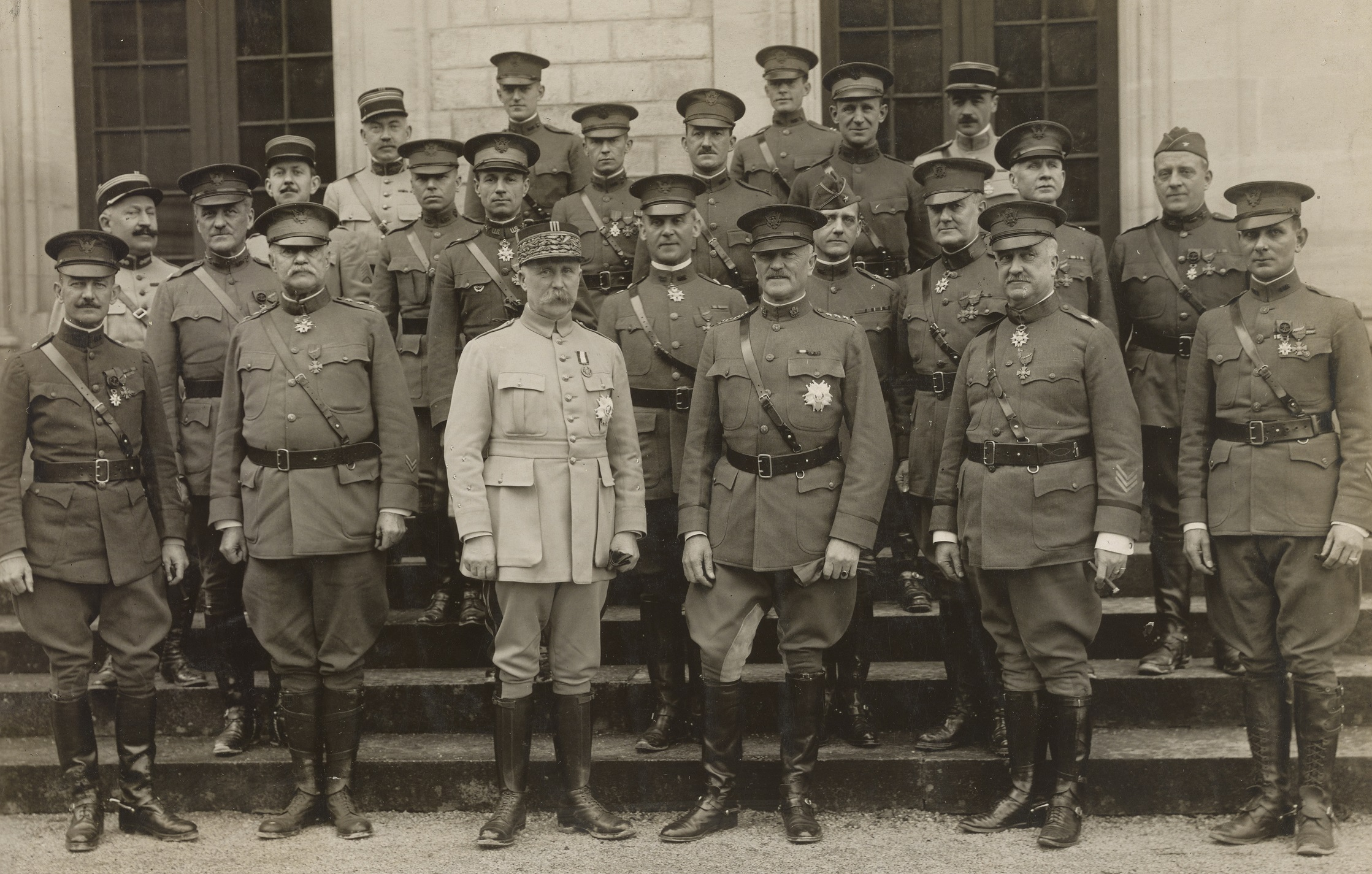
Group of Commanders and Officers after dinner with Gen. John J. Pershing. Front row: McCoy, Hunter Liggett, Philippe Petain, John J. Pershing, James W. McAndrew, Lucius Roy Holbrook.

Holbrook then served at Fort Sam Houston, Texas, until March 7, 1917, where he was in command of the 7th Field Artillery Regiment of the 1st Division, and he sailed with it for France on July 31, 1917, almost four months after the American entry into World War I. When the United States became involved in World War I, this was the first artillery unit to be sent to France, and it fired the first US artillery shell against Germany.

While with the American Expeditionary Force, Holbrook was at Le Valdahon, from August 14 to October 18, 1917; at Sommerviller Sector, October 21 to November 20, 1917; Ansauville Sector, January 19 to April 4, 1918; Cantigny Sector, April 20 to June 8, 1918; Montdidier-Noyon Defense, June 9 to 13, 1918; and Saizerais Sector, August 4, to 16, 1918.

Holbrook was promoted to the temporary rank of brigadier general on August 16, 1918. He then commanded the 54th Field Artillery Brigade, in training until October 3, 1918; served with the 1st Field Artillery Brigade, in the Meuse-Argonne Offensive, until November 7, 1918; and again commanded the 54th Field Artillery Brigade, at Chateau Reynel and elsewhere until May 22, 1919.

Holbrook returned to the United States in May 1919 and commanded Camp Bragg, North Carolina, from May 16, 1919, until July 1, 1919, when he became the head of the Artillery Department of the Command and General Staff School at Fort Leavenworth, Kansas. On July 15, 1919, he reverted to the rank of lieutenant colonel. On February 24, 1920, he was promoted to colonel.

From January 27, 1921, to May 4, 1922, Holbrook served as assistant chief of staff for supply, Ninth Corps Area; and as chief of staff, Ninth Corps Area until June 30, 1924. After this assignment, he became the chief of staff, Non-Divisional Group, Organized Reserve Corps, Ninth Corps Area, until June 30, 1925; and inspector, Ninth Corps Area, until October 19, 1925. He was promoted to brigadier general on October 20, 1925.

Holbrook then commanded troops at Fort Douglas, Utah, until August 19, 1926. He then commanded Camp Stotsenburg, in the Philippines until May 11, 1929. Afterwards, he commanded Fort Bragg, North Carolina, from August 20, 1929, until October 5, 1930, when he became commander of the 1st Division and Fort Hamilton, New York, until November 9, 1935. He was promoted to major general on December 28, 1933.

On January 22, 1936, Holbrook became commanding general of the Philippine Department until 1938. Holbrook retired on January 31, 1939.

== Military decorations ==
- Distinguished Service Medal. His citation reads:

For exceptionally meritorious and distinguished services. As commander of the six battalions of Artillery and the 1st Field Artillery Brigade, he, with great distinction, directed the artillery support of the 1st Division in the attacks on Cantigny and the Soissons salient. His careful judgment and high military attainments where shown in the accuracy and timeliness of the fire from the batteries under his direction, which despite the difficulties involved, contributed materially to the success of the operation.

- Silver Star for Gallantry. His citation reads:

In action against insurgent forces near Tayabas, Philippine Islands, on January 21, 1900

- Silver Star with oak leaf cluster for bravery
  - Montenegro
- Mexican Service Medal
- World War I Victory Medal
- Army of Occupation of Germany Medal
- Montenegrin Ordre du Prince Danilo I (3rd Class)
- Montenegrin Medaille de Bravoure d'Argent
- French Croix de Guerre
- French Legion of Honor (Officer)
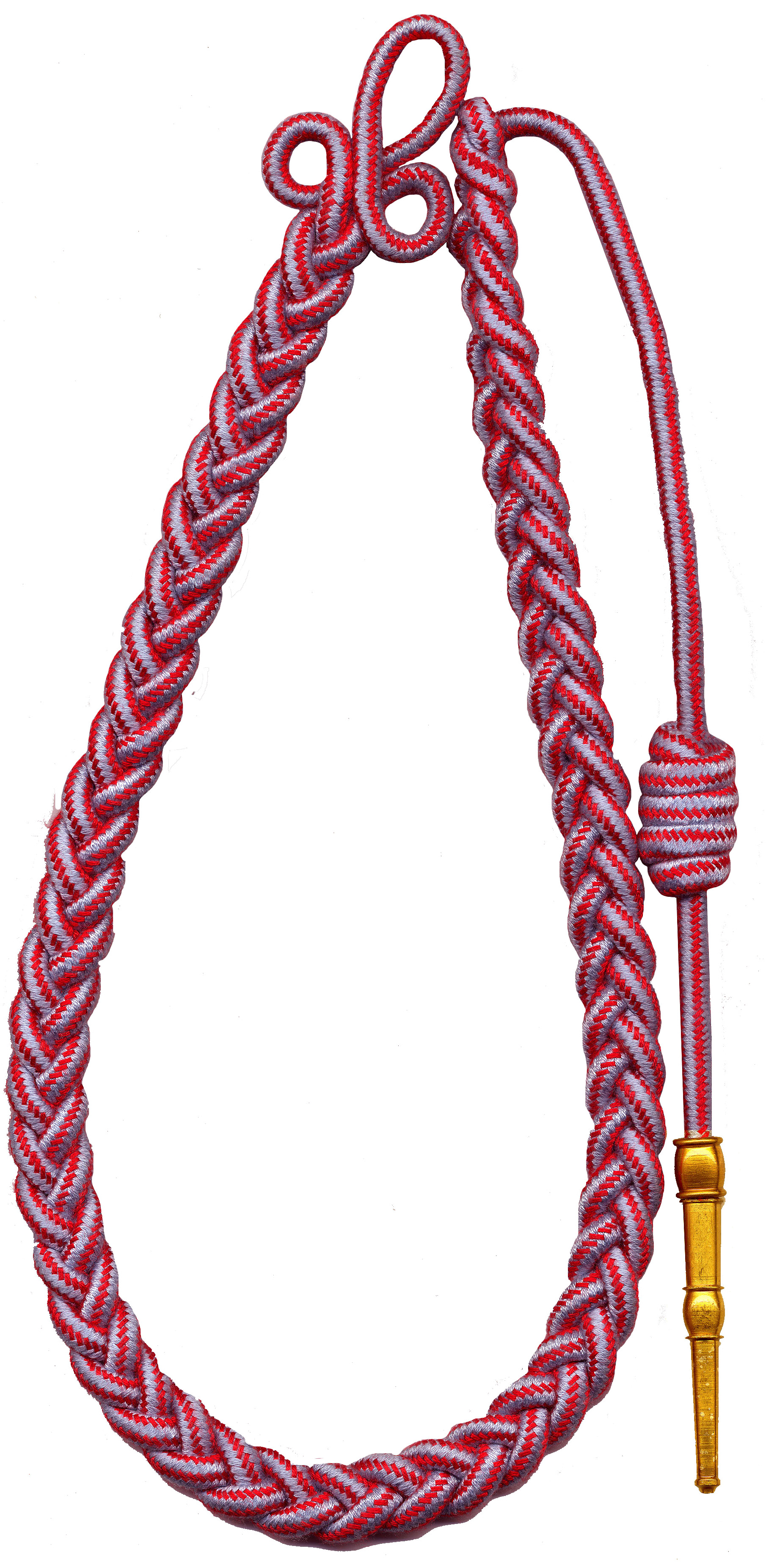
- Fourragère of the French Croix du Guerre

== Dates of promotion ==
- June 12, 1896 – Second Lieutenant
- January 23, 1900 – First Lieutenant
- July 15, 1902 – Captain
- July 1, 1916 – Major
- May 15, 1917 – Lieutenant Colonel
- August 5, 1917 – Colonel (temporary)
- August 16, 1918 – Brigadier General (temporary)
- July 15, 1919 – Lieutenant Colonel
- February 24, 1920 – Colonel
- October 20, 1925 – Brigadier General
- December 28, 1933 – Major General
- January 31, 1939 – Major General (Retired)

== Children ==
The Holbrook's children:

- Franklin Rayle Coffin, born on May 2, 1901. Advancing to the rank of major general, he retired in December 1955. On May 7, 1927, he married Virginia Howell of Trenton, New Jersey, born on January 8, 1902. They are the parents of, Franklin Coffin Holbrook, who attained the rank of first lieutenant. He married Nancy Bascom Palmer and they had two children: Palmer Lee, and Franklin Rayle Coffin Holbrook, II.
- John Ames, born on October 26, 1903. He became a captain in the United States Navy and retired. On August 8, 1952, he married Barbara Barber of Berkeley, California. By a previous marriage, he was the father of, John Ames Jr., born on April 1, 1936.
- Lucius Roy, born July 30, 1906. He held the rank of lieutenant colonel in the United States Air Force. On July 16, 1934, he married Mary Gertrude Sutterle in Shanghai, China. They had two children: Lucius Roy, 3rd, born January 4, 1944; and Marilyn Sutterle, born September 7, 1948.

== Death ==
Major General Lucius R. Holbrook died on October 19, 1952, at Letterman Army Hospital. His remains were taken by train to Boise, Idaho.

Military offices
Preceded by Charles Henry Muir	Commandant of the Command and General Staff College; August–September 1920	Succeeded by Hugh Aloysius Drum
