= Willard Ames Holbrook =

Major General of US Army

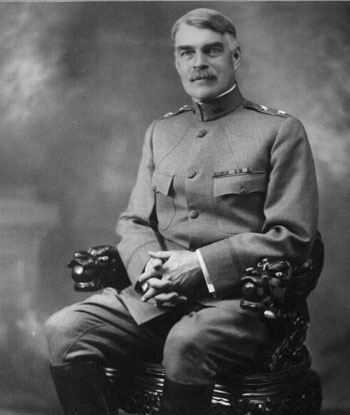
- Born: July 23, 1860; Arkansaw, Wisconsin, United States
- Died: July 18, 1932 (aged 71); Washington, D.C., United States
- Burial place: Arlington National Cemetery, Virginia, United States
- Relatives: Willard Ames Holbrook Jr. (Son); Lucius Roy Holbrook (Brother); David S. Stanley (Father-in-law)
- Military career
- Allegiance: United States
- Branch: United States Army
- Service years: 1885–1924
- Rank: Major General
- Unit: Cavalry Branch
- Commands: 165th Brigade; 9th Division
- Conflicts: Spanish–American War; World War I
- Awards: Army Distinguished Service Medal

Major General Willard Ames Holbrook (July 23, 1860 – July 18, 1932) was a United States Army officer who served for almost forty years. Coming from a family with long military tradition, he was the father of future Brigadier General Willard Ames Holbrook Jr. and brother of Major General Lucius Roy Holbrook.

== Early life ==
Holbrook was born on July 23, 1860, in Arkansaw, Wisconsin. He graduated 17th of 39 from the United States Military Academy in 1885. Among his classmates were future general officers such as Robert Lee Bullard, Joseph E. Kuhn, Beaumont B. Buck, Charles Henry Muir, William Franklin Martin, George Washington Burr, Daniel Bradford Devore. He was assigned to the 1st Cavalry Regiment (later he was assigned to the 7th Cavalry Regiment).

== Military career ==
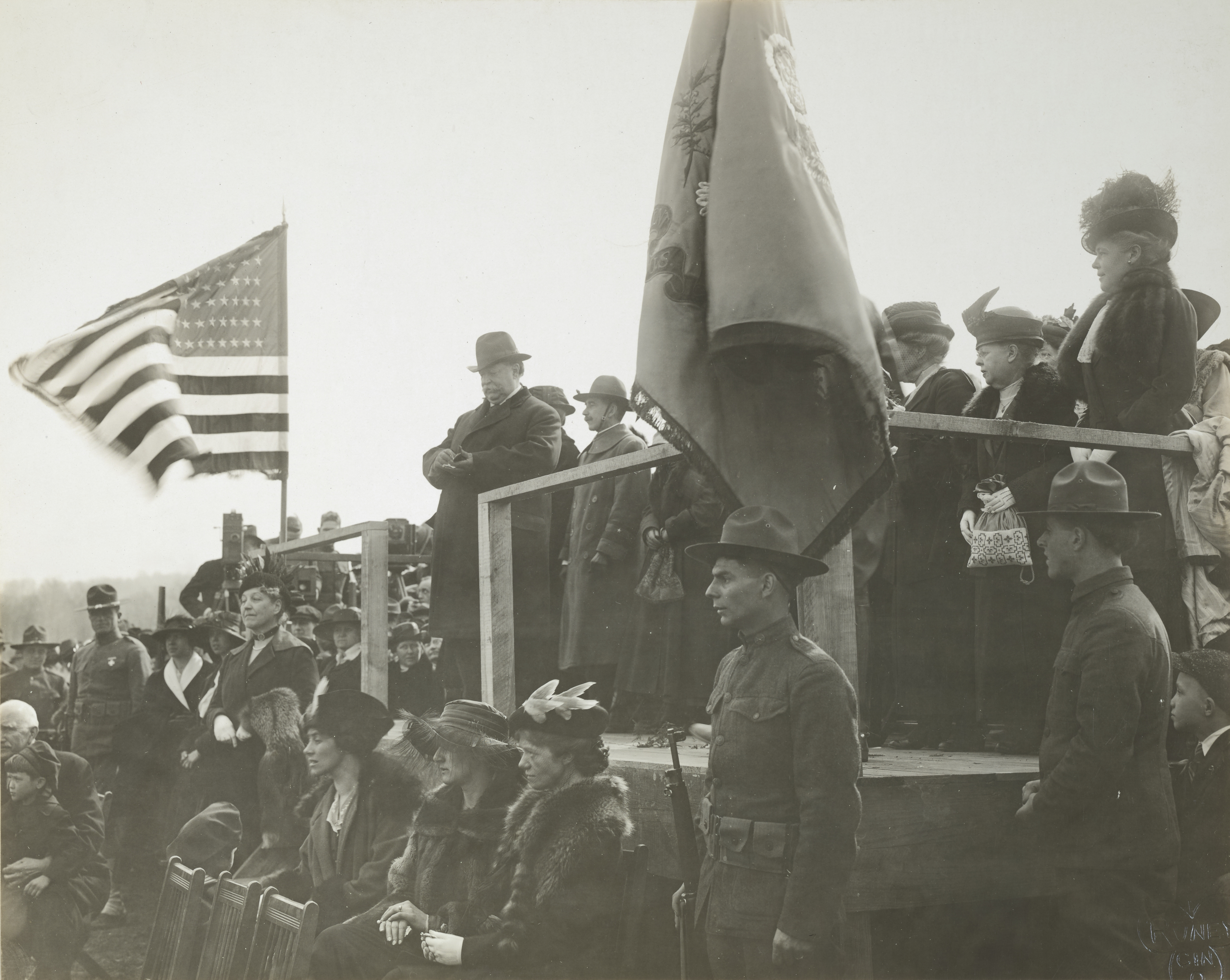
Ex-President William Howard Taft presents colors at Camp Sherman, Ohio, August 1918. Stood to the right of ex-President Taft is Brigadier General Willard A. Holbrook.

Holbrook was stationed in Cuba during the Spanish–American War. From 1901 to 1902, following the war, he served as Civil Governor of Antique, Philippines.

After America entered World War I in April 1917, Holbrook was promoted to brigadier general in command of the 165th Infantry Brigade. In April 1918, he was further promoted to major general and placed in command of the 9th Infantry Division. Holbrook's final assignment was as Chief of the U.S. Cavalry. He retired from the Army on July 23, 1924.

== Marriage and children ==
In 1902, Holbrook married Anna Huntington Stanley (1864 – 1907), daughter of Major General David S. Stanley.

- Willard Ames Holbrook Jr. – served as brigadier general
- David Stanley Holbrook – served as a first lieutenant and died from a gunshot wound in the Philippines in 1926.

== Death ==
Holbrook died at the Walter Reed Army Medical Center in Washington, D.C., on July 18, 1932. He is buried at Arlington National Cemetery along with his wife, Anna, and son, David.

== Awards ==
His military awards include the Army Distinguished Service Medal, the citation for which reads:

The President of the United States of America, authorized by Act of Congress, July 9, 1918, takes pleasure in presenting the Army Distinguished Service Medal to Major General Willard Ames Holbrook, United States Army, for exceptionally meritorious and distinguished services to the Government of the United States, in a duty of great responsibility. As Commanding General, Southern Department, where his firmness and tact in handling a threatening situation on the Mexican border materially improved conditions between the United States and Mexico.

== See also ==
- 5th Cavalry Regiment (United States)
- 17th Cavalry Regiment (United States)
- Lucius Roy Holbrook

Military offices
Preceded by Charles Carr Clark	Commanding General 9th Division; September−October 1918	Succeeded by James A. Ryan
Preceded by James A. Ryan	Commanding General 9th Division; 1918−1919	Succeeded by Post deactivated
