= George Washington Burr =

United States Army general

George Washington Burr Jr.
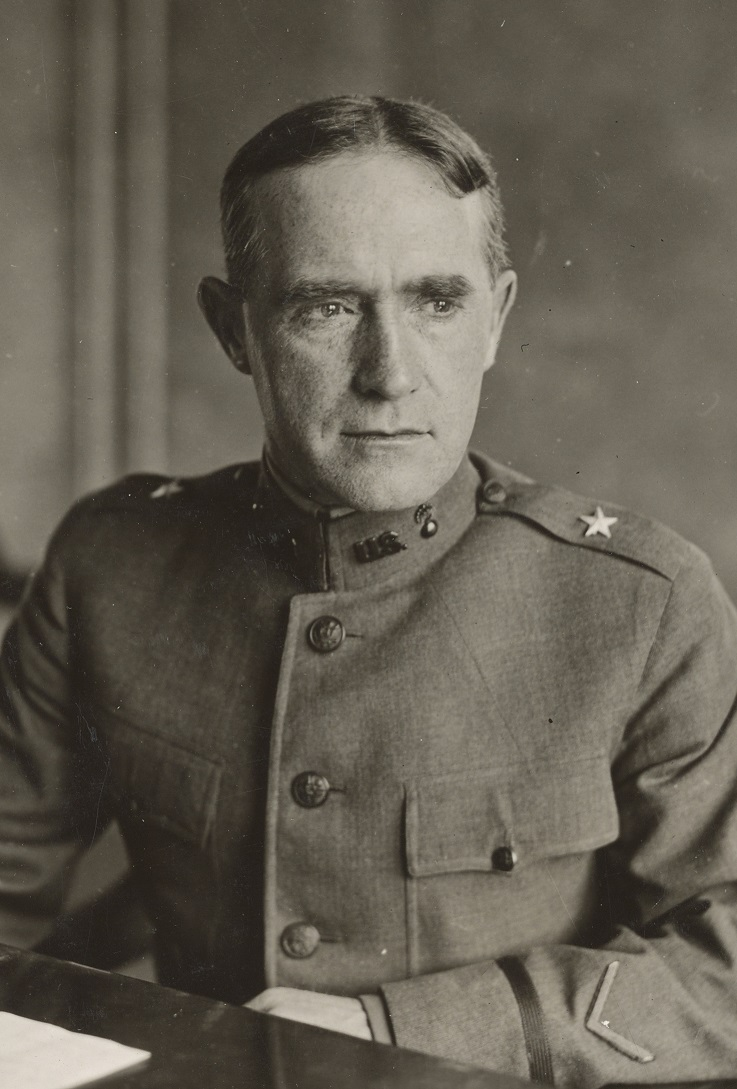
- Brigadier General G.W. Burr in 1918
- Born: December 3, 1865; Tolono, Illinois, US
- Died: March 4, 1923 (aged 57); Washington, D.C., US
- Burial place: Arlington National Cemetery
- Military career
- Allegiance: United States
- Branch: United States Army; Ordnance Corps
- Service years: 1885–1922
- Rank: Major general
- Service number: 0-66
- Awards: Distinguished Service Medal; Companion of the Order of the Bath

George Washington Burr Jr. (1865–1923) was an American general during World War I.

== Early life ==
George Washington Burr Jr. was born in Tolono, Illinois to George and Nancy Burr on December 3, 1865.

== Career ==
G. W. Burr attended the United States Military Academy and graduated in 1888. He became an officer in the 1st artillery and later taught Military Science and Tactics at the Agricultural and Mechanical College of Mississippi until 1893. He worked for the Ordnance Department and was promoted to the rank of captain in April 1899. He was involved in ammunition development at the Rock Island Arsenal, where he became commanding officer after his promotion to lieutenant colonel in 1910. With the involvement in World War I, the Arsenal grew from 2500 to 13000 employees. In 1918, as part of the American Expeditionary Forces, Burr was sent to England to buy war material and to study production techniques in the United Kingdom. In March 1919 Burr was promoted to the rank of major general and became successor of George Washington Goethals as Assistant Chief of Staff, Director of Purchase, Storage and Traffic. He was relieved in 1920 on his own request and the War Department sent him to England to negotiate the settlement of outstanding claims between the two governments, resulting in the ″Burr-Niemeyer Agreement″ in November 1920. Under the agreement, the United States had to pay 560.000£, 3.112.928 in USD (1920 value), to the British government.

G. W. Burr received the Army Distinguished Service Medal for his service in World War I.

== Death and legacy ==
Burr died on 4 March 1923 while on duty as Assistant to the Chief of Ordnance in Washington, D.C.
