= Belmont Plantation (Albemarle County, Virginia) =

Coordinates: 38°1′19.5″N 78°22′40.03″W

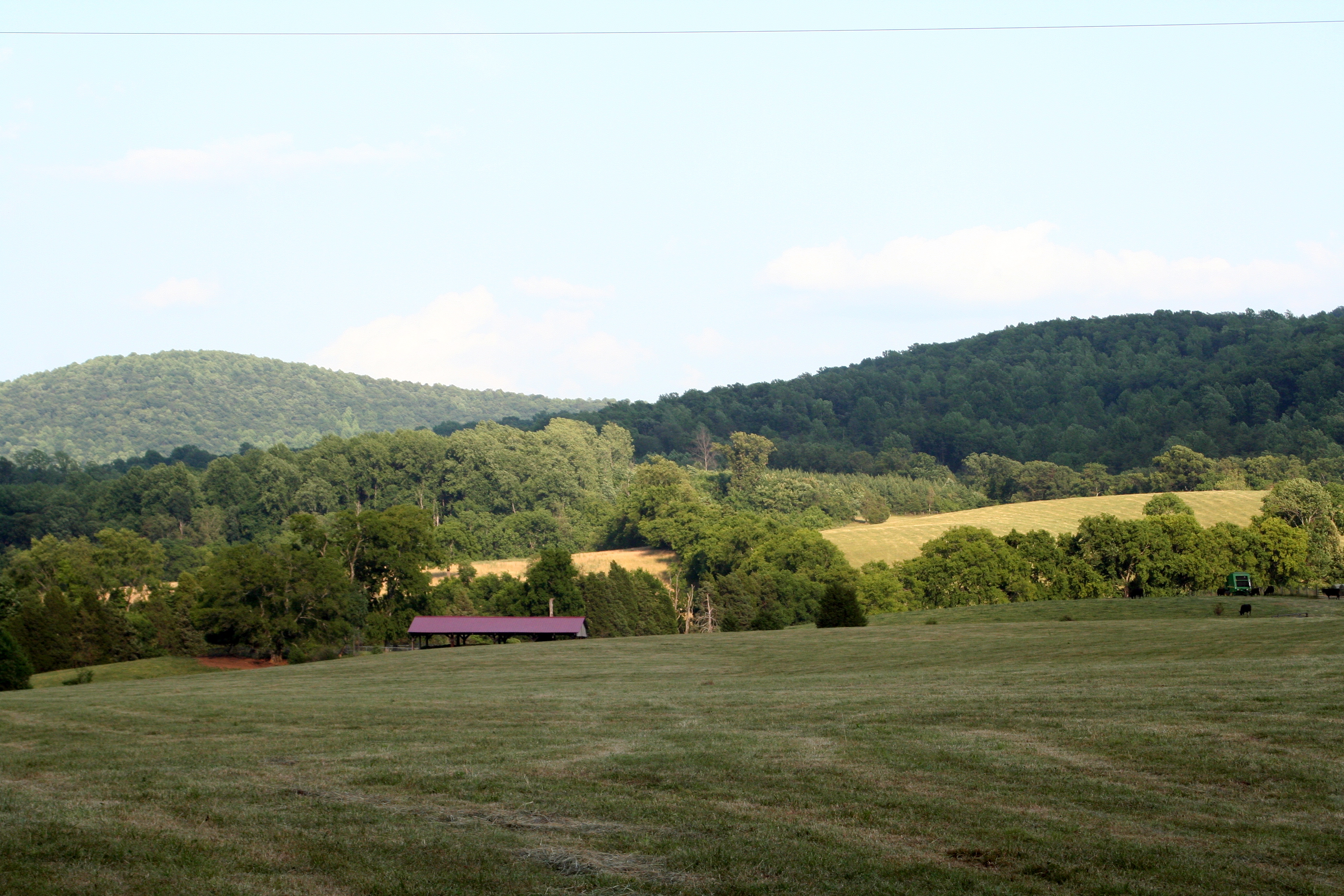
Southwest Mountains, Belmont is in between these mountains and Rivanna River to the south.

Belmont Plantation, also known as Belmont Estate and Belmont, is a locale in Albemarle County, Virginia, and the site of a 19th-century plantation. It was among the first patents in Albemarle County, patented in the 1730s. Matthew Graves sold a 2,500-acre-tract to John Harvie Sr., a friend of Peter Jefferson and a guardian of Thomas Jefferson. After his death in 1767, the property was inherited by his son John Harvie, Jr. Harvie lived at Belmont for several years, but after he was appointed the Registrar of Land Grants, he moved to Richmond, Virginia and John Rogers oversaw the plantation. Rogers was known for his progressive approaches to agriculture, including methods for improving the quality of the soil after years of tobacco crops.

In 1811, Dr. Charles Everett purchased 636 or 650 acres of the Belmont estate from John Rogers. This split the tract and Rogers' portion was named East Belmont. He owned slaves in the 1800s, whom he freed. In his will, he stipulated creation of a community for them in Pennsylvania, a free state. It was called Pandenarium. Everett died in 1848 and left Belmont to his nephew, Charles D. Everett. It remained within the Everett family until 1927, during which there were significant changes to the residence. After World War II, there was a major remodeling of the interior and exterior of the manor.

Belmont was used as a location in the filming of Giant (1956), starring Rock Hudson and Elizabeth Taylor.

== Prehistory and early history ==
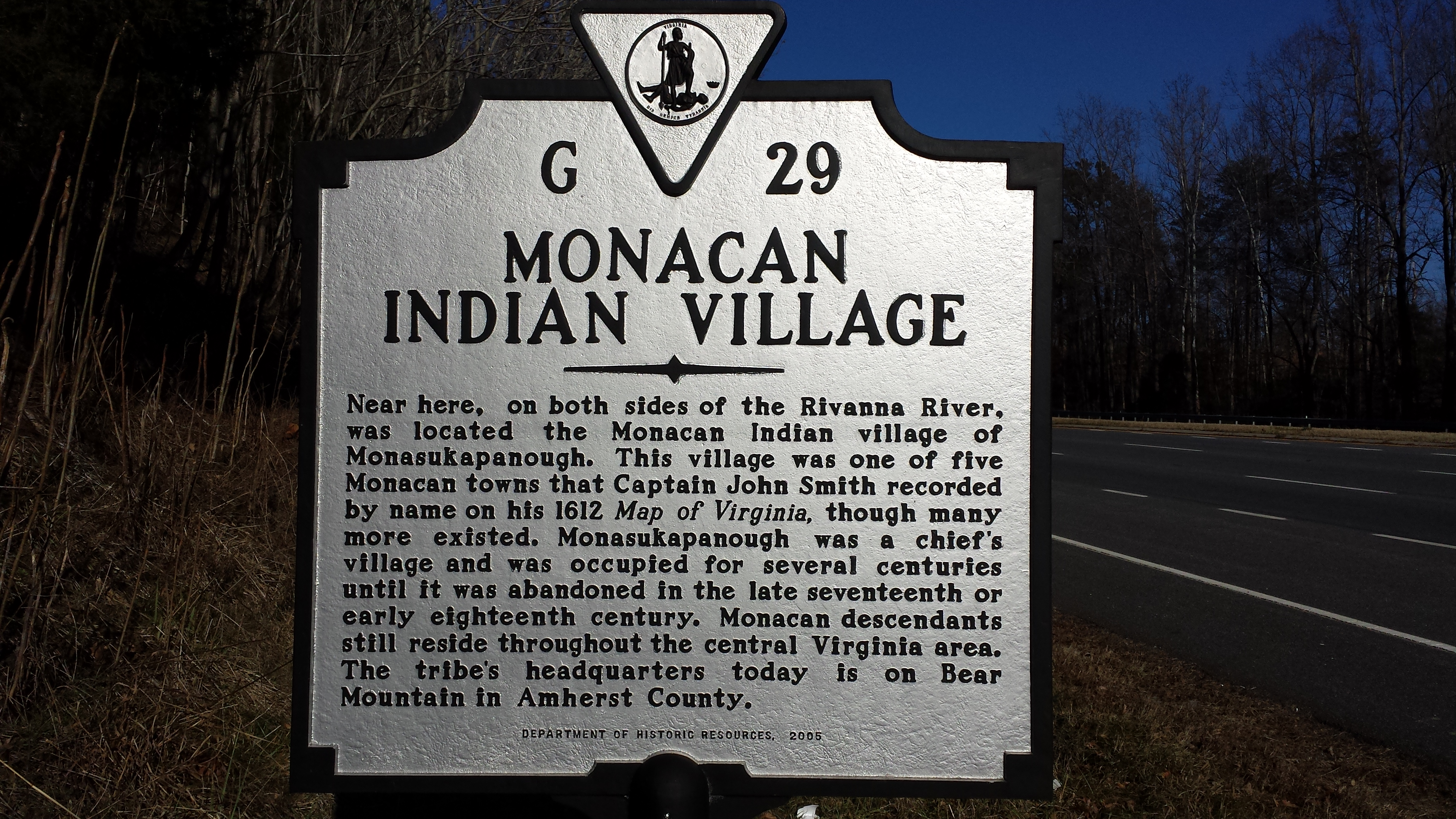
Historical marker near the site of the Monacan village of Monasukapanough in northern Albemarle County, Virginia.

Monacan Indian Nation people lived in present-day Albemarle County, in a village north of Charlottesville. Tracts were first patented in the area in 1727. The tract for Belmont was patented in the 1730s. Belmont is located just north of Route 250 at Shadwell, off Louisa Road (Route 22) and southwest of East Belmont. (Note: In the early 1700s, people traveled from Richmond, Virginia to the Charlottesville area along an east-to-west trail that became Three Notch'd Road, and generally parallels present-day Route 250. Route 22 was the starting point to travel to Fredericksburg, Virginia; it was an easier and faster route from the Keswick (and Shadwell) area to a large town.)

In the early 18th century, large tracts of land were acquired in what is now northeastern Albemarle County by people from the Tidewater region of Virginia. They tended to stay near the Atlantic coast and had servants and slaves establish tobacco plantations in the western wilderness. In some cases, the land was not developed for several decades.

== Residence and plantation ==
In 1734, Thomas Graves and others patented more than 3,277 acres of land north of the Rivanna River and that crossed the South West Mountains. Belmont is between the Rivanna River and the South West Mountains, (Note: John Graves sold land in the Everettsville neighborhood to William Gooch in 1751.) and alongside Edge Hill and near Thomas Jefferson's holdings in northeastern Albemarle County.

=== The Harvies ===
Colonel John Harvie Sr., an immigrant from Scotland, bought Belmont from Matthew Graves in the 1730s. It was a 2,500-acre tract. On the land was a one-and-a-half story house. Harvie settled in Albemarle County around 1736. He was a good friend of Peter Jefferson and became Thomas Jefferson's guardian after Peter's death. Harvie died in 1767.

In 1767, John Harvie, Jr. inherited Belmont. Although he had other estates, he lived there until he was appointed Register of the Land Office in Richmond, Virginia. John Rogers was the overseer of the plantation once Harvie moved to Richmond. (Note: Rogers was the overseer of Monticello beginning in 1791 and later was also the overseer of Shadwell.) Harvie died in 1807, and Belmont was sold that year to John Rogers. (Note: John Rogers was the son of Giles Rogers who in the 1690s immigrated from Worcestershire, England to Virginia.) Rogers—along with Jefferson, James Madison, and James Monroe—were founders of the Agricultural Society of Albemarle. Rogers was "in the forefront of the agricultural reform movement" in the county in the early 19th century.

There was a dispute about border of the land of Belmont and Jefferson's holdings beginning in 1791. The dispute was resolved in a compromise on February 17, 1810.

Martha Jefferson Randolph and Thomas Mann Randolph Jr. lived at Belmont from November 1797 until the summer of 1799, after they decided to settle primarily in Albemarle County, while maintaining the Varina estate. They lived at Belmont during construction at Monticello. John Harvie Jr., besides being a friend of Thomas Jefferson, was the father-in-law of Thomas Mann Randolph Sr., whose second marriage was to Gabriella Harvie. In January 1800, the Randolphs moved into Edge Hill (a neighboring estate).

=== The Everetts ===
In 1811, Dr. Charles Everett purchased 636 or 650 acres of the Belmont estate from John Rogers. Rogers retained 1200 acres of the tract, which was named East Belmont. Everett moved to Belmont in 1813. In 1821, he purchased a 400-acre tract from Thomas Jefferson called Pouncey's, which was part of the Shadwell tract. The area was also known as Everettsville. He began planning in 1837 to free his slaves and provide a community for them. His nephew, Dr. Charles D. (Cutlip) Everett, a physician from Philadelphia, led the effort. Everett lived at Belmont until his death in 1848. In his will, Everett left Belmont to his nephew, Charles D. Everett.

Dr. Charles D. Everett, who also performed as a physician for Jefferson, moved into Belmont in 1849. In 1858, Everett built a new brick house and had old manor split up into several outbuildings on the property. Called the "Great House", it was a modern residence with hot and cold running water. The house was destroyed in a fire in 1883. The main section of the former house was moved back to its original site and improvements were made to expand the living space and cover the building in clapboard. It was inhabited until 1898. Belmont stayed within the Everett family until 1927 when it was sold.

=== 20th century ===
Alfred Braun bought Belmont after World War II and remodeled it inside and out, changing the two-story porch to a Greek Revival portico.

== Giant (1956 film) ==
External images
- Filming of Giant at Belmont
- Rock Hudson at Belmont
- Elizabeth Taylor at Belmont
- Picnic lunch break at Belmont

Belmont was used in the filming of Giant in 1955. It was used to portray a manor in Ardmore, Maryland. The Keswick railroad station was also used to depict an Ardmore railroad station in the first part of the film. Jordan "Bick" Benedict, played by Rock Hudson, arrives at Ardmore to purchase a stallion from the Lynnton family.
