= John Rogers (Albemarle County, Virginia) =

American planter (died 1838)

- Died: 1838
- Occupations: Farmer, plantation overseer
- Known for: Monticello overseer, East Belmont owner, and agricultural reform leader
- Relatives: George Rogers Clark (first cousin); William Clark (first cousin, of the Lewis and Clark Expedition); William Byrd (grand uncle)

John Rogers was an overseer of three plantations, including Thomas Jefferson's Monticello. He then owned and operated the East Belmont plantation. Rogers was a co-founder of the Albemarle Agricultural Society, and was known for his revolutionary agricultural reforms. His influence and knowledge-gathering was centered among planters in Albemarle County, as well as across the country and in Europe.

== Early years ==
John Rogers was the son of Mary Trice and Byrd Rogers, who were married in King and Queen County, Virginia. They had two other sons, Philip and Byrd. His father married twice, the second time to Martha Trice, his first wife's sister. (Note: Lewises, Meriwethers and Their Kin states that John's mother was Martha.) Martha Trice and Byrd had the following children: Lewis, Elizabeth, Lucy, Anne, and George.

Byrd was a lieutenant of the Cincinnati militia and held that rank during the American Revolutionary War. Byrd's siblings were George, Giles, and Ann, who married George Clark and was the mother of George Rogers Clark. John and Byrd descended from Giles Rogers who immigrated from Worcestershire, England to Virginia in the 1690s and settled in King and Queen County, Virginia. They also descended from Englishman John Rogers, the martyr of Smithfield who was burned at the stake in 1555.

== Career ==
=== Overseer ===
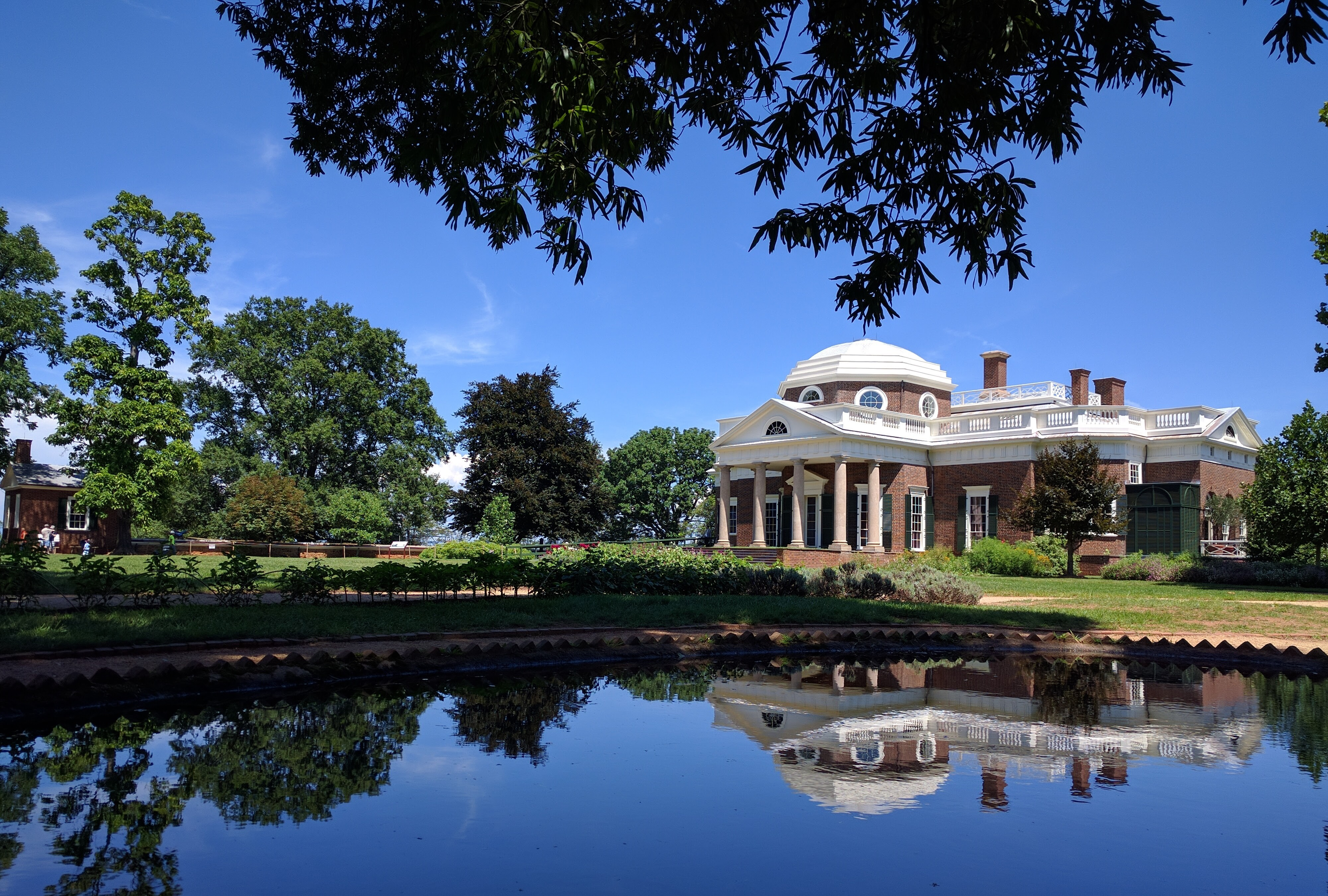
Thomas Jefferson's Monticello in Charlottesville, Virginia

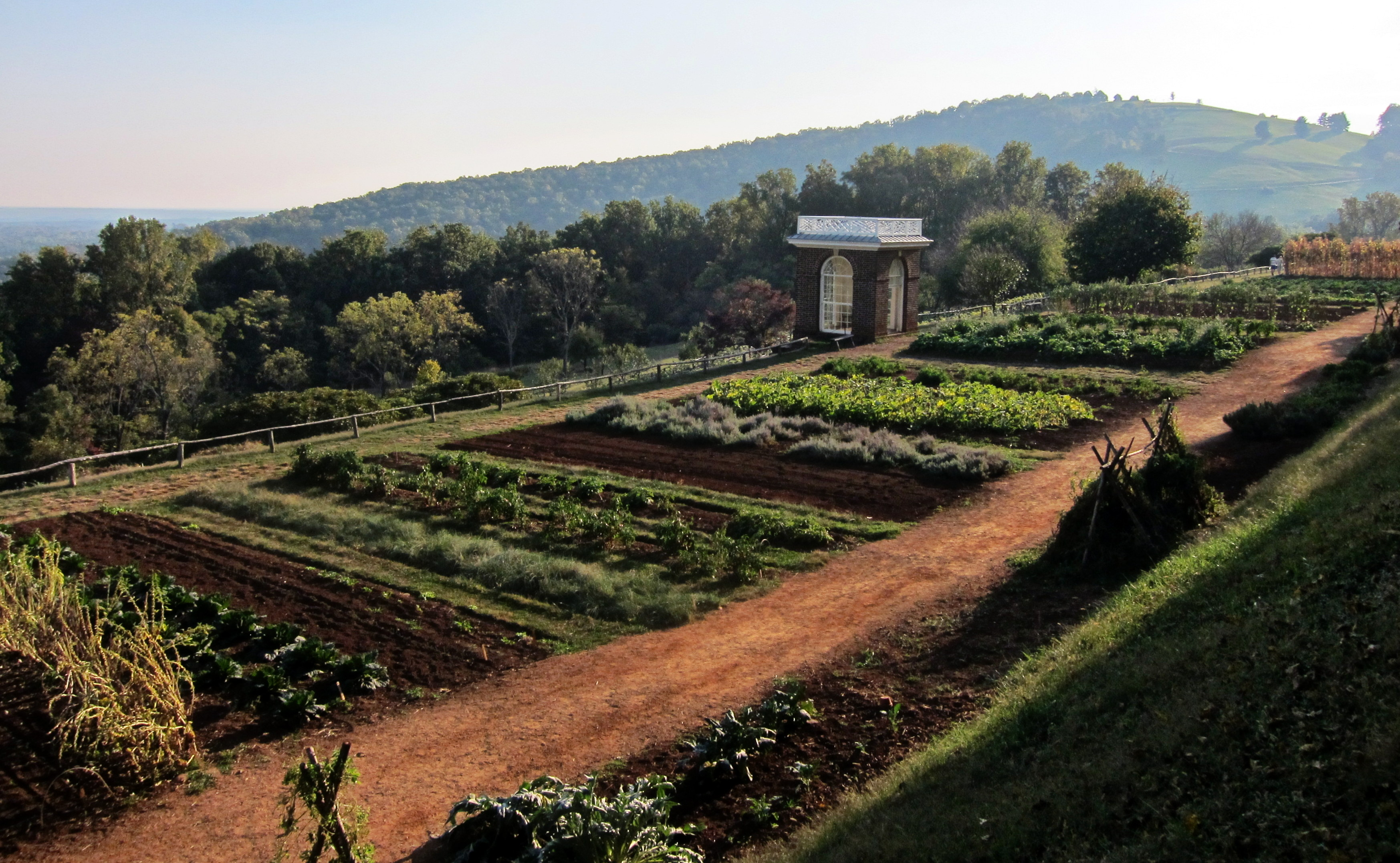
Vegetable garden at Monticello

Rogers was the overseer of the Belmont Plantation for John Harvie. He was also the overseer of Monticello beginning in 1791 and later of Shadwell. (Note: Jefferson corresponded with another man named John Rogers. There was another relative, John Rogers, who served during the Revolutionary War, and also a cousin of William Clark of the Lewis and Clark Expedition.)

=== Landowner and farmer ===
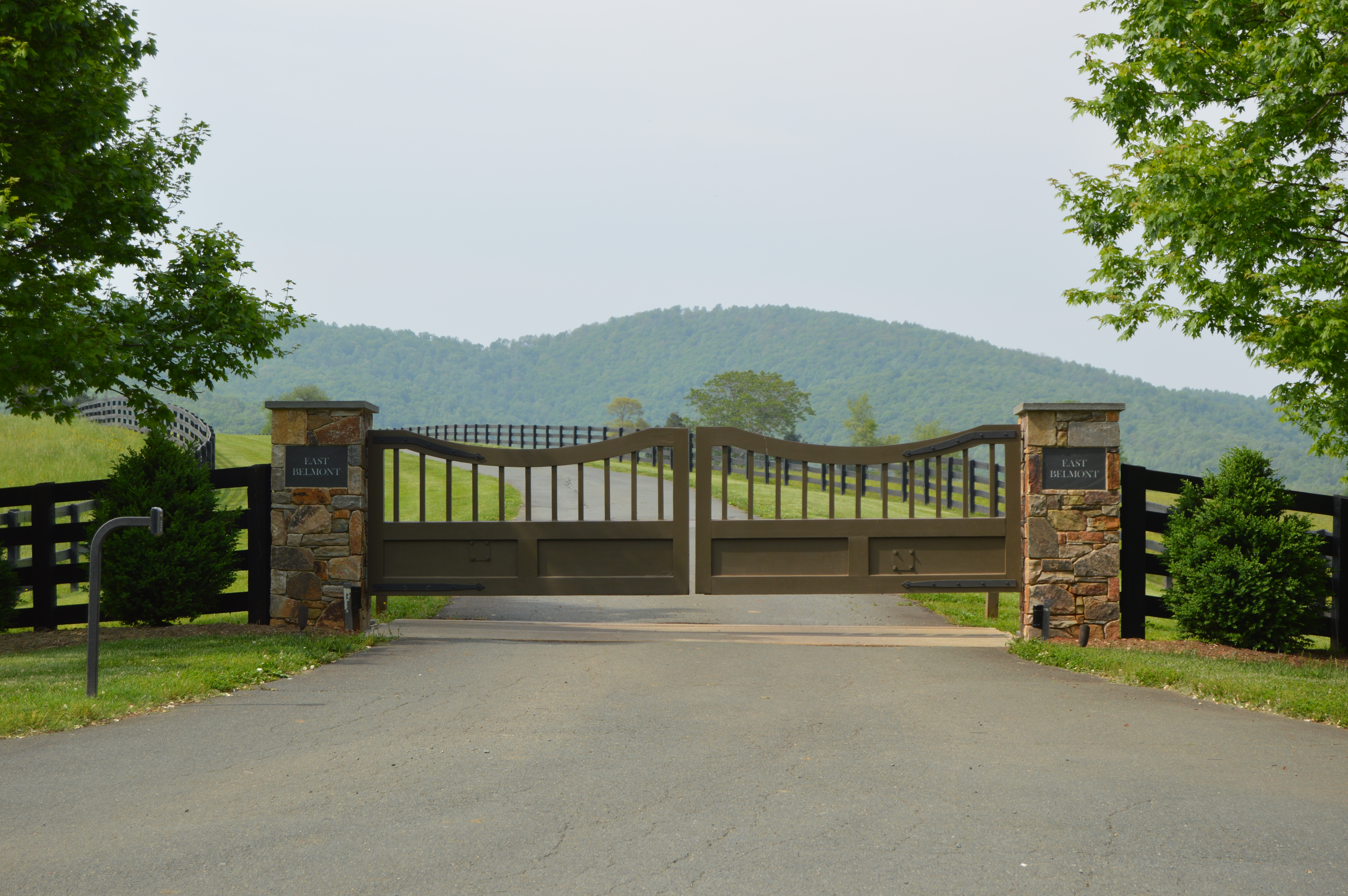
Gated entrance to East Belmont

Rogers purchased the Belmont estate in 1807, following the death of John Harvie. He sold about 636 acres of the estate to Dr. Charles Everett, splitting the property into Belmont Plantation and his portion that was named East Belmont. Around 1811, he built a Federal-style house, (Note: By 1835, the value of the residence doubled, so it is believed that Rogers initiated improvements to the house before his death. His son, John Jr., expanded the residence and added Flemish bond brickwork to the frame building. It was a good example of late Federalist architecture.) which sat on a 1,200-acre plantation. East Belmont had grist and saw mills and a warehouse (which were later destroyed during Sherman's March to the Sea of the American Civil War (1861–1865)).

When he moved onto East Belmont in 1811, most of the land was not suitable for cultivation. He developed a scheme for rotating crops of wheat, clover, and corn. In 1828, East Belmont won the first year of the Albemarle Agricultural Society's competition for "the best regulated plantation." (Note: Rogers was said to be "a farmer of more than ordinary merit" and that the farm "has been most judiciously managed as it regards profit, neatness, improvement of the soil (and) arrangement of the fields.") He was a slaveholder, whose farm was very profitable. He sold beef and corn to Thomas Jefferson. He produced whiskey, which he may have sold to Jefferson, too.

=== Agricultural reform ===
Rogers—along with Jefferson, James Madison, James Monroe, and Robert McCormick—was a founder of the Agricultural Society of Albemarle. Rogers was "in the forefront of the agricultural reform movement" of the early 19th century. He was known for his progressive approaches to agriculture, including methods for improving the quality of the soil after years of tobacco crops. Farm land in the area was also of poor quality due to vertical plowing and infrequent crop rotation.

In 1842, the Board of Agriculture stated that:

Many of us can recollect the aspects of the county, its fertile hills converted into barren wastes, abraded everywhere by impassible gullies.

Members were the leading planters in the area who shared ideas and experiences. They relinquished its dependency on tobacco, and began growing new crops, like grain and wheat. The society had a national presence and published the American Farmer.

Rogers communicated with other agricultural societies around the country and in Europe to glean and share information. He established the first agricultural fair in Albemarle County. Prizes were given to farmers and ranchers who engaged in soil conservation, had successful crops and home products, or improved breeds of horses and cattle. He was on several judging committees.

In 1818, Rogers was on a committee to "engage some suitable person to undertake the manufacture of modern agricultural implements". Other committees included erosion control measures, improved fertilizers and new methods of animal husbandry. He was known as "Farmer John", and was said to have the "best tilled farm in the county" by the society.

== Personal life ==
He married Susan Goodman, the daughter of Charles Goodman, and they had four children: John, Thornton, Mary and Janetta. His two daughters married brothers. Mary married Richard Sampson and Janette married John Price Sampson. John Jr., who married a Sampson woman, lived at East Belmont and was a prosperous and influential citizen of the area. Thornton was a Presbyterian minister, who built the South Plains Church. He was the minister of the church until his death. Thornton was given part of East Belmont, where he built the manor called Keswick. He married Margaret Hart.

He died in 1838. Mrs. Rogers married Edward Thurman of Tennessee. (Note: Benjamin Thurman was an early settler of Albemarle County, living at Hammock's Gap, north of South West Mountains beginning around 1732 or 1734.) Thurman ran the farm ably, using new farm implements, like the reaper.
