= John Harvie Sr. =

Scottish-born Virginia planter (1706–1767)

John Harvie
- Born: December 20, 1706; Gargunnock, Scotland
- Died: December 3, 1767 (aged 60); Keswick, Virginia
- Occupations: Planter and guardian of Thomas Jefferson

John Harvie, often called Colonel John Harvie (1706–1767), was raised in Stirlingshire, Scotland and immigrated to the Thirteen Colonies. He settled in Albemarle County, Virginia by 1735 and purchased Belmont that was a plantation near Shadwell and Keswick, Virginia. He had close relationships with his neighbors the Jeffersons and was the guardian of future president Thomas Jefferson for some years after Jefferson's father died.

== Early life ==
Harvie was born in Gargunnock, Stirlingshire, Scotland on December 20, 1706, son of John Harvie. The Acts of Union 1707, implemented the year following Harvie's birth, created the single Kingdom of Great Britain. England and Scotland had shared one ruler since 1603, but now their parliaments were merged. Although there was significant anti-English sentiment in Scotland at the turn of the 18th century, political leaders in Scotland sought to unite with England to improve their trade opportunities with English colonies, thus improving their poor economy. This was complicated, however, by the Jacobite uprisings that began in 1688 to restore James II and his descendants to the throne. Immediately after the Union, Scotland began to trade with the colonies. Tobacco was important to Virginia's economy, where it was grown, as well as to Scotland, where it was the major import from the colonies in the early and mid-18th century. Ships left the Chesapeake Bay for Scotland to deliver tobacco and returned with immigrants and goods for the colonists. In 1769, Virginia and Maryland received 83% of Scotland's exports.

== Planter ==
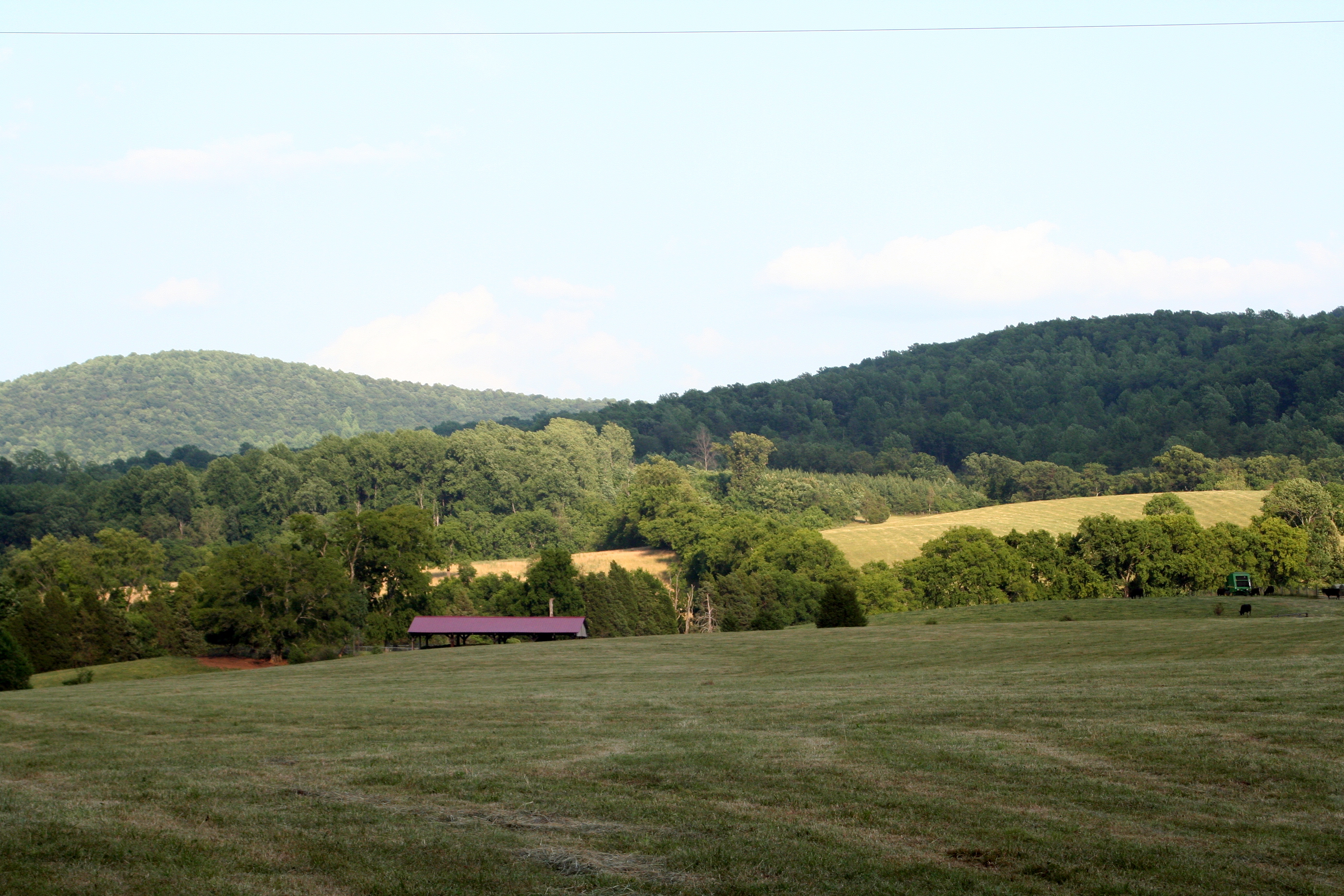
Southwest Mountains

He came to Albemarle County, Virginia around 1735 (around 40 years before the American Revolutionary War). He bought the Belmont, near Keswick and Shadwell, Virginia, from Matthew Graves in the 1730s. He was near the Rivanna River and had views of the South West Mountains to the north and the mountain that would become Monticello to the south.

Albemarle in the early 1700s was wilderness. People traveled on rough trails and transported tobacco to the marketplace along the Rivanna River. Wealthy planters, like Harvie, were set apart from common farmers by their fine furnishings and luxurious clothing. They consumed tea, coffee, sugar and wine. Another significant aspect of planters lives were their collections of books. When he died, Harvie had 189 books, as well as books that he had lent to neighbors and a number of French and Latin books.

Harvie was one of the founders of the Loyal Company of Virginia. John Lewis was the key founder. Others included Peter Jefferson, Thomas Walker, and Joshua Fry, who surveyed the land for the land grant and, like Harvie, also settled in Albemarle County. On July 12, 1748, a grant of 800,000 acres was made to the company. Harvie and Jefferson were early settlers of Albemarle and had already settled there by the time of this grant. Jefferson arrived in 1737 when there were only one or two other settlers. Harvie lived near Peter Jefferson and Dr. Thomas Walker of Castle Hill, places that Thomas Jefferson knew well.

== Thomas Jefferson's guardian ==
Harvie was a friend of Peter Jefferson and upon his death, Harvie became the "active executor" of Jefferson's estate and the guardian of Thomas Jefferson. (Note: John Nicholas, Dr. Thomas Walker, and Thomas Turpin were also named as executors. Records of Harvie's management of the estate are among the Special Collections Library at the University of Virginia.) He managed the household and family expenses from 1757, the year of Peter Jefferson's death, to 1765. The earliest known letter from Thomas was written to Harvie on February 14, 1760 from Shadwell. Thomas expressed an interest in attending College of William & Mary to "get a more universal Acquaintance." Jefferson was earnest in his belief that going away to school would allow him to more effectively focus on his education.

== Personal life ==
He married Martha Gaines (November 11, 1719–October 7, 1801), the daughter of Col. Daniel Gaines and related to Edmund Pendleton Gaines. They had the following children: Richard, John, Daniel, William, Martha, Elizabeth, Janet, and Mary. Harvie died in 1767.

John inherited Belmont and remained in Virginia. Martha, left with an unexceptional estate, ensured that her children had good educations and socialized with members of the "most polished society". In the 1780s, Martha and all of her children except John moved Wilkes County, Georgia. They lived two miles from the Broad River and on the eastern side of Long Creek.
