= Wilmington Township, Pennsylvania =

Wilmington Township is the name of two places in the U.S. state of Pennsylvania:

- Wilmington Township, Lawrence County, Pennsylvania
- Wilmington Township, Mercer County, Pennsylvania
