= Francis Jackson (kidnapping victim) =

Slave who worked in Virginia

Francis Jackson (born between 1815 and 1820), also known as Frank Jackson, was an African-American victim of kidnapping into slavery. He was born free, but enticed into helping to drive horses to Virginia, a slave state, and was sold into slavery in early 1851. Besides escaping a number of times over seven years, there were three legal cases fought in Virginia and North Carolina. It seemed to be settled with the Francis Jackson vs. John W. Deshazer case when he was ruled to be free in 1855, but he was held as a slave until 1858. Jackson lived a continual cycle of being sold to new slaveholders, running away, getting caught, and then being returned to his latest owner.

He was sold to as many as 12 slaveholders in Virginia, South Carolina, and ultimately in Moore County, North Carolina. An attorney, George Cameron Mendenhall, visited him in jail in North Carolina after he ran away from a nearby plantation. Believing Jackson's chain of events, Mendenhall filed legal proceedings that ultimately freed him in August 1858.

During the time that he was enslaved, abolitionists from Pennsylvania tried to track him down and provide legal evidence and depositions that he was free. Their attempts were thwarted for years. Legal certificates of freedom were ignored and he was moved, making it harder for him to be found. After he was freed, he returned to the New Castle, Pennsylvania area and was married by 1860. Despite an infirmity, he enlisted in the United States Colored Troops and was honorably discharged.

== Early life ==
Born between 1815 and 1820 in Mercer County, Pennsylvania, (Note: His year of birth may have been about 1815, 1816 or 1817, 1819 or 1820, or 1828.) Francis Jackson was the son of Elijah and Sarah, also known as Sally. At the time of his birth, both of his parents were free African Americans. Sarah was freed in 1813 when she was 28 years of age in accordance with the An Act for the Gradual Abolition of Slavery. Any children born after she attained her freedom were free as well. (Note: His maternal grandmother Peggy was an enslaved woman who was freed due to early American anti-slavery legislation, An Act for the Gradual Abolition of Slavery of 1780 in Pennsylvania. It was this legislation that freed Sarah at age 28.) Elijah and Sarah were married in 1815.

Jackson was the oldest of Sally and Elijah's four or five children. He lived in the New Castle, Pennsylvania area for years. He was raised by a farmer and an "ardent abolitionist", John Young, of Indian Run, north of New Castle. Young was a conductor on the Underground Railroad. Jackson lived in West Greenville, Pennsylvania (north of New Castle) by the time that he was kidnapped.

== Kidnapping ==
Charles May, a drover and horse trader, asked Jackson in early 1851 to help him drive horses to Baltimore, Maryland. (Note: According to his petition filed in October 1851, he may have been kidnapped between April and October 1850. A source says that he believed he was being hired to drive the horses to the state of Ohio between April and October 1850.) Fearing that he would be taken through Virginia, a slave state, Jackson did not consent until May promised that he would remain free.

=== Virginia ===
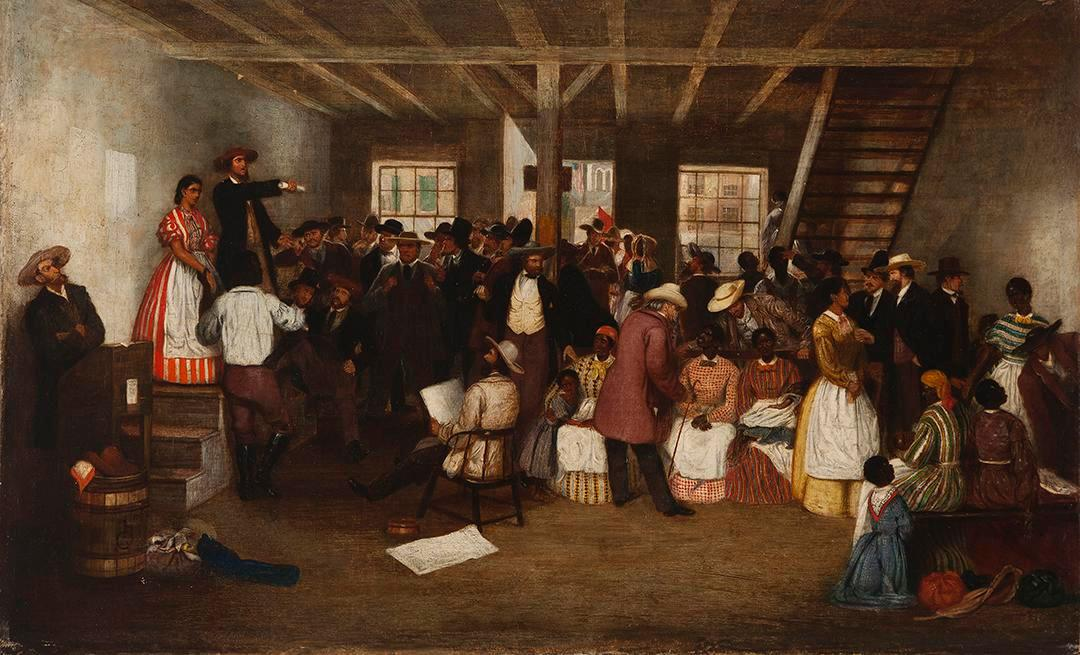
Lefevre James Cranstone, Slave Auction, Virginia, 1862

After the horses were delivered to Baltimore or Virginia, Jackson was put up for sale at a Richmond, Virginia slave auction by May. (Note: One source states that Jackson went to the site of a major slave market, Alexandria, with new acquaintances, and it was also said that he was sold at the Campbell County, Virginia courthouse, but it was found in Jackson's trial in 1858 that he was sold on an auction block in Richmond.) He was sold to Samuel Scott. (Note: The Liberator states that he was sold through an arrangement with Mr. Jones, a slaveholder. He escaped, but was found in a neighboring county and was arrested.) It was said that the transaction took place without Jackson's knowledge.

Rumors of Jackson's kidnapping reached New Castle soon after he left the state and had not returned when expected. William Stewart of Mercer County and Judge John Reynolds of New Castle attempted to bring Jackson back to Pennsylvania by providing proof that he was free. Jackson was in the Campbell County Courthouse before June 1851 when George C. Morgan attempted to provide papers that showed that Jackson was free. When he reached the courthouse, he was told that Jackson was not there; he had been sold to someone further south. In 1851 and 1852, the Free Presbyterian and The Anti-Slavery Bugle newspapers tracked his case and published information about his whereabouts.

Jackson took every chance he could to escape, particularly in the first nine months of servitude. In one incident, he was caught and taken to the Botetourt County, Virginia jail, in Fincastle. Behind the scenes, there were attempts to keep Jackson in slavery. One official "treacherously" ignored the certificates of his freedom sent to Fincastle and Jackson was moved to unknown locations.

Jackson was found to have been in Richmond at the Jones's Negro Jail by August 1851. He was visited by William John Clark, a slaveholder, who said in a letter to Judge Reynolds that he did not want to see anyone who was rightfully free being enslaved and for fifteen years had aided people who were wrongfully enslaved. Although the slaveholder was willing and able to offer assistance, Jackson was moved to a county jail a hundred miles away.

After Jackson was arrested in Botetourt County, he filed his first lawsuit against Scott, stating that he was illegally enslaved. It was filed on October 14, 1851, at the Superior Court of Law and Chancery in Campbell County. (Note: Jackson was in Campbell County in June 1852.) W.A. Glass, an attorney from the city, sought and received proof that he was a free man from New Castle and Mercer County, Pennsylvania. A witness from Virginia stated that Jackson had said he was previously enslaved by May's father and belonged to another slaveholder when he was sold to Scott. The case went to trial in October 1853 with depositions by three people who knew the Jacksons in Pennsylvania and stated that they were free. The depositions were taken of Judge Reynolds, James S. Cossett, and Henry Pearson. The case was dismissed and Jackson was transferred to John W. Deshazer. Jackson escaped and was found in New London and was taken to the jail in Campbell County. (Note: Deshazer's surname was also stated as Deshhazen.)

Since he was kidnapped, Jackson learned that the justice and legal system worked efficiently for slaveholders, and people who were wrongly enslaved had a very hard time being heard and proven free. The lawsuit Francis Jackson vs. John W. Deshazer was filed in Campbell County, Virginia claiming that Jackson's employment brought him to Richmond, Virginia, where he was kidnapped and sold into slavery. Benjamin Ferris took on his case and obtained affidavits from Pennsylvania, including Jackson's neighbors and Judge Reynolds who knew Jackson but they were not accepted for the case. An official from Campbell County said that he would only accept affidavits from people who were white.

Perhaps one of the most basic procedural deprivations that blacks, enslaved and free, suffered was their preclusion from testifying against whites and, during certain periods, from testifying against other blacks, mulattoes, and Indians. With one stroke of the pen, the slave was denied the right to be heard, to call witnesses on his behalf, and to confront the witnesses against him.

— A. Leon Higginbotham Jr. and Anne F. Jacobs

Ferris found acceptable witnesses from Pennsylvania who attested that Jackson and his parents were free. Deshazer had one witness, Lewis E. Williams, who recounted the sales to Scott and then Deshazer. Before the case was settled, Jackson escaped. The judge discontinued Jackson's case without prejudice, meaning that if Jackson was later found to be enslaved, the case could be tried based on the evidence provided in this case.

Francis Jackson, "a coloured man ... represents that he is free and has been so from his birth, that he was decoyed into this state some twelve or eighteen months ago by one ... May from the state of Pennsylvania." Jackson reveals that "he was sold by the said May as a slave, and bought by one samuel M. Scott," who sold him to John W. Deshazor, "who now holds him in slavery unlawfully." Noting that "he is prosecuting a suit for his freedom in the county of Botetourt in this state," the petitioner "prays your Honor to award an Injunction to [restrain] the said John W. Deshazor from conveying him away and to require the said Deshazor to give bond and security for the forthcoming of your Orator to await the determination of the suit aforesaid."

— Abstract of petition, Francis Jackson

Around October 1855, the Francis Jackson vs. John W. Deshazer case was finalized and Jackson was declared free.

=== Intervening years ===
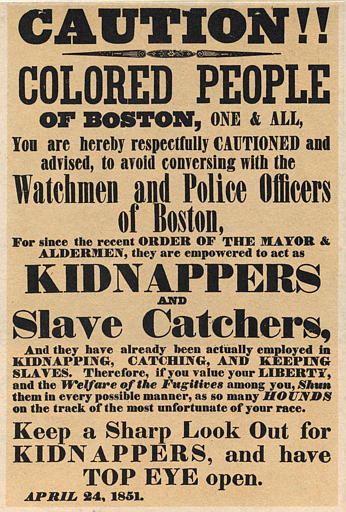
Slave kidnapping post, 1851, Boston after the passage of the Fugitive Slave Act of 1850

Over several years, Jackson had a continuous cycle where he would escape, get captured and jailed, and then returned to a slaveholder. He had ten to twelve slaveholders in Virginia, South Carolina, and North Carolina. (Note: He may have been sold so many times because slaveholders did not like to hold on to people who were born free.)

=== North Carolina ===
Jackson was taken south, just over the Virginia state line into North Carolina. He was sold as a slave to a planter there. While in jail for escaping, Jackson had the occasion to talk with George Cameron Mendenhall—a Quaker, a slaveholder, and an attorney. Jackson explained what had happened to him since he lived in Pennsylvania. Mendenhall believed him and wrote letters to people that Jackson knew in Mercer County and told them of Jackson's whereabouts.

After it was determined how to find Jackson, people in Pennsylvania planned for his release and started a fund for expenses. The Governor of North Carolina was asked by Pennsylvania's leader to return Jackson to New Castle. Having learned that North Carolina's governor agreed to Jackson's release, George C. Morgan traveled south. He had a letter of introduction for Mendenhall, a neighbor of Jackson's slaveholder.

In the meantime, Jackson was in jail, having run away from Frederick W. Swann's plantation in Moore County, North Carolina. Mendenhall started legal proceedings to prove Jackson was born free. He also got him out of jail and bought him new clothes. Mendenhall took Jackson to his home, but Swann got word of the arrangements, found him, and took him back to his plantation. Swann was a farmer with 17 slaves in 1860.

When Morgan made it to Swann's plantation, he saw Jackson and was able to point him out by a limp he had when he walked. Jackson identified Morgan as a tailor from New Castle.

Mendenhall had filed a legal suit for $1,500 (equivalent to $55,817 in 2025) in damages for having been unlawfully enslaved. The trial began on August 23, 1858. After hearing the evidence of the depositions, the witness statement by George C. Morgan, and statements by others, the jury quickly found that Jackson was born free.

Morgan and Jackson then returned to Pennsylvania on a train, passing through Philadelphia, in September 1858. They returned to New Castle, where his parents still lived.

== Later years ==
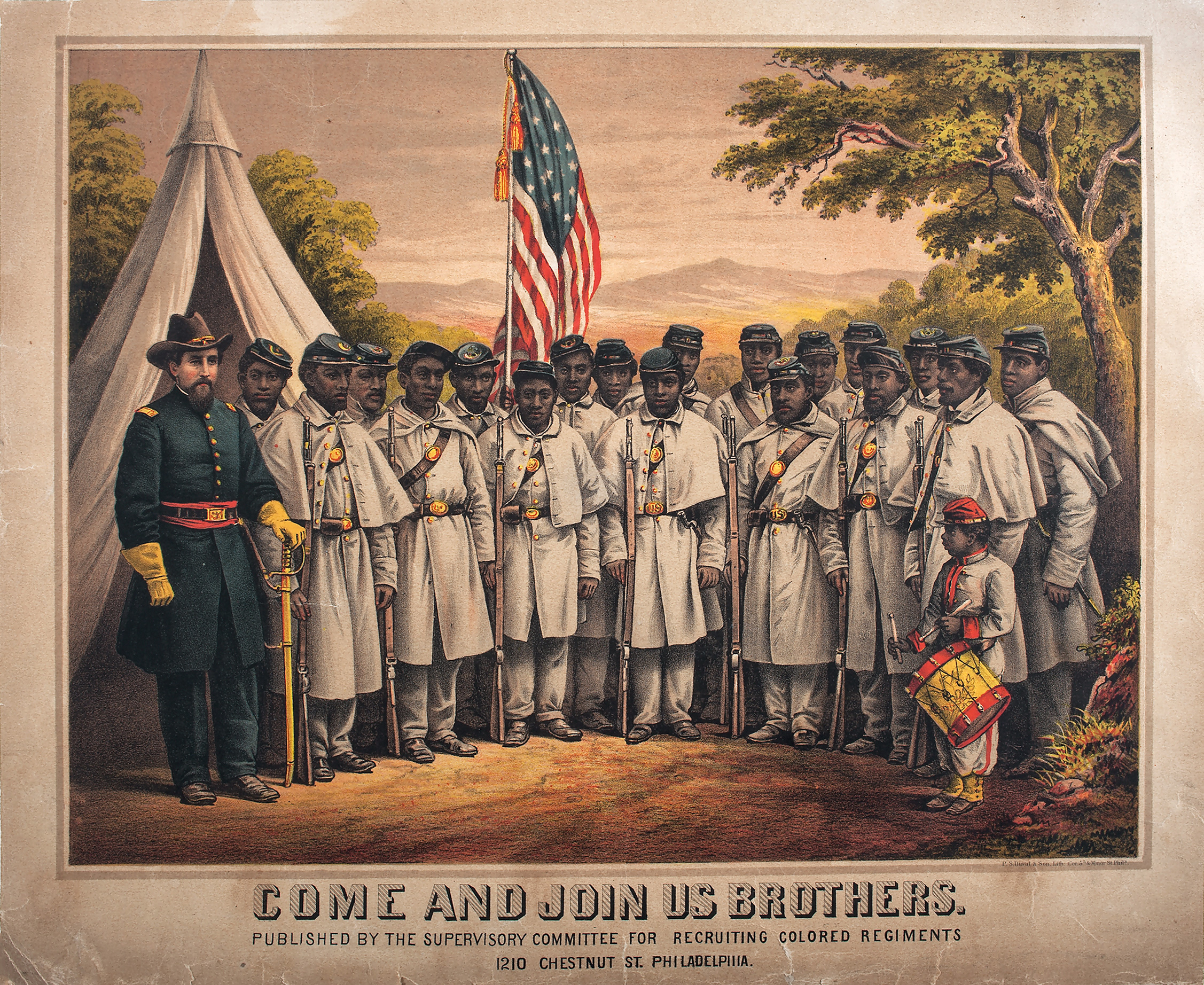
United States Colored Troops recruiting poster. A group of about 20 black recruits and a white officer stand before a flying United States flag and Union tent

According to The History of Lawrence County, Pennsylvania, Jackson returned to New Castle. Jackson lived in Allegheny City, Pennsylvania in 1860 with his wife Susan. He supported his family as a laborer. He enlisted in the Union Army during the American Civil War and was honorably discharged. (Note: There were a number of Frank and Francis Jacksons who enlisted in the United States Colored Troops during the Civil War.)
