= Charles Everett (planter) =

American planter and politician

Dr. Charles Everett, his surname was also spelled Everette and Everard, (ca. 1767–1848) was an American medical doctor and planter from Albemarle County, Virginia. He was a physician to three American presidents, Thomas Jefferson, James Monroe, and James Madison. He was also a private secretary to Monroe. He served twice in the Virginia House of Delegates in the 1810s. He purchased land from Jefferson that had been part of the Shadwell tract that became known as Everettsville. He lived his mid- and later-years on the Belmont Plantation. He owned slaves in the 1800s, and later decided that slavery was a sin. He freed them and his will stipulated creation of a community Pandenarium for them in Pennsylvania, a free state.

== Personal life and education ==
Everett was born around 1767. (Note: John Everett was the first Everett recorded to have lived in Albemarle County. He lived along Moore's Creek until 1788. He then lived in what he called Pleasant Grove, where he tried to establish a town there and ran a tavern. John Everett had a house at nearby Red Hill (about 7 miles southwest of Charlotteville). He moved to Cabell County in 1807.) He studied medicine at the University of Pennsylvania and graduated in 1795. (Note: One source states that he graduated in 1796, but the university states that he graduated in 1795.) He was then a physician in Albemarle County, Virginia.

Everett remained a bachelor throughout his life. His friends included James Madison, James Monroe, Hugh Nelson, Bishop Madison, Benjamin Rush, Francis Walker, Alexander Stevenson, John C. Calhoun, and Governor Nicholas. Edward Coles, in the same social circle as Everett, set his slaves free in 1819.

Everett's reputation ranged from being a "cruel tutor", well-respected, and kind-hearted. He is known for being cautious of romance and business arrangements.

== Medical doctor ==
Martha Jefferson Randolph to Thomas Jefferson

1805 February 28. I was for one night and part of the next very ill, and having what I never in my life had before thought myself dying whilst in it. Doctor Everett says it is not uncommon in the complaint I had, which was brought on by cold in the first instance."

He practiced medicine in Charlottesville, Virginia by 1804. He knew Thomas Jefferson and attended to him when he was on his death bed. He was Thomas Jefferson's family physician, was President James Monroe's physician, and also attended to James Madison. He consulted on the condition of Bishop Monroe and he cared for patients across seven counties. Many men studied the medical practice under Everett. He was said to be "fifty years ahead of his time in scientific thought and vision" by the American Historical Society.

He had a medical office in its own building at LaFourche, his residence, which is said to have been owned previously by a man from Louisiana. It was named for Lafourche Parish, Louisiana, his home parish.

Thomas Jefferson’s "most admired friends" included physicians, but he also expressed his consternation of physicians to Everett. Jefferson said "whenever he saw three physicians together he looked to see if there were buzzards in the neighborhood."

== Landowner and planter ==
=== Charlottesville ===
Everett purchased a lot on High Street in Charlottesville, Virginia in 1804 and two more lots in 1806 that were across the street from his first lot. He established a medical office and had his stables on the two lots. He sold these lots in 1814.

=== Belmont - Everettsville ===
Beginning in 1804, he lived at a mansion called LaFourche that was near Shadwell at the intersection of Routes 730 and 731, formerly Three Notched and Fredericksburg Roads, in Keswick. (Note: Before that, about 1750 to 1789, it was the Old Everettsville Tavern. It had stables, a post office, and a store. During the American Revolutionary War, British General Tarleton had come to Albemarle County to raid Thomas Jefferson's residence. Someone delayed serving him breakfast, which allowed time for Jefferson to escape Monticello.)

In 1811, he purchased a 1,200-acre portion of the Belmont estate, which included a residence, from John Rogers. The other portion of the land, owned by Rogers, is called East Belmont. Everett moved to Belmont, seven miles east of Charlottesville, in 1813. In 1821, Everett had a total of more than 1,000 acres after purchasing a 400-acre tract called Pouncey's from Thomas Jefferson. It was part of the Shadwell tract. The area was also known as Everettsville. Everett lived at Belmont until his death.

== Politician ==
He was a magistrate in 1807. He was then a member of the House of Delegates (1813-1814, 1819-1820), and he was involved in public affairs and politics within Virginia. He was Monroe's personal secretary in 1817; and he was appointed again as the president's private secretary in 1822. They remained close and corresponded until Monroe's death. (Note: Boxes of correspondence between Monroe and Everett are among Monroe's papers at the University of Virginia.)

== Pandenarium ==
He began planning in 1837 to free his slaves and provide a community for them. His nephew, Dr. Cutlip Everett, a physician from Philadelphia, led the effort. Dr. Charles Everett died in 1848. Everett emancipated all of the slaves on his plantation through his will. He purchased land in Pennsylvania to establish a community called Pandenarium. Local abolitionists assisted in the project to establish 24 furnished homes set on two acre lots, orchards, wells, and graded roads. A group of 63 people traveled from Virginia and arrived in Mercer County, Pennsylvania in 1854.

== Death ==
Everett died in 1848. Besides the stipulations in the will for the community that would become Pandenarium, the rest of the estate went to Dr. Charles D. Everett, his nephew.
