= Pantops =

Pantops may refer to:

- Pantops, Virginia, a census-designated place in Albemarle County, Virginia
- Pantops Academy, a school in Charlottesville, Virginia
- Pantops Mountain, a mountain in Charlottesville, Virginia
