= Clifton (Shadwell, Virginia) =

Historic house in Virginia, United States

- U.S. National Register of Historic Places
- Virginia Landmarks Register
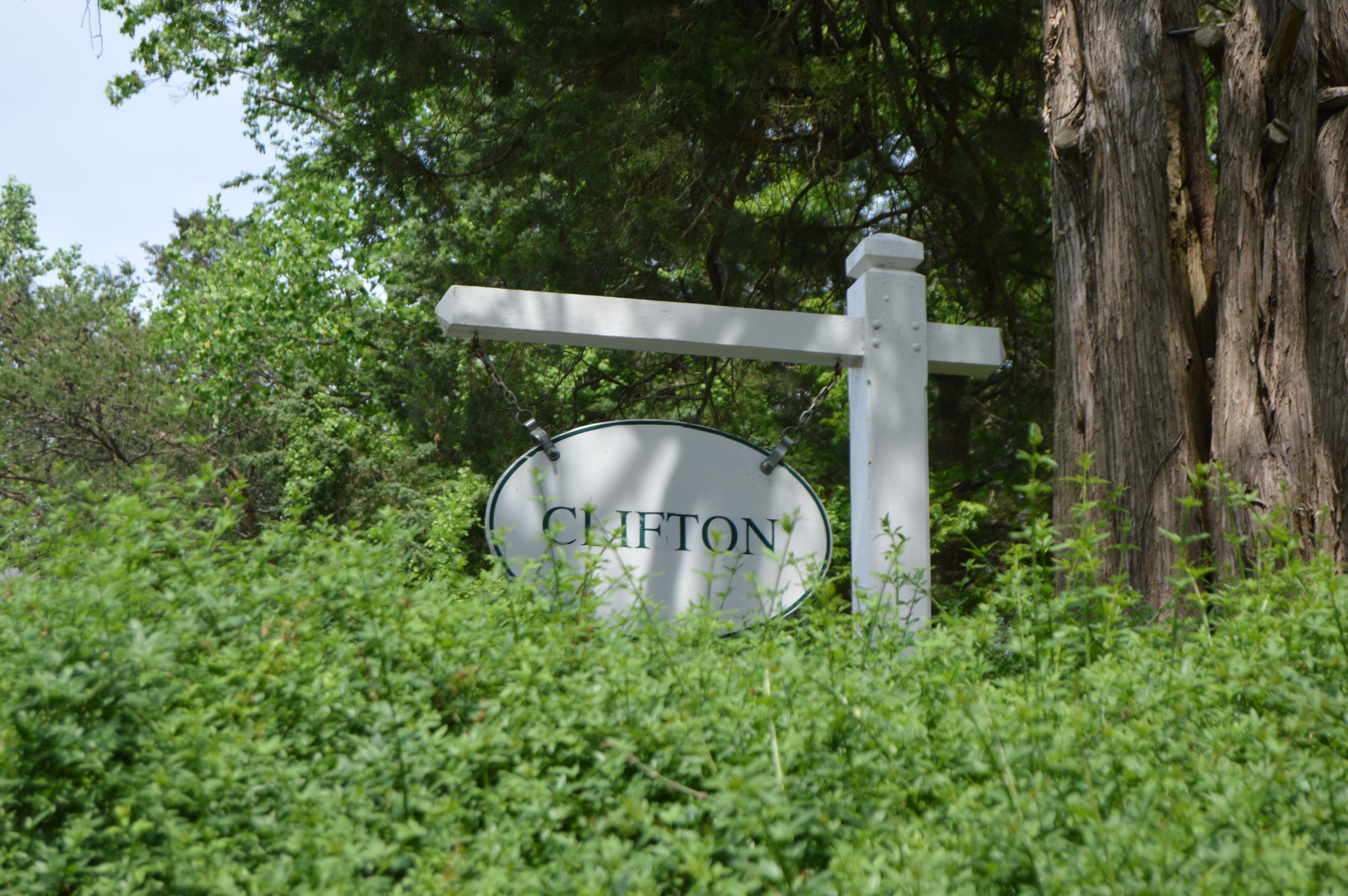
- Sign at the entrance

- Location within Virginia Location within the United States
- Location: VA 729 at the Rivanna River, near Shadwell, Virginia
- Coordinates: 38°0′25″N 78°23′51″W
- Area: 739 acres (299 ha)
- Built: c. 1800
- Architectural style: Colonial Revival, Federal
- NRHP reference No.: 89001922
- VLR No.: 002-0155

Significant dates
- Added to NRHP: November 2, 1989
- Designated VLR: June 21, 1988

Clifton is a historic home located near Shadwell, Albemarle County, Virginia. It was built about 1800, and is a large, rambling two-story, five-bay, wood frame dwelling. The house has later 19th- and 20th-century Colonial Revival-style additions and alterations. The front facade features a double level porch, added about 1930, and the interior has Federal details. Also on the property are the contributing brick office (c. 1833–1845); the ruins of an early 19th-century spring house; the shaft of a 19th-century stone-lined ice house; an early 20th-century chicken coop and an altered 1920s brick garage.

Clifton was built by Congressman and Virginia Governor Thomas Mann Randolph, Jr. (1768–1828), who was married to Martha Jefferson, the daughter of President Thomas Jefferson. It was part of the never-to-be port of North Milton, a sister port to the now extinct village of Milton directly across the Rivanna River. With his partners, Randolph planned North Milton to support commercial and agricultural development, situated along the Milton Canal of the Rivanna River. The Clifton house first began as a warehouse and Randolph had a separate office building, which is still on the Clifton grounds. The house was expanded later and during the 19th century it had a one-story veranda, which has been replaced by the portico. Situated on 100 acres, it has operated as an inn since 1983. It was added to the National Register of Historic Places in 1989.
