= Lewis Harvie =

American lawyer and politician (1782–1807)

Member of the Virginia Governor's Council
- In office December 6, 1806 – April 14, 1807
- Preceded by: William Foushee
- Succeeded by: George William Smith

Member of the Virginia House of Delegates
- In office December 7, 1805 – December 6, 1806
- Preceded by: John Adams
- Succeeded by: John Foushee

Private Secretary to the President
- In office June 1803 – March 1804
- President: Thomas Jefferson
- Preceded by: Meriwether Lewis
- Succeeded by: William A. Burwell

Personal details
- Born: 1782 Virginia, U.S.
- Died: April 14, 1807 (aged 25)
- Relations: John Harvie (father)
- Profession: Politician, attorney

Lewis Harvie (1782 – April 14, 1807) was a nineteenth-century Virginia lawyer and politician who served as Private Secretary to President Thomas Jefferson, member of the Virginia House of Delegates, and member of the Virginia Council of State.

== Early life and education ==
Harvie was born in Virginia in 1782, the eldest son of John Harvie, delegate to the Second Continental Congress and signer of the Articles of Confederation. He attended the College of William & Mary in 1798 and received private instruction in law from John Mason.

== Career ==
In 1803, President Jefferson wrote a letter to Harvie offering him a position as a secretary and aide-de-camp. The letter outlined that his responsibilities would include managing visitors, running errands, delivering messages to Congress, and representing the President in meetings.

On June 6, 1803, at the age of 21, Harvie became the private secretary to President Thomas Jefferson, succeeding Meriwether Lewis. He served in the role until March 1804. He was a frequent guest of Jefferson at dinner.

After serving as private secretary, Harvie established a private law practice in Richmond, Virginia, where he practiced property and estate law, including assisting Jefferson in the sale of the Richmond estate of Filippo Mazzei.

In 1805, Harvie was elected to represent Richmond in the Virginia House of Delegates at the age of 23. He earned a reputation as a compelling orator. He was re-elected in 1806, but resigned the seat the same year after he was elected to the Virginia Governor's Council. In January 1807, Harvie also became a member of the board of trustees of the Hallerian academy of Virginia and a trustee of the Academy for Female Education.

Harvie continued to remain associated with Jefferson until his death, and a February 1807 correspondence between them (two months before his death) is in the collection of the Library of Congress.

== Death ==
Harvie died of a "lingering illness" on April 14, 1807, aged 25.
