= Indian Run, Mercer County, Pennsylvania =

Unincorporated community in Pennsylvania, US

Coordinates: 41°9′4.21″N 80°15′51.23″W

Indian Run is a populated place in Wilmington Township of Mercer County, Pennsylvania, named for the stream Indian Run. Indian Run had a reputation as a "safe haven" for African Americans, whether they were free or escaping slavery. Abolitionists who broke away from a New Wilmington church established the White Chapel Church. In the 1840s, a settlement was created for freedmen called Pandenarium. John Young and others were prominent Underground Railroad conductors.

== Early days ==
John Young Sr. settled in Mercer County in 1804, bringing his wife Elizabeth Elder Young and children William, Jane, Mary, Hannah, Isabel, Margaret, Elizabeth, John, and David from Cumberland County, Pennsylvania. With him was one of the few enslaved people to live in Mercer County, Margaret Johnston, known as Peggy (1763–1854). She had two children, Sallie and Robert Johnson, that were born in Mercer County. In his will of 1825, Young asked that Peg be supported by the farm, which he left to his sons John and David. Under the An Act for the Gradual Abolition of Slavery (1780), her children would be free at age 28.

== White Chapel Church and Cemetery ==
In 1907, the White Chapel Church was built on Mercer–New Castle Road. The land was purchased for one dollar from Eugene Blake. The church was founded in 1842 when some of the members of the Neshannock Presbyterian Church in New Wilmington broke away from the church over disagreements about slavery. Indian Run was particularly known for its ardent abolitionists. John Young led the group; he had the first church built across from the White Chapel Cemetery on a plot of his land or land supplied by James Minich. The church was dedicated as a place to speak out against slavery. It was named for Joseph White who delivered runaways from New Castle, where he lived, to John Young at Indian Run.

== Underground Railroad ==
It was also a station for the Underground Railroad in the mid-1800s. John and his son David Young were conductors at Indian Run, and they would sometimes transport runaway slaves between their houses to avoid slave catchers, having been warned by his neighbors that slave catchers were in the area and where they were headed. He worked in concert with his niece Elizabeth Stewart Kilgore, whose residence, also an Underground Railroad station, was six miles away. Neighbors of the Youngs, James and his son John Minick were also conductors.

Neighboring stops in Brookfield, Ohio and Jamestown and Mercer, Pennsylvania were part of the well-traveled route through Western Pennsylvania to Canada. Fugitives were also taken from Indian Run to Sheakleyville and then to Ashtabula, Ohio, where they were taken by boat to Canada. People searching for runaway slaves, like slave catchers and enslavers, monitored the route between New Castle and Ashtabula. John Young transported people across the lake to Canada several times.

Hundreds of formerly enslaved people traveled through these stations to attain their freedom. They spent their nights traveling, often under stage coaches or in piles of hay in wagons, and hid during the daytime. For instance, some people were hidden in secret compartments in a house's crawl space. Stops were generally spaced the distance for a horse to travel at night. The Underground Railroad activities became more dangerous with the passage of the Fugitive Slave Law of 1850.

== Pandenarium ==
Pandenarium, believed to mean "a fertile and plowed plateau", was a settlement established just for freed African American men, women, and children. It was established by Dr. Charles Everett, a plantation owner and physician from Virginia. He was an enslaver who also believed that slavery was sinful. He began freeing his slaves in 1837, and they stayed on his plantation, where they were paid for their work. Everett died in 1848, and he provided for a new future for his freed slaves in his will. He left them each $1,000 (equivalent to $37,212 in 2025), which was used to buy the freedom of spouses and other family members who were scattered away from Everett's plantation: Nancy Bell bought her husband Dan. His nephew, Dr. Charles D. Everett, bought 50 acres in Indian Run for the settlement, from which people were given two-acre plots of land. Construction began about 1849 for what was to be a community with a stagecoach stop, stores, and a church. By 1854, there were 24 two-story houses with gardens, wells, and graded roads. Clothing, farming implements, and furniture were provided as well. A Baptist church was constructed for the community.

Sixty-three formerly enslaved people arrived with their families—including George Washington Lewis and John and Rosie Allen—on November 12, 1854. (Note: Dye states that 52 people arrived on November 12, 1854, which was the number of the people who came from Everett's plantation.) They traveled by train from Keswick, east of Charlottesville and near the plantation at Shadwell. At New Brighton, they traveled on packet boats along the Pennsylvania Canal. Abolitionists met them at New Castle and transported them to Indian Run. George Washington Lewis, his wife Caroline, and daughter Emma lived at Pendenarium. Rather than living in the houses built by abolitionists, residents built shacks along the Indian Run Creek. They moved into the houses after a flood of Shenango River ruined their shacks. In 1855, the Pennsylvania General Assembly recognized Pandenarium with Act number 324. The act was established to "authorize and empower the Court of Common Pleas of Mercer county to legitimate certain persons who were emancipated by the last will and testament of Dr. C.D. Everett, late of Albemarle county, Virginia." It listed the names of the people who were emancipated by Everett's will and others who were explicitly identified to prevent them from being kidnapped back into slavery. The settlement grew to 100 acres.

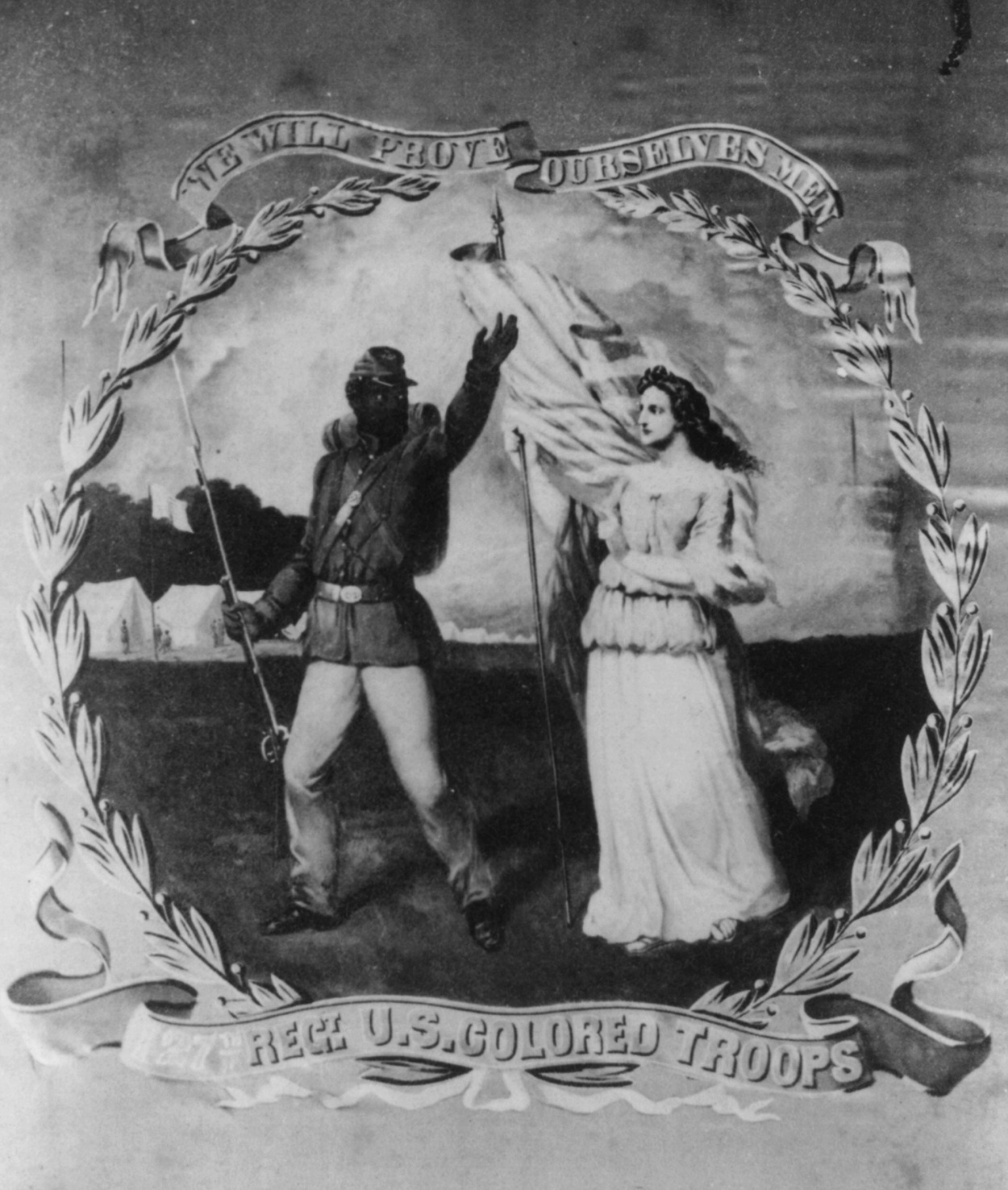
127th United States Colored Infantry Regiment flag of the depicting African American soldiers standing next to Columbia holding a flag. The message is: We will prove ourselves men. Designed by David Bustill Bowser

During the 19th century, newspaper stories focused on how life was difficult in the community. People died of pneumonia, bronchitis, and tuberculosis. The residents were not accustomed to the winters. The creek Indian Run, or Shenango River, caused damage when it overflowed. They suffered financial losses from people who took advantage of them. Unfriendly neighbors wrongfully accused residents and went on rides in the night to scare them. Archaeologist Angela Jaillet-Wentling found, though, that although they had some difficulties, the community members flourished from 1854 into the 1930s.

Many people moved to nearby towns. George Washington Lewis (c1836 – 1916) served in the 127th United States Colored Infantry Regiment during the Civil War. There were residents there until the 1930s, when six members of the Robinson family were on the federal census.

=== Archaeological study ===
In 2009, a local archaeologist, Angela Jaillet-Wentling, began conducting an archaeological study at Pandenarium. The site for the excavation included the Allen family residence, which had housed several generations.

Whatever the situation of African Americans, whether they lived in bondage or freedom, archaeology has the power to shed light on their experiences.

— James A. Delle, The Archaeology of Northern Slavery and Freedom

The initial town layout was made according to local abolitionists' mindset for a northern rural village. It evolved over time to more closely resemble quarters for enslaved laborers on Mulberry Row at Monticello and the town of Hadley in Mercer County, Pennsylvania. (Note: At the start of the analysis of the site, Pandenarium was compared to slave quarters at Mulberry Row at Monticello and the Belmont Plantation in Albemarle County, Virginia, as well as two towns in Mercer County, Pennsylvania, Hadley, and Mercer.) Archaeology helps explain how people lived their daily lives, based upon what has been left behind. Houses were initially settled along a single interior road of the community, but African Americans established residences near main roads and a stream. John Allen's blacksmith shop remained alongside the stream, even after seasonal flooding of the early years in Pandenarium, which had resulted in new houses being set at a higher elevation and a little further back from the stream. Bob and Lizzie Allen raised their biracial children, the third generation of residents, near both Pandenarium and residences of European Americans. The archaeological remains from around 1874 to 1896 showed an interest in education, toys that they played with, how they wore their hair based upon found hair ornaments, and the types of clothes that they wore. Toy tea sets used by the Allens' children were like those of their neighbors, but tended to be colorful and decorative, like those found at Mulberry Row. Evidence also showed that families lived at Pendenarium for multiple generations and that the community changed to suit their lives best. Census data told of their education levels, ethnicity, and ages. It also identified who owned their own land.

== Historical marker ==
A historical marker was dedicated in November 2019 at the Helen Black Miller Memorial Chapel in Mercer of the Mercer County Historical Society. It was erected on the west side of U.S. Route 19 near the Iron Bridge Inn. Nearby, there was a community called Liberia that was established for people who escaped slavery.
