= Everettsville, Virginia =

Unincorporated community in Virginia, United States

Everettsville
- Unincorporated community
- Location within the Commonwealth of Virginia Everettsville (the United States)
- Coordinates: 38°00′49″N 78°22′28″W
- Country: United States
- State: Virginia
- County: Albemarle
- Time zone: UTC−5 (Eastern (EST))
  - Summer (DST): UTC−4 (EDT)
- GNIS feature ID: 1675248

Everettsville is an unincorporated community in Albemarle County, Virginia, United States. It was named for Dr. Charles Everett, who in 1821 bought the 400-acre tract called Pouncey's of the Shadwell tract from Thomas Jefferson. He more than doubled his property to more than 1,000 acres. The area became known as Everettsville.

In the mid-19th century, it was a point along the stagecoach route between Richmond and Staunton. Nicholas Trist's wife and children briefly took up residence here in early 1829 as they awaited word to follow Trist to Washington.
