= Limestone (Keswick, Virginia) =

Historic house in Virginia, United States

- U.S. National Register of Historic Places
- Virginia Landmarks Register
- The Monroe Law Office

- Location within Virginia Location within the United States
- Location: U.S. Route 250, near Keswick, Virginia
- Coordinates: 37°51′38″N 78°31′54″W
- Area: 338 acres (137 ha)
- Built: c. 1840
- Built by: Robert Sharp, Jr., et al.
- Architectural style: Colonial, Greek Revival
- NRHP reference No.: 06000366
- VLR No.: 002-0090

Significant dates
- Added to NRHP: May 10, 2006
- Designated VLR: March 8, 2006

Limestone, also known as Limestone Plantation and Limestone Farm, has two historic homes and a farm complex located near Keswick, Albemarle County, Virginia. The main dwelling at Limestone Farm consists of a long, narrow two-story central section flanked by two wings. the main section was built about 1840, and the wings appear to be two small late-18th-century dwellings that were incorporated into the larger building. It features a two-story porch. The house underwent another major renovation in the 1920s, when Colonial Revival-style detailing was added. The second dwelling is the Robert Sharp House, also known as the Monroe Law Office. It was built in 1794, and is a 2 1/2-story, brick and frame structure measuring 18 feet by 24 feet. Also on the property are a contributing shed (garage), corncrib (c. 1910), cemetery, a portion of a historic roadway, and a lime kiln known as "Jefferson's Limestone Kiln" (1760s). Limestone's owner in the late-18th century, Robert Sharp, was a neighbor and acquaintance of Thomas Jefferson. The property was purchased by James Monroe in 1816, after the death of Robert Sharp in 1808, and he put his brother Andrew Monroe in charge of its administration. The property was sold at auction in 1828.

It was added to the National Register of Historic Places in 2006.
