= Pantops Mountain =

Mountain in Virginia, United States

Coordinates: 38°1′34.8″N 78°26′32.7″W

Pantops Mountain is an area of Albemarle County, Virginia, located directly east of Charlottesville across the Rivanna River. and north of U.S. Route 250. in the Southwest Mountains range. It has long been known as Pantops Mountain locally. However, there is no USGS designation under this name.

In 1777, Thomas Jefferson purchased some of the land for use as a farm. According to Edward C. Mead, "Pantops--formerly written 'Pant-Ops'--was therefore, so named by Mr. Jefferson from two Greek words...meaning 'all-seeing,' significant of the extended view from its summit."
