= East Belmont =

- U.S. National Register of Historic Places
- U.S. Historic district
- Virginia Landmarks Register
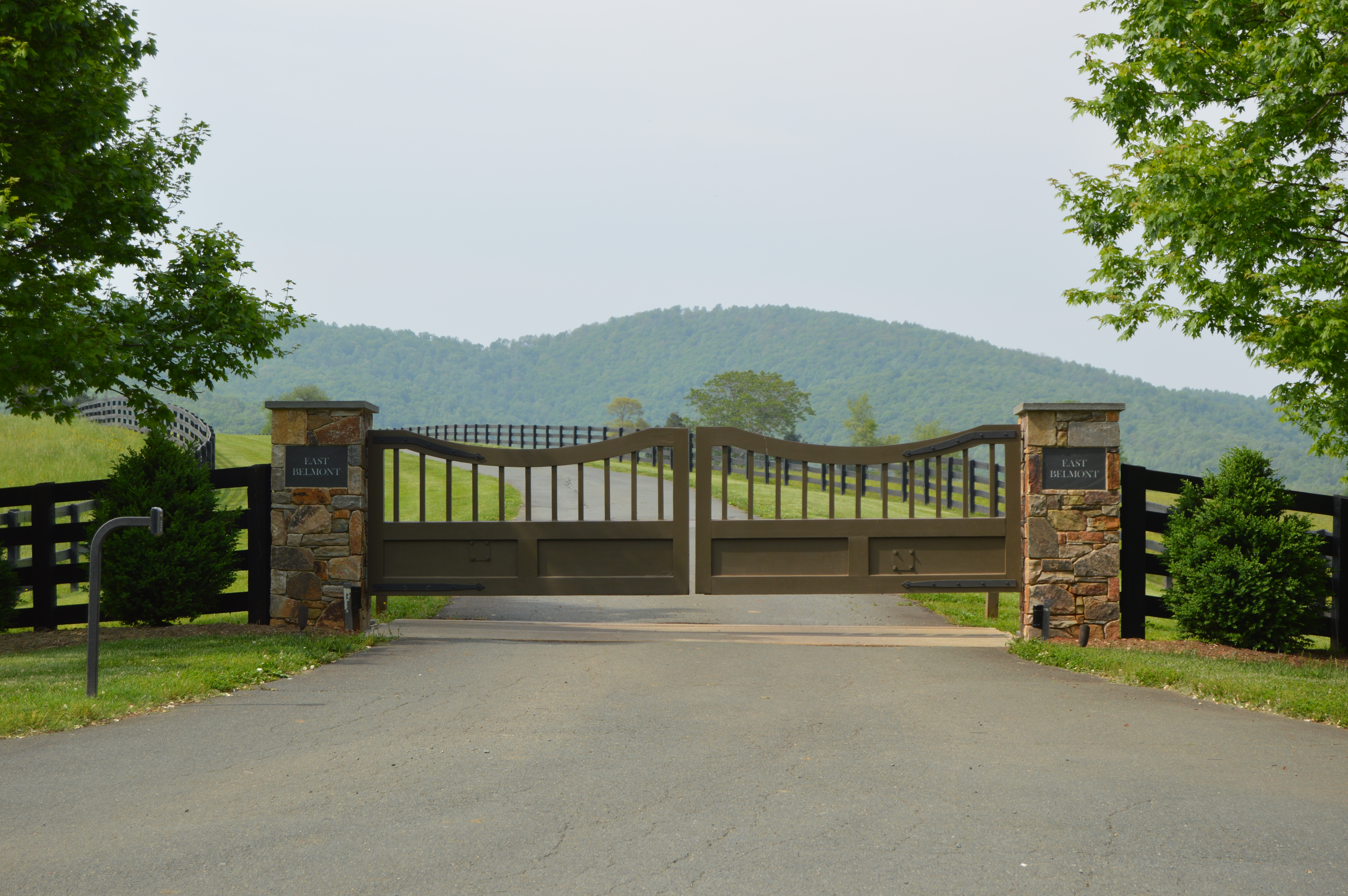
- Entrance to the estate

- Location within Virginia Location within the United States
- Location: Junction of State Route 22 and Black Cat Road, near Keswick, Virginia
- Coordinates: 38°01′53″N 78°21′53″W
- Area: 281.3 acres (113.8 ha)
- Built: 1811-1813, 1834
- Built by: Lewis Level
- Architectural style: Federal
- NRHP reference No.: 99000853
- VLR No.: 002-0023

Significant dates
- Added to NRHP: August 2, 1999
- Designated VLR: October 18, 1995

East Belmont is a historic farm and national historic district located near Keswick, Albemarle County, Virginia. The district encompasses 3 contributing buildings, 1 contributing site, and 1 contributing structure. The original house, now the rear ell, was built about 1811–1814, and is a two-story, three-bay, gable roofed frame structure. In 1834, a two-story, five-bay Federal style brick structure was added as the main house. A one-story, glass sunroom was added in the 1960s. The front facade features a two-story, pedimented portico. Also on the property are a contributing 19th-century corncrib, early 20th-century stone and frame barn, and an early 20th-century henhouse.

It was added to the National Register of Historic Places in 1999.

== See also ==
- John Rogers, first owner of East Belmont
- Belmont Plantation (Albemarle County, Virginia), the portion of the Belmont estate that was split in 1811, creating East Belmont
