= John Harvie =

American Founding Father and politician

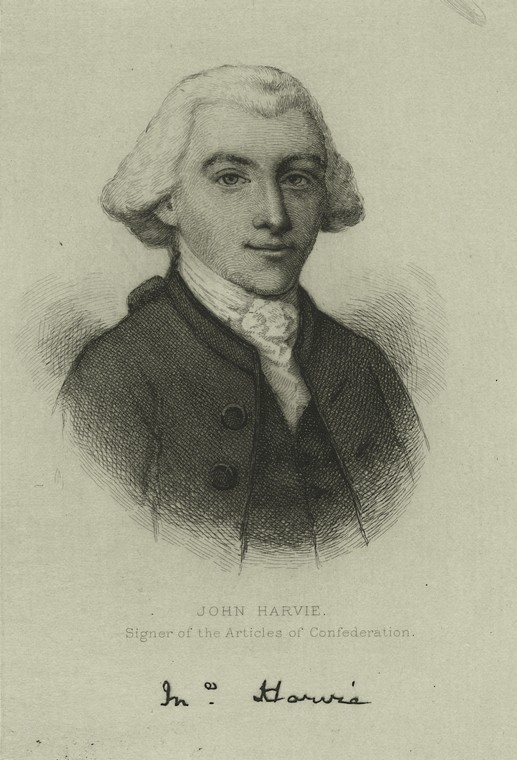
- Albert Rosenthal etching of Harvie

Secretary of the Commonwealth of Virginia
- In office 1788–1789

Mayor of Richmond, Virginia
- In office 1785–1786
- Preceded by: Robert Mitchell
- Succeeded by: William Pennock

Delegate to the Second Continental Congress
- In office 1777–1778

Member of the Virginia conventions
- In office 1775–1776

Personal details
- Born: 1742 Albemarle County, Virginia, British America
- Died: February 6, 1807 (aged 64–65) Richmond, Virginia, U.S.
- Resting place: Hollywood Cemetery, Richmond, Virginia, U.S.
- Profession: Lawyer, Statesman

John Harvie (1742 – February 6, 1807) was an American Founding Father, lawyer and builder from Virginia. He was a delegate to the Second Continental Congress, where he signed the Articles of Confederation, in 1777 and 1778. He was a successful lawyer and landowner, as well as the fourth mayor of Richmond, Virginia. Thomas Jefferson was a friend since his childhood; his father was Jefferson's guardian. He negotiated a peace treaty in 1774 after the Battle of Point Pleasant. During the American Revolutionary War, he was on the Board of War and operated a prison of war camp on his property, The Barracks.

== Personal life ==
Harvie was born at Belmont Plantation in Albemarle County, Virginia, in 1742, to Scottish immigrant John Harvie Sr. (1706–1767) and Martha Gaines Harvie. His brother Richard managed a store in Charlottesville and had established R. Harvie & Company or Harvie & Company with a partner. Harvie was a close friend of Thomas Jefferson and Robert Morris. His father was Jefferson's legal guardian after Peter Jefferson died in 1757. Harvie was a lawyer who settled in Augusta County.

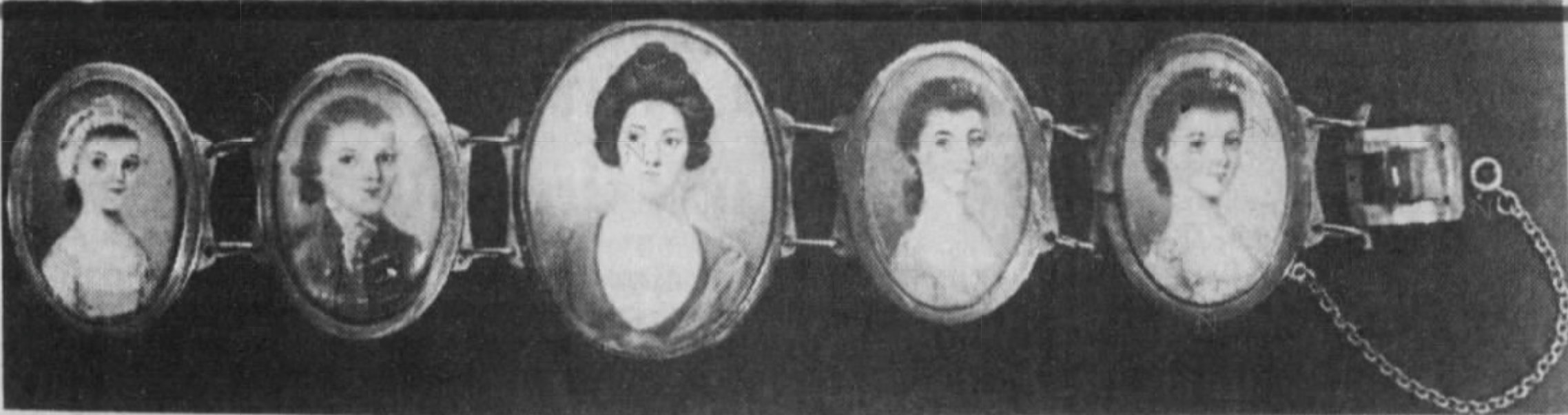
Margaret Strother Morton Jones bracelet – miniature portraits of Margaret and four children, including Margaret Morton Jones who married John Harvie.

In 1767, Harvie inherited Belmont Plantation. His mother moved to Georgia with his eight siblings. He married Margaret Morton Jones, daughter of Gabriel Jones and Margaret Strother Morton Jones. (Note: Margaret was married to George Morton before she married Gabriel Jones.) They had four sons—Lewis, John, Edwin, and Jacquelin—and three daughters, Gabriella, Emily, and Julia. He lived at Belmont until 1780, when he moved to Richmond.

== Career ==
=== Law and business ===
Harvie amassed a fortune through his business and financial skills in Richmond and across the state. He was one of the first directors of Bank of Virginia and was superintendent of subscriptions of capital stock for the bank. He built a successful law practice, one of the first lawyers who practiced at the Albemarle bar.

=== Politics ===
After Governor Dunmore dissolved the House of Burgesses, West Augusta County voters elected Harvie as one of their two delegates to its successor, the five Virginia revolutionary conventions legislature in 1775 and 1776. The following year fellow legislators elected Harvie as one of Virginia's delegate to the Second Continental Congress. Harvie never lived in West Augusta County, which never incorporated (the land ultimately became Ohio County, Monongalia County and Yohogania Counties) but trans-Appalachian counties had difficulties both in financing their representatives travel and in finding men willing to take the long and grueling journey to the state capitol.

While at the Continental Congress, Harvie was one of five Virginia delegates to sign the Articles of Confederation on July 9, 1778. He was appointed the registrar of the Land Office in 1780, for which he moved to Richmond. His office was responsible for transactions in the Northwest Territory, western Virginia, Ohio and Kentucky. From 1785 to 1786, Harvie served as the mayor of Richmond.

=== Military ===
In 1774, he was named as a commissioner to the Shawnee tribe to negotiate a peace treaty after the Battle of Point Pleasant. He was a colonel in the Virginia militia in 1776. Harvie and Thomas Walker of Castle Hill were assigned as joint commissioners and given plenary powers to negotiate with Native Americans at Fort Pitt.

Colonel Harvie served as a purchasing agent and supply organizer for Virginia's militia and Continental Army units. He was also on the Board of War during the American Revolutionary War. Becoming aware of the conditions at Valley Forge, members of Congress came to the encampment to inspect for themselves. Washington's reputation and ability to lead were questioned. Harvie told Washington, "My dear General, if you had given some explanation, all these rumors [denigrating Washington] would have been silenced a long time ago."

Based upon his influence, Harvie procured the establishment of the Prison Camp at The Barracks that held 6,000 Hessian and British soldiers in January 1779. Harvey purchased the 240 acre property from Richard Anderson around 1778. It is located west of Charlottesville. Brick buildings housed troops. It had gardens, farm animals, poultry and other outbuildings. A number of men deserted and settled in the mountains, where they married Native American women. Remaining soldiers were taken north when the camp was closed up in November 1780.

The Barracks
- Interactive map of The Barracks
- Town/City: Barracks Farm Road, Charlottesville West
- State: Virginia
- Country: United States
- Coordinates: 38°5′48″N 78°30′59″W
- Established: By 1778
- Area: 240 acres
- Website: www.thebarracksfarm.com

=== Land owner and developer ===
Harvie owned large estates, including Belmont, Pen Park, and The Barracks. In 1798, he bought the Belvidere estate in Richmond from Judge Bushrod Washington. It was compared to other stately manors, like Mount Vernon, and was said to be "an extremely handsome house, and of decidedly superior architecture, being beautifully proportioned".

He had 12 enslaved men in 1782 and no mention of free males. He had 6 cattle and 7 colts and mules. On January 24, 1782, an ad was published in the Virginia Gazette and American Advertiser about Jordan, one of his slaves who ran away. In 1789, Harvie owned 17 enslaved males, 2 of whom were between 12 and 16. He was taxed for his property in Fredricksville Parish of Albemarle County; there were 2 white males and 10 horses.

== Death and legacy ==
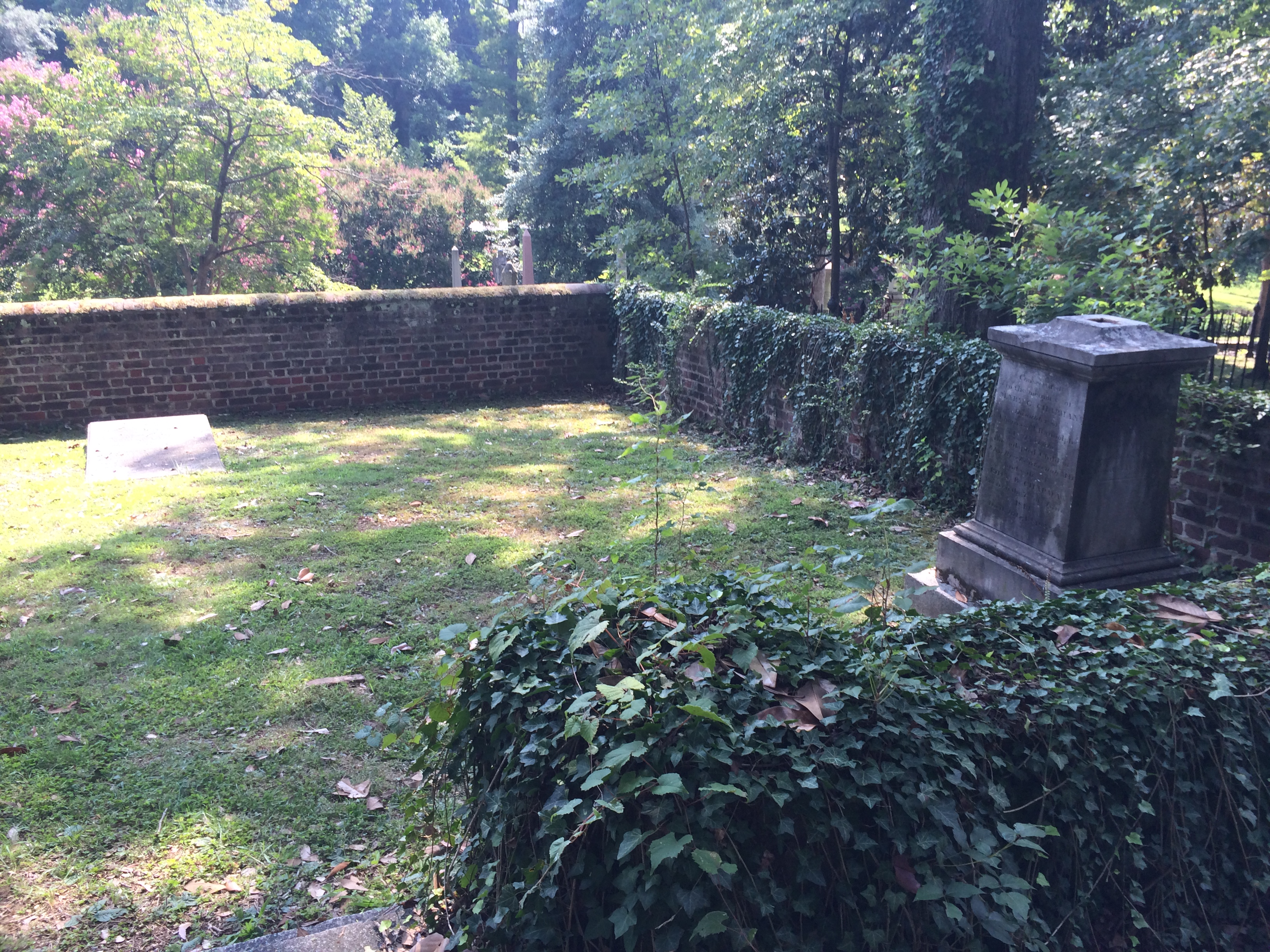
The Harvie family plot now a part of Hollywood Cemetery

While he was inspecting the construction of a mansion being built by Benjamin Latrobe, Harvie fell from the roof and suffered injuries that resulted in his death. (Note: The residence was then purchased by Colonel Robert Gamble. The Times Dispatch stated that the house was built in 1800 for Harvie.) He died on February 6, 1807, and was buried at the family plot at Belvidere. This property later became part of the Hollywood Cemetery in Richmond. His wife Margaret inherited the 20-acre Belvidere estate and lived there until 1814, when she sold it.

Harvie Street between Park Avenue and Cary Street in Richmond was named after Harvie. Jacquelin Street is said to have been named after his son, General Jacquelin Harvie.
