= Southwest Mountains Rural Historic District =

Historic district in Virginia, United States

- U.S. National Register of Historic Places
- U.S. Historic district
- Virginia Landmarks Register
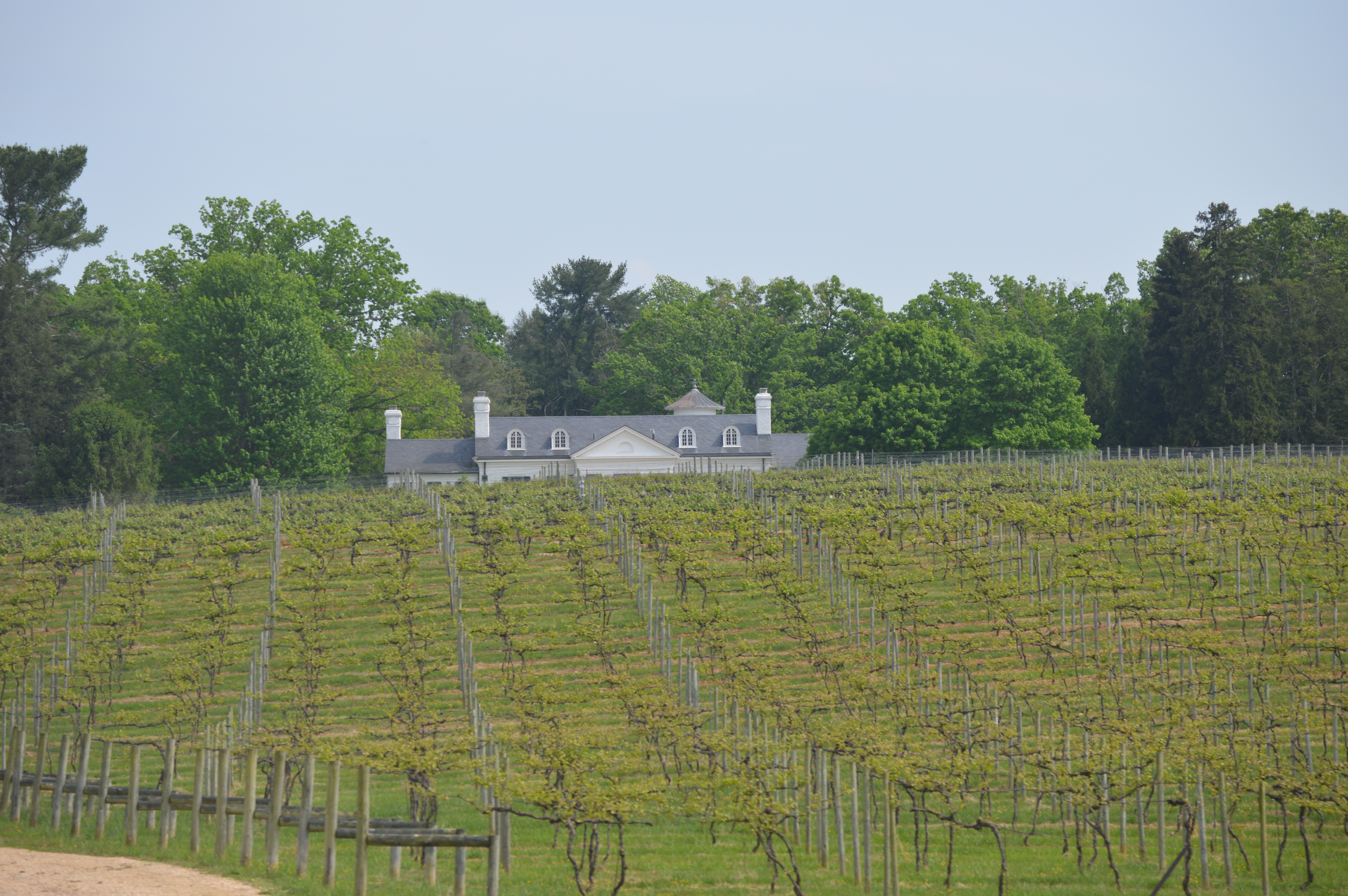
- Farmhouse at Keswick Vineyards, built 1911

- Location within Virginia Location within the United States
- Location: Roughly bounded by I-64, Virginia State Route 20, the Orange County line and the C & O Railroad tracks, near Keswick, Virginia
- Coordinates: 38°05′06″N 78°19′06″W
- Area: 31,975 acres (12,940 ha)
- Architect: William Strickland, et al.
- Architectural style: Greek Revival, Italianate, Federal
- NRHP reference No.: 92000054
- VLR No.: 002-1832

Significant dates
- Added to NRHP: February 27, 1992
- Designated VLR: August 21, 1991

Southwest Mountains Rural Historic District is a national historic district located near Keswick, Albemarle County, Virginia. The district encompasses 854 contributing buildings, 73 contributing sites, 30 contributing structures, and 1 contributing object. It includes a variety of large farms, historic villages, and crossroads communities. The area is known primarily for its large and imposing Federal, Greek Revival, and Georgian Revival plantation houses and country estates. It features a broad range of architecture—mainly domestic and farm-related—from the late 18th, 19th, and 20th centuries.

It was added to the National Register of Historic Places in 1992.
