= Wilmington Township, Mercer County, Pennsylvania =

Township in Pennsylvania, US

Coordinates: 41°08′00″N 80°19′59″W

Wilmington Township
- Township
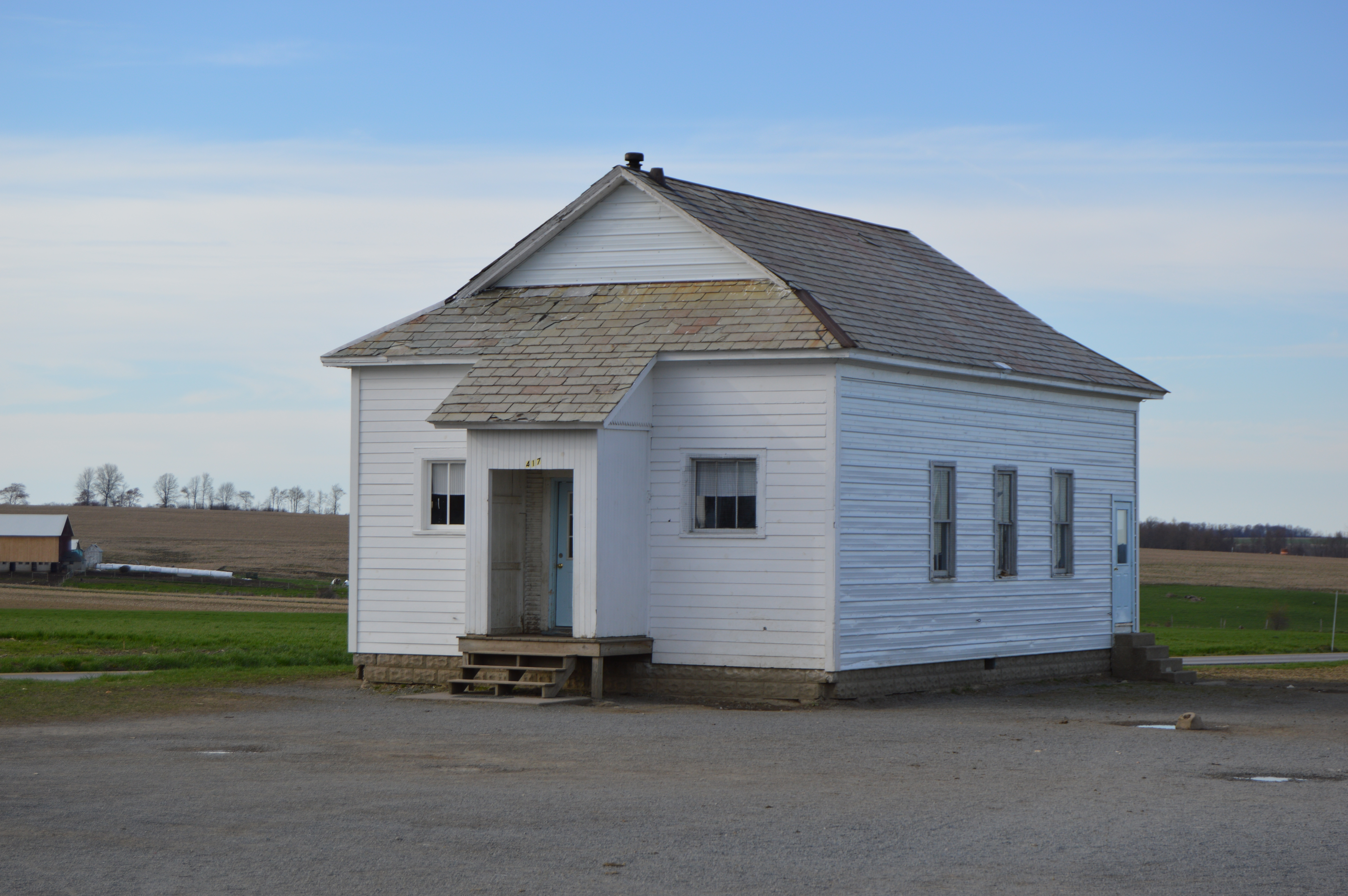
- School northeast of New Wilmington

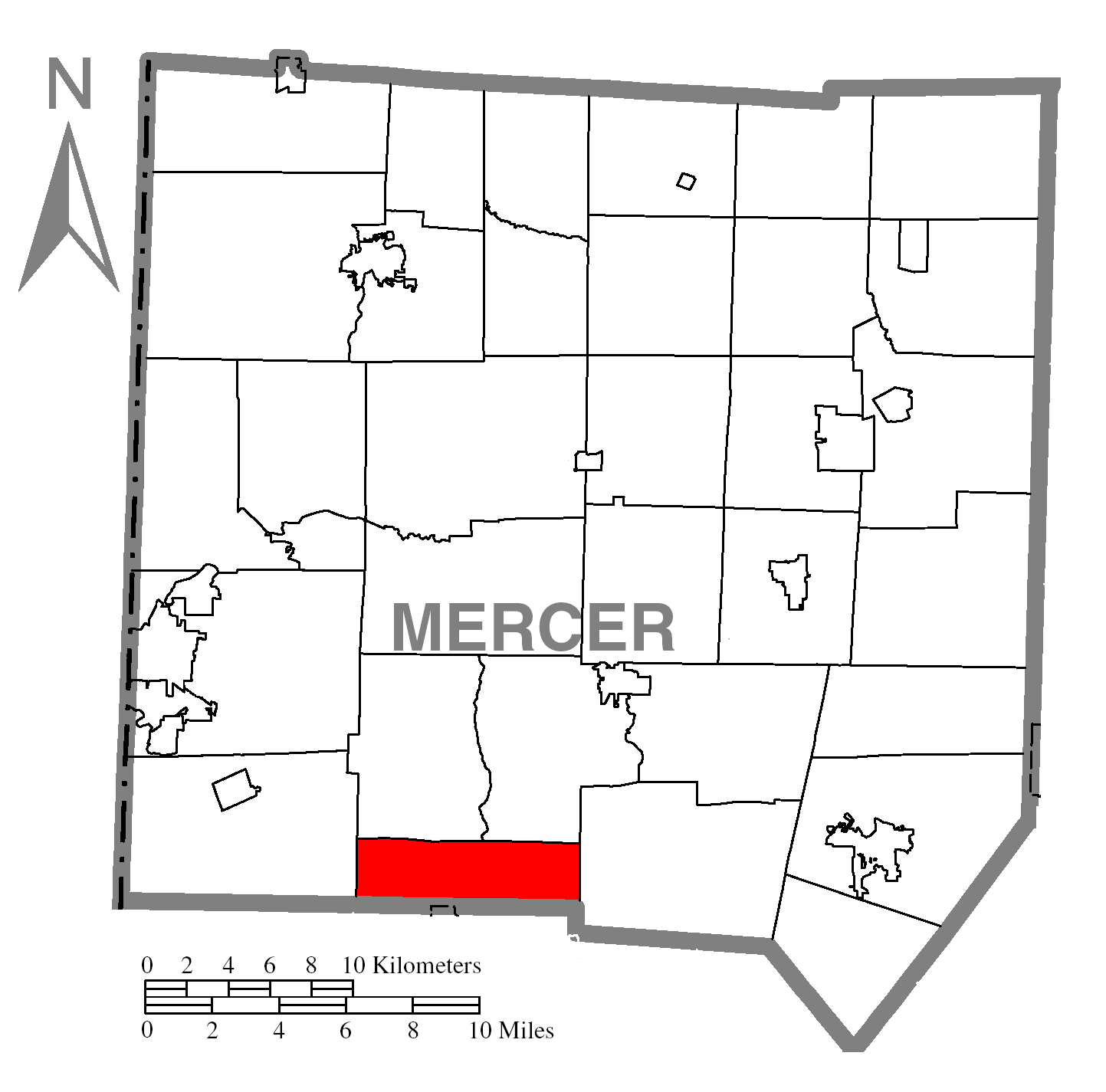
- Location of Wilmington Township in Mercer County

- Location of Mercer County in Pennsylvania
- Country: United States
- State: Pennsylvania
- County: Mercer County

Area
  - Total: 13.06 sq mi (33.82 km^{2})
  - Land: 13.05 sq mi (33.81 km^{2})
  - Water: 0.0039 sq mi (0.01 km^{2})

Population (2020)
  - Total: 1,410
  - Estimate (2022): 1,403
  - Density: 107.5/sq mi (41.52/km^{2})
- Time zone: UTC-4 (EST)
  - Summer (DST): UTC-5 (EDT)
- Area code: 724
- FIPS code: 42-085-85512
- Website: http://www.wilmingtontownship.com/

Historical population
Census	Pop.	Note	%±
2000	1,105		—
2010	1,415		28.1%
2020	1,416		0.1%
2022 (est.)	1,403		−0.9%
U.S. Decennial Census

Wilmington Township is a township in Mercer County, Pennsylvania, United States. The population was 1,416 at the 2020 census, an increase from 1,415 in 2010 .

== Geography ==
According to the United States Census Bureau, the township has a total area of 13.1 square miles (33.9 km^{2}), of which 13.1 square miles (33.9 km^{2}) is land and 0.04 square mile (0.1 km^{2}) (0.15%) is water.

== Demographics ==
As of the census of 2000, there were 1,105 people, 380 households, and 299 families residing in the township. The population density was 84.5 inhabitants per square mile (32.6/km^{2}). There were 392 housing units at an average density of 30.0 per square mile (11.6/km^{2}). The racial makeup of the township was 98.55% White, 0.09% African American, 0.36% Asian, 0.18% Pacific Islander, and 0.81% from two or more races. Hispanic or Latino of any race were 0.90% of the population.

There were 380 households, out of which 35.3% had children under the age of 18 living with them, 69.2% were married couples living together, 5.8% had a female householder with no husband present, and 21.3% were non-families. 19.7% of all households were made up of individuals, and 10.8% had someone living alone who was 65 years of age or older. The average household size was 2.91 and the average family size was 3.37.

In the township the population was spread out, with 29.8% under the age of 18, 11.0% from 18 to 24, 22.0% from 25 to 44, 23.7% from 45 to 64, and 13.5% who were 65 years of age or older. The median age was 36 years. For every 100 females there were 86.3 males. For every 100 females age 18 and over, there were 90.7 males.

The median income for a household in the township was $38,068, and the median income for a family was $45,417. Males had a median income of $33,036 versus $21,250 for females. The per capita income for the township was $17,719. About 10.6% of families and 16.2% of the population were below the poverty line, including 25.0% of those under age 18 and 4.1% of those age 65 or over.

== See also ==
- Indian Run, Mercer County, Pennsylvania, an Underground Railroad station and site of Pandenarium, a former settlement for freedmen in Wilmington Township.
