= Keswick, Virginia =

Unincorporated community in Virginia, United States

Keswick
- Census-designated place
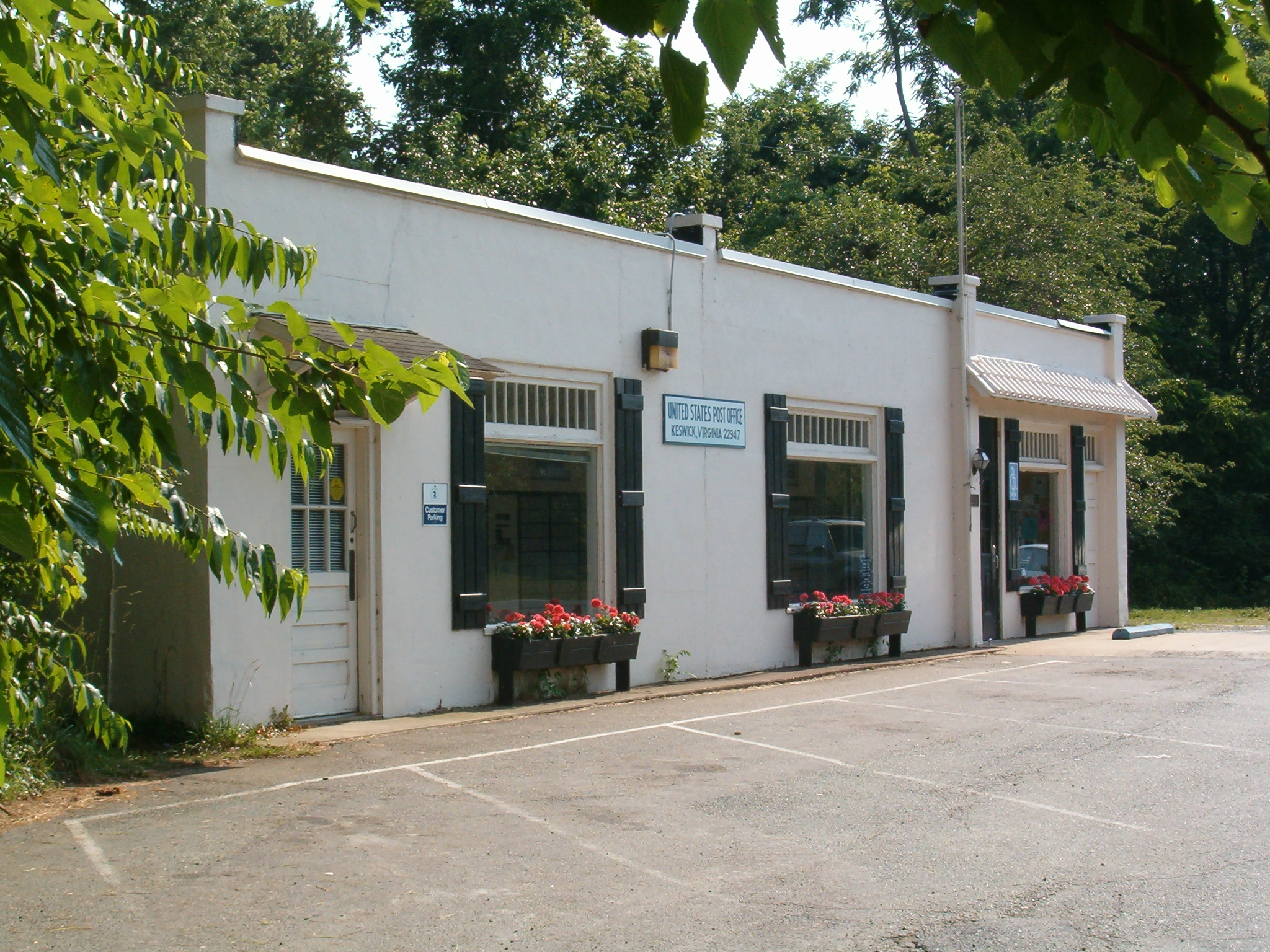
- Keswick Post Office

- Location of the Keswick CDP within the Albemarle county

- Location within the Commonwealth of Virginia Keswick (the United States)
- Coordinates: 38°1′30″N 78°21′20″W
- Country: United States
- State: Virginia
- County: Albemarle

Area
  - Total: 2.00 sq mi (5.19 km^{2})
  - Land: 1.99 sq mi (5.16 km^{2})
  - Water: 0.012 sq mi (0.03 km^{2})
- Elevation: 449 ft (137 m)

Population (2020)
  - Total: 321
  - Density: 161/sq mi (62.2/km^{2})
- Time zone: UTC−5 (Eastern (EST))
  - Summer (DST): UTC−4 (EDT)
- FIPS code: 51-42216
- GNIS feature ID: 2807398

Keswick is a census-designated place in Albemarle County, Virginia, United States, about six miles (9.7 km) east of Charlottesville. As of the 2020 census, Keswick had a population of 321.

== Community ==
Keswick has few businesses, and lacks a central business district. It is predominantly residential, with a mixture of large farms, estates, middle-income, and low-income housing. Since many of the parcels of land in Keswick are large, it is relatively undeveloped and retains its natural environment, which includes views of the Southwest Mountains. The drive through Keswick "has often been cited as one of the most scenic in America," writes the New York Times. Many of the estates were plantations in the 18th century. No major development took place in Keswick until the 1990s, and the development since then has been subject to strict scrutiny by Albemarle County officials.

Oakland School, a special boarding and day school for children with learning disabilities, is in Keswick, as is the Keswick School, a boarding school for students with social skill and emotional struggles. A CSX freight rail line runs through the town. The Shackelford family, long prominent in Albemarle and Orange counties and in the Monticello Association, has a family cemetery in Keswick.

The postal delivery area by the name of Keswick is larger than Keswick itself, extending to the north nearly to Gordonsville and to the west to Stony Point, encompassing towns too small to have a post office, including Cash Corner, Cismont, Lindsay, Stony Point, Boyd Tavern, Cobham, Whitlock, and Rosena.

East Belmont, Limestone, and Southwest Mountains Rural Historic District are listed on the National Register of Historic Places.

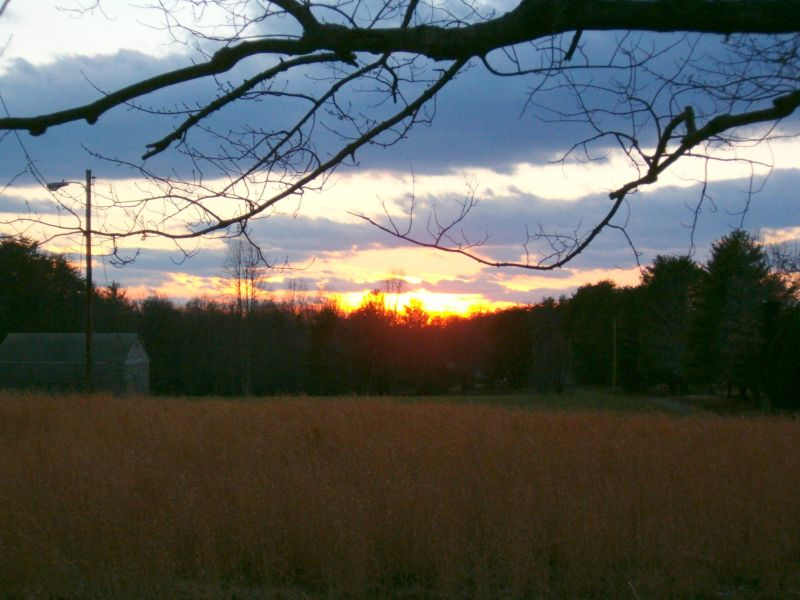
Countryside in Keswick

== Demographics ==
Keswick first appeared as a census designated place in the 2020 U.S. census.

== Keswick Hunt Club ==
"According to its website, the Keswick Hunt Club was established in 1896 and formally recognized in 1903. There are currently about 200 individual and family memberships and the club's estimated 60 hounds hunt on land in Albemarle, Louisa, Madison and Orange counties."

There is a special award given each year by the club's Masters and Huntsman in honor of an outstanding fox hound. "The "Barrister" award is named for one of Keswick's finest dog hounds who had a great nose and really deep cry and whose offspring bear his resemblance and qualities today."

In 1929, John Stewart, M.F.H. instigated the first Thanksgiving Blessing of the Hounds Service in the yard of Grace Episcopal Church (Keswick, Virginia), another tradition that has continued to the present. Hounds, horses and riders gather for a religious service of prayers and hymns followed by a hunt. The collection taken at the service benefits charity.

== In film ==
The Keswick train station (no longer in operation) which is now part of Little Keswick School and used as a dining hall, as well as the farm of Belmont (not to be confused with East Belmont) are featured in the 1956 film Giant. The portions of the movie set in Maryland were filmed at these places in Keswick.
