= Southwest Mountains =

Mountain range in Virginia, U.S.

Coordinates: 38.09593°N 78.336639°W

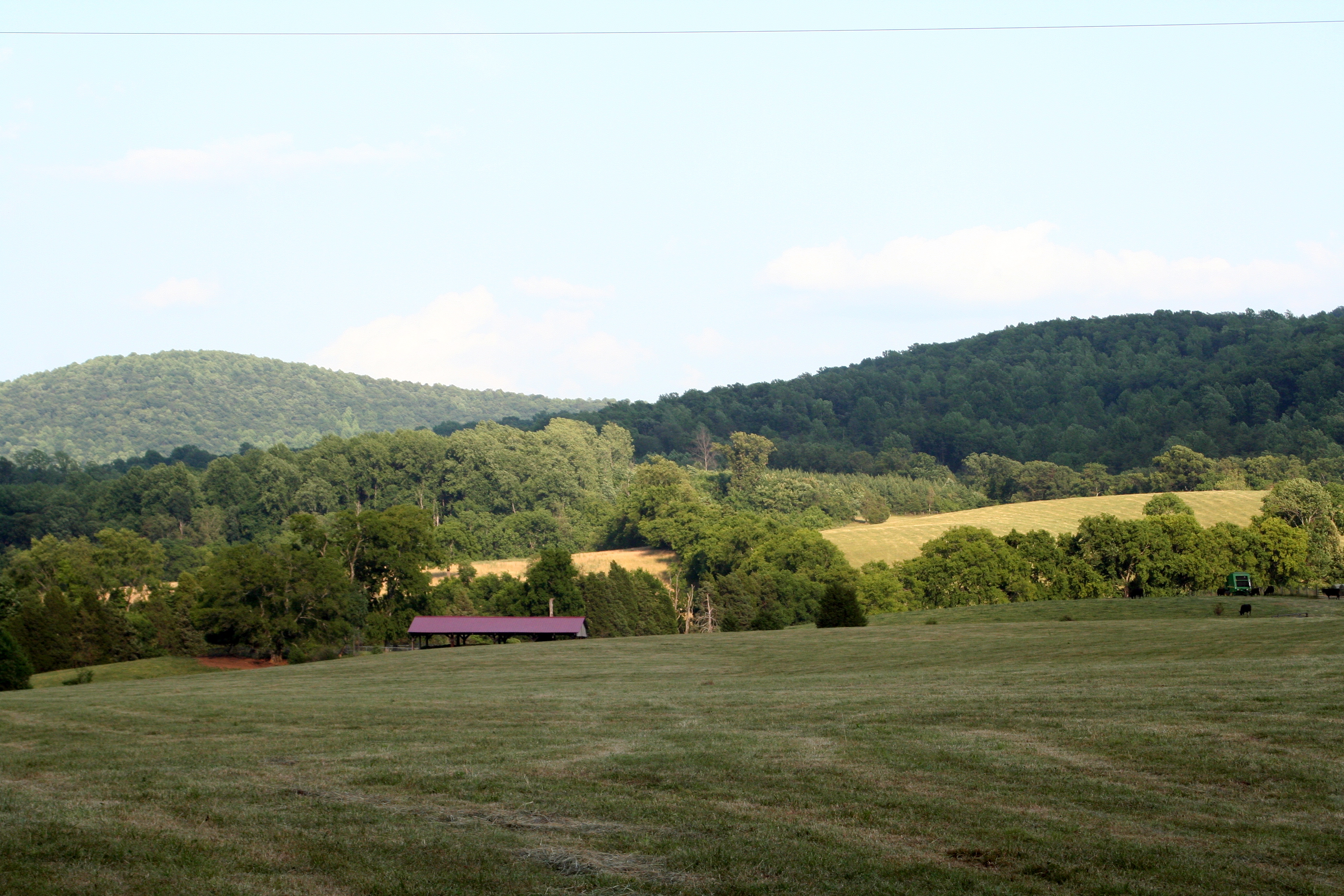
- The Southwest Mountains, northern Albemarle County

Highest point
- Peak: Peters Mountain
- Elevation: 1,801 ft (549 m)

Dimensions
- Length: 70 mi (110 km)
- Width: 3.5 mi (5.6 km)

Geography
- Country: United States
- State: Virginia
- Region: Piedmont
- Parent range: Appalachian Mountains

The Southwest Mountains of Virginia are a mountain range centered on Charlottesville, parallel to and geologically associated with the Blue Ridge Mountains, which lie about 30 miles (48 km) to the west. The range is breached by the Rivanna River between Monticello and Pantops Mountain. Some of the more prominent peaks include Carters Mountain, Fan Mountain, Brush Mountain, Peters Mountain, Walton's Mountain, and Hightop Mountain.

== Geography ==
The Southwest Mountains are not particularly large, the highest point barely reaching 1,800 feet. They are one of the easternmost ranges in Virginia (along with the geologically associated Bull Run Mountains and Catoctin Mountain) and the viewshed for the Blue Ridge Mountains through Nelson and Albemarle Counties.

The range bisects Nelson, Albemarle, and Orange counties. A portion of the Southwest Mountains in Albemarle County has been designated a Rural Historic District by the National Park Service, though none of the range is designated as state or national parkland.

== Geology ==
The Southwest Mountains are underlain by a belt of Catoctin greenstone, which forms the eastern edge of the Blue Ridge anticlinorium. The Catoctin Greenstone belt extends north into Maryland and also supports the Bull Run and Catoctin Mountains. The basalt flows which were metamorphosed to greenstone were deposited during the latest Precambrian age and first uplifted during Grenville Orogeny then again during the Alleghenian Orogeny, in which they were also transported westward to their present location.

The mountains are part of EPA ecoregion 64c, the Northern Piedmont Uplands, and are typically defined by Appalachian oak forests, composed primarily of oaks and hickories. The Catoctin greenstone leads to a mafic or basic soil composition with a relatively high PH, corresponding to "more fertile soils weathered from metabasalt, [where] Basic Oak-Hickory Forests form the forest matrix. In contrast to Oak/Heath Forests, these communities are relatively species-rich, with patchy but diverse herb layers and very few heath shrubs. Instead, small trees such as redbud and eastern hop hornbeam dominate the understory."

== History and culture ==
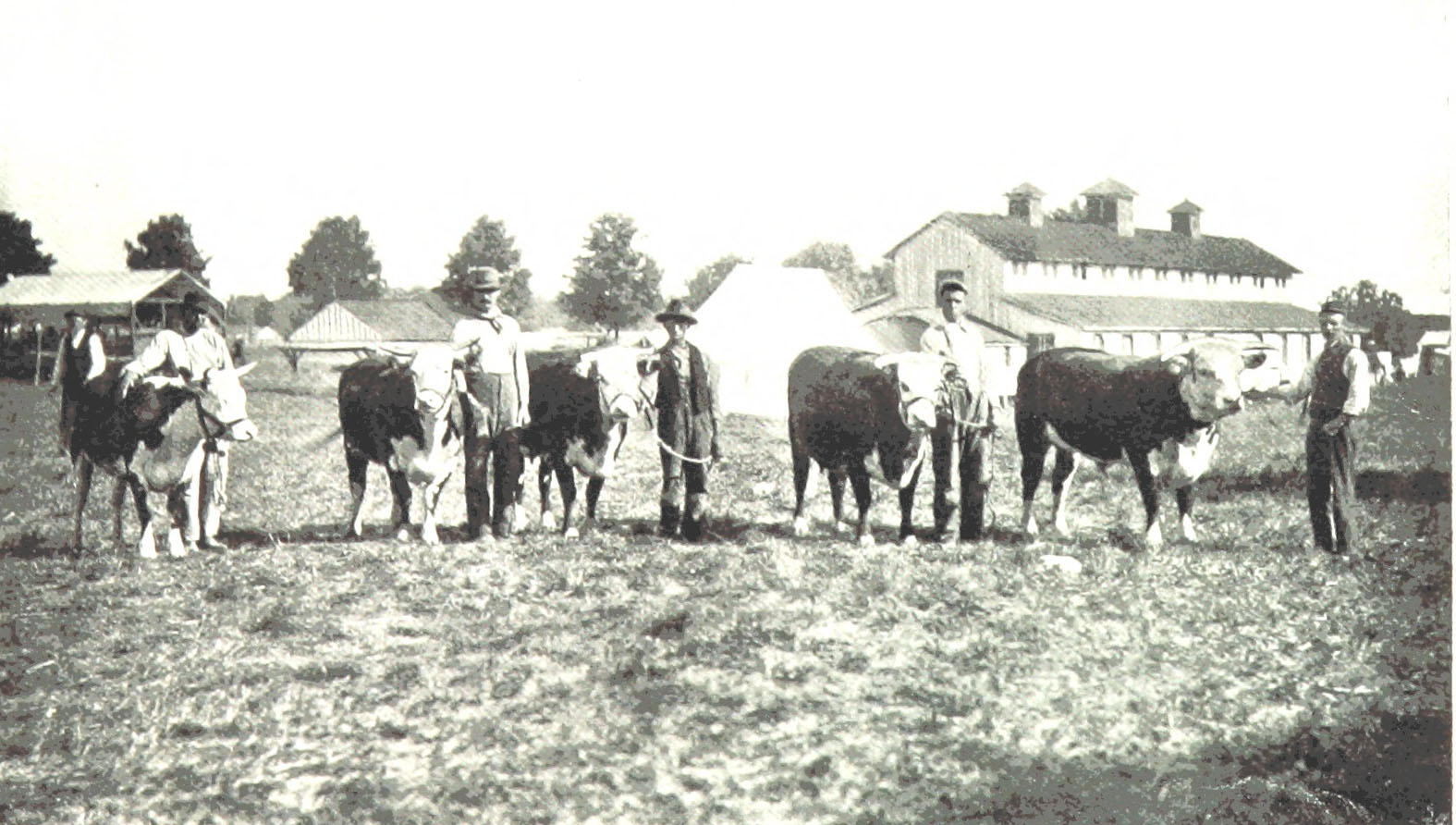
Castalia Farm in the Southwest Mountains in 1899.

In its designation as a Virginia historical landmark, the Virginia Board of Historic Resources described the northern Albemarle portion of the Southwest Mountains as "some of the Piedmont's most pristine and scenic countryside." They went on:

Characterized by undulating pastures, winding roadways, forested hills, and small hamlets, the district contains a broad range of 18th-, 19th- and early 20th-century rural architecture, reflecting the evolving cultural patterns of more than 250 years of settlement.

The estates of Thomas Jefferson, James Madison and James Monroe are all located within the Southwest Mountains, as are many non-presidential estates, including Castle Hill. The ruins of Barboursville, a Jefferson-designed plantation home, are near the northern end of the range.

Virginia Governor James Barbour, who lived in Orange County, wrote in 1835:

Let us, the inhabitants of the South-West Mountains, rejoice and be grateful that our benefits greatly preponderate over our ills. And so far as my testimony goes, resulting from actual observation of near one-third of the entire circumference of the earth, I feel no hesitation in declaring that I deem them the most desirable abode I have ever seen.

These mountains were at one time also referred to as the "Chestnut Mountains." The plateaux of the Southwest Mountains in southern Albemarle and Nelson County were once referred to as the "Green Mountains." The mountains today are mainly left forested, along with some housing, agriculture, and horse farms. There are several producers of wine and cider in and around the mountains, and Carters Mountain features an orchard and event space along its ridge. Mineral resources of soapstone and vermiculite continue to be mined at the southern end of the range.
