= Shadwell, Virginia =

- CDP
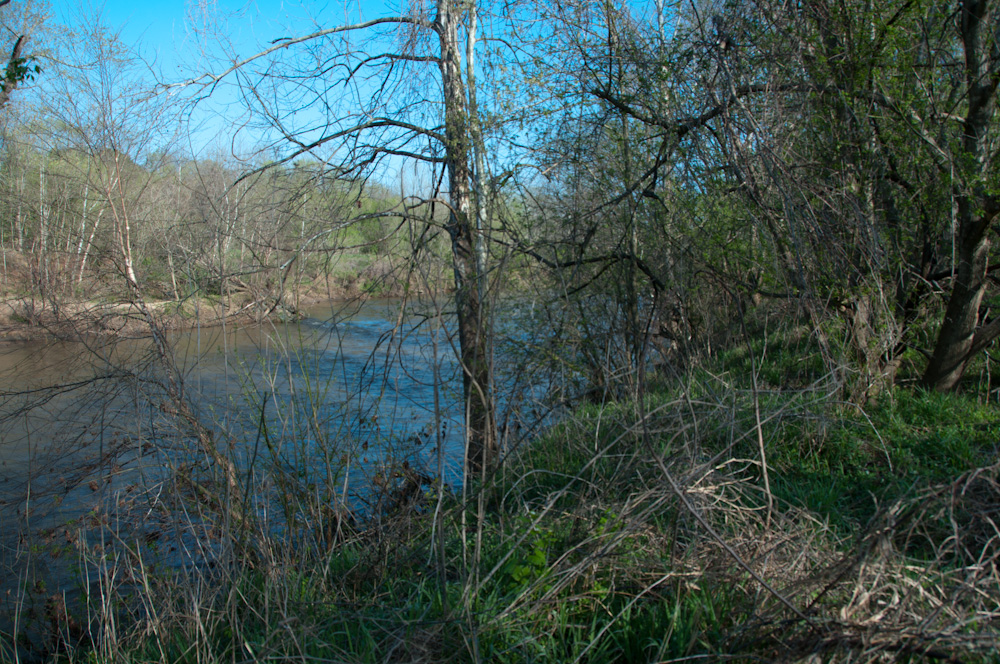
- A view of the Rivanna River in Shadwell
- Nickname: "Birthplace of Thomas Jefferson"
- Location within Virginia
- Coordinates: 38°00′44.5782″N 78°25′4.0002″W
- Country: United States
- State: Virginia
- County: Albemarle
- Elevation: 360 ft (110 m)
- Time zone: UTC-5 (Eastern (EST))
  - Summer (DST): UTC-4 (EDT)
- ZIP Code: 22947
- Area code: 434

Shadwell is a census-designated place (CDP) in Albemarle County, Virginia, United States. It is located by the Rivanna River near Charlottesville. It was the birthplace of Thomas Jefferson, the central intellectual force behind the American Revolution, author of the United States Declaration of Independence, and the third president of the United States. The site is marked by a Virginia Historical Marker, which indicates it as Jefferson's birthplace. Along with Clifton, it has been named to the National Register of Historic Places.

Before early colonists moved into the Shadwell area during the colonial era, Monacan people had trails that traversed present-day Shadwell. Jefferson's father, Peter Jefferson, established and named the Shadwell plantation in the mid-18th century. Four generations of the Jefferson family lived at Shadwell, which was initially a plantation, where both enslaved and free people grew tobacco, grain, and clover.

Shadwell later became a grist mill, sawmill, and carding factory, which expanded its economy. Canals and locks were constructed in the Rivanna River to transport goods, including lumber, flour, grain, and cotton-yard. After the carding factory burned down in the 1850s and the Louisa Railroad was completed, Shadwell began to decline economically. After that, the Shadwell estate became a farm, operated by Downing Smith. In 1991, an archaeological study found remnants of foundations and cellars of two houses, one of which is believed to be the original house where Peter Jefferson and his son Thomas lived and worked.

Also located in the Shadwell, Virginia area are the Clifton and Edge Hill historic homes.

== History ==
=== Pre-settlement ===
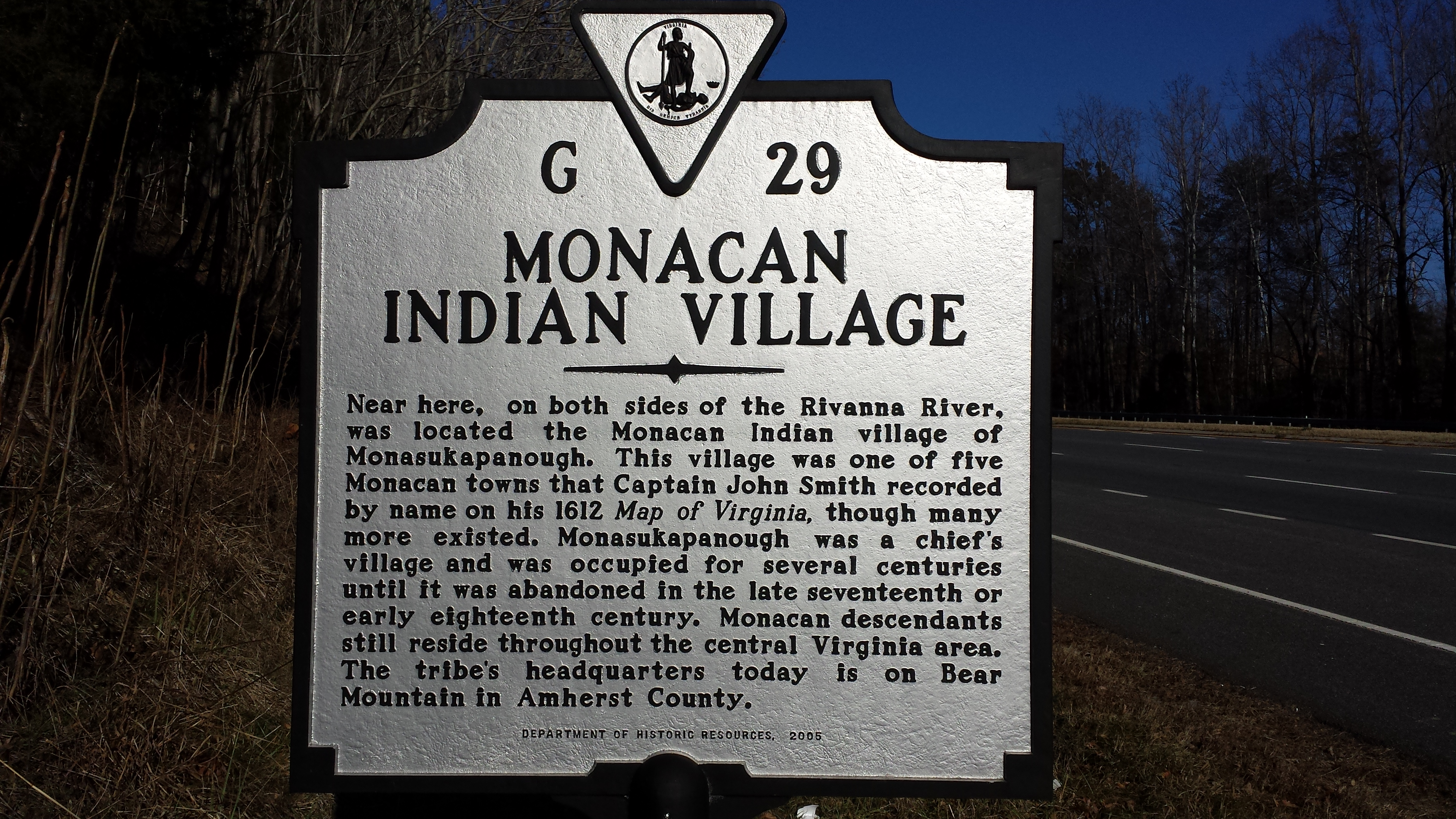
A historical marker near the site of the Monacan village of Monasukapanough in northern Albemarle County, Virginia. It was located upstream of Shadwell and north of Charlottesville

Monacan Native American people had trails that crossed through what is now Shadwell.

=== The Jeffersons ===
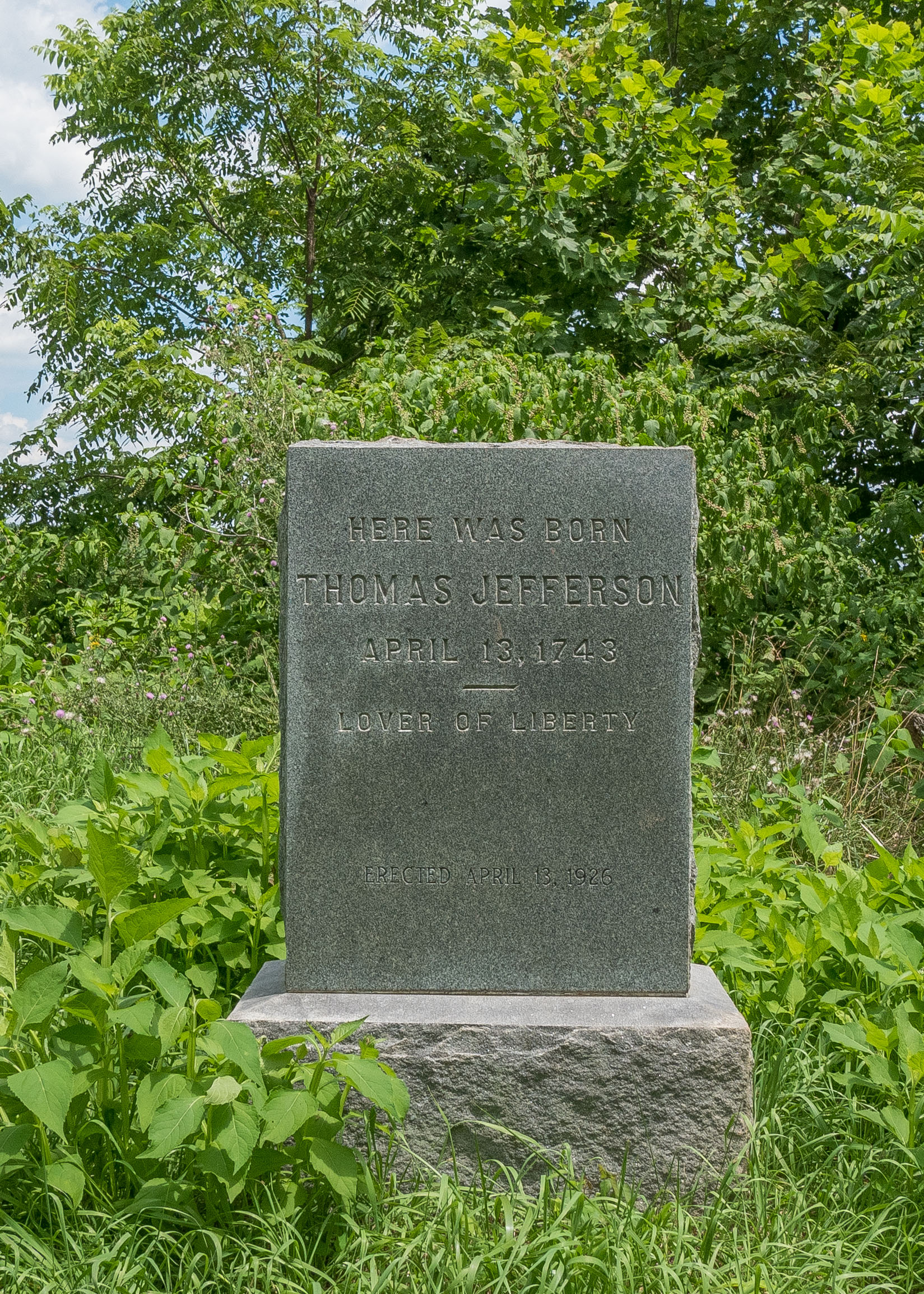
Thomas Jefferson's birthplace monument in Shadwell

There were three or four early colonial Virginia people who owned Shadwell before it was purchased by Peter Jefferson, the father of Thomas Jefferson. Shadwell began as a crossroads settlement, located at the intersection of Three Notch'd and Old Mountain Roads, which may also be called Turkey Sag.

It was named for the Shadwell parish in London by Peter Jefferson, a colonist and planter in central Virginia. Shadwell is the parish in England where his wife Jane Randolph had been christened. (Note: Peter Jefferson and Jane Randolph had six children, among them Thomas, who would become the third president of the United States. Active in county meetings Peter was appointed Justice of the Peace of Albemarle county, taking his oath in September 1744. The following month he was appointed lieutenant colonel to the Albemarle county militia.) Peter Jefferson purchased 1,200 acres in 1736 and had 1,400 acres for his main plantation through a May 16, 1741 purchase. Peter married his wife in 1739 and completed the one-and-a-half-story house at Shadwell by about 1741. (Note: Lay and Mead state that the house at Shadwell was built in 1737. The house was described as a "plain, weather-boarded house one and a half stories high, having four spacious rooms and hall on the ground-floor, with garret, chambers, and dormer-windows above… The house sat very near the highway, which then ran along the north bank of the river.") Shadwell was the birthplace of Thomas Jefferson. Peter Jefferson built a gristmill on the Rivanna River about 1757. Native American leaders, including Ontasseté often stopped at Shadwell to visit with Peter Jefferson on their way to Colonial Williamsburg.

When his father died, Thomas Jefferson inherited the property on April 13, 1764. Until 1776, the year of his mother's death, he leased the property from Jane Randolph Jefferson because she had a life estate for the property. Between 1765 and 1794, Thomas operated Shadwell as a tobacco plantation, led by overseer who was chosen to conduct work humanely and work performed in 1774 by six slaves. At that time, he had 18 slaves, but 12 of them were too old or too young to work. He also hired free men to work on the plantation. The estate included houses for slaves, tobacco barns, stables, mills, and gardens.

External images
- Historic marker, Shadwell, Jefferson's birthplace
- Jefferson's mill at Shadwell
- Shadwell railroad station

In 1770, the Jeffersons' house at Shadwell was destroyed in a fire, and Jane built a smaller house as a replacement. Thomas lived at Shadwell (Note: He lived at Shadwell until age 27, except for the period in which he was at college and studied law.) until the fire, at which time he removed to Monticello. (Note: After the U.S. had won its independence, Thomas Jefferson desired to reform the Virginia government. In 1771, Virginia's "greatest flood" to that time, destroyed the gristmill. Thomas Jefferson returned to public service and leased the plantation and a large manufacturing mill he built until 1813, when he deeded the property to Thomas Jefferson Randolph, his grandson. The current main house, located about two miles from the original house, was built about 1849 by Caryanne Randolph Ruffin and Colonel Frank Ruffin, Jefferson's granddaughter and Thomas Jefferson Randolph's daughter and her husband. They called it Shadwell and raised a large family there. In September 1776, during the American Revolutionary War, Jefferson returned to Virginia and was elected to the Virginia House of Delegates for Albemarle County, where he sought to create a new government for the Colony of Virginia.) During a fire at Shadwell, Jefferson lost almost all of his books and all of his papers. Although he did not live at Shadwell after the fire, Jefferson continued to operate Shadwell as a farm, where he grew and rotated crops of clover, corn, and wheat.

=== Manufacturing ===
Shadwell became a manufacturing town, with timber, tobacco, cotton-yard and flour being transported on the Rivanna River. A dam, mill, and half-mile mill race were built on the Rivanna River by Peter Jefferson about 1757. Canals and locks were used at Shadwell for transportation of goods on the Rivanna River from 1789 until the 1860s.

Jefferson operated a grist mill, saw mill, and carding factory until 1826 (year of his death). By 1835, Shadwell was home to a large carding factory employing 100 workers, a large merchant mill, and a sawmill. It also had several general stores at Shadwell, shops, and private dwellings. The town prospered until 1850, when the factory burned and was shut down permanently. The town was a minor railroad center, but Shadwell also began to decline after Louisa Railroad, which paralleled Three Notch'd Road, came to the area in the 1840s.

=== Late 19th century and 20th century ===
Shadwell became focused once again on farming when Downing Smith of Greene County purchased 230 acres of Shadwell land in 1879. The following year he built a house near the site of the original Jefferson house. He came to own a total of 1035 acres of land from Shadwell and the Edge Hill plantation of the Randolph family of Virginia. After World War I, Shadwell grew as people began taking vacations by traveling by automobile. The railroad depot at Shadwell was closed in 1932.

In 1991, an archaeological study began at the site of the Jefferson's Shadwell plantation. Two cellar foundations were found, one of which is believed to be that of the first Jefferson house.

== See also ==
- Thomas Jefferson Center for Historic Plants
