= National Register of Historic Places listings in Fluvanna County, Virginia =

Location of Fluvanna County in Virginia

This is a list of the National Register of Historic Places listings in Fluvanna County, Virginia.

This is intended to be a complete list of the properties and districts on the National Register of Historic Places in Fluvanna County, Virginia, United States. The locations of National Register properties and districts for which the latitude and longitude coordinates are included below, may be seen in a Google map.

There are 18 properties and districts listed on the National Register in the county, including 1 National Historic Landmark.

This National Park Service list is complete through NPS recent listings posted March 6, 2026.

== Current listings ==
	Name on the Register	Image	Date listed	Location	City or town	Description
1	Bremo Plantation	Bremo Plantation	November 12, 1969 (#69000241)	West of Bremo Bluff off U.S. Route 15; 37°43′31″N 78°19′47″W	Bremo Bluff	
2	Bremo Slave Chapel	Bremo Slave Chapel	March 17, 1980 (#80004189)	North of Bremo Bluff; 37°43′01″N 78°17′50″W	Bremo Bluff	
3	Fluvanna County Courthouse Historic District	Fluvanna County Courthouse Historic District	September 22, 1971 (#71000977)	Roughly bounded by Courthouse Rd., U.S. Route 15, and the Rivanna River; 37°51′39″N 78°15′52″W	Palmyra	
4	Glen Arvon	Glen Arvon	May 28, 1976 (#76002106)	East of Bremo Bluff near the junction of Bremo and Bottom Rds. 37°42′01″N 78°14′19″W	Bremo Bluff	
5	Glen Burnie	Glen Burnie	August 2, 2000 (#00000893)	U.S. Route 15, 0.25 miles (0.40 km) north of Palmyra; 37°52′02″N 78°15′26″W	Palmyra	
6	Gum Creek	Gum Creek	October 22, 2003 (#03001084)	1317 Stage Junction Rd. 37°46′26″N 78°09′56″W	Columbia	
7	Laughton	Laughton	April 1, 2002 (#02000318)	Perkins Rd. 37°53′47″N 78°06′44″W	Kents Store	
8	Melrose	Melrose	August 14, 2000 (#00000892)	Shores Rd., southwest of its junction with Mountain Hill Rd. 37°44′27″N 78°21′36″W	Fork Union	
9	The Oaks	The Oaks	July 13, 2001 (#01000696)	5025 Tabscott Rd. 37°52′24″N 78°05′09″W	Kents Store	
10	Pleasant Grove	Pleasant Grove	August 12, 2004 (#04000843)	State Route 53; 37°52′21″N 78°17′31″W	Palmyra	
11	Point of Fork Arsenal	Point of Fork Arsenal	October 1, 1969 (#69000242)	Point of Fork; 37°45′03″N 78°10′03″W	Columbia	
12	Point of Fork Plantation	Point of Fork Plantation	August 13, 1974 (#74002116)	West of Columbia off Point of Fork Rd. 37°45′13″N 78°10′50″W	Columbia	
13	Rivanna Farm	Rivanna Farm	February 16, 2001 (#01000147)	Bremo Farms Ln. 37°44′07″N 78°12′21″W	Bremo Bluff	
14	Scottsville Historic District	Scottsville Historic District	July 30, 1976 (#76002093)	State Route 6; 37°47′54″N 78°29′21″W	Scottsville	Extends into Albemarle County
15	Seay's Chapel Methodist Church	Seay's Chapel Methodist Church	August 22, 2012 (#12000540)	4916 Shores Rd. 37°44′41″N 78°21′40″W	Palmyra	
16	Seven Islands Archeological and Historic District	Seven Islands Archeological and Historic District	July 3, 1991 (#91000832)	Address Restricted	Arvonia	Extends into Buckingham County
17	Union Mills Canal Outlet Locks #1 and #2	Union Mills Canal Outlet Locks #1 and #2	October 14, 1999 (#99001256)	Rivanna River at the mouth of Boston Creek; 37°54′51″N 78°17′41″W	Crofton	
18	Western View	Western View	April 1, 2002 (#02000320)	Lowfields Ln. 37°44′05″N 78°21′19″W	Fork Union	

== See also ==
- List of National Historic Landmarks in Virginia
- National Register of Historic Places listings in Virginia
