= Gum Creek =

Gum Creek may refer to:

- Gum Creek (Missouri), a stream in Missouri
- Gum Creek (Virginia), a historic house near Columbia, Virginia
