= Aamir Simms =

American basketball player (born 1999)

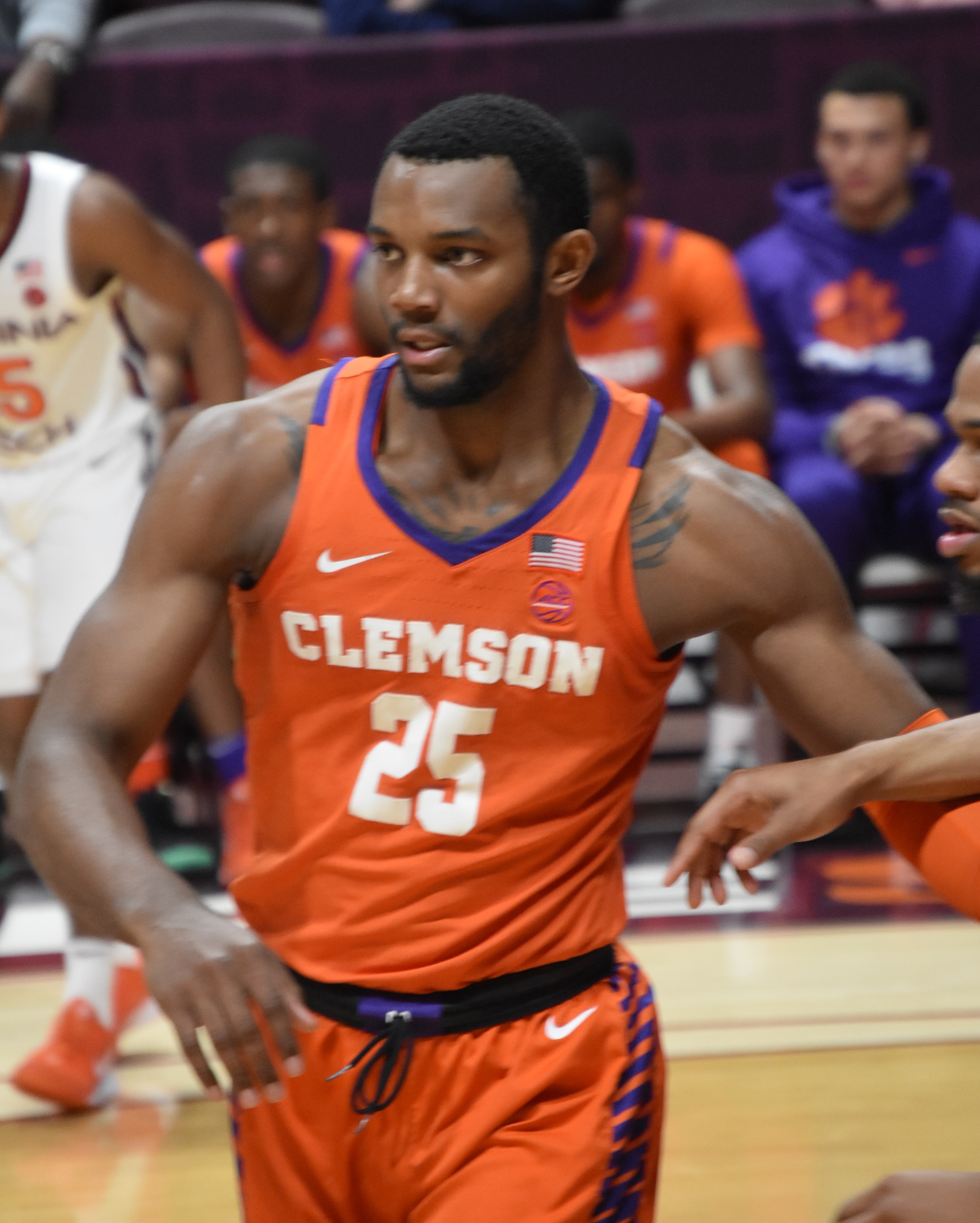
- Simms in March 2020

No. 25 – Scarborough Shooting Stars
- Position: Power forward
- League: LBA

Personal information
- Born: February 17, 1999 (age 27) East Orange, New Jersey, U.S.
- Listed height: 6 ft 8 in (2.03 m)
- Listed weight: 245 lb (111 kg)

Career information
- High school: Fluvanna County (Palmyra, Virginia); Blue Ridge School (Saint George, Virginia)
- College: Clemson (2017–2021)
- NBA draft: 2021: undrafted
- Playing career: 2021–present

Career history
- 2021–2022: Westchester Knicks
- 2022–2023: Paris Basketball
- 2023–2025: Reyer Venezia Mestre
- 2025–2026: Napoli Basket
- 2026–present: Scarborough Shooting Stars

Career highlights
- Second-team All-ACC (2021); Third-team All-ACC (2020)
- Stats at NBA.com
- Stats at Basketball Reference
Medals
Men's basketball
Representing United States
Summer Universiade
Gold medal – first place	2019 Italy	Team competition

Aamir Earl Simms (born February 17, 1999) is an American professional basketball player for Scarborough Shooting Stars of the Canadian Elite Basketball League (CEBL). He played college basketball for the Clemson Tigers.

== Early life and high school career ==
Simms spent his early childhood in East Orange, New Jersey, but moved to Palmyra, Virginia, in 2008 after his mother, Lateasha Jones, decided East Orange was too dangerous. He spent hours on the basketball court near the family's home, often playing deep into the night. He scored 377 points as a freshman at Fluvanna County High School. At an AAU Tournament, his performance drew the attention of Cade Lemcke, coach at the Blue Ridge School, and Simms decided to attend the school after receiving a scholarship. He helped the team win a state championship as a sophomore. As a senior at Blue Ridge, Simms averaged 13.0 points and 9.4 rebounds per game. He helped the team win a second state title, contributing 16 points and 10 rebounds in the championship game against Miller. He was named the Central Virginia Player of the Year. He committed to playing college basketball at Clemson over offers from more than a dozen schools.

== College career ==
Simms averaged 4.0 points, 3.2 rebounds and 0.9 blocks per game as a freshman. He helped Clemson reach the Sweet 16 of the NCAA Tournament before losing to Kansas, 80–76. As a sophomore, Simms averaged 8.1 points and 4.6 rebounds per game. On November 5, 2019, Simms had his first double-double with 12 points and 15 rebounds in a 67–60 loss to Virginia Tech. He was named ACC Co-Player of the Week (alongside Tre Jones) on January 13, 2020, after leading Clemson in points (20), rebounds (8), assists (6), blocks (4) and steals (3) in Clemson's first-ever win at North Carolina, and hit a three-pointer with 3.5 seconds left in regulation to send the game to overtime. On January 14, Simms scored a career-high 25 points to go along with nine rebounds in a 79–72 win over third-ranked Duke. As a junior, he averaged 13.0 points, 7.2 rebounds and 2.6 assists per game, earning Third Team All-ACC honors. Following the season, he declared for the 2020 NBA draft. He withdrew from the draft on June 1, returning for his senior season. He averaged 13.4 points, 6.4 rebounds and 2.7 assists per game, winning Second Team All-ACC honors. He declared for the 2021 NBA draft and hired an agent, forgoing his final season of eligibility granted by the NCAA as a result of the COVID-19 pandemic.

== Professional career ==
After being undrafted in the 2021 NBA draft, Simms joined the New York Knicks for the 2021 NBA Summer League and averaged 3.8 points and 2.8 rebounds per game. On August 19, 2021, he signed with the Knicks. However, he was waived on October 16. In October 2021, he joined the Westchester Knicks as an affiliate player. He averaged 11.3 points and 5.4 rebounds per game. On July 29, 2022, he signed with Paris Basketball of the LNB Pro A.

On July 19, 2023, he signed with Reyer Venezia Mestre of the Italian Lega Basket Serie A (LBA).

On July 19, 2025, he signed with Napoli Basket of the Italian Lega Basket Serie A (LBA).

On May 5, 2026, Simms signed with the Scarborough Shooting Stars of the Canadian Elite Basketball League (CEBL).

== National team career ==
Simms was a part of the Clemson team chosen to represent the United States in the 2019 Summer Universiade in Italy. The US received a gold medal after defeating Ukraine in the title game behind 12 points from Simms. He played in all six games and led the team in scoring and rebounding with 15.2 points and 9.8 rebounds per game.

== Career statistics ==
Legend
GP	Games played	GS	Games started	MPG	Minutes per game
FG%	Field goal percentage	3P%	3-point field goal percentage	FT%	Free throw percentage
RPG	Rebounds per game	APG	Assists per game	SPG	Steals per game
BPG	Blocks per game	PPG	Points per game	**Bold**	Career high

=== College ===
Year	Team	GP	GS	MPG	FG%	3P%	FT%	RPG	APG	SPG	BPG	PPG
2017–18	Clemson	**34**	12	15.4	.473	.326	.577	3.2	.6	.2	**.9**	4.0
2018–19	Clemson	**34**	**34**	26.6	.441	.331	.750	4.6	1.0	.6	.7	8.1
2019–20	Clemson	30	30	**31.6**	.474	**.400**	.705	**7.2**	2.6	**1.0**	.8	13.0
2020–21	Clemson	24	24	29.7	**.532**	**.400**	**.825**	6.4	**2.7**	.9	.7	**13.4**
Career		122	100	25.3	.481	.362	.730	5.2	1.6	.7	.8	9.2
