= Nahor, Virginia =

Unincorporated community in Virginia, United States

Coordinates: 37°54′32″N 78°20′53″W

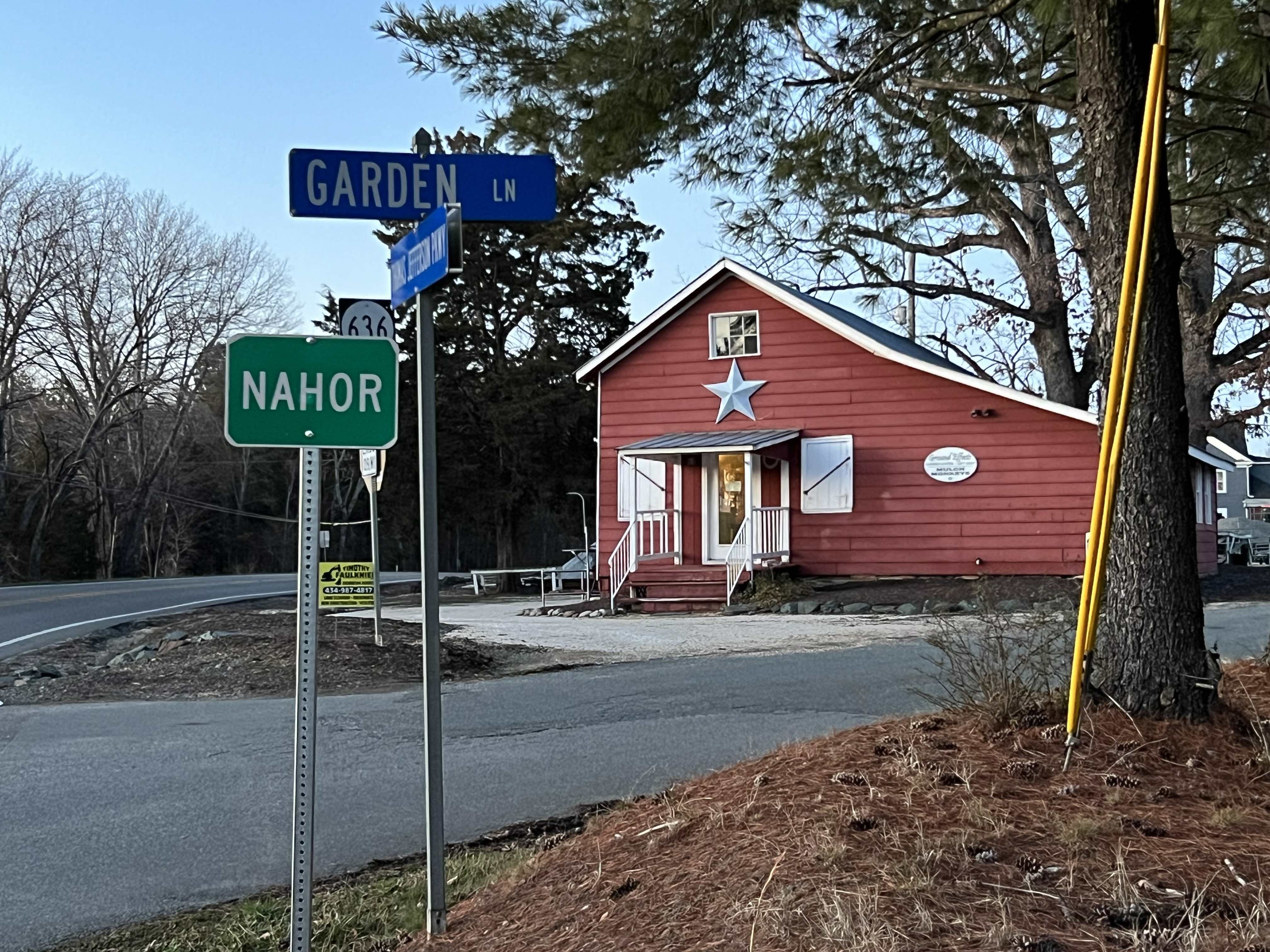
Nahor, Virginia storefront.

Nahor is an unincorporated community in Fluvanna County, in the U.S. state of Virginia. Nahor lies approximately 6 miles (9.7 km) from the county seat of Palmyra.

== History ==
Nahor's population was 22 in 1940.
