= Cloverdale, Fluvanna County, Virginia =

Unincorporated community in Virginia, United States

Coordinates: 37°45′02″N 78°14′09″W

Cloverdale, Fluvanna County is an unincorporated community in Fluvanna County, in the U.S. state of Virginia. Cloverdale has historically been an African American community.
