= Strathouse, Virginia =

Unincorporated community in Virginia, United States

Coordinates: 37°43′26″N 78°19′55″W

Strathouse is an unincorporated community in Fluvanna County, in the U.S. state of Virginia.
