= Payne, Virginia =

Unincorporated community in Virginia, United States

Coordinates: 37.75264°N 78.44223°W

Payne is an unincorporated community in Fluvanna County, in the U.S. state of Virginia.
