= Point of Fork Plantation =

Historic house in Virginia, United States

- U.S. National Register of Historic Places
- Virginia Landmarks Register
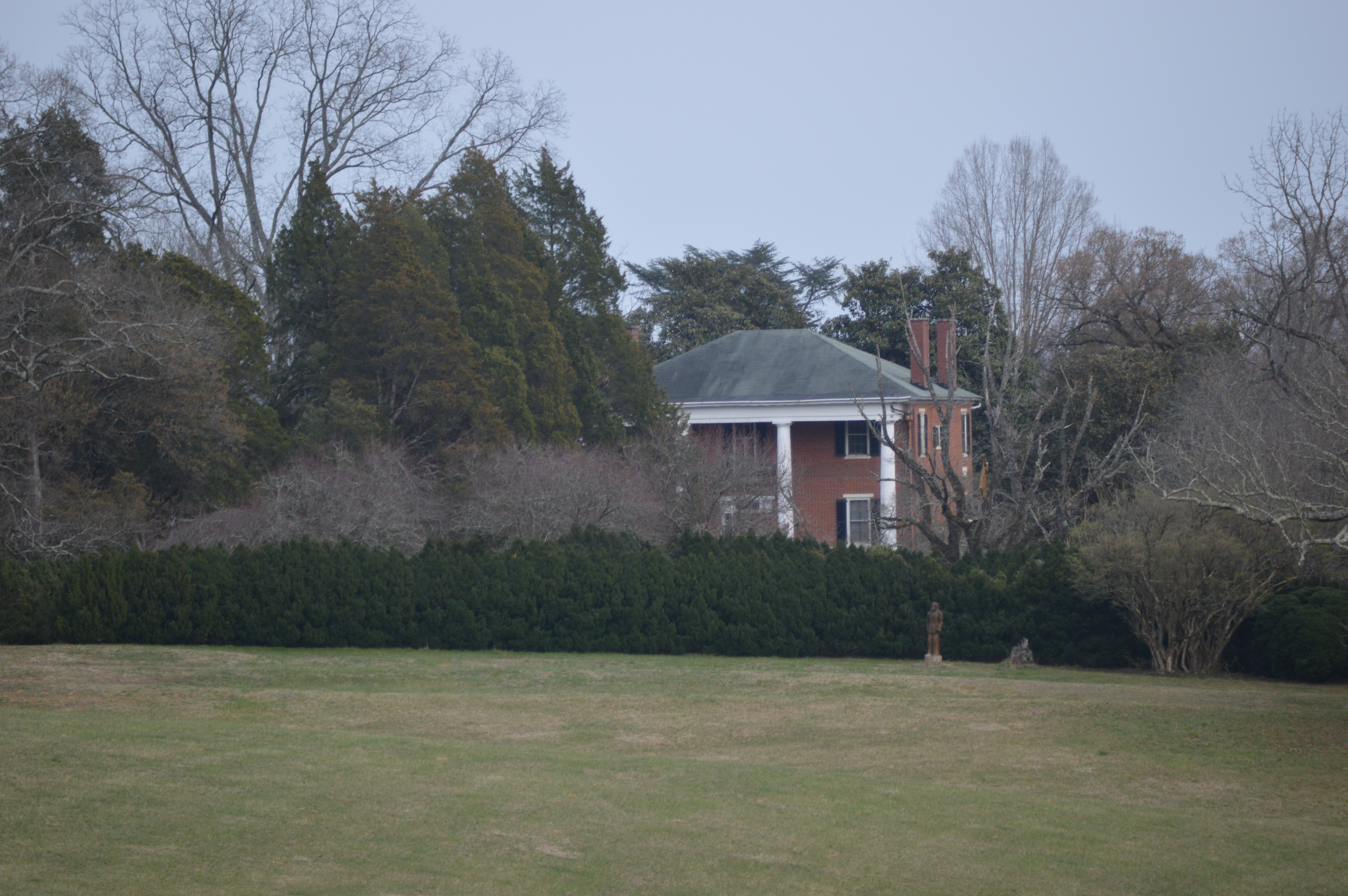
- Plantation house

- Location within Virginia Location within the United States
- Location: West of Columbia off VA 624, near Columbia, Virginia
- Coordinates: 37°45′07″N 78°10′34″W
- Area: 265 acres (107 ha)
- Built: c. 1830
- Built by: James Galt
- Architectural style: Greek Revival
- NRHP reference No.: 74002116
- VLR No.: 032-0024

Significant dates
- Added to NRHP: August 13, 1974
- Designated VLR: April 16, 1974

Point of Fork Plantation is a historic plantation house and farm located near Columbia, Fluvanna County, Virginia. The main house was built about 1830, and is a two-story, five-bay, brick dwelling in the Greek Revival style. It measures 50 feet by 40 feet and is topped by a shallow hipped roof with balustrade. The front facade features a large two-story tetrastyle Greek Doric order portico. Also on the property are a contributing servant's house and office. The house is a twin of Glen Arvon, as they were built by brothers William and James Galt. In March 1865, Federal troops under General Philip Sheridan occupied the plantation and Sheridan set up headquarters in the house.

It was listed on the National Register of Historic Places in 1974.
