= Fluvanna County High School =

Public high school in Virginia, US

Coordinates: 37°52′20.06″N 78°17′54.71″W

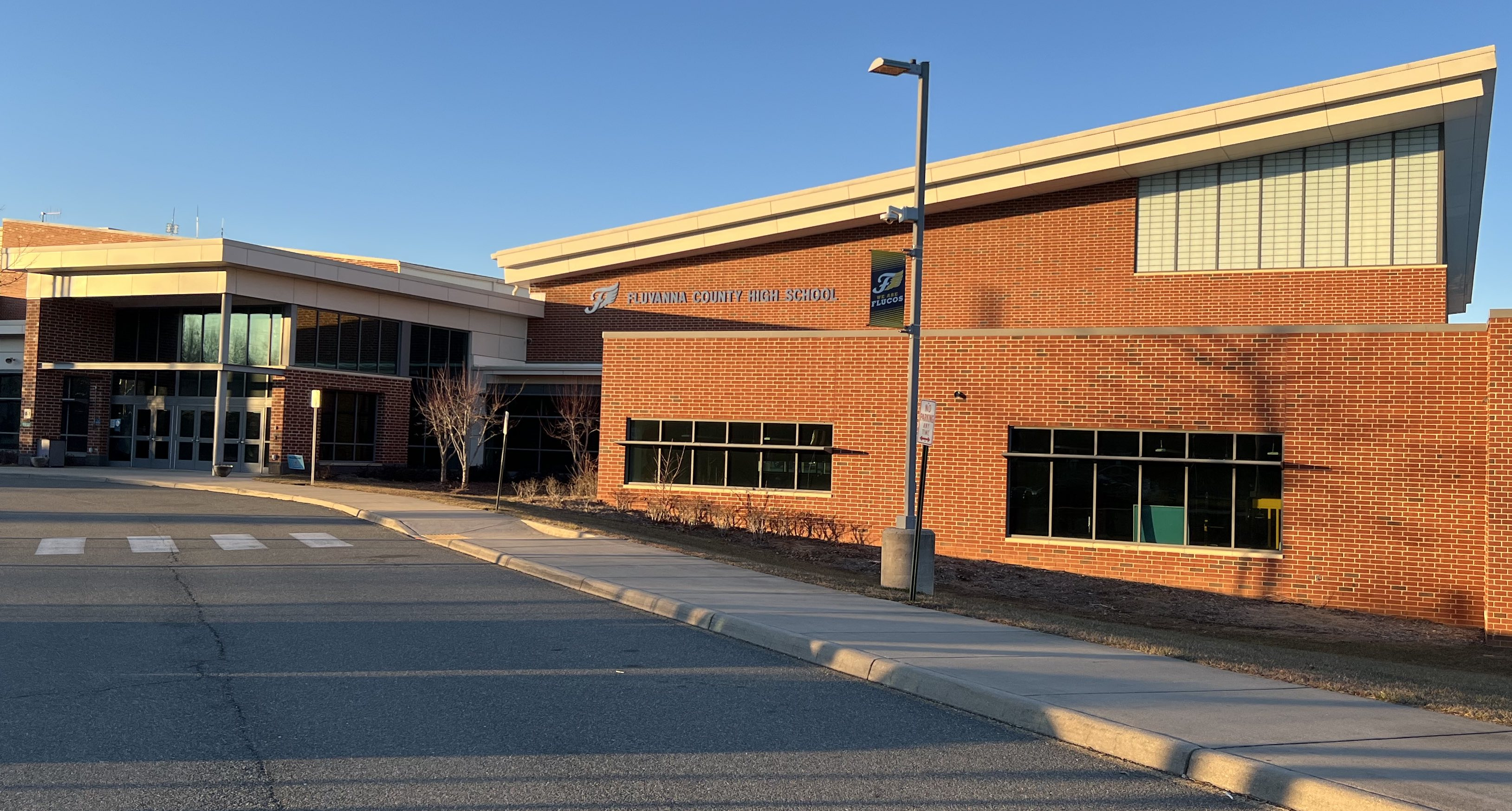

Location
- 1918 Thomas Jefferson Parkway; Palmyra, Virginia 22963; United States

Information
- School type: Public high school
- Motto: Tens Only Season
- Established: 1934
- Principal: Margo Bruce
- Teaching staff: 102.00 (FTE)
- Grades: 8–12
- Enrollment: 1,488 (2022–23)
- Student to teacher ratio: 14.59
- Colors: Navy and gold
- Athletics: VHSL Group 3A West Region; Jefferson District
- Team name: Flying Flucos
- Website: fluco.org

Fluvanna County High School is a public school about two miles west of Palmyra, Virginia, on Virginia State Route 53. It opened in 1934 as one of the first county consolidated high schools in Virginia. The school is noted for its unique nickname, the Flying Flucos, a nickname carried by all Fluvanna schools.

== History ==
The original Fluvanna County High School was located in Carysbrook, Virginia. The Carysbrook campus was renovated in the 1980s and now serves as the offices of the Fluvanna County Social Services Department, and a community center with an auditorium for performing arts. The Fluvanna County Department of Parks and Recreation administers the original school gym and playing fields.

The Fluvanna County School Division integrated in 1969 and the high school became known as Fluvanna Senior High School (grades 10–12). The former Abrams High School became Fluvanna Junior High School (grades 8 and 9).

In the summer of 1976, a new Fluvanna County High School opened adjacent to the old Abrams High School (Fluvanna Junior High) near Palmyra. This school campus, now Fluvanna Middle School, has had many additions constructed and renovations since the original construction in 1975.

In 2009 the Fluvanna County School Board approved the building of a new Fluvanna County High School on the Pleasant Grove property on the Rivanna River near Palmyra. The new school at Pleasant Grove opened in 2012.

== Flying Flucos ==
Fluvanna began playing football in Fall 1934, with the opening of the consolidated high school at Carysbrook. In 1948 Fluvanna County was one of the few teams in Virginia that was playing high school football. The 1949 Fluvanna County High School Yearbook, the Fluvannual, makes first reference to the nickname Flying Flucos. As written in the yearbook, "Our next game on November 12 was the pride of the 'Flying Flucos'. Rated as underdogs in this game between Fluvanna and Manchester, the Flucos racked up a touchdown, a safety, and an extra point, to edge Manchester 9–6. This is the team, incidentally, that led to the name, 'Flying Flucos.'" Prior to this a newspaper article was written that referenced "The Flying Men of Flu.Co." (an attempt to abbreviate Fluvanna County). The students at Fluvanna County High School embraced "Flying Flucos" and it has been the nickname ever since.

The first attempt to create a visual image of the Flying Flucos mascot was Mercury's Winged Sandals that appeared in the 1950s–1960s. The winged sandals were said to be made of imperishable gold and they flew the gods as swift as any bird. Students at version 2 of the school (now middle school), adjoining S. C. Abrams school, referred to the gym as the "Shoebox", while anchoring the school's morning television show. The Old English script Flying F with wings is now the Flying Fluco logo. Over the years many efforts to make a superhero-type character the Flying Fluco mascot were attempted but all never gathered much support. Recently a caped "Flucoman" mascot has appeared.

== Activities ==
=== Athletics and activities ===
The Flying Flucos participated in the Virginia State High School League (VHSL) Group A James River District during the 1970s and 1980s, with traditional rivals Buckingham, Goochland, Amelia, Cumberland, Prince Edward, Powhatan and Lunenburg Central. In the 1990s, as enrollment for the high school grew, the Flying Flucos moved to the AA Jefferson District with Charlottesville, Orange, William Monroe, Goochland, Powhatan, Louisa, Monticello, and Western Albemarle. The Flying Flucos continued to schedule traditional rivals, such as Buckingham, as schedules allowed. Fluvanna's VHSL classification is now Division 3, Region 3C, offering cheerleading, competition cheerleading, cross country (boys and girls), football, golf, and volleyball in the fall season; basketball (boys and girls), cheerleading, indoor track and field (boys and girls), swim and dive (boys and girls), and wrestling in the winter season; and baseball, lacrosse (boys and girls), outdoor track and field (boys and girls), soccer (boys and girls), softball, and tennis (boys and girls) in the spring season. Also under the VHSL's guidance, Fluvanna County competes in forensics and scholastic bowl.

From 1934 - 1975 the football team played at Carysbrook. A new high school was opened in the Fall of 1975, that now serves as the County middle school. The football stadium at the Middle School was named Costello Stadium in 1981, after Charles Costello who was the football coach for twenty-two years (1938-1959). The Pleasant Grove football field, the current field is named Phil Browning Field, after Phil Browning who was the football coach for sixteen years (1968-1983). Browning led Fluvanna to two State Football Championship appearances in 1970 (loss to Chilhowie) and 1981 (loss to JJ Kelley).

The basketball program won state championships during the 1980s and early 1990s to include the boys Group A title in 1989 and 1990. as well as a Group AA Div. 3 Final Four appearances in 2012.

In 2019, the Flying Flucos Baseball team won the 3A State Baseball title.

=== Marching band ===
The Fluvanna County Marching Flucos won first place in the USSBA National Band Competition in Single-A bands in 2006.

== Notable alumni ==
- Chris Daughtry – contestant on American Idol and founder of rock band Daughtry.
