= Glen Arvon =

Historic house in Virginia, United States

- U.S. National Register of Historic Places
- Virginia Landmarks Register
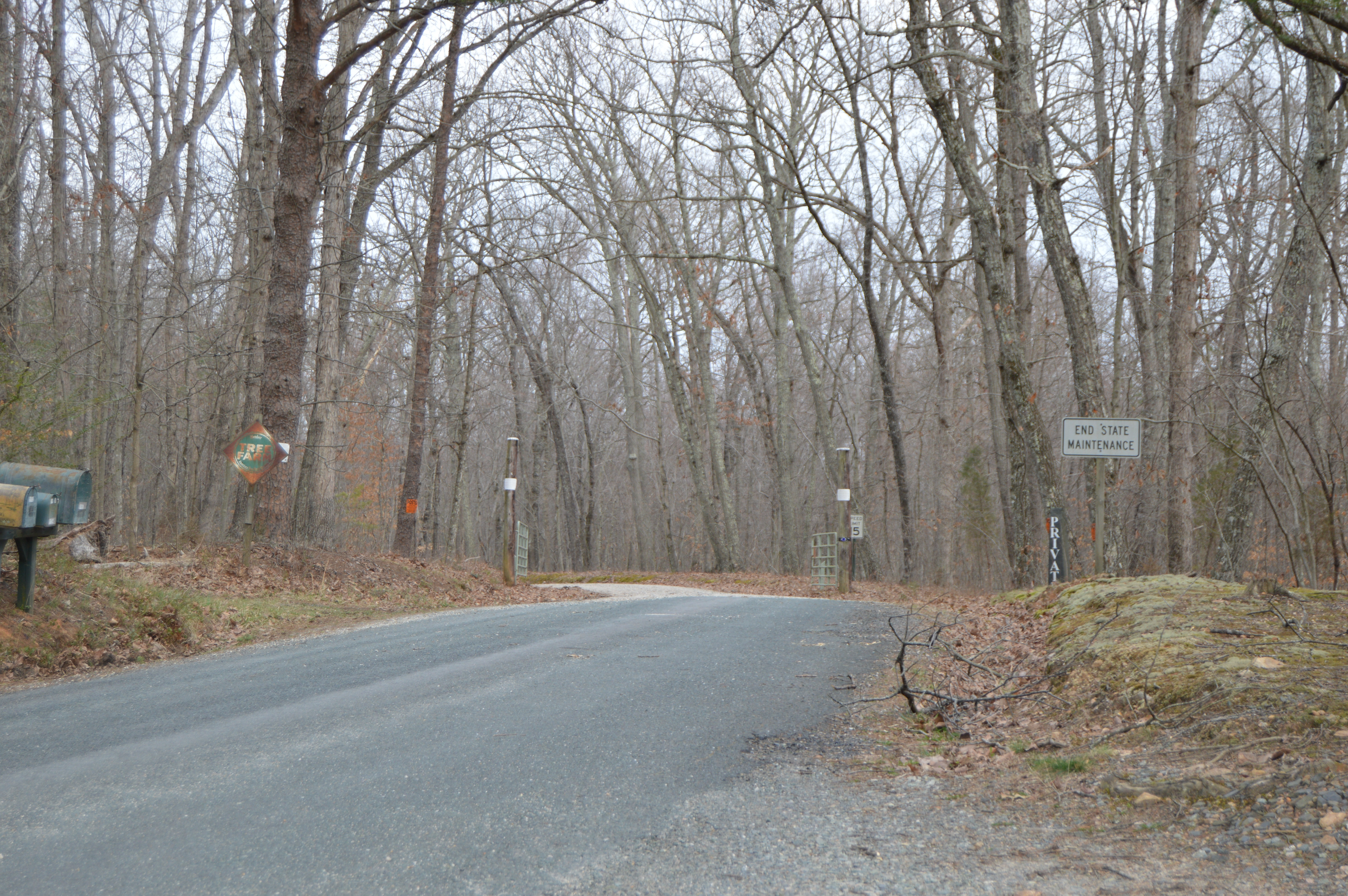
- Property entrance

- Location within Virginia Location within the United States
- Location: East of Bremo Bluff near the junction of VA 655 and VA 656, near Bremo Bluff, Virginia
- Coordinates: 37°42′15″N 78°14′48″W
- Area: 1,187 acres (480 ha)
- Built: 1836
- Architectural style: Greek Revival, Federal
- NRHP reference No.: 76002106
- VLR No.: 032-0015

Significant dates
- Added to NRHP: May 28, 1976
- Designated VLR: December 16, 1975

Glen Arvon, originally known as Glenarvon, is a historic plantation house and farm located near Bremo Bluff, Fluvanna County, Virginia. The main house was built in 1836, and is a two-story, five-bay, brick dwelling in the Greek Revival style. It measures 50 feet by 40 feet and is topped by a shallow hipped roof with balustrade. The front facade features a two-story Greek Doric order portico. Also on the property is the contributing two-story, brick servant's house. The house is a twin of Point of Fork, as they were built by brothers William and James Galt.

It was listed on the National Register of Historic Places in 1976.
