= Gum Creek (Virginia) =

Historic house in Virginia, United States

- U.S. National Register of Historic Places
- Virginia Landmarks Register
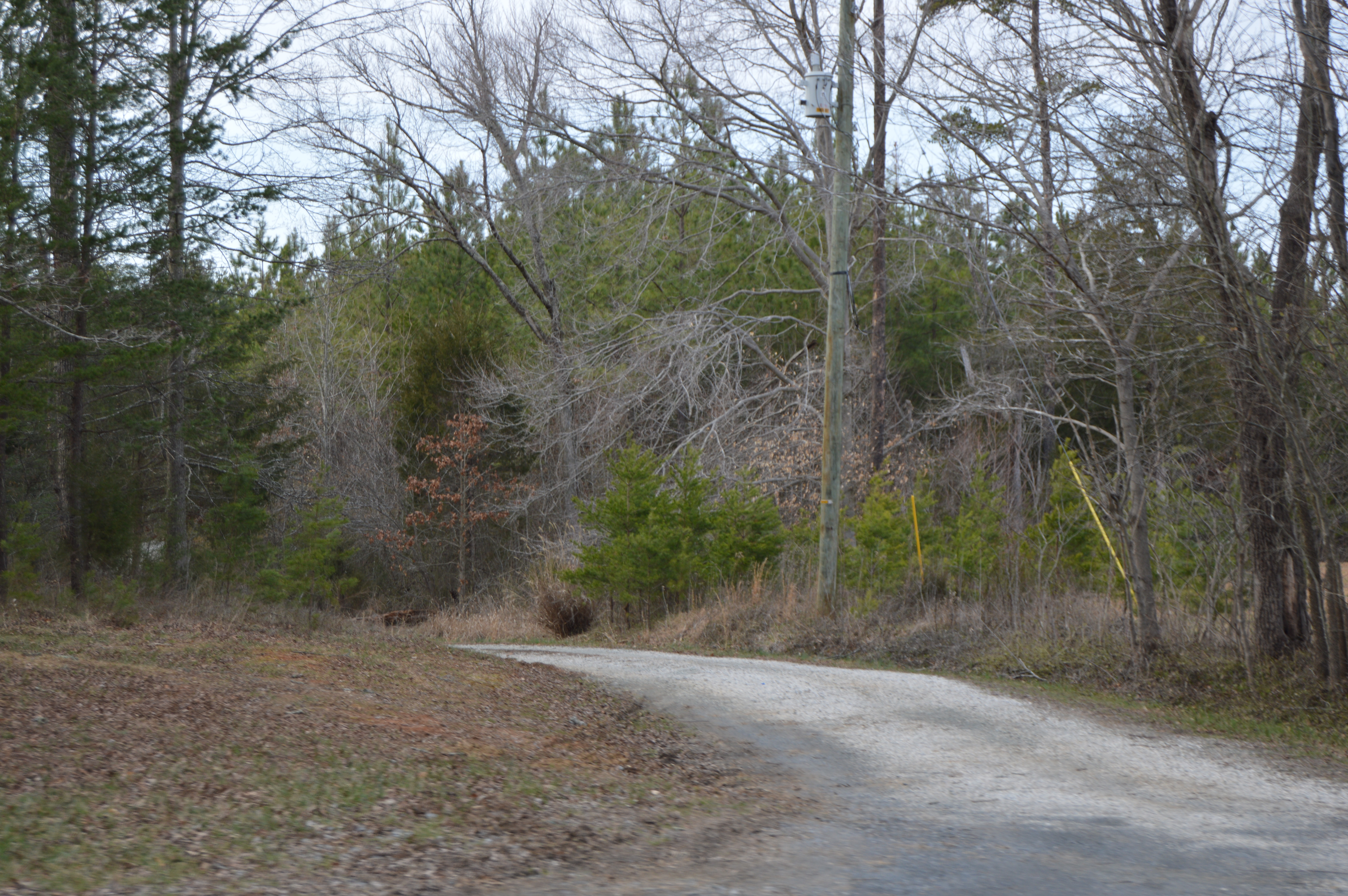
- Property entrance

- Location within Virginia Location within the United States
- Location: 1317 Stage Junction Rd., near Columbia, Virginia
- Coordinates: 37°46′29″N 78°09′33″W
- Area: 33.1 acres (13.4 ha)
- Built: c. 1797
- Built by: Ross, James, D. and David
- Architectural style: Early Republic, I-house
- NRHP reference No.: 03001084
- VLR No.: 032-0046

Significant dates
- Added to NRHP: October 22, 2003
- Designated VLR: June 18, 2003

Gum Creek is a historic home located near Columbia, Fluvanna County, Virginia. It was built about 1797, and is a 1 1/2-story, three-bay, center passage plan frame dwelling on a stone foundation. Two one-story, shed roofed additions were built after 1839. It features unpainted original interior woodwork, a basement kitchen and stone and brick end chimneys. Also on the property are a contributing smokehouse, buggy shed, and the original stone-enclosed spring.

It was listed on the National Register of Historic Places in 2003.
