= Rassawek =

Native American archaeological site in Virginia

- Russawmeake
- Location within Virginia Location within the United States
- 37°45′2″N 78°10′7″W
- Cultures: Monacan Indian Nation
- Location: Fluvanna County, Virginia, United States

History
- Abandoned: Early 18th century

Rassawek is an archaeological site in Fluvanna County, Virginia, located at the confluence of the James River and its tributary, the Rivanna River, near Columbia. The site was previously a village that served as the capital for the Monacans, a Native American tribe, during the early period of British colonization of the Americas.

British colonists were first made aware of the village during a 1607 expedition from Jamestown up the James River, though there is no evidence that any Europeans ever visited the village. By the early 18th century, the village was seemingly abandoned and British, and later American, establishments were created around the area, including the Point of Fork Arsenal and the nearby community of Columbia. While the exact location of the Rassawek village is not known with complete certainty, archaeological digs conducted by the Smithsonian Institution in the 1880s and during construction of a gasoline pipeline in the 1980s indicate that the village was most likely on the right bank of the Rivanna, in the strip of land separating the two rivers.

In the early 21st century, the county governments of both Fluvanna and Louisa made plans to construct a water pumping station at the Rassawek site, prompting outcry from the Monacan Indian Nation, which had gained federal recognition in 2018. Over the next several years, the Nation and other individuals and organizations, such as Preservation Virginia, pushed back against the development plans, and in 2020, the National Trust for Historic Preservation added the site to its 2020 list of America's Most Endangered Places. Following this, in 2022, the counties agreed to pursue a new location and develop the station at a site upstream of Rassawek.

== Site ==
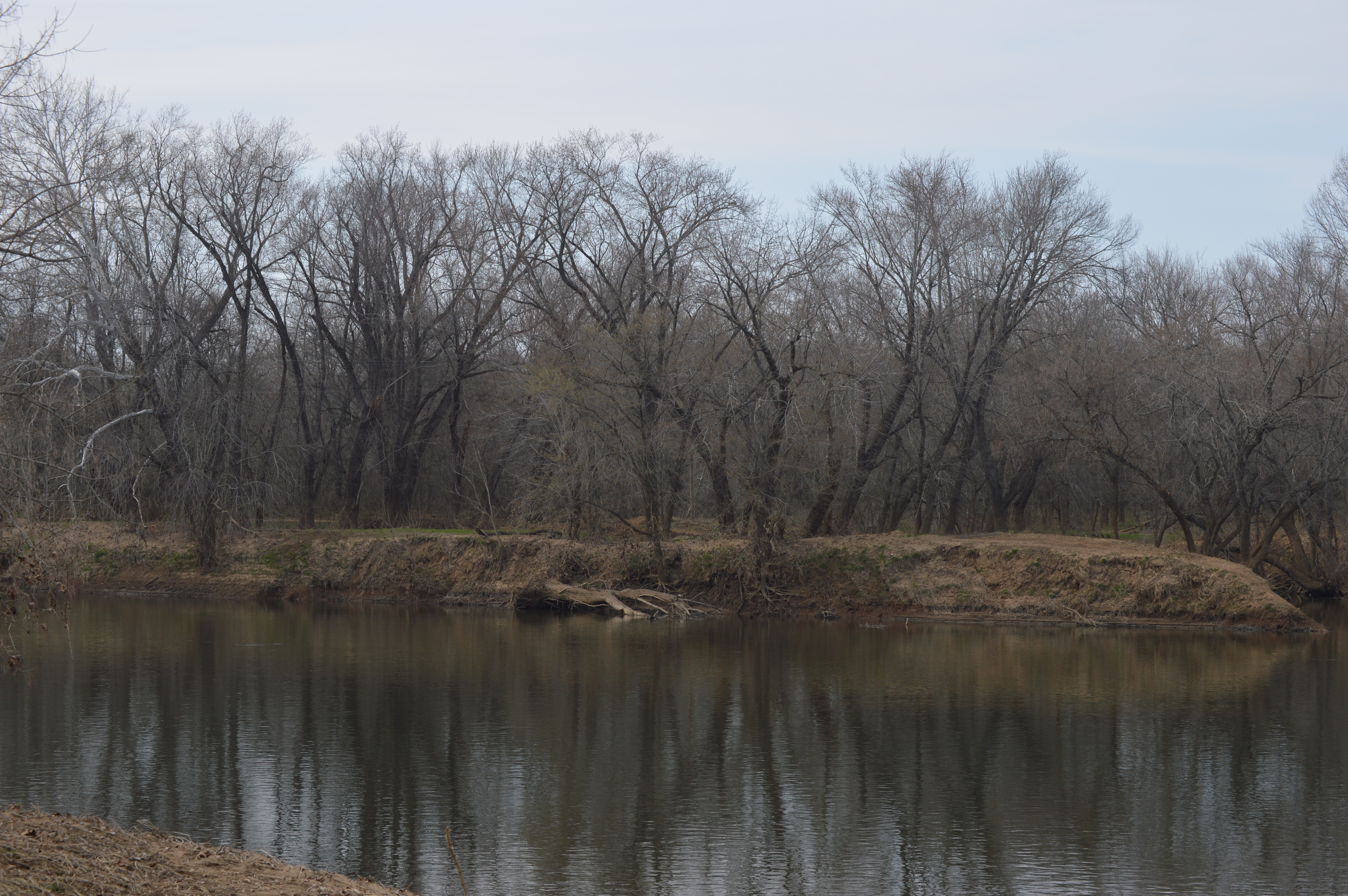
Confluence of the James River and the Rivanna River, pictured 2018

The site is located near the community of Columbia, in Fluvanna County, near where the Rivanna River flows into the James River. This area is also known as the "Point of Fork". It is located approximately 45 miles (72 km) west of the state capital of Richmond, which is roughly a 1-hour drive from the city. According to a 1930 article by historian David I. Bushnell Jr., the exact location of the village was unknown, though it was likely been situated on the right bank of the Rivanna, near the river mouth, at the confluence of the two rivers. In the 1880s, archaeological excavations at the location by researchers from the Smithsonian Institution uncovered burial grounds and evidence of buildings, and further digs in the 1980s unearthed several Native American artifacts at the site. According to a 2024 article in The Daily Progress of Charlottesville, this later dig, conducted by the Virginia Department of Historic Resources (VDHR) in 1980, "officially pinpointed Rassawek's location" at the Point of Fork.

== History ==
=== Early history ===
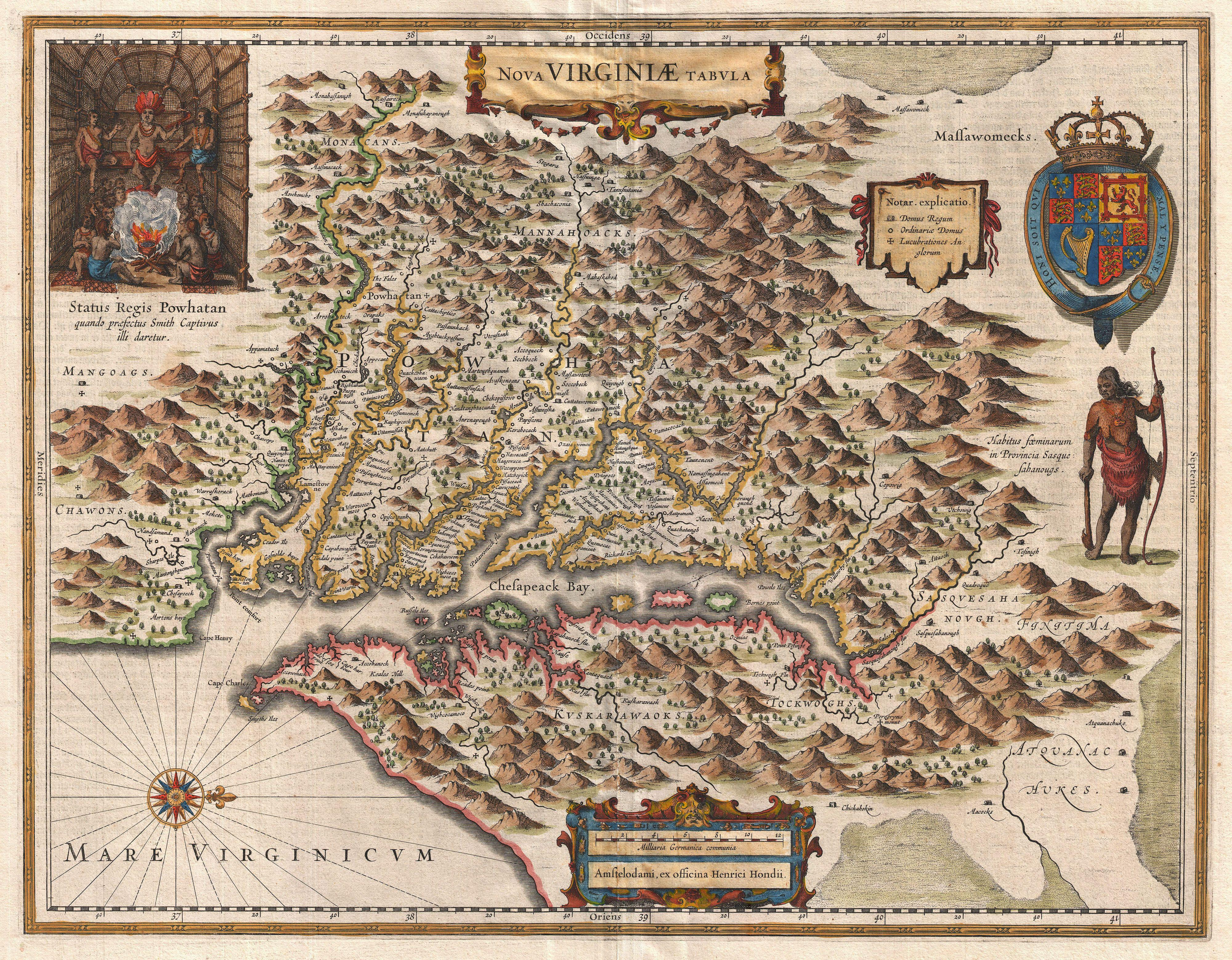
Rassawek is present near the top left corner of this 1630 map of Virginia, created by Jodocus Hondius.

The establishment was first recorded by British colonists during a May 1607 expedition that started at Jamestown and followed the James River to the Atlantic Seaboard Fall Line, at what is today the city of Richmond. Based on descriptions from Powhatan's son, Captain John Smith created a map, published in 1612, showing what is now Central and Western Virginia, including the location of five Monacan villages. The Monacans were a large Native American tribe with a population of roughly 10,000 that at the time inhabited a large swath of modern-day Virginia, stretching from the Blue Ridge Mountains in the west to the Fall Line in the east.

One of the villages identified on the map was Rassawek, the capital of the Monacans to which all other Monacan villages in the area paid tribute, which was described as being a roughly 1.5-day march from present-day Richmond. According to Bushnell, a common alternative spelling of the village is "Russawmeake". At the time of Smith's expedition, the village was home to roughly 1,500 people and was a major center for regional trade and commerce, (Note: This exact number comes from a book on Native Americans in Virginia written by historian Ben C. McCary. A 2020 article in The Washington Post gives a less exact estimate that Rassawek "could have housed hundreds of people".) and was a central meeting point of the Monacan tribe, which is estimated to have had around 15,000 people, according to Scottsville Museum. The village was home to a 60-foot (18 m) longhouse and a minimum of a dozen roundhouses. Radiocarbon dating shows evidence of human occupation of the site dating back 5,340 years from 2019, as early as around 3000 BCE, while articles published on VPM.org in 2022 describe the village as having been the capital of the Monacans for several hundred, or possibly several thousand, years.

=== Colonial era through the 19th century ===
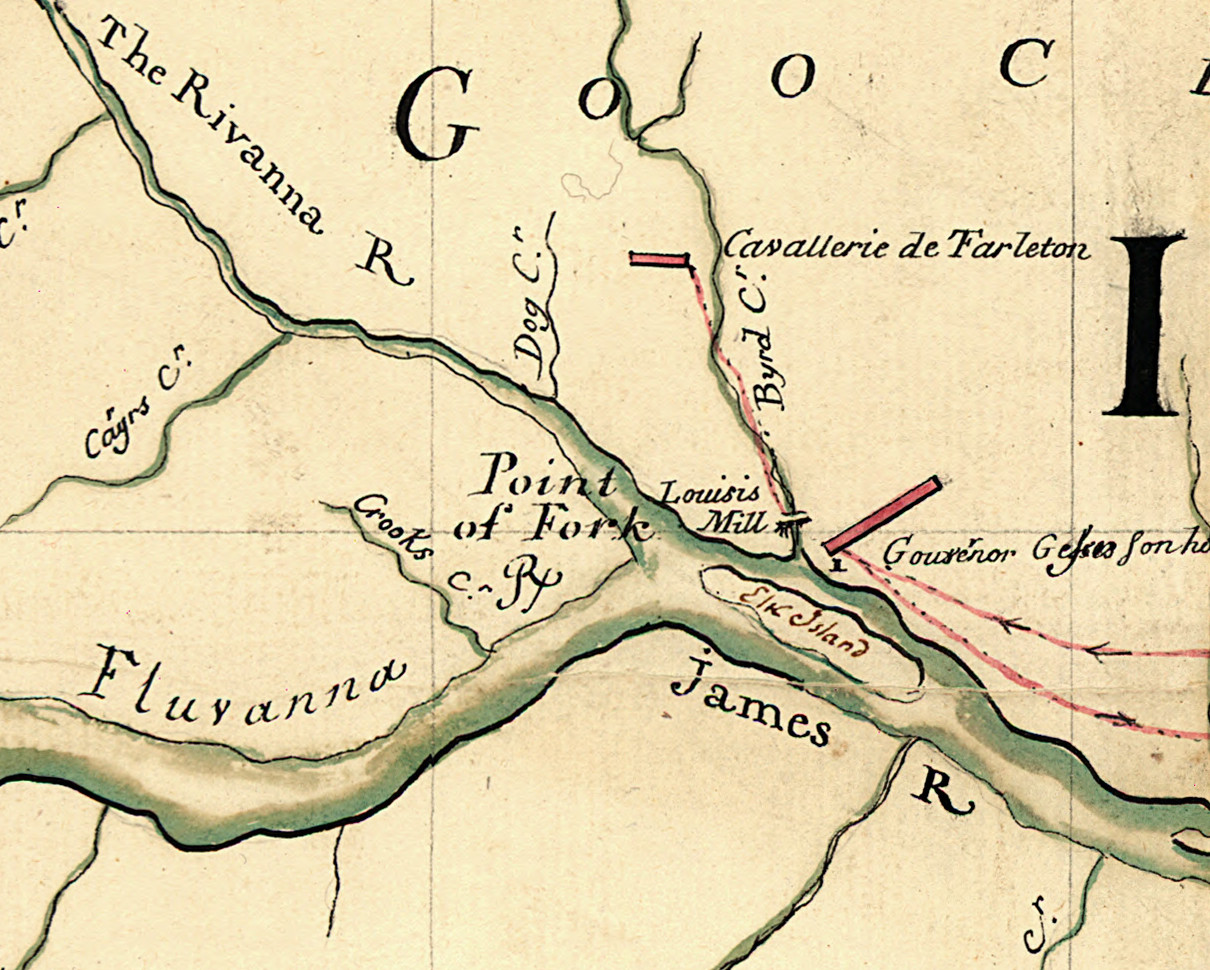
1781 map by Michel Capitaine du Chesnoy showing the Point of Fork area

During the European colonization of the Americas, the Monacans were dispersed from their traditional homeland and resettled in other locations, including modern-day North Carolina and Tennessee. The site was abandoned before white people settled the region near the fork, and it is not known if any Europeans visited the site while it was still an active Monacan village. (Note: In a 1930 article published in the Smithsonian Miscellaneous Collections, historian David I. Bushnell Jr. wrote, "No account has been discovered of a European having visited the village of Rassawek". Additionally, a 1977 article published in The Bulletin of the Fluvanna County Historical Society states, "We do not know when the first white men saw the Fork".) According to Bushnell, Rassawek was an important Monacan village through the early 17th century but had "ceased to be [an] important [settlement]" by the beginning of the 18th century. Around this time, the land including the point was owned by Dudley Diggs, who built slave quarters there. As a teenager, Thomas Jefferson recruited several landowners in the region to clear channels as part of a project to improve navigability on the Rivanna. By the time of the American Revolution, the land was owned by David Ross, a Scottish-born merchant, who continued agricultural operations there. During the American Revolutionary War, the government of Virginia established the Point of Fork Arsenal at the fork, which operated as the state's main arsenal until its closure in 1801. Following the war, the nearby community of Columbia became a hub for bateau transport, though periodic river floods contributed to a decline in the settlement's fortune. In the 1880s, archaeological excavations conducted by the Smithsonian Institution unearthed several burial grounds at the site.

=== Late 20th century ===
In 1980, construction work on a gasoline pipeline through the area unearthed several Native American artifacts, prompting the state government to temporarily halt the construction while the area was surveyed. Archeological testing during the 1980s revealed human remains. According to several historians, the discoveries confirmed the location of Rassawek, similar to how, in 1977, the site of the Powhatan capital of Werowocomoco was discovered in Gloucester County. Speaking of the Rassawek site, Jeffrey Hantman, a historian from the University of Virginia who specialized in Native American history, said, "It is highly likely that there are many more burials associated with this Chief's village". However, whereas the Werowocomoco was preserved, construction on the supposed Rassawek site was allowed to recommence, leading to the destruction of many Native American artifacts. By the 1990s, the VDHR had erected a state historical marker for Rassawek along Virginia State Route 6, roughly 0.8 miles (1.3 km) west of Columbia.

=== Proposed water pumping station ===
In 2014, the James River Water Authority (JRWA), a joint venture entity chartered by the county governments of both Fluvanna and Louisa County in 2009, announced plans to construct a water pumping station on the supposed site of Rassawek. The project was designed to supply water to Zion Crossroads, a nearby community situated in both counties near Interstate 64 that was at the time experiencing a development boom. As part of the project, the counties purchased the land around the fork and constructed a nearby water treatment plant on the other side of the Rivanna River. However, the construction of the pumping station required planning permission from the United States Army Corps of Engineers. By mid-2019, JRWA had received permission to store any bones that are discovered as part of the station's construction and was applying for permits to excavate any burial sites on the premises. Additionally, the authority had received several construction permits from the state government. According to reporting from The Washington Post, the JRWA had "kept the tribe informed" regarding the project, but the Monacans "had no official seat at the table". Marion Werkheiser, an attorney for the tribe, stated in 2019 that the Monacan Indian Nation had been in contact with JRWA and other governmental agencies concerning the project since 2017.

==== Opposition from the Monacan Indian Nation ====
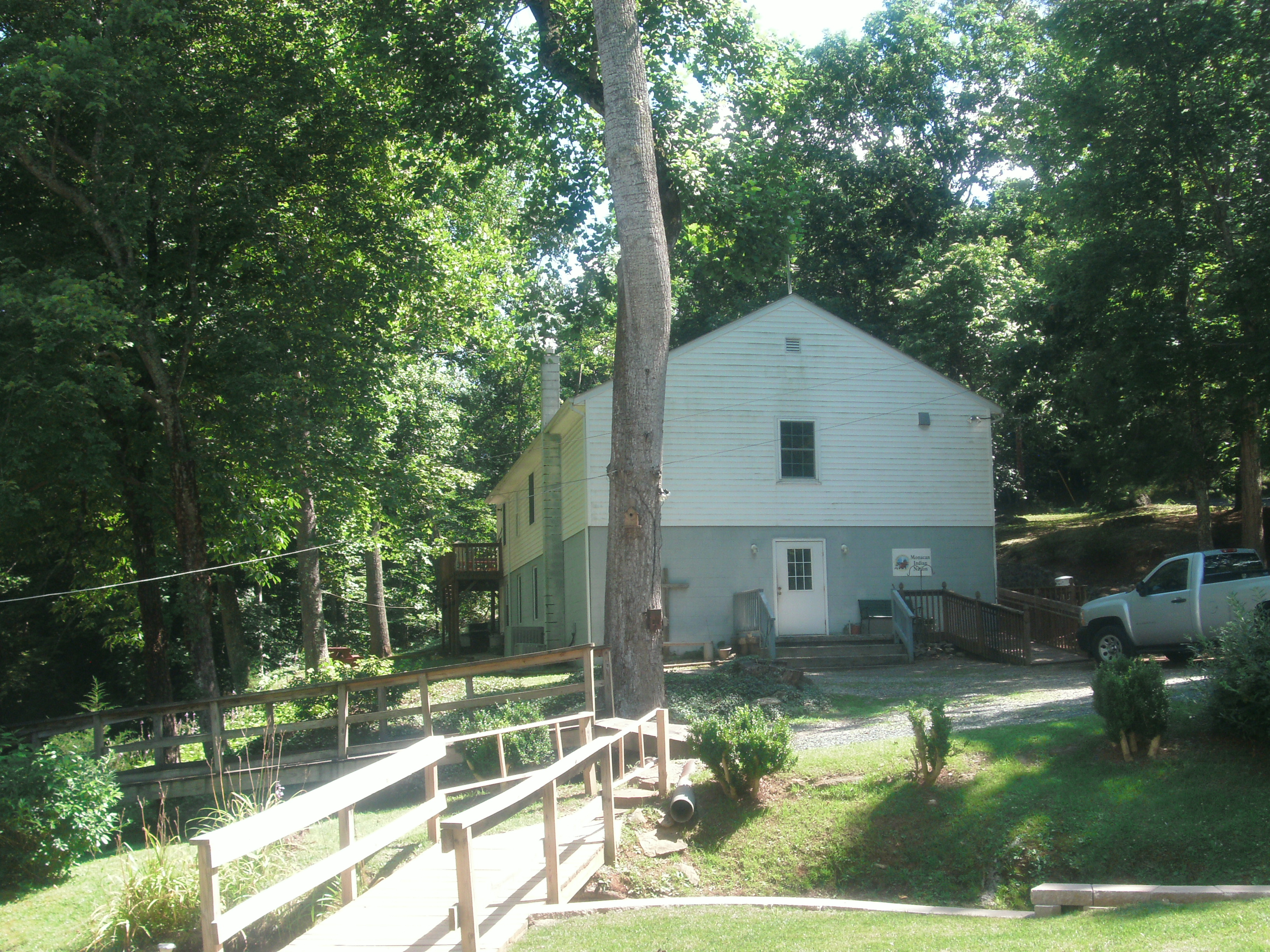
In January 2018, the Monacan Indian Nation (headquarters pictured 2016) became a federally recognized tribe in the United States.

In January 2018, United States President Donald Trump signed into law a bill that extended federal recognition to the Monacan Indian Nation, granting the tribe the right to self-governance. At the time, the tribe had a membership of over 2,000 people, including 500 in Amherst County. With their recognition by the federal government of the United States, the Monacan Indian Nation became an official consulting party in the Corps of Engineers' permit process for the pumping station. Initially, the tribe had been seeking financial compensation to assist with the reclamation of any artifacts and the reburial of any Monacan corpses discovered during the station's construction, but after getting more involved in the permit process, the tribe discovered that there were several other possible locations that the JRWA could choose for the station and began to push against any construction on the Rassawek site.

JRWA stated that the Rassawek site was the most optimal site for the pumping station due to existing infrastructure and the water purity at that location, stating that any other location along the Rivanna would not provide enough water for the station and any other location along the James downstream of the confluence would be too sediment-laden. Additionally, the authority stated that choosing a new site could set the project's schedule back by several years and either double or triple the cost. With regards to the tribe, the water authority offered to allow the Monacan Indian Nation oversight over all excavations performed at the site, grant them ownership of any Monacan artifacts exposed, and provide $125,000 in funding for improvements to the tribe's museum. Hantman, critical of the offers, called the water authority's actions "scientific colonialism".

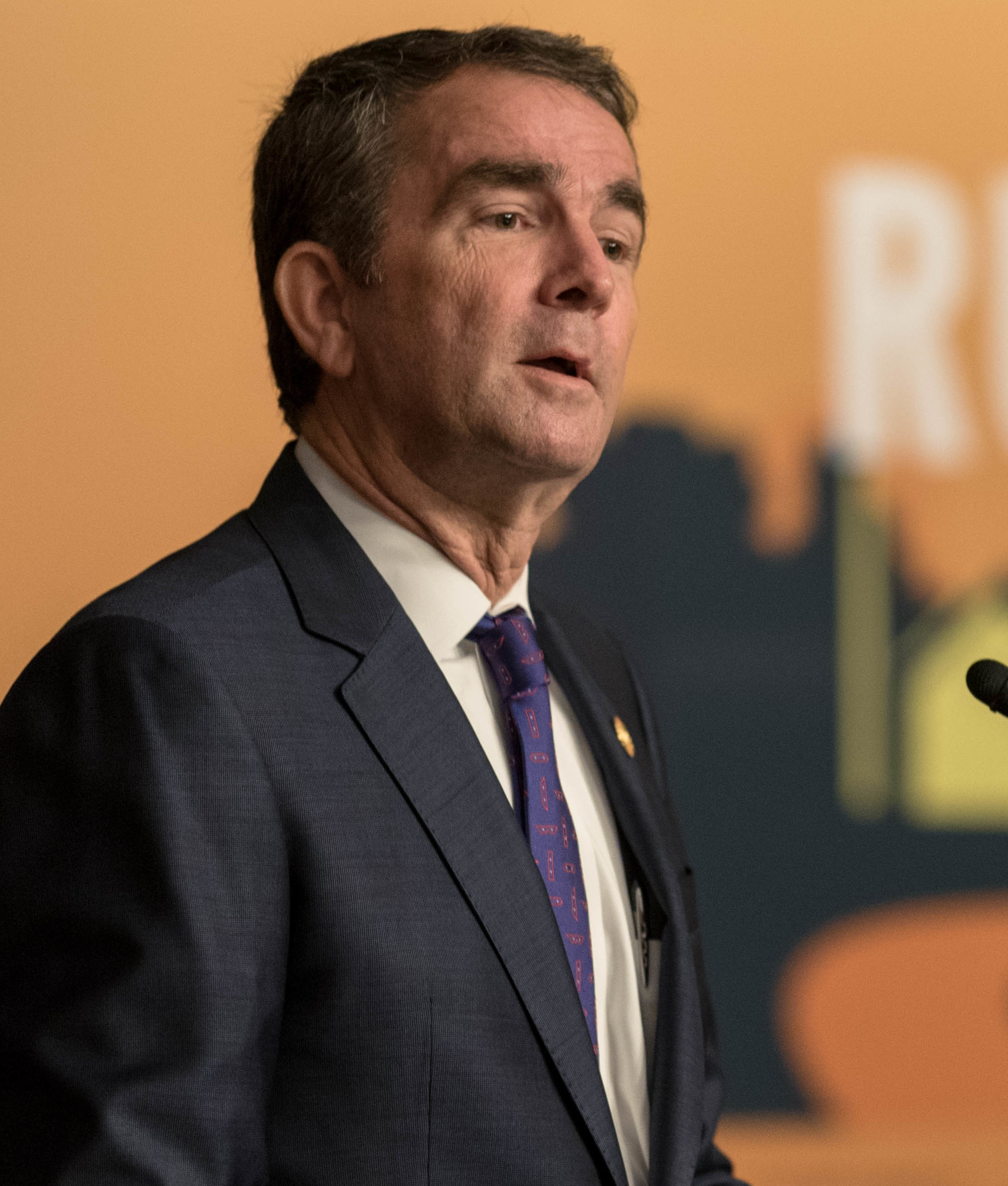
In July 2019, Virginia Governor Ralph Northam (pictured 2018) visited the Point of Fork area and spoke with members of the Monacan nation about the project.

In June 2019, acting Chief Pamela Thompson of the Monacan Indian Nation wrote an opinion piece for The Daily Progress advocating preservation of the Rassawek site. In July, at the behest of the tribe, Virginia Governor Ralph Northam visited the Rassawek site and listened to several Monacans' concerns regarding the project, and on August 13, several members of the Monacan tribe attended a public forum hosted by the water authority where they voiced their opposition to the site of the pumping station.

==== Issues stemming from the archaeological team ====
In September 2019, Julie Langan, the director of the VDHR, stated that the department would require the water authority to submit new permit applications after they discovered that Carol Tyrer, the archaeologist hired by JRWA to conduct a cultural resources survey on the Rassawek site, was not qualified to perform the work she had been hired to do. According to Langan, Tyrer lacked the appropriate academic credentials to perform the review and, as a result, the department would not issue a permit to JRWA until a new archaeologist had performed a survey of the site. In a further letter clarifying the issues, the department stated that Tyrer had misrepresented her education on her résumé. The department also stated that the water authority had failed to properly gain the permission of local landowners to access property as part of the project. Additionally, the Corps of Engineers rescinded their prior permit, stating in a letter to the water authority that they would be requiring a more stringent review process. In response, the authority stated that they would challenge the department's decision.

The following month, an employee at Tyrer's firm became a whistleblower when they stated that Tyrer had engaged in malpractice at the Rassawek site. In a letter submitted by the employee to VDHR, they alleged that Tyrer and her firm, Circa, had engaged in "illegal, unethical, unprofessional and unscientific practices by Circa in its work generally and at Point of Fork specifically", further stating,

These practices include lying to government officials, assigning unqualified and untrained personnel to perform sensitive investigations, failing to supervise unqualified personnel, misrepresenting professional and academic qualifications in official filings, falsifying research data, failing to use appropriate technology to obtain reliable data and then massaging the data to look scientific, plagiarizing the work of unaffiliated professionals, minimizing archaeological discoveries and handling cultural resources inappropriately in the field and in the laboratory.

In response, JRWA announced that they would be conducting an investigation into the archaeological firm. Following the VDHR's statements, Tyrer filed a lawsuit against the state government to challenge the department's ruling. Additionally, the Monacan Indian Nation threatened a lawsuit against the Corps of Engineers if they granted the water authority a permit to continue the project. By December 2019, the water authority was seeking an appeal on the VDHR's decision from the circuit court in Fluvanna County. In January 2020, an attorney for the JRWA announced that the authority had conducted an investigation and found no credible evidence for the claims made by Mai against Tyrer, though the Monacans remained adamant about having the county governments of Fluvanna and Louisa conduct an independent investigation into the matter. The following month, the water authority announced that, after considering several alternative locations, they would continue to pursue the Rassawek site for the pumping station.

==== Continued developments in 2020 ====
In May 2020, the statewide historic preservation nonprofit group Preservation Virginia announced that the Rassawek site would be added the organization's annual list of "Most Endangered Historic Places" in the state, with the group's CEO Elizabeth Kostelny saying, "Rassawek is important to the Monacan nation. It’s a sacred site. It’s an archaeological site. There are likely burials there. This is history that has not been forgotten by the tribe itself but forgotten about the greater community". The following month, a petition signed by 130 people associated with the University of Virginia sent to Corps of Engineers urging against development of the Rassawek site. By August, roughly 12,000 individuals or organizations had commented their opposition to the project to the Corps of Engineers, and that same month, the JRWA announced that they would be asking the Corps of Engineers to suspend their permit application temporarily as they explored other alternate sites. The following month, the National Trust for Historic Preservation added the site to its annual list of 11 of America's Most Endangered Places. In October, the JRWA stated that they were analyzing an alternate location roughly 2.3 mi (3.7 km) upstream of the confluence, with the site survey to be conducted over the course of about 4 months at a cost of roughly $155,000. Following the announcement, the Monacan Indian Nation sent a letter to the water authority expressing their support for the new location and offering to collaborate with the JRWA , provided that the Nation was able to review the plan and that digs on the site did not expose any Monacan burials.

==== Developments in 2021 and 2022 ====
In November 2021, Governor Northam signed an executive order giving federally recognized Native American tribes in Virginia more of a formal involvement in projects involving a state permit that could affect the tribes' cultural or historic resources, with a report on the order from WVTF specifically singling out the Rassawek project as an example of one such project. The following month, the site survey of the alternative location was completed, with archaeologists unearthing an arrowhead, several shards of pottery, and some additional evidence of human settlement, but notably did not discover any human remains or burial sites. In a statement on the findings, Werkheiser stated that the tribe would give their blessing for development at the new site. On March 15, 2022, the JRWA announced that they would be pursuing the new location for development, with the decision being finalized in a vote by members of the water authority on March 16. In addition, the JRWA agreed to transfer the parcel of land they owned to the Monacan Indian Nation.

The JRWA's decision drew positive responses from several government and nonprofit officials, including United States Senator Tim Kaine of Virginia, National Trust CEO Paul Edmondson, and several members of the Southern Environmental Law Center. Speaking of the significance of the preservation of the Rassawek site, Hantman said in a 2024 interview that "it was the first time that federal recognition came to the fore and the power of federal recognition, because the Monacans were able to use federal law to say, 'This will not happen. This is a sacred site, the ancestors are buried here, it was the chiefest [sic] of our towns, and it should not be disturbed'". Monacan Tribal Chief Kenneth Branham said in a statement regarding the overall controversy and the JRWA's decision, "[The JRWA] wasted a lot of money, a lot of time and a lot of energy, but thank God we’re here today and celebrating". According to Werkheiser, following the water authority's decision, the tribe would begin discussions with other landowners of the site regarding "tribal access, stewardship and eventual ownership", per a 2022 article in The Washington Post.

== Sources ==
- Arnold, Scott David (2007). A Guidebook to Virginia's Historical Markers. Published in association with the Virginia Department of Historic Resources (Third ed.). Charlottesville, Virginia: University of Virginia Press. ISBN 978-0-8139-2572-1.
- "Point of Fork Arsenal in 1781". The Bulletin of the Fluvanna County Historical Society (25). Fluvanna County Historical Society: 5–21. October 1977.
- Bushnell, David I. Jr. (November 18, 1930). "The Five Monacan Towns in Virginia, 1607". Smithsonian Miscellaneous Collections. 82 (12). Washington, D.C.: Smithsonian Institution: 1–38.
- McCary, Ben C. (1983) [1957]. Indians in Seventeenth-Century Virginia. Jamestown Booklet No. 3. Charlottesville, Virginia: University Press of Virginia.
- Salmon, John S. (1996) [1994]. A Guidebook to Virginia's Historical Markers. Prepared by the Virginia Department of Historic Resources (Revised and Expanded ed.). Charlottesville, Virginia: University Press of Virginia. ISBN 978-0-8139-1491-6.
