= Seay's Chapel Methodist Church =

Historic church in Virginia, United States

- U.S. National Register of Historic Places
- Virginia Landmarks Register
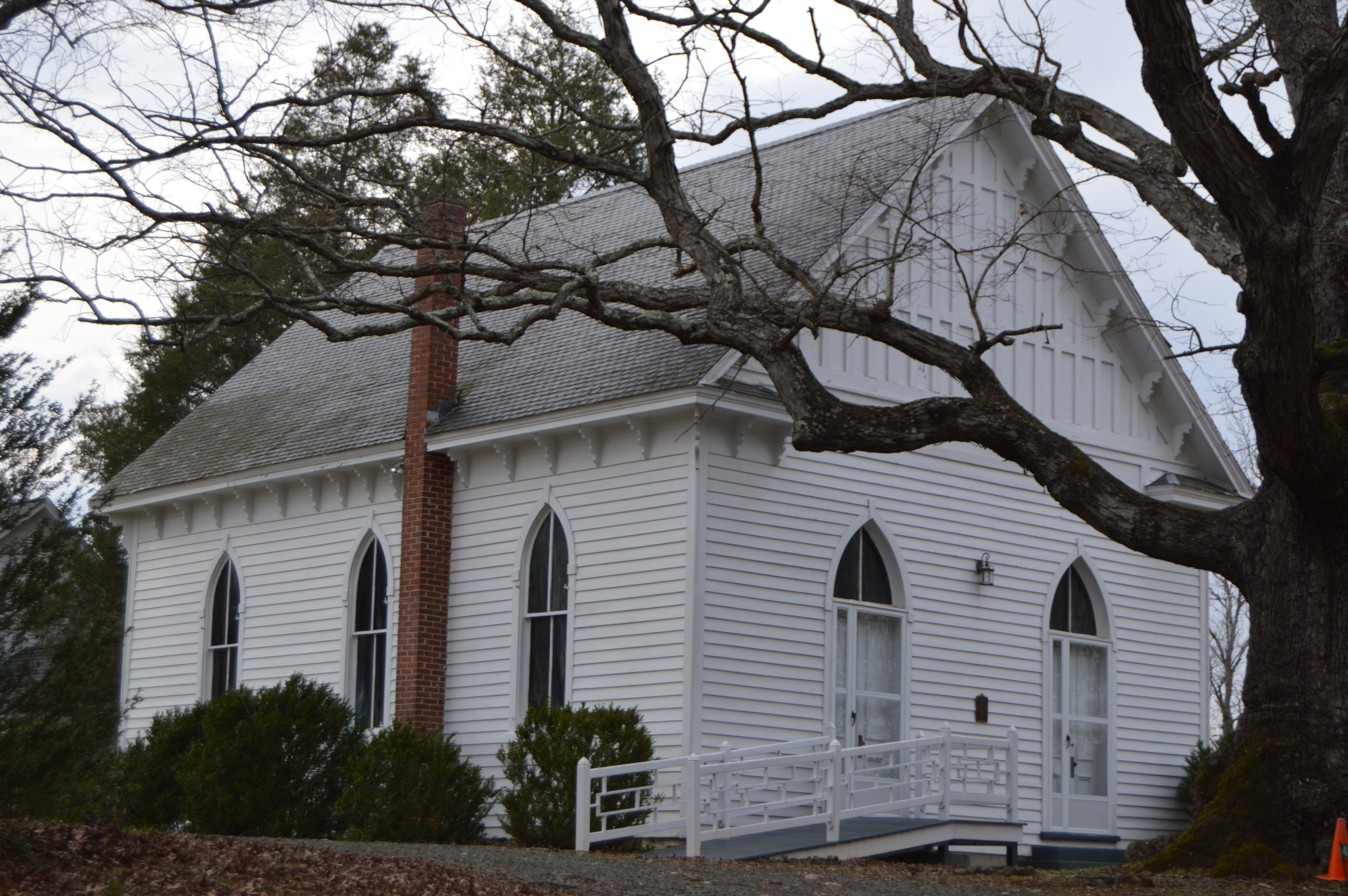
- Front and southern side

- Location within Virginia Location within the United States
- Location: 4916 Shores Rd., near Palmyra, Virginia
- Coordinates: 37°44′41″N 78°21′38″W
- Area: 1.964 acres (0.795 ha)
- Built: 1893–1902
- Built by: Anderson, James Henry
- Architectural style: Carpenter Gothic
- NRHP reference No.: 12000540
- VLR No.: 032-0188

Significant dates
- Added to NRHP: August 22, 2012
- Designated VLR: June 21, 2012

Seay's Chapel Methodist Church is a historic Methodist church located near Palmyra, Fluvanna County, Virginia. It was built between 1893 and 1902, and is a one-story, 30 feet by 40 feet, vernacular Carpenter Gothic style chapel. It features a slate gable roof with ornamental wooden brackets under the eaves and along the gables and a rectangular wooden panel design in the front and rear gables. Also on the property is the contributing church cemetery.

It was listed on the National Register of Historic Places in 2012.
