= Fluvanna County Courthouse Historic District =

Historic district in Virginia, United States

- U.S. National Register of Historic Places
- U.S. Historic district
- Virginia Landmarks Register
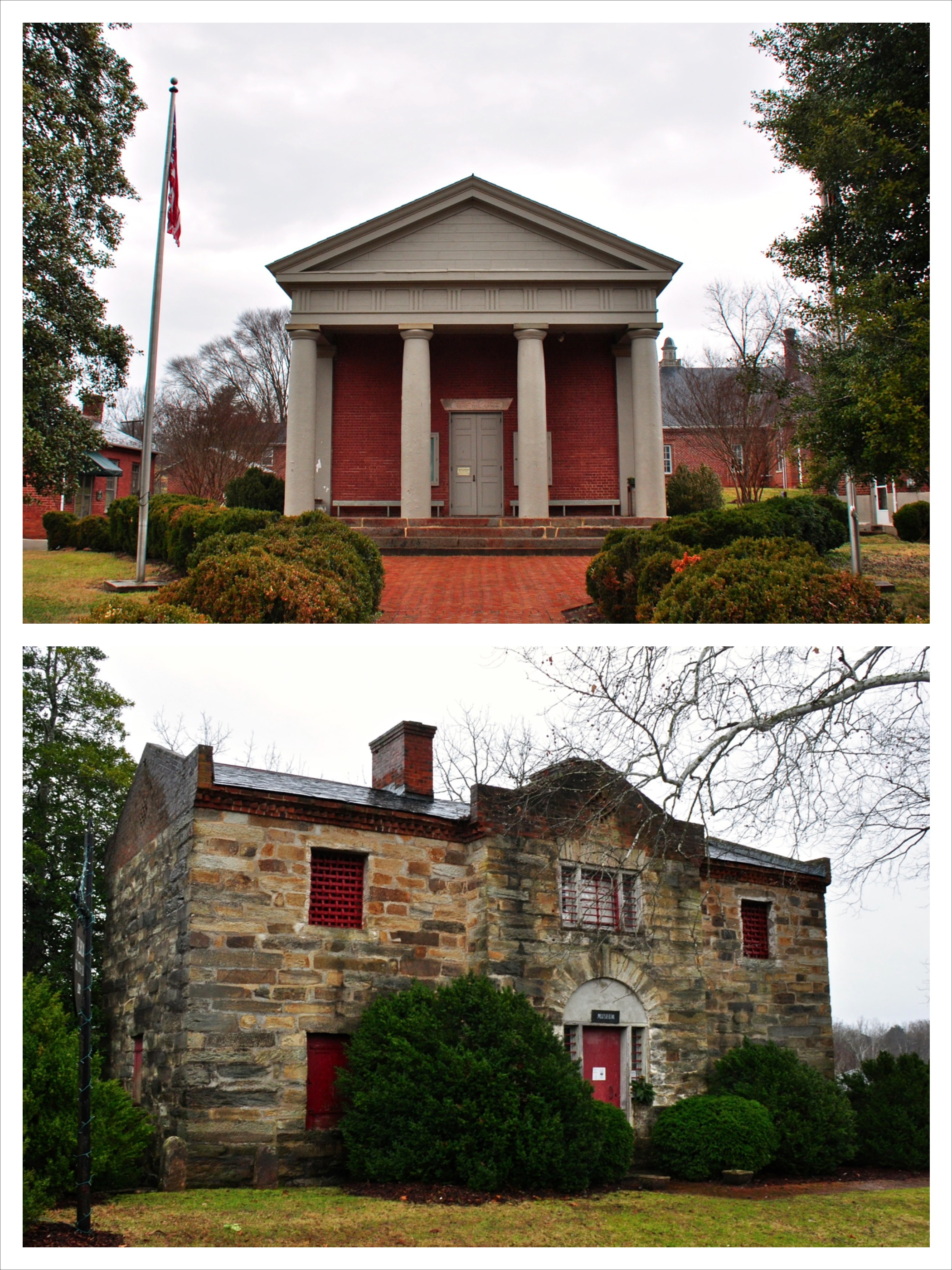
- Two of the contributing buildings, the county courthouse (top) and the stone jail (bottom) in January, 2014.

- Location within Virginia Location within the United States
- Location: Roughly bounded by VA 601, VA 15, and the Rivanna River, Palmyra, Virginia
- Coordinates: 37°47′58″N 78°29′34″W
- Area: 60 acres (24 ha)
- Built by: Hughes, John G.
- Architectural style: Tetrastyle Roman Doric Temple
- NRHP reference No.: 71000977
- VLR No.: 032-0040

Significant dates
- Added to NRHP: September 22, 1971
- Designated VLR: January 5, 1971

Fluvanna County Courthouse Historic District is a national historic district located at Palmyra, Fluvanna County, Virginia. The district encompasses four contributing buildings. The courthouse was built in 1830–1831, and is a two-story, brick building in the form of a tetrastyle Roman Doric temple. It is five bays deep. The other contributing buildings are a small lawyer's office (c. 1830) used as the Fluvanna County library and the stone jail house (1829), now the county museum.

It was added to the National Register of Historic Places in 1971.
