= Glen Burnie (Palmyra, Virginia) =

Historic house in Virginia, United States

- U.S. National Register of Historic Places
- Virginia Landmarks Register
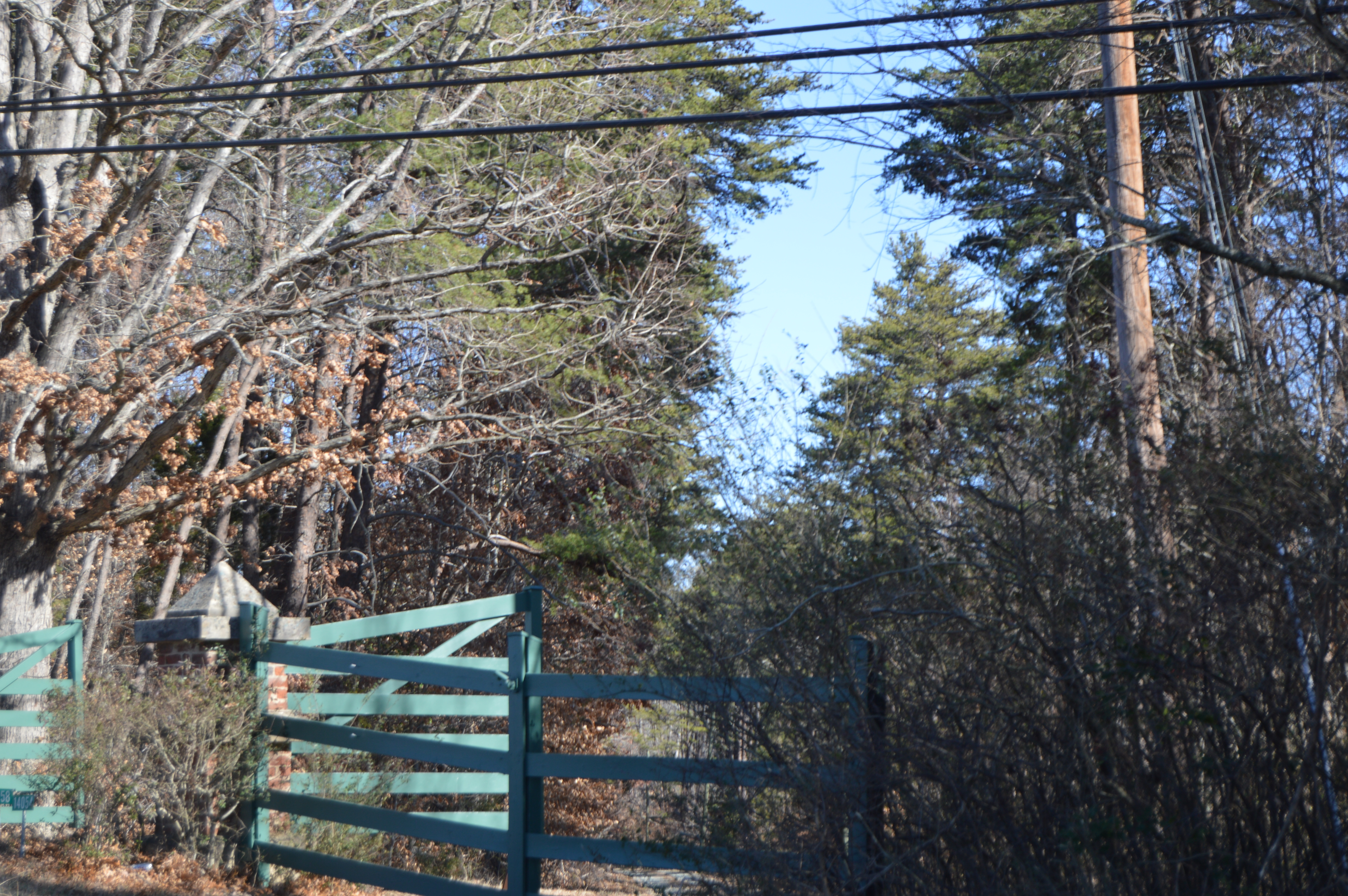
- Entrance to the property

- Location within Virginia Location within the United States
- Location: U.S. Route 15, 0.25 miles (0.40 km) north of Palmyra, Virginia
- Coordinates: 37°52′1″N 78°15′27″W
- Area: 150 acres (61 ha)
- Built: 1829
- Built by: John Hartwell Cocke
- NRHP reference No.: 00000893
- VLR No.: 032-0017

Significant dates
- Added to NRHP: August 2, 2000
- Designated VLR: June 14, 2000

Glen Burnie is a historic home located near Palmyra, Fluvanna County, Virginia. It was built in 1829, and is a two-story, three-bay, cruciform plan, gable-roofed brick structure with gable-end chimneys. The house was designed by General John Hartwell Cocke for Elizabeth Cary. The house has an eclectic mix of late Federal and Greek, Gothic, and Jacobean revival features. It has a mousetooth cornice, unusual pivoting windows, projecting towers and one-story porches on the south and north facade. Also on the property is the contributing Glen Burnie cemetery.

It was listed on the National Register of Historic Places in 2000.

The property at Glen Burnie currently houses a small Eastern Orthodox monastery, the home to two monks. One monk is an Iconographer and has a workshop and studio on the property at Glen Burnie.
