= Carysbrook, Virginia =

Unincorporated community in Virginia, United States

Carysbrook
- Unincorporated community
- Location in Virginia Carysbrook (the United States)
- Coordinates: 37°48′45″N 78°14′33″W
- Country: United States
- State: Virginia
- County: Fluvanna County
- Elevation: 315 ft (96 m)
- GNIS feature ID: 1492723

Carysbrook is an unincorporated community in Fluvanna County, in the U.S. state of Virginia.

== Geography ==
Location of Carysbrook within the Fluvanna County

Carysbrook is located approximately two miles northwest of Dixie and three miles southeast of Palmyra on U.S. Route 15 (James Madison Highway).

== Etymology ==
The name Carysbrook was taken from the colonial era plantation named for the Cary family. The Cary Plantation sprawled over thousands of acres along the banks of the Rivanna River, encompassing fertile bottomland where tobacco and other crops were grown. Wilson Miles Cary moved his family to his Fluvanna plantation, Carysbrook, in 1777 because the British were too close to his Williamsburg home. This newcomer, with ties of kinship to the Jefferson family, set himself up as a leader of the new county of Fluvanna. The Cary family's numerous slaves cultivated the land and tended to the rambling plantation home.

== Transportation ==
The Virginia Air Line Railway ran through Carysbrook. A small group of buildings and businesses associated with the railroad grew up around where the railroad crossed U.S. 15. A U.S. Post Office was established at Carysbrook. The train traveled from Strathmore Yard on the James River, to Cohasset, Carysbrook, Palmyra, Troy and on to Gordonsville or Charlottesville. There was a stone quarry near Carysbrook that quarried the granite for the railroad's bridges. The railroad bridge over the Rivanna River remains standing today to the north of Carysbrook, but is privately owned. The railroad was completed and began operating in October 1908. This branch route was built to handle cargo that would have otherwise been too tall or wide to fit through the tunnels that crossed the Blue Ridge Mountains between Charlottesville and Waynesboro. Coal destined for Washington, D.C. and Northern Virginia was sent down the James River Line to the southern junction of the route at Strathmore Yard, near Bremo Bluff. The shipments then proceeded up the Virginia Air Line to the northern junction at Lindsay, and continued on to Gordonsville.

The railway also became an important line of communication that connected the small communities along the route with larger cities, such as Washington, D.C. C&O began to operate the company directly in July 1909, and acquired it outright in July 1912. In 1927, dedicated passenger rail service was reduced to one train per day in each direction, and replaced by mixed (passenger and freight) trains in June 1932. Mixed trains stopped running in 1954. The growing adoption of automobiles, trucks and airplanes had been taking business away from railroads since the 1930s.

On October 26, 1971, the Fluvanna Board of Supervisors unsuccessfully sued the Chesapeake and Ohio Railway to keep the railway in operation; it was abandoned in November 1975. At one point there were a few small businesses surrounding the railroad tracks in Carysbrook to include a station, grocery store and post office. A few manufacturing plants opened in Carysbrook in the 1960s and 1970s but have since ceased operations.

== Education ==
The original Fluvanna County High School was built at Carysbrook and completed in 1934. The high school moved next to Fluvanna Junior High School (former Abrams High School) in 1976. Today the former F.C.H.S. campus and playing fields are used by the county parks & rec and other community organizations. Carysbrook Elementary School (formerly Fluvanna Middle School) is located on U.S. Route 15 across the old railroad tracks from the old F.C.H.S. football/baseball stadium.
