= Gum Creek (Osage River tributary) =

Stream in the U.S. state of Missouri

Gum Creek is a stream in Miller County in central Missouri. It is a tributary of the Osage River.

The stream headwaters are located at 38°15′30″N 92°30′47″W and the confluence with the Osage is at 38°13′05″N 92°28′18″W. The source area for the stream lies just south of Missouri Route 52 northwest of Tuscumbia. The stream flows southeast crossing under Missouri Route HH before joining the Osage southwest of Tuscumbia.

Gum Creek was so named on account of gum trees near its course.

== See also ==
- List of rivers of Missouri
