= Cohasset, Virginia =

Unincorporated community in Virginia, United States

Cohasset
- Unincorporated community
- Interactive map of Cohasset
- Coordinates: 37°46′11″N 78°18′11″W
- Country: United States
- State: Virginia
- County: Fluvanna
- Time zone: EST (UTC−05:00)
  - Summer (DST): EDT (UTC−04:00)
- GNIS feature ID: 1496849

Cohasset is an unincorporated community in Fluvanna County, Virginia, United States. It is located approximately 2 mi (3.2 km) west of Fork Union along Virginia State Route 6 (River Road).

It became a community because of the Virginia Air Line Railway, with the train station being known as the Fork Union Depot. The station served the community of Cohasset itself which grew up around the depot soon after it was built – a general store and post office, four houses, a very early gas station, all of which still stand. Mrs. Lettie Dickey, who with her husband sold the land for the station to the railroad, had named the community Cohasset for her hometown in Massachusetts.

The train traveled from Strathmore Yard on the James River to Cohasset, Carysbrook, Palmyra, Troy and to Gordonsville or Charlotttesville. The railroad was completed and began operating in October 1908. This branch route was built to handle cargo that would have otherwise been too tall or wide to fit through the tunnels that crossed the Blue Ridge Mountains between Charlottesville and Waynesboro. Coal destined for Washington, D.C., and Northern Virginia was sent down the James River Line to the southern junction of the route at Strathmore Yard, near Bremo Bluff. The shipments then proceeded up the Virginia Air Line to the northern junction at Lindsay, and continued on to Gordonsville. The Fork Union Depot served as a typical small railroad station of its day. Much of the local commercial business was associated with the nearby sawmill, canning factory, and two small oil storage companies. The passengers came from the surrounding farms, small towns, and the Fork Union Military Academy. The train was the main transportation for Cadets attending nearby Fork Union Military Academy for many years.

The railway also became an important line of communication that connected the small communities along the route with larger cities, such as Washington, D.C. C&O began to operate the company directly in July 1909, and acquired it outright in July 1912. In 1927, dedicated passenger rail service was reduced to one train per day in each direction, and replaced by mixed (passenger and freight) trains in June 1932. Mixed trains stopped running in 1954. The growing adoption of automobiles, trucks and airplanes had been taking business away from railroads since the 1930s.

On October 26, 1971, the Fluvanna Board of Supervisors unsuccessfully sued the Chesapeake and Ohio Railway to keep the railway in operation; it was abandoned in November 1975. There are a few remaining buildings in Cohasset that are associated with commerce during the railroad days.
