= Pleasant Grove (Palmyra, Virginia) =

Historic house in Virginia, United States

- U.S. National Register of Historic Places
- Virginia Landmarks Register
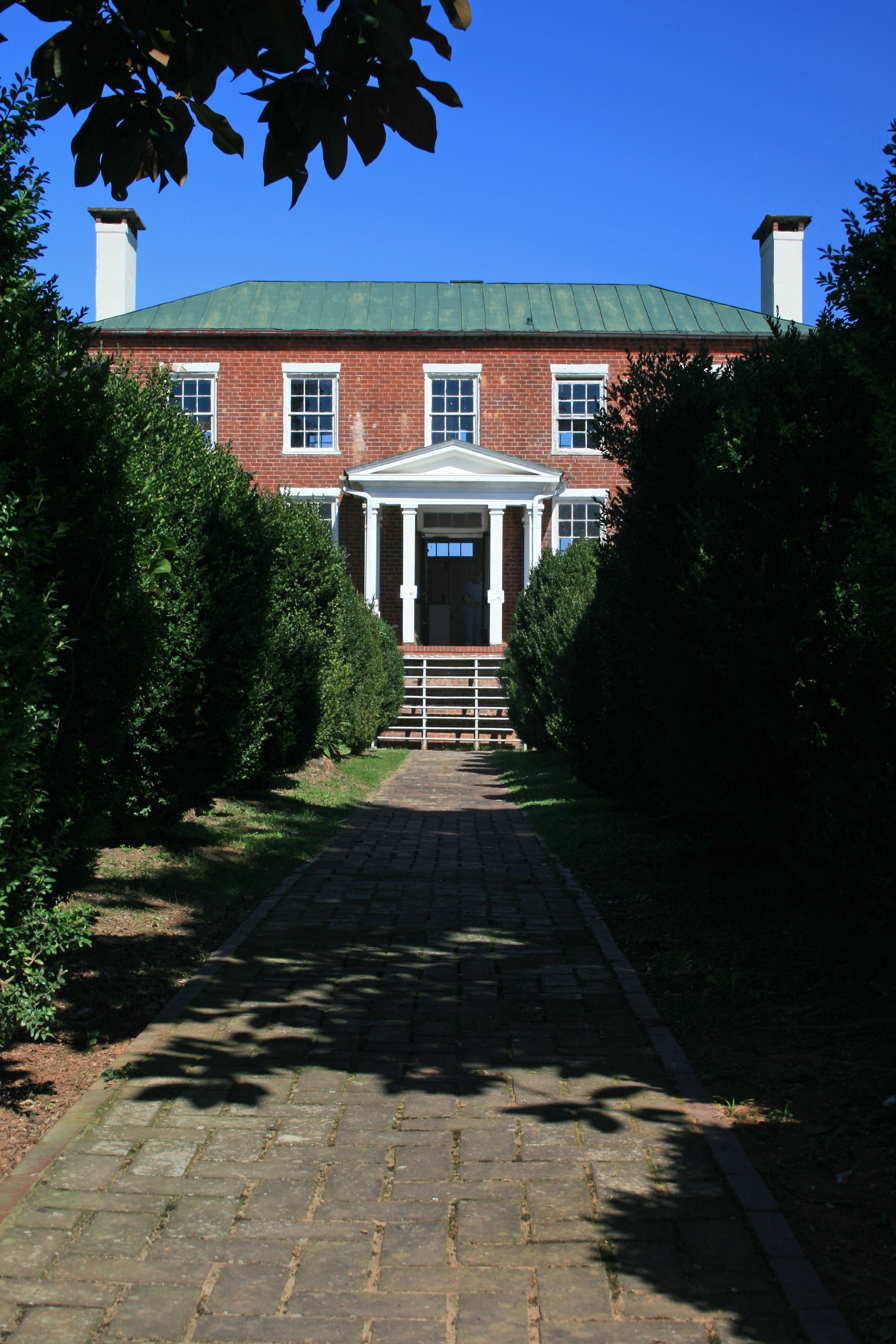
- Pleasant Grove in 2008

- Location within Virginia Location within the United States
- Location: Thomas Jefferson Pkwy, Virginia 53, near Palmyra, Virginia
- Coordinates: 37°52′27″N 78°17′32″W
- Area: 5 acres (2.0 ha)
- Built: 1854
- Architectural style: Mid 19th Century Revival
- NRHP reference No.: 04000843
- VLR No.: 032-0079

Significant dates
- Added to NRHP: August 12, 2004
- Designated VLR: June 16, 2004

Pleasant Grove, also known as Laura Ann Farm and Oakworld, is a historic home located near Palmyra, Fluvanna County, Virginia. It was built in 1854, and is a two-story, five-bay, brick dwelling with a low hipped roof. The house has a 1 1/2-story, shed roofed, frame lean-to addition. It features a four-bay pedimented front porch, a mousetooth cornice, architrave moldings, and a delicate stair with paneled spandrel. Also on the property are the contributing outdoor kitchen, smokehouse, and Haden family cemetery. Fluvanna County acquired the property in December 1994.

It was listed on the National Register of Historic Places in 2004.
