= Columbia, Virginia =

Unincorporated community in Virginia, United States

- Village
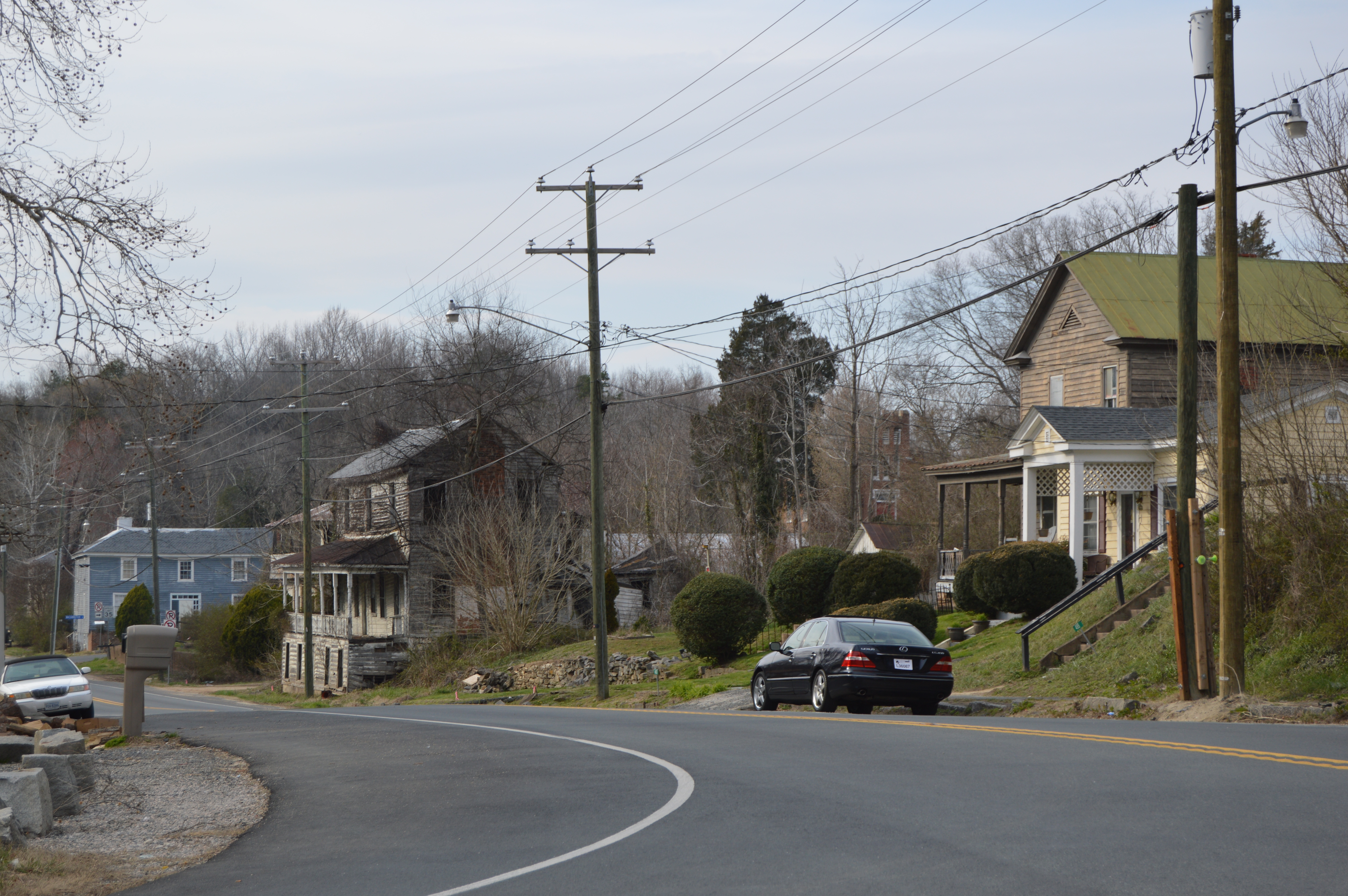
- St. James Street

- Karte Location of the Columbia CDP within the Fluvanna County

- Location within Virginia Location within the United States
- Coordinates: 37°45′8″N 78°9′44″W
- Country: United States
- State: Virginia
- County: Fluvanna
- Incorporated: 1788
- Disincorporated: 2016
- Named for: Columbia (poetic name for the United States)

Area
  - Total: 0.20 sq mi (0.53 km^{2})
  - Land: 0.19 sq mi (0.50 km^{2})
  - Water: 0.012 sq mi (0.03 km^{2})
- Elevation: 203 ft (62 m)

Population (2010)
  - Total: 83
  - Density: 428/sq mi (165.2/km^{2})
- Time zone: UTC−5 (Eastern (EST))
  - Summer (DST): UTC−4 (EDT)
- ZIP code: 23038
- FIPS code: 51-18624
- GNIS feature ID: 1492796

Columbia, formerly known as Point of Fork, is a village and census designated place in Fluvanna County, Virginia, United States, at the confluence of the James and Rivanna rivers. Following a referendum, Columbia was dissolved as an incorporated town – until that time, it was the smallest in Virginia – on July 1, 2016. As of the 2010 census, the town's population was 83, up from 49 at the 2000 census.

Columbia is part of the Charlottesville Metropolitan Statistical Area. It is on the border between Fluvanna County and Goochland County, and across the river from Cumberland County.

== History ==
In pre-colonial times, the site served as the location of Rassawek or Rassewek, the capital of what is now known as the Monacan Indian Nation. As of 2020, the historic remains of the Monacan settlement were under threat from a proposed water pumping station for the Cobb Creek Reservoir. The National Trust for Historic Preservation named it as one of America's most endangered historic places.

English settlers who took over the land established a community called Point of Fork, in reference to the confluence of James and Rivanna rivers. During the Revolutionary War, a Patriot arsenal under the command of Friedrich Wilhelm von Steuben stood near Point of Fork. A detachment of the Queen's Rangers, composed of American Loyalists and commanded by Colonel John Graves Simcoe, were sent by Major General Charles Cornwallis to capture and confiscate the arsenal. Upon learning of Simcoe's approach, von Steuben ordered his troops to transport the arsenal's stores across the James; heavy artillery was dumped into the river to be recovered later. Simcoe captured the arsenal on June 5, 1781, and reported seizing a vast amount of Patriot supplies. However, von Steuben and General Lafayette reported that losses were negligible.

The arsenal was rebuilt and supplied material to combat the Whiskey Rebellion and to aid the Battle of Fallen Timbers. It remained in service until 1801, when it was abandoned in favor of a more centralized arsenal, the Virginia Manufactory of Arms, located in Richmond.

Following the end of the war and the founding of the United States, the community changed its name to "Columbia" and became incorporated as a town in 1788. Columbia became a shipping point on the James River for Virginia's tobacco trade, establishing its own bateau freight line. The confluence of the rivers at Columbia linked Richmond to Lynchburg through the James River and to Charlottesville through the Rivanna. In the mid-19th century, Columbia served as a point along the stagecoach route between Richmond and Staunton.

The town entered an economic decline with the end of passenger railroad service in 1958, and saw many homes and businesses destroyed in floods caused by Hurricanes Camille in 1969 and Agnes in 1972. In the decades afterward, conditions in the town worsened as buildings along its main street either burned down or became abandoned. In May 2014, Columbia's mayor, John Hammond, and town council proposed disincorporation, which would result in the town being governed solely by Fluvanna County in exchange for financial aid. Despite efforts by historic preservationists to raise money for the town's continued existence as an independent entity, residents voted to disincorporate in a referendum held on March 17, 2015. The Virginia General Assembly revoked Columbia's town charter on March 3, 2016, via HB14 during the 2016 session. The disincorporation took effect on July 1, 2016.

=== Shrine of St. Katharine Drexel ===
Columbia is home to St. Joseph's Church and Shrine of St. Katharine Drexel, a parish within the Roman Catholic Diocese of Richmond. The church was built by William and Catherine Wakeham, English Catholic abolitionists who moved to Columbia in 1833. Because they were abolitionists, the hill on which their house was built came to be called Free Hill. After Catherine Wakeham's death in 1891, her sons Alfred and Richard, both Josephites, were called away from Columbia for clerical duties. An elderly African-American man, Zack Kimbro, continued to maintain the chapel and place fresh flowers and clean linen on its altar.

St. Katharine Drexel, S.B.S. (1858–1955), the founder of the Sisters of the Blessed Sacrament, visited the church while passing through Columbia in 1901 and noticed the reflection of sunlight on the chapel's cross. St. Katherine was eventually introduced to Kimbro, who told her he had prayed daily for over a decade that Mass would once more be celebrated in the chapel. St. Katharine contacted the Josephite Fathers and arranged for Mass to be celebrated in the church's chapel regularly. She also founded a small school adjacent to the chapel, which became a renowned educational institution available for black children in Fluvanna County. Miss Lydia O’Hare Nicholas taught at the school for 47 years until it closed and she retired. St. Joseph's and its school became the center of one of Virginia's only historically African-American Catholic communities.

Because of its location on high ground, St. Joseph's was spared during the 20th Century floods that mostly destroyed Columbia's other buildings. The church is still an active parish, sharing a pastor with Saints Peter and Paul Catholic Church in Palmyra. St. Joseph's also serves Catholic students at the nearby Fork Union Military Academy.

== Geography ==
Columbia is located in the southeastern corner of Fluvanna County at 37°45′8″N 78°9′44″W (37.752206, −78.162291), on the north side of the James River. Virginia State Route 6 passes through the town, leading northwest 4.5 miles (7.2 km) to U.S. Route 15 at Dixie and east 16 miles (26 km) to Goochland. Charlottesville is 31 miles (50 km) to the northwest, and Richmond is 47 miles (76 km) to the east. According to the United States Census Bureau, the former town limits encompassed a total area of 0.19 square miles (0.5 km^{2}), of which 0.01 square miles (0.02 km^{2}), or 4.90%, is water.

=== Climate ===
The climate is characterized by relatively high temperatures and evenly distributed precipitation throughout the year. The Köppen Climate Classification subtype for this climate is "Cfa" (Humid Subtropical Climate).

Climate data for Columbia, Virginia
Month	Jan	Feb	Mar	Apr	May	Jun	Jul	Aug	Sep	Oct	Nov	Dec	Year
Mean daily maximum °C (°F)	8 (46)	9 (48)	14 (57)	20 (68)	25 (77)	29 (84)	31 (87)	30 (86)	27 (80)	21 (69)	15 (59)	9 (48)	19 (66)
Mean daily minimum °C (°F)	−4 (24)	−3 (26)	0 (32)	5 (41)	10 (50)	15 (59)	18 (64)	17 (62)	13 (55)	6 (42)	1 (33)	−3 (26)	6 (42)
Average precipitation mm (inches)	81 (3.2)	71 (2.8)	91 (3.6)	84 (3.3)	94 (3.7)	91 (3.6)	110 (4.3)	110 (4.2)	84 (3.3)	84 (3.3)	71 (2.8)	79 (3.1)	1,050 (41.2)
Source: Weatherbase

== Demographics ==
Historical population
Census	Pop.	Note	%±
1860	263		—
1870	311		18.3%
1880	239		−23.2%
1890	239		0.0%
1900	216		−9.6%
1910	157		−27.3%
1920	185		17.8%
1930	154		−16.8%
1940	144		−6.5%
1950	119		−17.4%
1960	86		−27.7%
1970	125		45.3%
1980	111		−11.2%
1990	58		−47.7%
2000	49		−15.5%
2010	83		69.4%
U.S. Decennial Census; 1950 1960 1970; 1980 1990 2000; 2010

=== 2000 census ===
As of the census of 2000, there were 49 people, 18 households, and 12 families residing in the town. The population density was 246.1 people per square mile (94.6/km^{2}). There were 22 housing units at an average density of 110.5 per square mile (42.5/km^{2}). The racial makeup of the town was 63.27% White, 28.57% African American, and 8.16% from two or more races. Hispanic or Latino of any race were 4.08% of the population.

There were 18 households, out of which 27.8% had children under the age of 18 living with them, 66.7% were married couples living together, 5.6% had a female householder with no husband present, and 27.8% were non-families. 16.7% of all households were made up of individuals, and 11.1% had someone living alone who was 65 years of age or older. The average household size was 2.72 and the average family size was 3.23.

In the town the population was spread out, with 22.4% under the age of 18, 6.1% from 18 to 24, 20.4% from 25 to 44, 44.9% from 45 to 64, and 6.1% who were 65 years of age or older. The median age was 48 years. For every 100 females, there were 69.0 males. For every 100 females age 18 and over, there were 72.7 males.

The median income for a household in the town was $46,250, and the median income for a family was $50,000. Males had a median income of $18,750 versus $18,125 for females. The per capita income for the town was $13,632. None of the population or families were below the poverty line.

=== 2010 census ===
At the 2010 census, approximately 55.6% of the population aged 16 and older were employed. The median household income was $90,000, and the median family income was $43,750. The per capita income for the town was $14,956. 45.5% of all families were below the poverty line. while 100% of the families headed by a female with no husband present were below the poverty line.
