= Palmyra, Virginia =

- Census-designated place
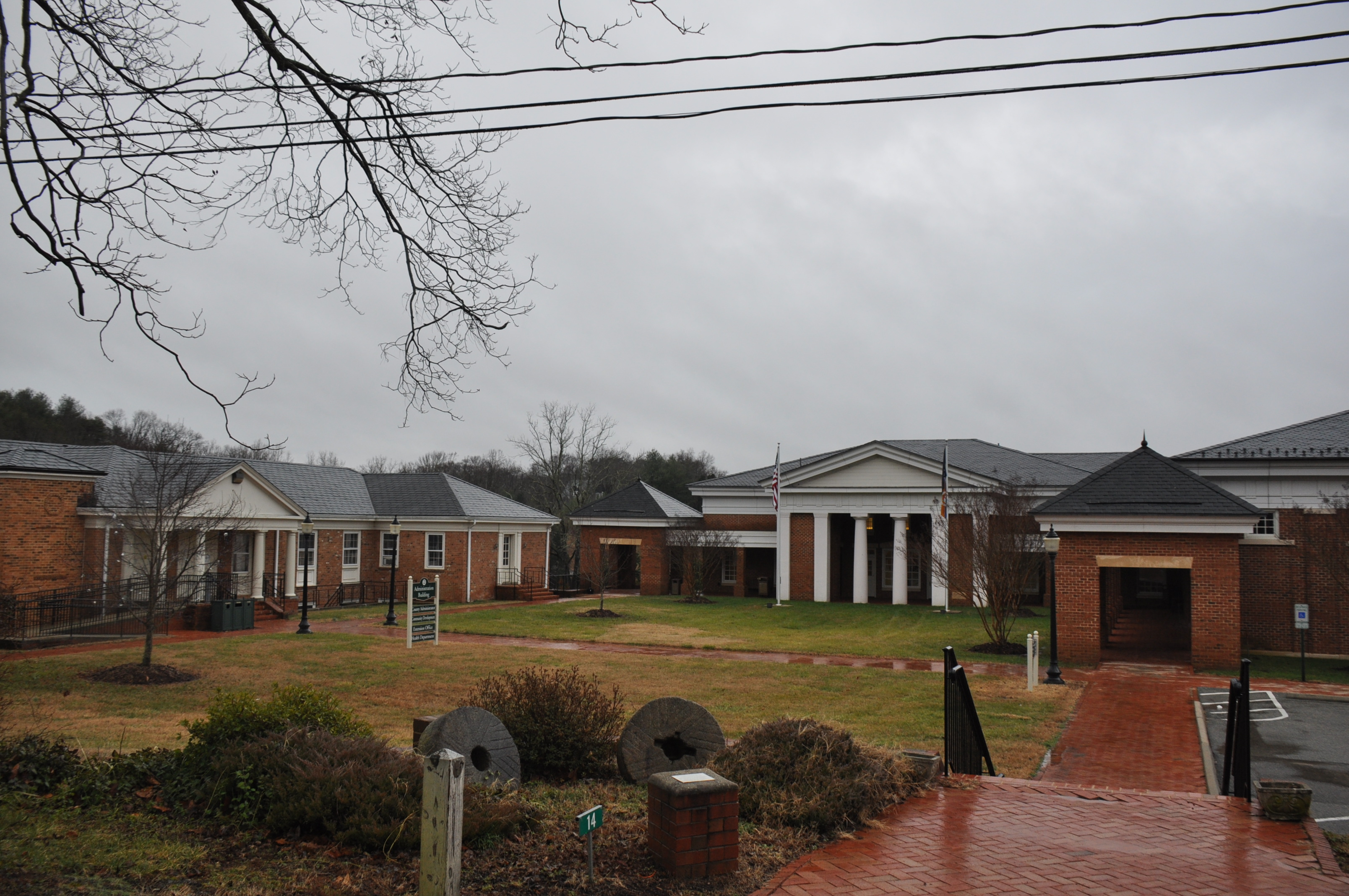
- Fluvanna County administrative and legal buildings in Palmyra

- Karte Location of Palmyra CDP within Fluvanna County

- Location within Virginia
- Coordinates: 37°51′40″N 78°15′48″W
- Country: United States
- State: Virginia
- County: Fluvanna

Area
  - Total: 1.42 sq mi (3.69 km^{2})
  - Land: 1.42 sq mi (3.67 km^{2})
  - Water: 0.012 sq mi (0.03 km^{2})
- Elevation: 299 ft (91 m)

Population (2020)
  - Total: 127
  - Density: 74/sq mi (28.4/km^{2})
- Time zone: UTC−5 (Eastern (EST))
  - Summer (DST): UTC−4 (EDT)
- ZIP code: 22963
- FIPS code: 51-60392
- GNIS feature ID: 1498526

Palmyra is a census-designated place (CDP) in and the county seat of Fluvanna County, Virginia, United States. As of the 2020 census, Palmyra had a population of 127. Palmyra lies on the eastern bank of the Rivanna River along U.S. Route 15. The ZIP code for Palmyra and surrounding rural land is 22963.

The Fluvanna County Courthouse Historic District, Glen Burnie, Pleasant Grove, and Seay's Chapel Methodist Church are listed on the National Register of Historic Places.

== History ==
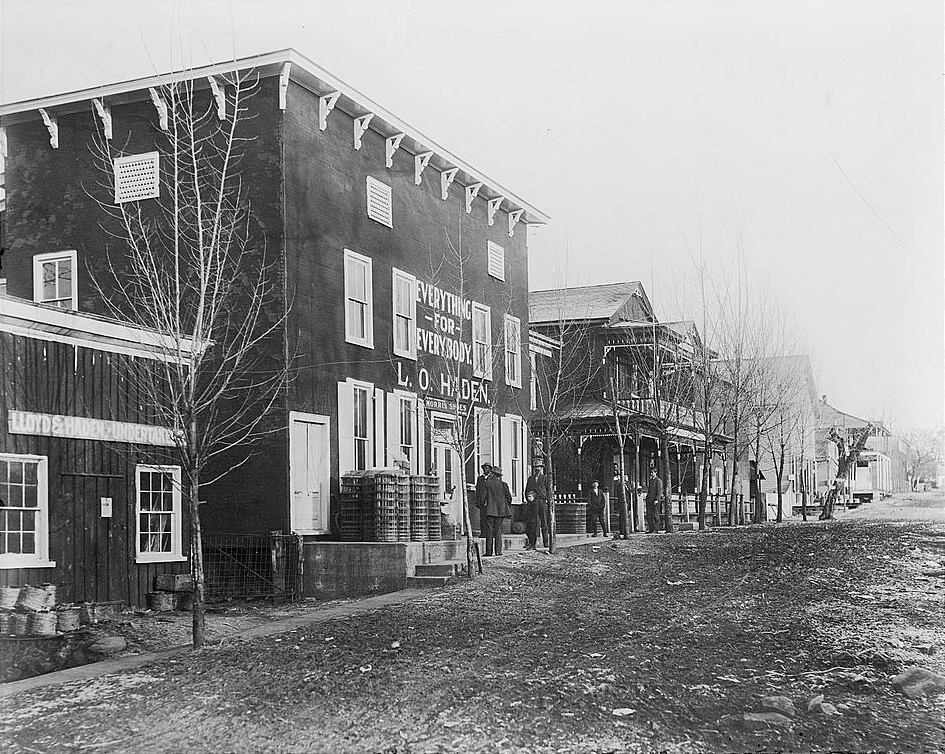
1912 street scene, showing L.O. Haden's general store

Before being named "Palmyra", the area was owned by the Timberlake family, and Reverend Walker Timberlake started a business there in 1814 called "Palmyra Mills".

The village of Palmyra was founded and became the county seat of Fluvanna County in 1828, and its historic courthouse was built in 1830–1831. By 1835, there were fourteen homes, a church, three factories, and various other businesses, though only two families owned all the land other than the public buildings. In the mid-19th century, it was a stop along the stagecoach route between Richmond and Staunton. The Virginia Air Line Railway, which operated from 1908 to 1975, ran through Palmyra. The train traveled from Strathmore on the James River, to Cohasset, to Carysbrook, to Palmyra, to Troy, and on to Gordonsville or Charlottesville.

A fire in 1930 destroyed many of the buildings on Main Street. As a result of the Great Depression, a smaller version of Palmyra was rebuilt after the fire.

== Geography ==
Palmyra is in central Fluvanna County, on a hillside rising to the northeast above the Rivanna River. U.S. Route 15 passes through the community, crossing the Rivanna at the south end of town. US 15 leads north 20 miles (32 km) to Gordonsville and south 51 miles (82 km) to Farmville. Virginia State Route 53 intersects US 15 just south of the Rivanna River and leads northwest 20 miles (32 km) to Charlottesville.

According to the U.S. Census Bureau, the Palmyra CDP has a total area of 1.4 square miles (3.7 km^{2}), of which 0.01 square miles (0.03 km^{2}), or 0.70%, is water.

== Demographics ==
Historical population
Census	Pop.	Note	%±
2010	104		—
2020	127		22.1%
U.S. Decennial Census; 2010 2020

Palmyra was first listed as a census designated place in the 2010 U.S. census.

== Climate ==
Palmyra's climate is characterized by a notable change in seasons and evenly distributed precipitation throughout the year. The Köppen Climate Classification subtype for this climate is "Cfa"(Humid Subtropical Climate).

Climate data for Palmyra, Virginia
Month	Jan	Feb	Mar	Apr	May	Jun	Jul	Aug	Sep	Oct	Nov	Dec	Year
Mean daily maximum °F (°C)	47 (8)	49 (9)	58 (14)	69 (21)	75 (24)	83 (28)	86 (30)	86 (30)	79 (26)	69 (21)	59 (15)	49 (9)	67 (19)
Mean daily minimum °F (°C)	25 (−4)	26 (−3)	32 (0)	41 (5)	50 (10)	60 (16)	64 (18)	63 (17)	56 (13)	43 (6)	34 (1)	27 (−3)	43 (6)
Average precipitation inches (mm)	2.9 (74)	2.8 (71)	3.6 (91)	2.9 (74)	3.7 (94)	3.5 (89)	4.1 (100)	4 (100)	3.4 (86)	3.7 (94)	3.1 (79)	3 (76)	40.7 (1,030)
Source: Weatherbase

== Notable residents ==
- Chris Adler, from the band Lamb of God
- Willie Adler, from the band Lamb of God
- Chris Daughtry, musician (American Idol, Daughtry), graduated from Fluvanna County High School in 1998. His parents still live in the area.
- Texas Jack Omohundro (1846-1880), frontier scout, actor, and cowboy born on the Pleasure Hill farm in Palmyra
