= Fluvanna County, Virginia =

County in Virginia, United States

- County
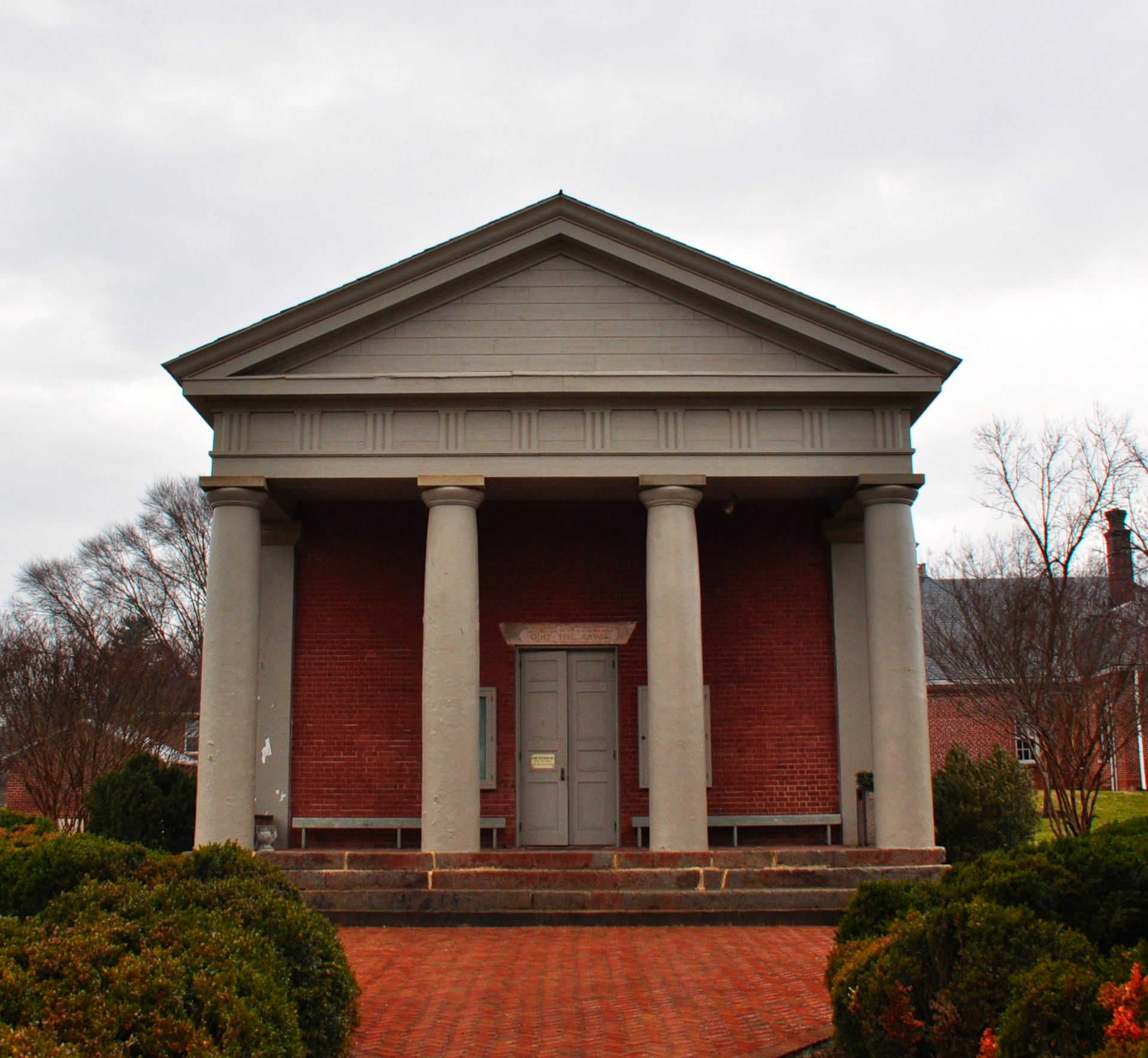
- Fluvanna County Courthouse in Palmyra, January 2014

- Flag Seal Logo

- Location within the U.S. state of Virginia
- Coordinates: 37°50′N 78°17′W
- Country: United States
- State: Virginia
- Founded: 1777
- Named for: Fluvanna River
- Seat: Palmyra
- Largest community: Lake Monticello

Area
  - Total: 290 sq mi (750 km^{2})
  - Land: 286 sq mi (740 km^{2})
  - Water: 4.1 sq mi (11 km^{2}) 1.4%

Population (2020)
  - Total: 27,249
  - Estimate (2025): 28,975 ▲
  - Density: 95.3/sq mi (36.8/km^{2})
- Time zone: UTC−5 (Eastern)
  - Summer (DST): UTC−4 (EDT)
- Congressional district: 5th
- Website: www.fluvannacounty.org

Fluvanna County is a United States county centrally located in the Piedmont region of the Commonwealth of Virginia. Part of the Charlottesville metropolitan area, Fluvanna's population, as of the 2020 census, was 27,249. The county seat is Palmyra, while the most populous community is the census designated place of Lake Monticello.

The county was formed in 1777 from part of Albemarle County after Fluvanna residents complained about having to cross the Southwest Mountains to reach the new Albemarle county seat. The new county was named for the Fluvanna River, which is now part of the James River, which in turn was named for Anne of Denmark.

== History ==
Through the 17th century, the Point of Fork (near Columbia where the James and Rivanna rivers meet) was the site of Rassawek, a major Monacan village of the Native Americans. By 1701, the Seneca Iroquois had overrun the entire Virginia Piedmont, which they sold to Virginia Colony in 1721 at the Treaty of Albany.

The area which is now Fluvanna County was once considered part of Henrico County, one of the original shires of the Virginia Colony. Henrico was divided in 1727 and the Fluvanna County area became a part of Goochland County. In 1744 Goochland was divided and the area currently known as Fluvanna became a part of Albemarle County. When Amherst County, Nelson County and Buckingham County were split off from Albemarle County, the Albemarle County Seat was moved in 1762 from Scottsville to Charlottesville. When the Albemarle County seat was moved citizens in the Fluvanna area would now have to trek over the Southwest Mountains to reach the new seat at Charlottesville. Fluvanna area citizens lobbied the Virginia General Assembly to create a new county. Finally, in 1777, Albemarle County was divided again, and Fluvanna County established. Located in the Piedmont above the Fall Line, the county has the Rivanna river running through it and has jurisdiction over the James, which defines its boundary with Buckingham County. It was sometimes referred to as "Old Flu."

The county was named for the Fluvanna River, which was so named by Captain John Smith during his explorations of the tributaries of the Chesapeake Bay 1607-1609. He renamed the Powhatan River after James I of England as far upstream as the Monacan village of Rassawek, where the river forks. He named the rivers converging there (to form the James): the Rivanna River and the Fluvanna River, after King James's Queen Consort, Anne of Denmark. (This was long before the reign of Queen Anne of England, 1702 - 1714.) Today what was the Fluvanna River is considered an upper segment of the James River. Today, the site of Rassawek, where the Rivanna River flows into the James, is called The Point of Fork, just as it was when the Virginia arsenal was there, during and after the American Revolution.

Fluvanna was defended by six militia companies during the American Revolutionary War. The county was invaded by British forces in 1781 who destroyed the Point of Fork Arsenal. From an initial 882 "tithables," the population reached 3,300 by 1782. Columbia was formed in 1788 with Bernardsburg and Wilmington following soon after. Lyles Baptist Church was organized in 1774 and the formation of the Methodist denomination had its roots in a Conference held in Fluvanna in 1779. The "Brick Union" Church was built in 1825 for the use of Episcopalians, Methodists, Baptists and Presbyterians. The village of Fork Union grew up around the Church.

When Palmyra was made the county seat in 1828 it quickly became a thriving town after the new courthouse was completed in 1830.

In the late eighteenth century, Thomas Jefferson improved the navigability of the Rivanna River, as he owned much property along its upper course, e.g. Shadwell and Monticello plantations. Improvements included in the first generation (through 1830) were sluice cuts, small dams and batteaux locks.

Second-generation (1840–1870) improvements made by others included construction of long stretches of canal, serviced by large locks, many of which are still visible along the river. Shortly after the completion of the initial Rivanna navigational works, Virginia requested that the river be opened to public usage. Jefferson reportedly initially refused, but the state insisted and the Rivanna became an integral part of the central Virginian transportation network. The route serviced a large community of farmsteads, plantations throughout Albemarle and Fluvanna counties. It also was lined by increasing numbers of industrial facilities, such as those at Union Mills. Construction of the larger mills prompted the great improvements to navigation. For instance, Union Mills featured a two-and-a-half-mile long canal and towpath, and one upper and two massive lower locks, all directly upon the river.

Where the Rivanna meets the James River at Columbia, the Rivanna Connexion Canal merged with a much longer canal. (The series of locks which connected the two canals lie just outside the Town of Columbia and are mostly buried by sediment today). In 1840, the James River and Kanawha Canal was constructed adjacent to the north bank of the James River and opened to traffic. The new canal was part of a planned link between the Chesapeake Bay and the Atlantic Ocean via the James and the Kanawha rivers; it was intended to connect via the Ohio River, to the Mississippi River and the Gulf of Mexico. The canal was used by packet and freight boats, which replaced the earlier shallow-draft batteau for commerce. These boats brought goods and passengers to and from Richmond and points beyond. Long a dream of early Virginians such as George Washington, who was a surveyor early in his career, the canal was never completed as envisioned.

In the batteaux era, Milton was the head of navigation on the river. By the early nineteenth century, horse-drawn canal boats were traveling all the way upstream to Charlottesville. The head of navigation was located at the point where the Fredericksburg Road (now VA 20) and Three Chopt Road (U.S. Route 250), the primary road to Richmond, met and entered the city at the Free Bridge, establishing the city as a major commercial hub.

While no Civil War battles were fought in Fluvanna, Union soldiers burned mills and bridges and damaged the James River and Kanawha Canal to disrupt traffic and commerce. On March 10, 1865, Union forces skirmished with local home guard at Palmyra, resulting in the death of one Fluvanna man. Other minor skirmishing also took place near Columbia. During the American Civil War more than 1,200 of the county's citizens served in the Confederate forces. Its citizens served in infantry, cavalry, and artillery units during the war, including the Fluvanna Artillery. Two companies, the Fluvanna Hornets and the Fluvanna Rifle Grays, formed as Companies F and K of the 44th Virginia Infantry. Another company, the Fluvanna Rifle Guard, formed as Company C of the 14th Virginia Infantry. Other Fluvanna men served in the 19th Virginia Infantry, 22nd Virginia Infantry Battalion, 46th Virginia Infantry, 57th Virginia Infantry, the 5th Virginia Cavalry, and the 1st Virginia Reserves Battalion, and several other regiments and battalions.

The canal was repaired after the war, but traffic never returned to pre-war levels, as railroads were being constructed throughout the state and were more efficient. After many years of trying to compete with the ever-expanding railroad network, the James River and Kanawha Canal was conveyed to a new railroad company by a deed dated March 4, 1880. Railroad construction workers promptly started laying tracks on the towpath. The new Richmond and Allegheny Railroad offered a water-level route from the Appalachian Mountains just east of West Virginia near Jackson's River Station (now Clifton Forge) through the Blue Ridge Mountains at Balcony Falls to Richmond. In 1888 the railroad was leased, and later purchased, by Collis P. Huntington's Chesapeake and Ohio Railway.

Fork Union Military Academy (FUMA) was initially founded as Fork Union Academy in October 1898 by Dr. William E. Hatcher, a prominent local Baptist minister. The first class had 19 boys and girls. In 1902, the academy took on a military structure to provide organization, discipline, and physical development for the boys of what was a rapidly growing school. In 1913, the academy became an all-male institution and changed its name to Fork Union Military Academy. That same year, the academy began receiving support from the Baptist General Association of Virginia, which has continued into the 21st century. FUMA is known for its One Subject Plan as well as Post Graduate Football team that has many NFL players and Heisman Trophy winners as alumni.

Early in the 20th century, the C&O built a new line between the James River Line at Strathmore and the Piedmont Subdivision on the old Virginia Central Railroad's line at Gordonsville. The Virginia Air Line Railway was built to move loads that were too high or too wide to pass through the tunnels of the Blue Ridge Mountain complex between Charlottesville and Waynesboro. Additionally, coal trains from West Virginia headed eastbound for Washington, D.C., and Northern Virginia were routed on the new line to avoid steep mountain grades. The VAL was completed on September 29, 1909. A new freight station was built at Palmyra. The tracks of the VAL were abandoned in 1975, as railroad freight traffic had declined.

== Demographics ==
Historical population
Census	Pop.	Note	%±
1790	3,921		—
1800	4,623		17.9%
1810	4,775		3.3%
1820	6,704		40.4%
1830	8,221		22.6%
1840	8,812		7.2%
1850	9,487		7.7%
1860	10,353		9.1%
1870	9,875		−4.6%
1880	10,802		9.4%
1890	9,508		−12.0%
1900	9,050		−4.8%
1910	8,323		−8.0%
1920	8,547		2.7%
1930	7,466		−12.6%
1940	7,088		−5.1%
1950	7,121		0.5%
1960	7,227		1.5%
1970	7,621		5.5%
1980	10,244		34.4%
1990	12,429		21.3%
2000	20,047		61.3%
2010	25,691		28.2%
2020	27,249		6.1%
2025 (est.)	28,975	▲	6.3%
U.S. Decennial Census; 1790–1960 1900–1990; 1990–2000 2010 2020

=== Racial and ethnic composition ===
Fluvanna County, Virginia – Racial and ethnic composition Note: the US Census treats Hispanic/Latino as an ethnic category. This table excludes Latinos from the racial categories and assigns them to a separate category. Hispanics/Latinos may be of any race.
Race / Ethnicity (NH = Non-Hispanic)	Pop 1980	Pop 1990	Pop 2000	Pop 2010	Pop 2020	% 1980	% 1990	% 2000	% 2010	% 2020
White alone (NH)	7,184	9,475	15,794	20,318	20,760	70.13%	76.23%	78.78%	79.09%	76.19%
Black or African American alone (NH)	2,987	2,841	3,664	3,913	3,669	29.16%	22.86%	18.28%	15.23%	13.46%
Native American or Alaska Native alone (NH)	12	21	35	44	68	0.12%	0.17%	0.17%	0.17%	0.25%
Asian alone (NH)	7	18	75	136	212	0.07%	0.14%	0.37%	0.53%	0.78%
Native Hawaiian or Pacific Islander alone (NH)	x	x	8	10	7	x	x	0.04%	0.04%	0.03%
Other race alone (NH)	2	5	25	32	155	0.02%	0.04%	0.12%	0.12%	0.57%
Mixed race or Multiracial (NH)	x	x	211	478	1,271	x	x	1.05%	1.86%	4.66%
Hispanic or Latino (any race)	52	69	235	760	1,107	0.51%	0.56%	1.17%	2.96%	4.06%
Total	10,244	12,429	20,047	25,691	27,249	100.00%	100.00%	100.00%	100.00%	100.00%

=== 2020 census ===
As of the 2020 census, the county had a population of 27,249. The median age was 44.5 years. 19.9% of residents were under the age of 18 and 21.2% of residents were 65 years of age or older. For every 100 females there were 85.8 males, and for every 100 females age 18 and over there were 82.0 males age 18 and over.

The racial makeup of the county was 77.2% White, 13.7% Black or African American, 0.3% American Indian and Alaska Native, 0.8% Asian, 0.0% Native Hawaiian and Pacific Islander, 1.6% from some other race, and 6.4% from two or more races. Hispanic or Latino residents of any race comprised 4.1% of the population.

36.1% of residents lived in urban areas, while 63.9% lived in rural areas.

There were 10,280 households in the county, of which 28.8% had children under the age of 18 living with them and 23.8% had a female householder with no spouse or partner present. About 22.4% of all households were made up of individuals and 11.3% had someone living alone who was 65 years of age or older.

There were 11,127 housing units, of which 7.6% were vacant. Among occupied housing units, 85.2% were owner-occupied and 14.8% were renter-occupied. The homeowner vacancy rate was 1.5% and the rental vacancy rate was 4.5%.

=== 2000 Census ===
As of the census of 2000, there were 20,047 people, 7,387 households, and 5,702 families residing in the county. The population density was 70 people per square mile (27 people/km^{2}). There were 8,018 housing units at an average density of 28 units per square mile (11 units/km^{2}). The racial makeup of the county was 79.44% White, 18.41% Black or African American, 0.19% Native American, 0.38% Asian, 0.01% Pacific Islander, 0.29% from other races, and 1.25% from two or more races. 1.17% of the population were Hispanic or Latino of any race.

In the county, the population was spread out, with 23.60% under the age of 18, 6.40% from 18 to 24, 31.70% from 25 to 44, 24.40% from 45 to 64, and 14.00% who were 65 years of age or older. The median age was 38 years. For every 100 females there were 86.60 males. For every 100 females aged 18 and over, there were 82.20 males.

Between 1990 and 2000, the population grew 61.3%. It is projected to be over 28,000 by 2010. The average family size is 2.9 persons. The median income for a household in the county was $46,372, and the median income for a family was $51,141. Males had a median income of $32,346 versus $24,774 for females. In 2000, there were 1,121 individuals below the poverty line which consisted of 280 children below the age of 18. In 1990, there were 1,287 individuals below the poverty line which consisted of 439 children below the age of 18.

According to the 2000 Census, the County median home value is $111,000 and the median mortgage is $900.00.

The county's school system consists of 3,490 students. There are currently 1 high school, 1 middle school, and 2 elementary schools one of which is an upper elementary school. Student/teacher ratio is 22–1. 17% of residents have a bachelor's degree or higher. As of 2000, 4,657 individuals over three years old enrolled in school, including 827 residents in college or graduate school. According to the 2000 Census, 1,066 students were enrolled in grades 9–12 and 603 in nursery school and kindergarten.

Fluvanna County High School is famous for its unique nickname, 'The Flying Flucos'. The Flying Flucos nickname has been recognized by ESPN as one of the top 10 unique High School nicknames in the country.

== Economy ==
Fluvanna has a workforce of 13,206 living in the county. 15% of the workforce lives and works inside the county borders. 84% of county residents work in another locality. In comparison, the equivalent of 22% are in-commuters.

In October 2020, Governor Ralph Northam announced Silk City Printing of Paterson, NJ would relocate to Fork Union, VA to occupy the plant vacated by Thomasville Furniture in 2007. This was Fluvanna's first economic development project announced by the Governor's Office. When fully operational, Silk City will be one of Fluvanna's top 10 employers.

Fluvanna County's Zion Crossroads Water and Sewer System water tower was named the top 10 best painted water towers in 2020 by Tnemec Corporation.

The top 10 employers in Fluvanna as of 2020:

1. Fluvanna School Board
2. Fluvanna Correctional Center for Women
3. County of Fluvanna
4. Fork Union Military Academy
5. AG Dillard Inc.
6. BFI Transfer Systems of Virginia (Republic Services)
7. Food Lion
8. Domino's Pizza
9. Lake Monticello Owners' Association
10. Fielders Choice Enterprises Inc

== Geography ==
According to the U.S. Census Bureau, the county has a total area of 290 square miles (750 km^{2}), of which 286 square miles (740 km^{2}) is land and 4.1 square miles (11 km^{2}) (1.4%) is water. Palmyra, is 54 miles (87 km) from Richmond and 80 miles (130 km) from Dulles International Airport. Lake Monticello, a private community, is 15 miles (24 km) from Charlottesville.

=== Adjacent counties ===
- Louisa County – north
- Goochland County – east
- Cumberland County – southeast
- Buckingham County – south
- Albemarle County – west

=== Major highways ===
- I-64
- US 15
- US 250
- SR 6
- SR 53

== Government and infrastructure ==
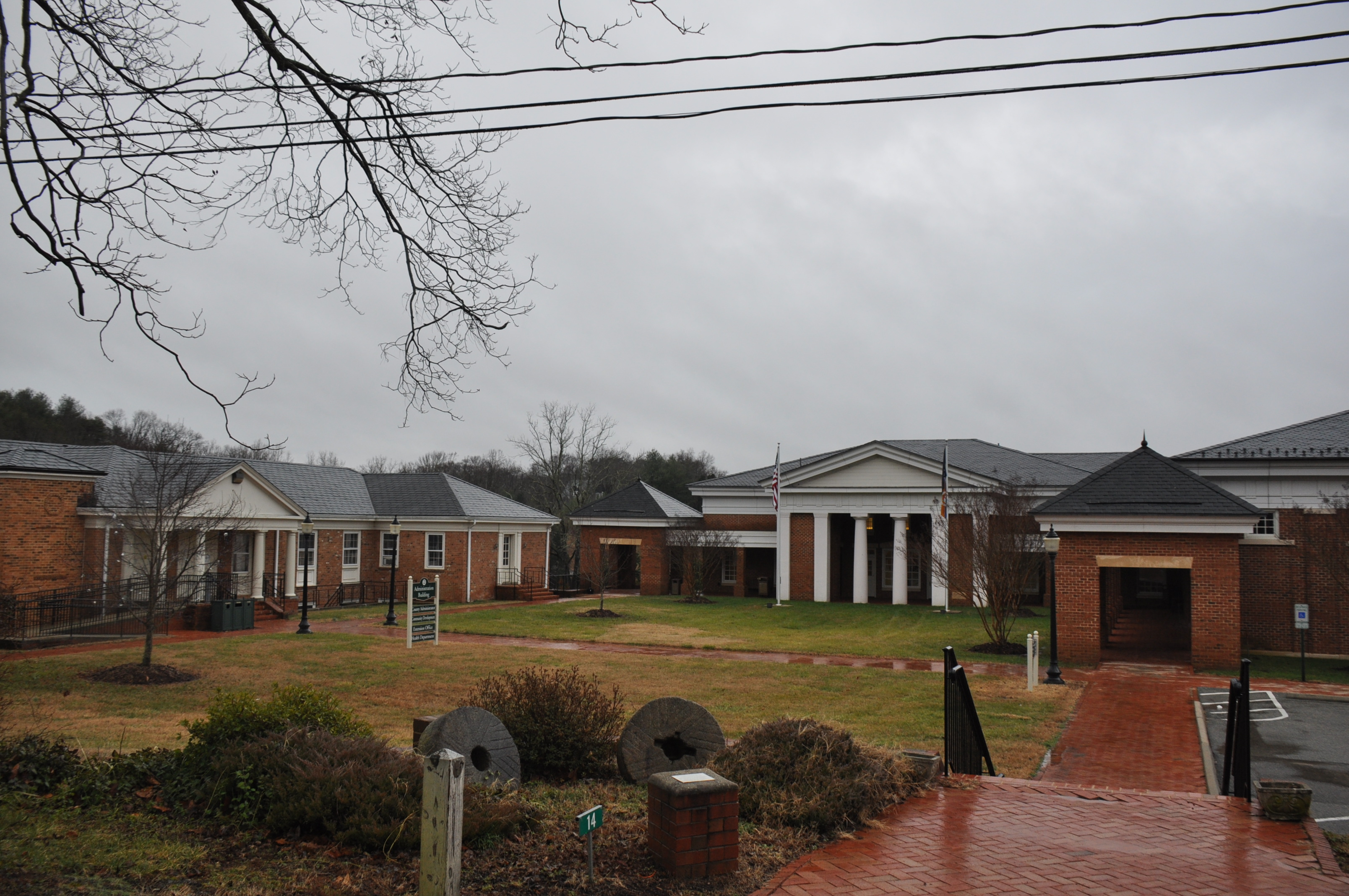
Fluvanna County administrative offices located at Palmyra.

The Virginia Department of Corrections operates the Fluvanna Correctional Center for Women in unincorporated Fluvanna County, near Troy. The center houses the female death row.

=== Board of Supervisors ===
- Columbia District: Mike Sheridan (I), Chair
- Cunningham District: Chris Fairchild
- Fork Union District: D. Michael Goad
- Palmyra District: Patricia Eager (R)
- Rivanna District: Tony O'Brien (I), Vice Chair

=== Constitutional officers ===
- Clerk of the Circuit Court: Tristana Treadway (I)
- Commissioner of the Revenue: Andrew M. "Mel" Sheridan Jr. (I)
- Commonwealth's Attorney: Jeffrey W. Haislip (I)
- Sheriff: Eric Hess (I)
- Treasurer: Linda H. Lenherr (I)

Fluvanna is represented by Republican Mark Peake in the Virginia Senate, Republicans Robert B. Bell III and R. Lee Ware Jr. in the Virginia House of Delegates, and Republican John McGuire in the U.S. House of Representatives.

United States presidential election results for Fluvanna County, Virginia
Year	Republican		Democratic		Third party(ies)	
Year	No.	%	No.	%	No.	%
1912	53	10.10%	409	77.90%	63	12.00%
1920	146	20.36%	562	78.38%	9	1.26%
1924	136	22.04%	452	73.26%	29	4.70%
1928	327	42.25%	447	57.75%	0	0.00%
1932	176	22.92%	579	75.39%	13	1.69%
1936	217	26.86%	586	72.52%	5	0.62%
1940	241	29.35%	579	70.52%	1	0.12%
1944	291	33.45%	577	66.32%	2	0.23%
1948	319	37.44%	447	52.46%	86	10.09%
1952	724	57.74%	519	41.39%	11	0.88%
1956	734	53.85%	417	30.59%	212	15.55%
1960	763	54.89%	614	44.17%	13	0.94%
1964	823	44.87%	1,008	54.96%	3	0.16%
1968	913	42.56%	569	26.53%	663	30.91%
1972	1,438	67.29%	637	29.81%	62	2.90%
1976	1,296	46.79%	1,415	51.08%	59	2.13%
1980	1,605	50.41%	1,424	44.72%	155	4.87%
1984	2,247	62.21%	1,332	36.88%	33	0.91%
1988	2,447	60.29%	1,562	38.48%	50	1.23%
1992	2,811	48.03%	2,134	36.47%	907	15.50%
1996	3,442	51.66%	2,676	40.16%	545	8.18%
2000	4,962	57.00%	3,431	39.41%	313	3.60%
2004	6,458	58.94%	4,415	40.29%	84	0.77%
2008	6,420	50.41%	6,185	48.57%	130	1.02%
2012	6,678	52.38%	5,893	46.22%	178	1.40%
2016	7,025	51.67%	5,760	42.36%	812	5.97%
2020	8,155	51.48%	7,414	46.81%	271	1.71%
2024	8,777	52.42%	7,731	46.17%	235	1.40%

== Notable people ==
- Elijah Anderson (Underground Railroad), (c. 1808 –1861) was a free African American man and leading conductor of the Underground Railroad (UGRR) who assisted at least 1,000 slaves to gain freedom. He was born in Fluvanna, Virginia and left after Nat Turner's slave rebellion when the state began imposing strict rules on free blacks.
- John Hartwell Cocke, a contemporary and friend of Thomas Jefferson, general in the War of 1812, businessman and architect. He designed Fluvanna County's Historic Courthouse and Old Stone Jail, and his own estate at Bremo Plantation.
- William Henry, brother of revolutionary Patrick Henry and served in the House of Burgesses.
- Texas Jack Omohundro, a notable frontier scout, actor, and cowboy was born on the Pleasure Hill farm in Palmyra.
- The singer Chris Daughtry, who came in fourth place on the fifth season of American Idol, resided in Fluvanna as a teenager; his parents still live there.
- Eddie George, Heisman Trophy winner and FUMA Alumnus
- Vinny Testaverde, Heisman Trophy winner and FUMA Alumnus
- Kevin Plank, CEO and founder of Under Armour and FUMA Alumnus
- Julia A. Wood (1840–1927), writer, composer
- John Jasper, ex-slave and preacher

== Communities ==

(Population according to the 2020 United States census)

Towns: 1. Scottsville (524)		Census-designated places (CDP): 1. Columbia (76); 2. Palmyra (127); 3. Lake Monticello (10,126)
Unincorporated Communities
Bremo Bluff; Carysbrook	Cohasset; Fork Union	Kents Store; Nahor	Troy; Zion Crossroads

== See also ==
- National Register of Historic Places listings in Fluvanna County, Virginia
