= U.S. Route 15 in Virginia =

Section of United States Numbered Highway in Virginia

U.S. Route 15
- US 15 highlighted in red

Route information
- Maintained by VDOT
- Length: 230.37 mi (370.74 km)
- Existed: 1926–present
- Tourist routes: Journey Through Hallowed Ground Byway; Virginia Byway

Major junctions
- South end: US 15 near Clarksville
- US 58 in Clarksville; US 360 in Keysville; US 460 in Farmville; US 60 near Dillwyn; I-64 / US 250 in Zion Crossroads; US 33 in Gordonsville; US 29 / US 522 in Culpeper; US 17 in Warrenton; I-66 in Haymarket; US 50 in Gilberts Corner
- North end: US 15 near Lucketts

Location
- Country: United States
- State: Virginia
- Counties: Mecklenburg, Halifax, Charlotte, Prince Edward, Buckingham, Fluvanna, Louisa, Orange, Madison, Culpeper, Fauquier, Prince William, Loudoun

Highway system
- United States Numbered Highway System; List; Special; Divided; Virginia Routes; Interstate; US; Primary; Secondary; Byways; History; HOT lanes
← SR 14	→ SR 16

U.S. Route 15 (US 15) is a part of the United States Numbered Highway System that runs from Walterboro, South Carolina, to Painted Post, New York. In Virginia, the U.S. Highway runs 230.37 miles (370.74 km) from the North Carolina state line near Clarksville north to the Maryland state line at the Potomac River near Lucketts. US 15 is a major north–south highway through the Piedmont of Virginia, connecting Clarksville and Farmville in Southside with Culpeper, Warrenton, and Leesburg in Northern Virginia.

== Route description ==
=== Clarksville to Farmville ===
US 15 enters Mecklenburg County at the North Carolina state line several miles south of Clarksville. The U.S. Highway continues south toward Oxford and the Research Triangle. US 15 heads north as two-lane undivided National Highway, which parallels the Virginia Southern Railroad north across the Grassy Creek branch of Kerr Lake. The U.S. Highway expands to a four-lane divided highway in an industrial area adjacent to Marks Municipal Airport. US 15 passes through a partial cloverleaf interchange with the US 58 bypass, then becomes an undivided highway on entering the town of Clarksville as College Street and crossing over the rail line. The U.S. Highway turns east onto Virginia Avenue, which also carries US 58 Business (US 58 Bus.) and State Route 49 (SR 49).

After passing through the Clarksville Historic District, US 15, US 58 Bus., and SR 49 leave the town of Clarksville by crossing the John H. Kerr Reservoir, an impoundment of the Roanoke River that is also known as Buggs Island Lake, on the Phillip Saint Julian Wilson Bridge and a causeway. The bridge, which contains lights underneath used for nighttime fishing, includes a brief passage through Halifax County due to the thalwegs of the Roanoke and Dan rivers, which were used to set the county boundaries, converging just south of Clarksville. At the east end of the causeway, access to US 58 is provided at a four-way intersection. Ramps to US 58 west and US 58 east form the southern and eastern legs of the intersection, which mainline US 58 avoids via a pair of flyover ramps just east of its bridge over the reservoir. US 15 and SR 49 turn north, cross over the Virginia Southern rail line, and parallel the eastern shore of the lake until the two highways split at the hamlet of Dortch Store.

US 15 heads north, crossing the Bluestone Creek arm of the reservoir and entering Charlotte County, where the road becomes Barnesville Highway. The U.S. Highway intersects SR 92 (Jeb Stuart Highway) at Barnes Junction and US 360 (Kings Highway) at Wylliesburg. The two U.S. Highways continue north along US 360's four-lane divided highway, which intersects SR 47 (Craftons Gate Highway) at Crafton Gate. South of Keysville, US 15 and US 360 meet the southern end of US 15 Bus. and US 360 Bus. (Old Kings Highway); the sets of highways meet again at a partial interchange where the U.S. Highways also cross over the Virginia Southern Railroad. US 15 and US 360 meet SR 40 (Lunenburg County Highway) at a diamond interchange just east of the town of Keysville. The U.S. Highways pass under the rail line and diverge immediately to the north at a partial cloverleaf interchange; the divided highway continues as US 360 while US 15 exits onto two-lane undivided Farmville Highway, which meets the northern end of the business routes, which are named 4 Locust Highway.

US 15 enters Prince Edward County as Farmville Road and crosses over Norfolk Southern Railway's Blue Ridge District west of the hamlet of Briery. The U.S. Highway passes through the hamlets of Redd Shop and Worsham before reaching Kingsville, where the highway intersects SR 133. SR 133 heads west to the community of Hampden Sydney and its namesake college. US 15 veers northeast and meets US 460 (Prince Edward Highway) at a diamond interchange. US 15 joins US 460 west on the four-lane freeway while US 15 Bus. heads toward the town of Farmville, home of Longwood University. US 15 and US 460 cross over Little Buffalo Creek, Buffalo Creek, and the High Bridge Trail, a rail trail on what was formerly a Norfolk Southern Railway line. The U.S. Highways diverge at a trumpet interchange west of Farmville. US 15 exits onto Sheppards Road and has a brief concurrency with US 460 Bus. north to the northern end of US 15 Bus. (Third Street).

=== Farmville to Culpeper ===
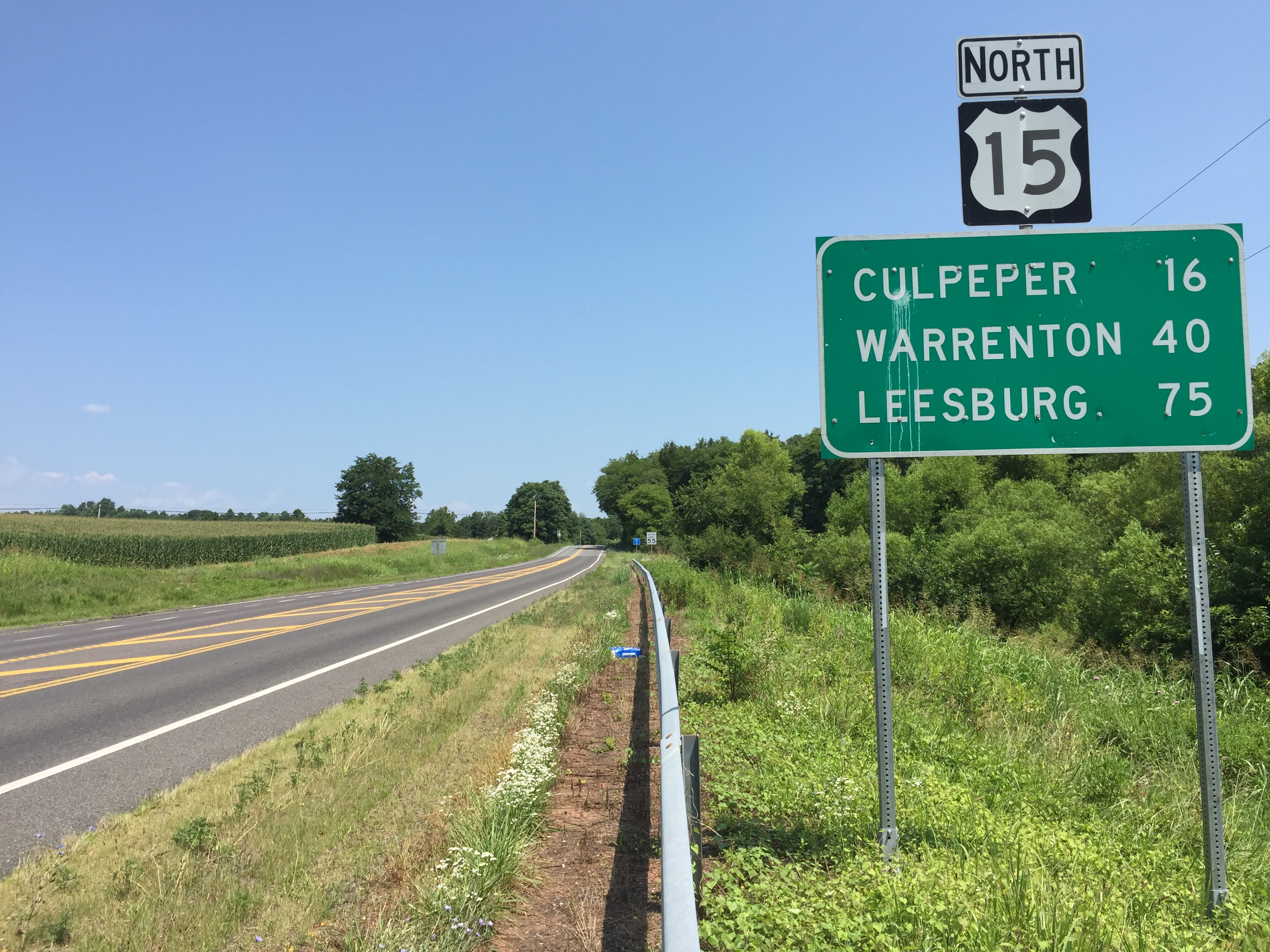
View north along US 15 north of SR 230 in Madison Mills, Madison County

US 15 crosses the Appomattox River into Buckingham County, where the road's name changes to James Madison Highway. The highway passes to the west of Willis Mountain before reaching US 60 (James Anderson Highway) at Sprouses Corner. US 15 meets the southern end of SR 20 (Constitution Route) then passes through the town of Dillwyn as Oak and Main streets. The U.S. Highway parallels the Buckingham Branch Railroad out of town and passes through the community of Alpha, where the highway passes by Buffards Mountain and veers away from the railroad. After passing through Arvonia, the highway crosses the James River at New Canton on the John H. Cocke Memorial Bridge. The bridge passes over the Buckingham Branch Railroad on the south side of the river just south of its bridge across the river to join CSX Transportation's Rivanna Subdivision, which parallels the north bank of the river through the hamlet of Bremo Bluff.

US 15 continues north through the Fluvanna County communities of Weber City and Fork Union. The U.S. Highway becomes concurrent with SR 6 (River Road) adjacent to Fork Union Military Academy. The two highways diverge at Dixie, from which US 15 passes through Carysbrook. The highway meets the eastern end of SR 53 (Thomas Jefferson Parkway) just south of the U.S. Highway's crossing of the Rivanna River into Palmyra. US 15 passes through Wildwood and Hunters before intersecting US 250 (Three Notch Road) at Zion Crossroads at the Fluvanna–Louisa county line. The U.S. Highway expands to a four-lane divided highway at US 250 that continues north through its diverging diamond interchange (DDI) with Interstate 64 (I-64). US 15 continues north along the edge of Green Springs National Historic Landmark District to its intersection with SR 22 (Louisa Road) at Boswells Tavern. The U.S. Highway meets US 33 (Spotswood Trail) just south of Gordonsville. The two highways run together north onto Orange County and the town of Gordonsville, where the highways parallel CSX Transportation's Piedmont Subdivision along Martinsburg Avenue. US 15 and US 33 veer onto Main Street and pass the Exchange Hotel at their underpass of the Washington Subdivision, the Charlottesville–Orange rail line owned by the Buckingham Branch Railroad. US 15 leaves Main Street at the Gordonsville Roundabout; US 33 and SR 231 head northwest as Main Street, SR 231 heads southwest along Gordon Avenue toward Cismont, and US 15 heads northeast along Gordon Avenue, which becomes James Madison Highway at the town limit.

North of Gordonsville, US 15 expands to a four-lane divided highway that parallels the Washington Subdivision and the eastern flank of the Southwest Mountains and passes Gordonsville Municipal Airport. The U.S. Highway becomes an undivided highway and passes the historic home Mayhurst at the southern limit of the town of Orange, where the highway becomes Caroline Street. US 15 meets SR 20 (Berry Hill Road) and runs concurrently with the state highway as a two-lane street under Norfolk Southern Railway's Washington District. SR 20 continues north on Caroline Street while the US 15 veers northeast onto four-lane Madison Road, which intersects SR 20 Bus. (Main Street) before leaving Orange as a two-lane road. US 15 crosses the Rapidan River into Madison County and meets the eastern end of SR 230 (Orange Road) at Madison Mills. The U.S. Highway passes through Five Forks, home of Woodberry Forest School. North of Locust Dale, US 15 crosses the Robinson River and its tributary Crooked Run; at the latter stream, the U.S. Highway enters Culpeper County. The highway passes to the west of Cedar Mountain and meets the southern end of SR 299 (Madison Road) before reaching a diamond interchange with US 29 (James Monroe Highway), where US 15 Bus. continues north into the town of Culpeper.

=== Culpeper to Maryland ===
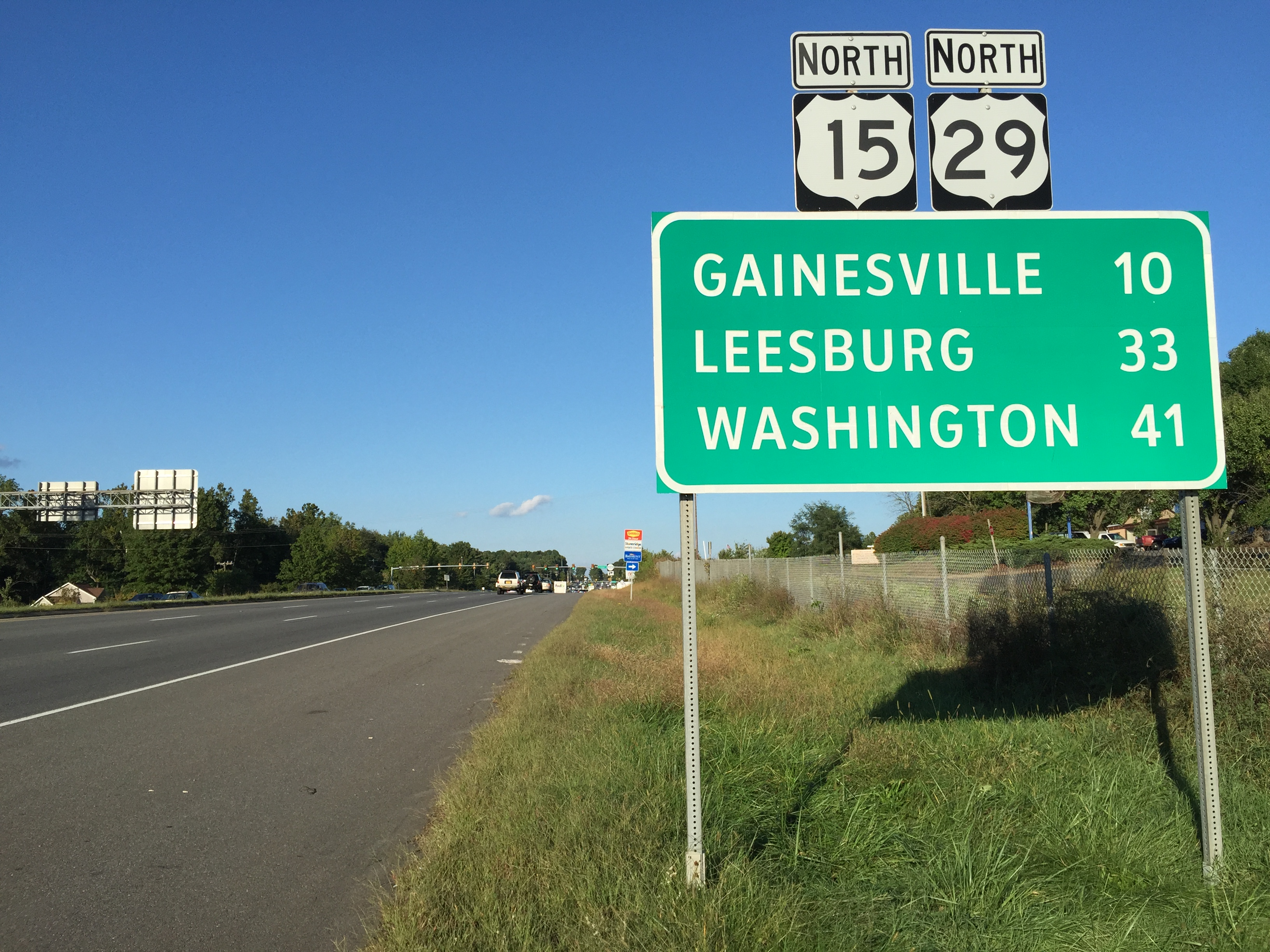
US 15/US 29 northbound at SR 793 north of Warrenton

US 15 and US 29 run concurrently as a four-lane divided highway around the east side of Culpeper, where the highways cross over the Washington District rail line and meet US 522 and SR 3 (Germanna Highway) at a diamond interchange. US 15 and US 29 pass under the rail line and meet the northern end of US 15 Bus. and US 29 Bus. at a partial cloverleaf interchange. The highways parallel the Washington District through Brandy Station and by Culpeper Regional Airport to the town of Remington, where the road crosses the Rappahannock River into Fauquier County. US 15 and US 29 pass to the north of the town, which is directly served by US 15 Bus. and US 29 Bus. (James Madison Street). Immediately north of the northern junction with the business routes, US 15 and US 29 meet the southern end of SR 28 (Catlett Road), which follows the rail line toward Manassas.

US 15 and US 29 become concurrent with US 17, which heads southeast as Marsh Road toward Fredericksburg, at Opal on their way to Warrenton. South of the town, US 15 Bus./US 17 Bus./US 29 Bus. splits northwest and their respective U.S. Highways bypass the town on a freeway to the east. US 15, US 17, and US 29 have a diamond interchange with SR 643 (Meetze Road/Lee Street) before reaching a directional interchange where US 17 diverges from the other U.S. Highways toward Winchester and US 15 and US 29 receive their business routes. US 15 and US 29 head northeast as Lee Highway, which passes through New Baltimore and intersects SR 215 (Vint Hill Road) just west of Buckland, where the highways enter Prince William County cross Broad Run. Just east of the county line, US 29 continues east as Lee Highway toward Washington while US 15 turns north onto two-lane James Madison Highway.

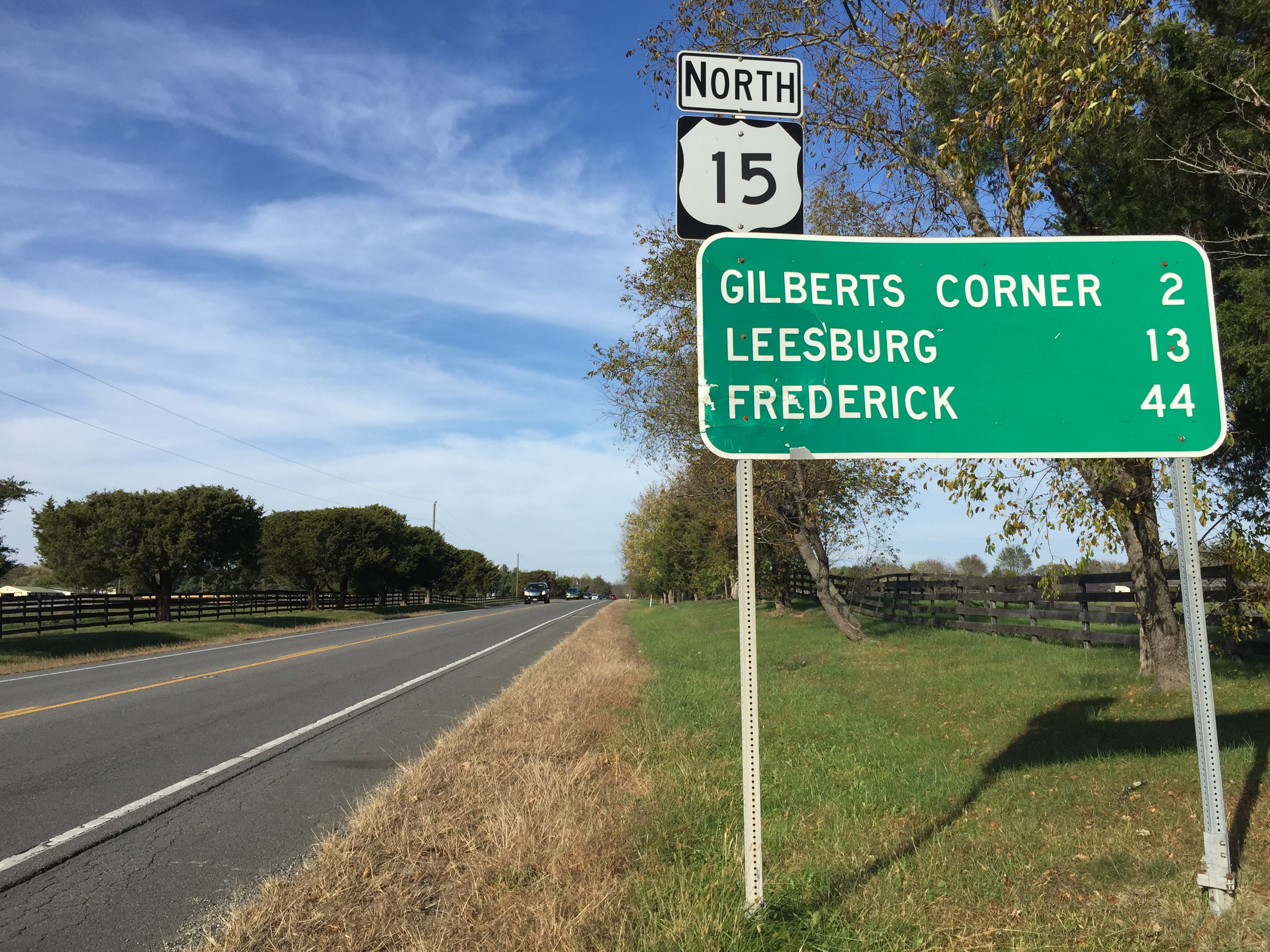
US 15 northbound between SR 600 and SR 615 in southern Loudoun County

US 15 continues north through Haymarket, where the highway expands to a four-lane divided highway immediately south of its intersection with SR 55 (John Marshall Highway). The U.S. Highway passes through a diamond interchange with I-66 and runs through a suburban area between Catharpin to the east and the Bull Run Mountains to the west. At Woolsey, US 15 meets the northern end of SR 234 (Sudley Road) and reduces to two lanes. North of Bull Run, where the road enters Loudoun County, the highway passes through a pair of roundabouts at Gilberts Corner. US 15 meets US 50 (John Mosby Highway) at the second roundabout. The U.S. Highway runs along the east flank of the Bull Run Mountains as it passes James Monroe's estate of Oak Hill just south of the Little River and Oatlands Historic House & Gardens in the community of Oatlands at its crossing of Goose Creek.

At Virts Corner east of Hogback Mountain, US 15 enters the town of Leesburg as South King Street. At SR 7 (Leesburg Bypass), US 15 Bus. continues straight into the downtown area while US 15 joins the eastern side of the four-lane divided bypass. US 15 and SR 7 meet the western end of SR 267 (Dulles Greenway) at a trumpet interchange before the two highways diverge at a partial cloverleaf interchange with SR 7 Bus. (Harry Byrd Highway) that contains a flyover ramp for westbound SR 7. US 15 reduces to two lanes shortly before it meets the northern end of US 15 Bus. (North King Street) west of Ball's Bluff Battlefield and National Cemetery. Just north of the business route, the highway intersects SR 655 (Whites Ferry Road), which serves White's Ferry, the last remaining ferry crossing of the Potomac River that connects Leesburg with Poolesville, Maryland. US 15 passes by the historic homes Rockland and Temple Hall and through the community of Lucketts, which is home to the historic Lucketts School and reopened Lucketts Store. North of Lucketts, the U.S. Highway veers to the west and runs along the eastern flank of Furnace Mountain. The road meets SR 672, which provides access to Lovettsville, before crossing the Potomac River on the Point of Rocks Bridge, a camelback truss bridge, into the Maryland village of Point of Rocks.

== History ==
US 15 generally follows the Old Carolina Road, which connected North Carolina (at what was then North Carolina Highway 75, or NC 75) with Frederick, Maryland, through Virginia. It was added to the state highway system in 1918 as State Route 2 (SR 2) and renumbered State Route 32 (SR 32) in the 1923 state highway renumbering. In 1926, US 15 was designated along the whole of SR 32. The SR 32 designation was dropped in the 1933 state highway renumbering and was immediately reused on another route south of Petersburg. The number was again reused on its current alignment in the early 1940s to match NC 32.

From June 2013 to February 2014, the Virginia Department of Transportation converted the existing interchange between US 15 and I-64, in Zion Crossroads, to a DDI, the first in the state, with final construction completed by mid-April 2014. A similar interchange between US 15 and I-66 was completed in January 2017.

== Major intersections ==
County	Location	mi	km	Destinations	Notes
Mecklenburg		0.00	0.00	US 15 south – Oxford	North Carolina state line
Mecklenburg	Clarksville			US 58 (SR 49) – South Boston, Boydton	interchange
Mecklenburg	Clarksville	6.08	9.78	US 58 Bus. west (Virginia Avenue) to SR 49 south – Danville	south end of US 58 Bus. overlap
Mecklenburg	Clarksville	7.80	12.55	US 58 to US 15 south – Boydton, South Boston, South Hill, Occoneechee State Park	north end of US 58 Bus. overlap; south end of SR 49 overlap
Mecklenburg		9.40	15.13	SR 49 north – Chase City, Victoria	North end of concurrency with SR 49
Charlotte	Barnes Junction	23.62	38.01	SR 92 (Jeb Stuart Highway) – Clover, Chase City	
Charlotte		26.86	43.23	US 360 west (Kings Highway) / SR 611 west (Hebron Church Road) – Danville, South Boston	South end of concurrency with US 360
Charlotte	Crafton Gate	30.74	49.47	SR 47 (Craftons Gate Highway) – Drakes Branch, Chase City	
Charlotte	Ontario	37.34	60.09	US 15 Bus. north / US 360 Bus. east (Old Kings Highway) / SR 622 west (Old Kings Road) – Keysville	
Charlotte				US 15 Bus. / US 360 Bus. – Keysville	Interchange; no southbound entrance
Charlotte		40.70	65.50	SR 40 – Keysville, Victoria	interchange
Charlotte		42.72	68.75	US 360 west / SR 712 south – Richmond	interchange; north end of concurrency with US 360; south end of US 360 Bus. overlap
Charlotte				US 15 Bus. south / US 360 Bus. west (Four Locust Highway) – Keysville	north end of US 360 Bus. overlap
Prince Edward	Kingsville	56.54	90.99	SR 133 south (Kingsville Road) – Hampden-Sydney	
Prince Edward		59.48	95.72	US 460 east / US 15 Bus. north (Main Street) – Farmville, Petersburg, Longwood University, truck route to SR 45	interchange; south end of concurrency with US 460
Prince Edward		63.66	102.45	US 460 west – Lynchburg	interchange; north end of concurrency with US 460; south end of concurrency with US 460 Business
Prince Edward		63.80	102.68	US 15 Bus. south / US 460 Bus. east (Third Street) / SR 768 (Tuggle Road) – Farmville, Center for the Visual Arts, Longwood University	North end of concurrency with US 460 Business
Buckingham	Sprouses Corner	80.33	129.28	US 60 (James Anderson Highway) – Lexington, Richmond	
Buckingham		81.78	131.61	SR 20 north (South Constitution Route) / SR 1003 east (Main Street) – Scottsville, Buckingham Correctional Center, Dillwyn Correctional Center	
James River		98.13	157.92	John H. Cocke Memorial Bridge	
Fluvanna	Fork Union	102.67	165.23	SR 6 west (West River Road) – Scottsville	South end of concurrency with SR 6
Fluvanna	Dixie	104.66	168.43	SR 6 east (East River Road) – Richmond	North end of concurrency with SR 6
Fluvanna		111.02	178.67	SR 53 west (Thomas Jefferson Parkway) – Charlottesville, Ash Lawn, Monticello, Michie Tavern	
Louisa	Zion Cross Road	119.71	192.65	US 250 (Three Notch Road) – Charlottesville, Richmond	
Louisa		120.16	193.38	I-64 – Charlottesville, Richmond	I-64 exit 136 (Diverging diamond interchange)
Louisa	Boswells Tavern	127.11	204.56	SR 22 (Louisa Road) – Shadwell, Louisa	
Louisa		130.72	210.37	US 33 east (South Spotswood Trail) – Louisa, Richmond	South end of concurrency with US 33
Orange	Gordonsville			SR 1006 (South High Street / truck route)	
Orange	Gordonsville	132.29	212.90	US 33 west / SR 231 (North Main Street / Gordon Avenue) – Harrisonburg, Cismont	Gordonsville Circle (traffic circle); north end of concurrency with US 33
Orange	Orange	140.64	226.34	SR 20 north (Berry Hill Road) – Wilderness, Orange Airport	South end of concurrency with SR 20
Orange	Orange	140.81	226.61	SR 20 south (Caroline Street) – Barboursville	North end of concurrency with SR 20
Orange	Orange			SR 20 Bus. (Main Street)	
Madison	Madison Mills	144.47	232.50	SR 230 west (Orange Road) – Madison	
Culpeper		157.24	253.05	SR 299 north (Madison Road) to US 29 / SR 692	
Culpeper		158.06	254.37	US 29 south / US 15 Bus. north (Orange Road) – Culpeper, Charlottesville	interchange; south end of concurrency with US 29
see US 29
Prince William		192.09	309.14	US 29 north (Lee Highway) – Fairfax, Washington	North end of concurrency with US 29
Prince William		194.86	313.60	SR 55 (John Marshall Highway) – Front Royal, Haymarket	
Prince William	Haymarket	195.02	313.85	I-66 – Strasburg, Washington	I-66 exit 40, (Diverging diamond interchange)
Prince William	Woolsey	198.91	320.11	SR 234 south (Sudley Road) / Waterfall Road (SR 601) – Manassas	
Loudoun				Howsers Branch Drive to US 50	Roundabout
Loudoun	Gilberts Corner	205.74	331.11	US 50 – Winchester, Washington	Roundabout
Loudoun	Leesburg	216.28	348.07	SR 7 west (Leesburg Bypass) / US 15 Bus. north (South King Street) – Leesburg, Winchester	interchange; south end of concurrency with SR 7
Loudoun	Leesburg	216.72	348.78	SR 267 Toll east – Dulles Airport, Washington	SR 267 exit 1
Loudoun	Leesburg	217.88	350.64	SR 7 east / SR 7 Bus. west / Fort Evans Road – Leesburg, Tysons Corner, Alexandria	interchange; north end of concurrency with SR 7
Loudoun		220.40	354.70	US 15 Bus. south (North King Street) – Leesburg	
Loudoun				SR 655 (White's Ferry Road) / SR 1170 (Raspberry Drive) – Raspberry Falls, Whites Ferry	
Loudoun		230.37	370.74	US 15 north (Catoctin Mountain Highway) – Frederick	Maryland state line (Point of Rocks Bridge over Potomac River)
1.000 mi = 1.609 km; 1.000 km = 0.621 mi: Concurrency terminus; Incomplete access

== See also ==
- Special routes of U.S. Route 15

Spurs of SR 32 between 1923 and 1928

- State Route 321, Zion east to Oilville, now part of US 250
- State Route 322, Sprouses Corner west to Buckingham, now part of US 60
- State Route 323, Keysville east to Blackstone, now part of SR 40
- State Route 324, Clarksville east to Boydton, now part of US 58
- State Route 325, Leesburg west to Berryville, now part of SR 7
- State Route 326, short spur east to Palmyra, now part of SR 601
- State Route 327, Bealeton southeast to Falmouth, now part of US 17

U.S. Route 15
Previous state: North Carolina	Virginia	Next state: Maryland
