= Luckett (disambiguation) =

Luckett or Lucketts may refer to:

== People ==
- LeToya Luckett (born 1981), American musician and actress
- Johnny Luckett, an American actor; see The Second Civil War
- Phil Luckett, official in the National Football League
- Jammes Luckett, American musician
- Oliver Luckett (born 1974), American entrepreneur
- Pete Luckett (born 1953), British-Canadian entrepreneur and media personality
- Philip N. Luckett (c. 1823–1869), American soldier and physician
- H.P. Luckett (1847–1925), American physician
- Bill Luckett (1903–1985), English professional footballer
- Lt. Col. William Thomas Luckett, Jr (1928-2000), US Air Force Officer and Vietnam Veteran
- Stephen Q. Luckett (1938–2025), American painter, illustrator, actor, and businessperson

== Places ==
- Luckett, Cornwall, United Kingdom
- Lucketts, Virginia, United States
  - Lucketts School
  - Lucketts Store

== See also ==
- Luckett & Farley, an American architectural firm
- Lucketts Travel, a British bus operating company
