= Taylorstown Store =

Historic commercial building in Virginia, United States

- U.S. Historic district – Contributing property
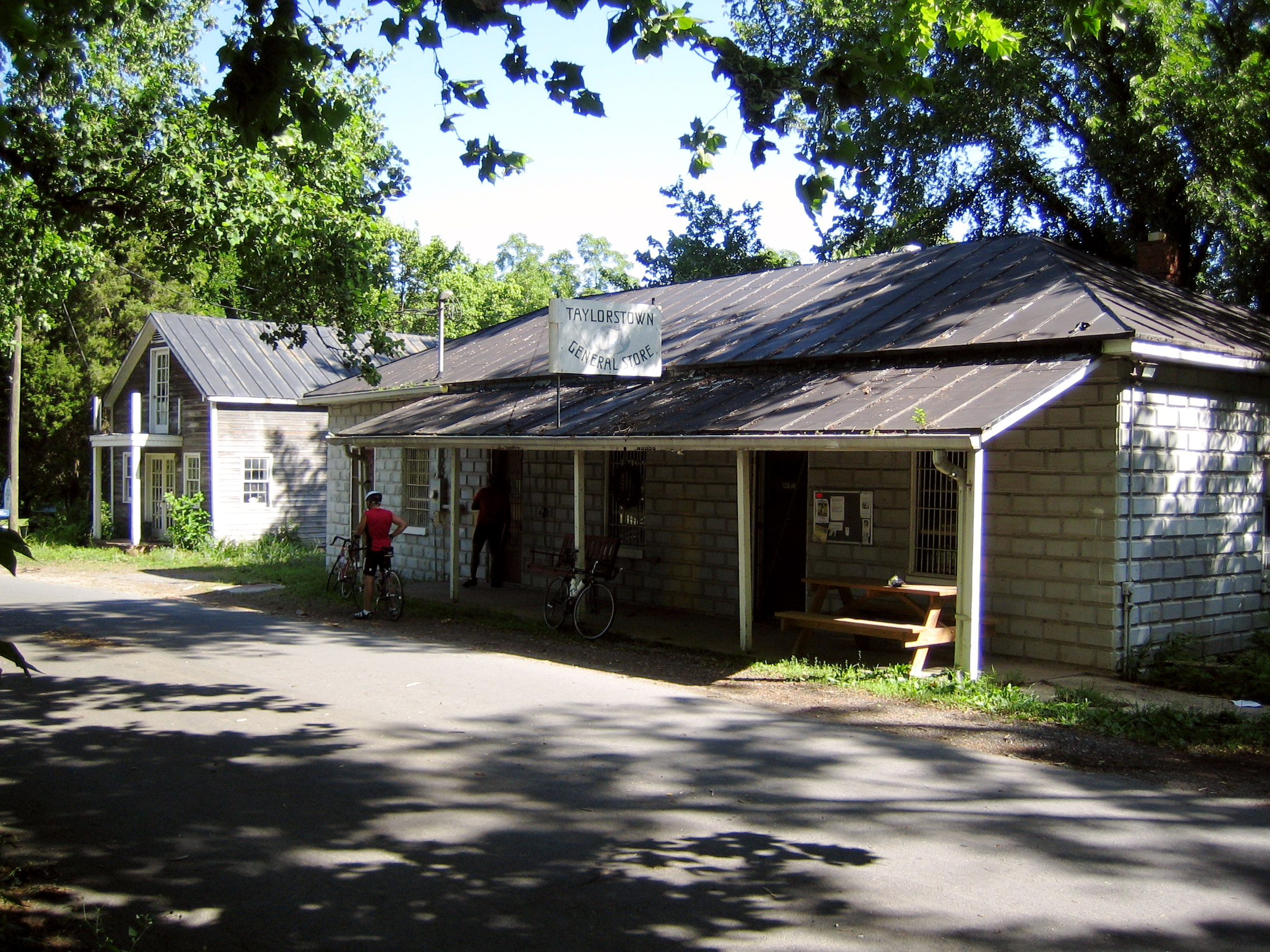
- Taylorstown General Store
- Location: Taylorstown and Loyalty Roads, Taylorstown, Virginia
- Part of: Taylorstown Historic District (ID78003027, boundary increase 05000474)
- Added to NRHP: January 30, 1978, boundary increase May 26, 2005

The Taylorstown Store is a historic structure at the junction of Taylorstown and Loyalty Roads in Taylorstown, Virginia, a small village in northwestern Loudoun County, Virginia. The general store has served as a focal point for community affairs for more than 200 years. Today, it is open only for special events, such as the annual Taylorstown Art and Craft Fair on the first weekend in December.

== History ==
The original two-story building on the site was built in the late 18th or early 19th century. It served as a general store and post office, and was used for a time as a theater and later a movie house. Immediately to the east is a one-story concrete building built in 1904 to replace an earlier building that was destroyed by fire. Both structures are listed on the National Register of Historic Places as contributing properties to Taylorstown Historic District.

Thomas Hickman and John Slater operated the store until 1899, at which point the partnership dissolved and the Hickmans took over. They saw the store through reconstruction before transferring ownership to the Mann family in 1938. Annie Elizabeth Mann served as proprietor until her death in 1976. The property was then purchased and reopened in 1979 under the management of Curt and Elizabeth Callaham. It closed in 1999.

The Taylorstown Community Store, Inc. (TCSI), a 501(c)(3) non-profit organization, bought the store and the neighboring two-story frame structure in 2003 and sold it to Tedd and Dana Durden in 2009. As of 2017, the property is being renovated.
