= Virginia State Route 19 =

The following highways in Virginia have been known as State Route 19:

- State Route 19 (Virginia 1918-1933), now part of State Route 6 (Dixie to Richmond)
- U.S. Route 19 in Virginia, late 1920s - present
