= Fork Union =

Fork Union may refer to:

- Fork Union, Virginia
  - Fork Union Military Academy, a military preparatory school in Fork Union
