= Wildwood, Virginia =

Wildwood, Virginia may refer to:

- Wildwood, Roanoke, Virginia
- Wildwood, Fluvanna County, Virginia
