= Black Swamp =

Black Swamp or Great Black Swamp may refer to:

- Great Black Swamp, an area of Northern Ohio
- Black Swamp Area Council, a Boy Scout organization in Ohio
- Black Swamp Arts Festival, a music and arts festival in Bowling Green, Ohio
- Lucketts, Virginia, an unincorporated historic hamlet in Loudoun County, Virginia originally known as Black Swamp
