= Whiskey Hill =

Historic house in Virginia, United States

- U.S. Historic district – Contributing property
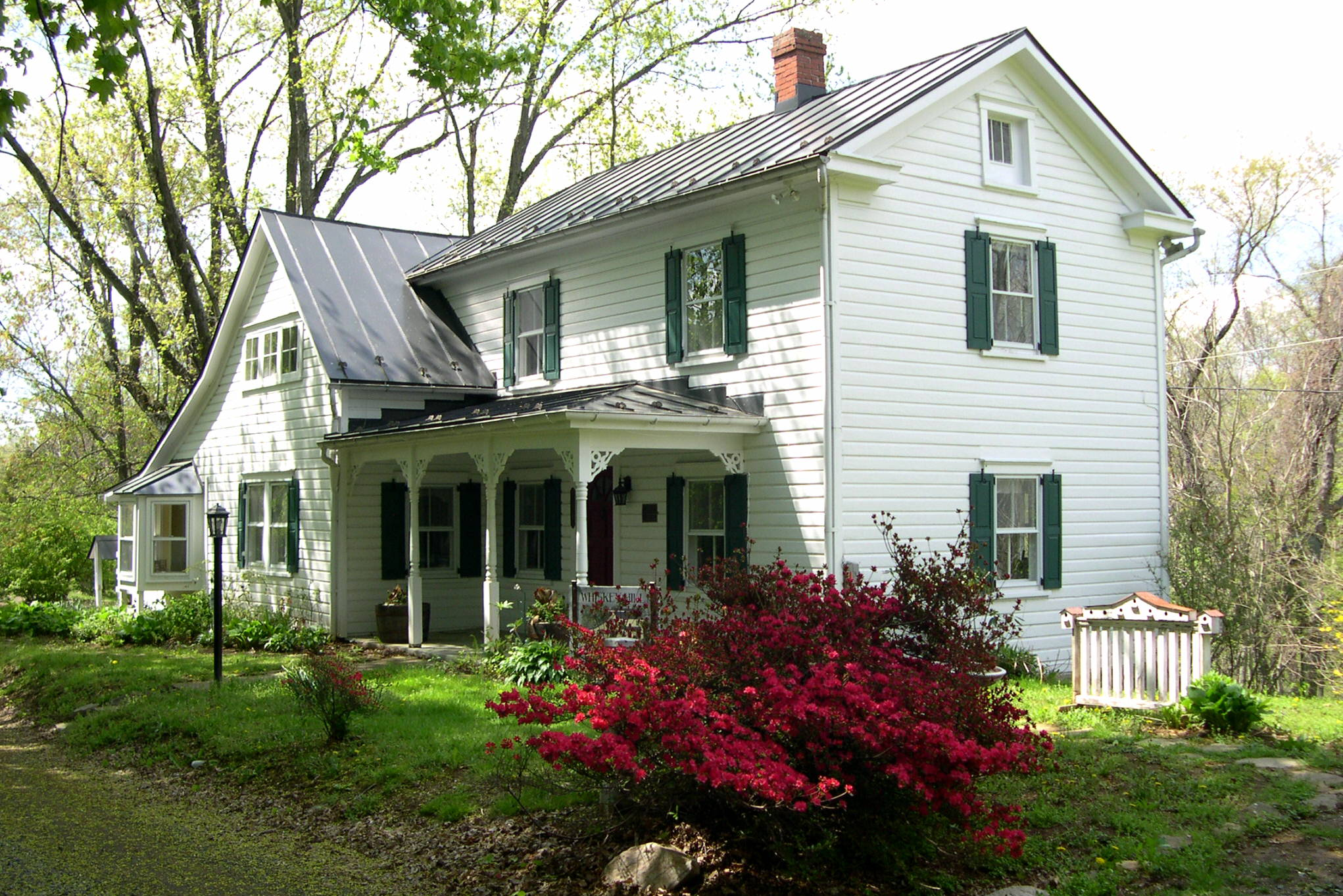
- Part of: Taylorstown Historic District (Taylorstown, Virginia) (ID05000474)
- Added to NRHP: May 26, 2005 (Taylorstown HD expansion)

Whiskey Hill is a historic house in Taylorstown, Virginia. The house was added as a contributing property to the Taylorstown Historic District in 2004 when the district was expanded to include it and several neighboring structures.

At the dawn of the 19th century, a small log cabin stood on a hill overlooking Catoctin Creek and Taylor Town, a tiny settlement in northern Loudoun County, Virginia. The cabin, which has been expanded several times, was owned by distillers and their families into the 20th century. Its current owner named it Whiskey Hill.

== 1700s ==
Archaeologists from Mount Vernon visited Whiskey Hill in 2004 while conducting research for the reconstruction of George Washington's distillery; they confirmed that the house dates to the late 18th century. However, no signs of the distillery operation remain, though a spring on the property features stone walls consistent with a spring house. Relatives of previous residents report that they were not allowed into the bottom level of the spring house where whiskey was reportedly stored.

In the early 1790s, the land where the cabin is located belonged to Charles Bennet, 4th Earl of Tankerville, and his brother, Henry Astley Bennett. Neither Englishman ever set foot on it. Their father had purchased the land from John Colvill, who once owned 44,000 acres (180 km^{2}) in the dominion.

In 1792, the brothers used the Alexandria law firm Hooe and Little to sell 61 acres (250,000 m^{2}) to Joseph and Henry Taylor, two sons of Thomas Taylor. The elder Taylor owned 300 acres (1.2 km^{2}) on the east side of Catoctin Creek and built a mill there; both the area and the mill would take Thomas Taylor's name. Henry bought out Joseph's interest in the land five years later for the price of 77 pounds in the then-current money of Virginia.

== 1800s ==
Henry Taylor died in 1812, but his estate was not settled until 17 years later. It appears that Taylor's cabin on the west side of the Catoctin was rented during part of this time by a tenant named Andrew Collins, whose name appears on a deed dated 1819. This document is the first written reference to the house now called Whiskey Hill. Andrew Collins and Levi Collins may have had a life estate on the house. By 1829, it was occupied by Jacob Carnes; Henry Taylor's family officially sold it to him in 1832. Carnes' descendants would own it until 1962.

In the inventory of Henry Taylor's assets made after his death, a 60-US-gallon (230 L) still and a 110-US-gallon (420 L) still were listed, as were a wheat fan, oats, barrels, funnels and 12 barrels (1.9 m^{3}) of barley. All of these items were essential in the making of beer, ale, and whiskey.

In the early 19th century, the two most important cash crops going from the Piedmont to Tidewater were wheat flour and whiskey. Because food storage was always an issue for people of this time, any surpluses could be converted to whiskey and then used as currency. The operation on the hill overlooking the Catoctin was well sited for distilling spirits and sending them to market via Catoctin Creek and the Potomac River.

The 1816 inventory of Jacob Carnes' late father, Abraham, lists debts to John Hamilton, who built a mill further south on Catoctin Creek. The area around Taylorstown featured enough harvesting and enough water power from the creek to support two mills, Hamilton's and the older Taylor's Mill. Jacob Carnes died in 1832, shortly after his purchase of the log cabin, and his estate was proven by three men, including John Hamilton's son. This suggests a relationship between Carnes, the owner of a distilling operation, and the Hamilton family, which operated a mill that rendered the ingredients for whiskey.

After Jacob Carnes' death, his son, Samuel, owned the property. In 1851, tax records recorded the value of the Carnes property, including its outbuildings and improvements, at $500. In 1856, there is a reference to the Carnes family having livestock (Daniel had 10 cattle and one horse). They also all had watches. All of them were likely in trades or were merchants.

In 1860, Abram E. Carnes (possibly a son of Samuel) was listed as the only white man living on the property; women and children were not taxed, and Carnes did not have slaves. His 19.75 acres (79,900 m^{2}) was valued at $45 an acre. He owned a $20 watch, his furniture was worth $35, and the house was worth $500. He did not own cattle, hogs or a carriage. He was likely a merchant.

== 1900s ==
By 1920, the tax descriptions of the house begin to refer to it as "Near Taylorstown," not near Catoctin Creek. The value of the Carnes land dropped to $24 an acre, a decrease that may reflect market conditions that made non-flat land less valuable. Flatter land was easier to farm with mechanized equipment, such as tractors.

Abram died in 1908, but the property remained within his estate until at least 1936. Charles R. Carnes, his son by his first wife, took ownership of the house and lived in it until his death in 1937. His estate, which included bonds in Brazil, Poland, and Bolivia, suggested he had unusual liquidity than was typical of a merchant non-farmer. Some of the bonds had maturation dates in the 1960s.

Ownership of the house passed to Charles' half-brother, Edgar, by 1938. He sold off two pieces of property by 1944, when the remainder was valued at $974. The pieces that were sold likely featured buildings, which may have been remnants of a distilling operation. Because of the introduction of government regulation by this time, it was unlikely any distilling occurred. Edgar worked as a painter.

By 1950, Edgar had 6.875 acres (27,820 m^{2}) of land left after a series of small land sales, including one sale of 0.125-acre (510 m^{2}) for $3. The value of his holdings dropped from $974 to $660; this value would hold steady until at least 1959. Edgar and his wife, Sarah, sold the house and property to Alonza B. West and Colleen Gile West for $3,000 in 1962.

Brad and Lynn Curl purchased the home in 1980 and installed indoor plumbing and a kitchen.

== 21st century ==
Richard Weaver purchased the house in December 2003 and subsequently named it Whiskey Hill. Since then, the structure has been completely renovated. A new wing, including a library, was completed in January 2009.
