= Fork Union, Virginia =

Unincorporated community in Virginia, United States

- Unincorporated community
- Location within the Commonwealth of Virginia Fork Union (the United States)
- Coordinates: 37°45′48″N 78°15′44″W
- Country: United States
- State: Virginia
- County: Fluvanna
- Time zone: UTC−5 (Eastern (EST))
  - Summer (DST): UTC−4 (EDT)
- ZIP codes: 23055
- GNIS feature ID: 1496900

Fork Union is an unincorporated community in southern Fluvanna County, Virginia, United States, along U.S. Highway 15. Its ZIP code is 23055; the population within that ZIP code was 1148 according to the 2000 Census. It is known mainly as the home of Fork Union Military Academy, Fork Union Animal Clinic and formerly had one of the few surviving drive-in theatres in Virginia (1.5 miles south of town in an area known as Weber City). Fork Union has seen business presence decline in the area since 2020. While the village was home to a post office, a bank, a small grocery store, a supermarket, a dollar store and two independently owned restaurants, the Truist bank, the grocers, and one of the two restaurants have since closed their doors as of October 2025. The Village of Fork Union is the location of Fluvanna County's only Presbyterian congregation, Fork Union Presbyterian Church. The James River is just a few miles from Fork Union.

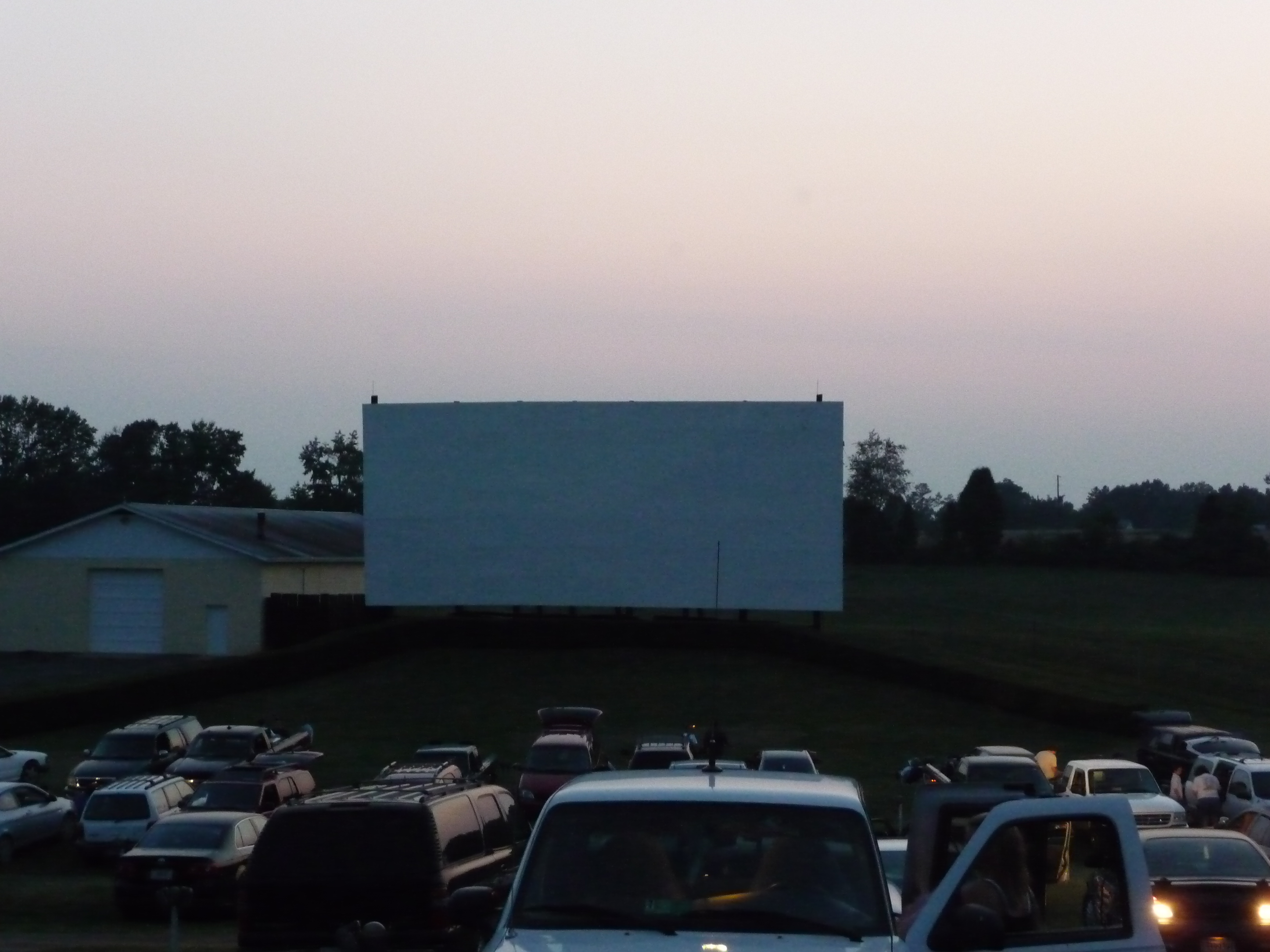
Fork Union's drive-in

Melrose and Western View are listed on the National Register of Historic Places.
