= Kingsville, Virginia =

Unincorporated community in Virginia, United States

Kingsville
- Unincorporated community
- Location within the Commonwealth of Virginia Kingsville (the United States)
- Coordinates: 37°14′46″N 78°26′38″W
- Country: United States
- State: Virginia
- County: Prince Edward
- Time zone: UTC−5 (Eastern (EST))
  - Summer (DST): UTC−4 (EDT)

Kingsville is an unincorporated community in Prince Edward County, Virginia, United States. It sits on the intersection of VA 133 and US 15

== Historical significance ==
- Before the American Revolution, Kingsville was the site of "King's Tavern."
- The British cavalryman, Banastre Tarleton, while raiding, camped in Kingsville in 1781, in the same year sick and wounded French soldiers were brought here from Yorktown. Seventy of them are buried in Kingsville.
- Kingsville is the site of the colonial church of which Archibald McRoberts was minister.
