= Virginia State Route 133 =

State highway in Prince Edward County, Virginia, US

State Route 133

Route information
- Maintained by VDOT
- Length: 1.19 mi (1.92 km)
- Existed: 1933–present

Major junctions
- West end: SR 692 at Hampden-Sydney
- East end: US 15 at Kingsville

Location
- Country: United States
- State: Virginia
- Counties: Prince Edward

Highway system
- Virginia Routes; Interstate; US; Primary; Secondary; Byways; History; HOT lanes
← SR 132	→ SR 134

State Route 133 (SR 133) is a primary state highway in the U.S. state of Virginia. Known as Kingsville Road, the state highway runs 1.19 miles (1.92 km) from SR 692 at Hampden-Sydney east to U.S. Route 15 (US 15) at Kingsville in central Prince Edward County. SR 133 provides access to Hampden–Sydney College.

== Route description ==
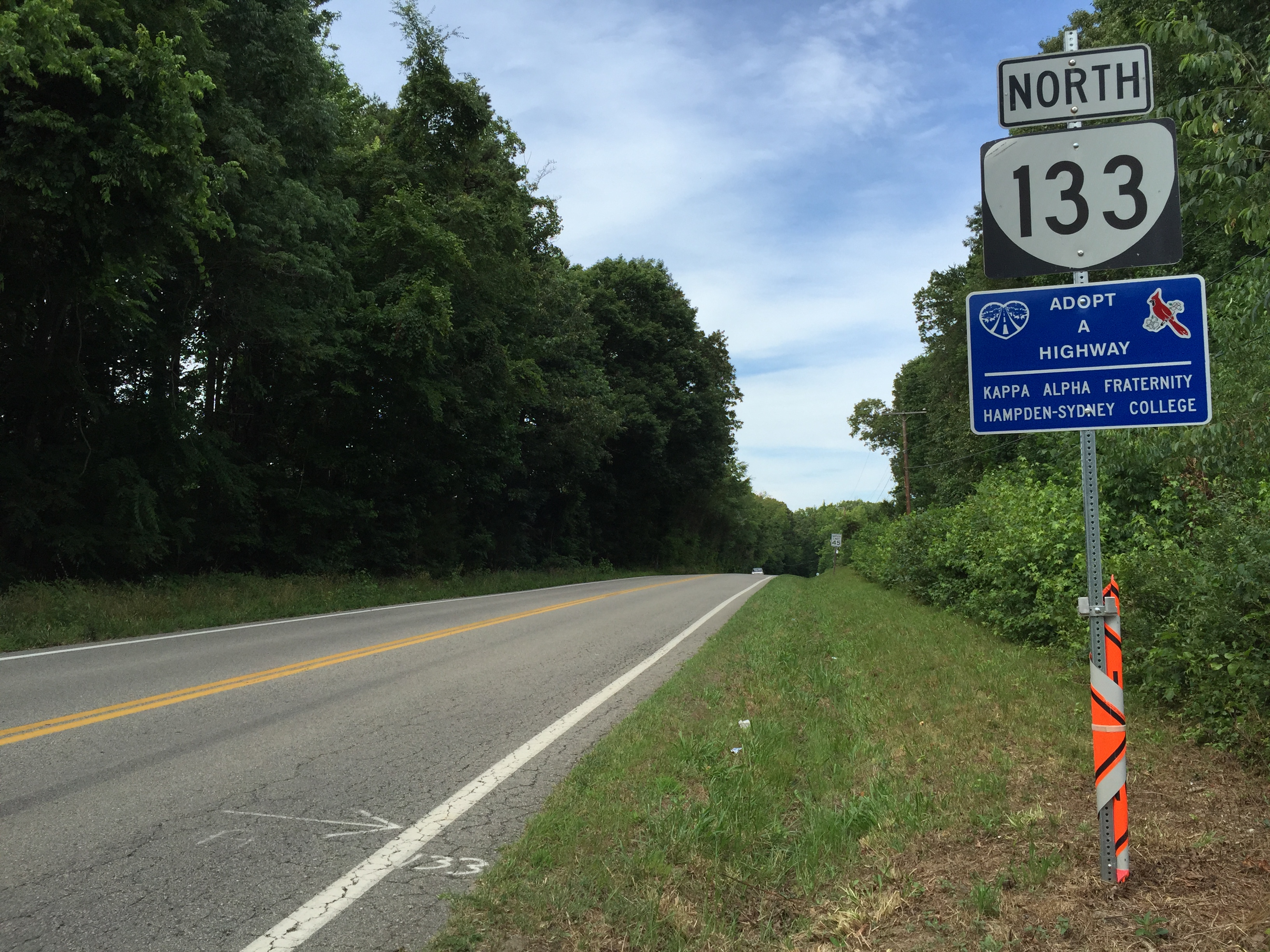
View north at the south end of SR 133 at SR 692 in Hampden-Sydney

SR 133 begins at an intersection with SR 692 (College Road) at the hamlet of Hampden-Sydney. SR 133 heads northeast through a forested area, bypassing the campus of Hampden–Sydney College, while SR 692 passes directly through the campus of the men's college. SR 133 curves east and meets the eastern end of SR 692 on a tangent before reaching its eastern terminus at US 15 (Farmville Road) at the hamlet of Kingsville south of Farmville.

== Major intersections ==
The entire route is in Prince Edward County.

Location	mi	km	Destinations	Notes
Hampden-Sydney	0.00	0.00	SR 692 (College Road) – Darlington Heights	Western terminus
			SR 692 west (College Road) – Hampden-Sydney College	former SR 133 west
Kingsville	1.19	1.92	US 15 (Farmville Road)	Eastern terminus
1.000 mi = 1.609 km; 1.000 km = 0.621 mi

< SR 304	District 3 State Routes; 1928–1933	SR 306 >
< SR 323	District 3 State Routes; 1928–1933	SR 325 >
