= Melrose (Fork Union, Virginia) =

Historic house in Virginia, United States

- U.S. National Register of Historic Places
- Virginia Landmarks Register
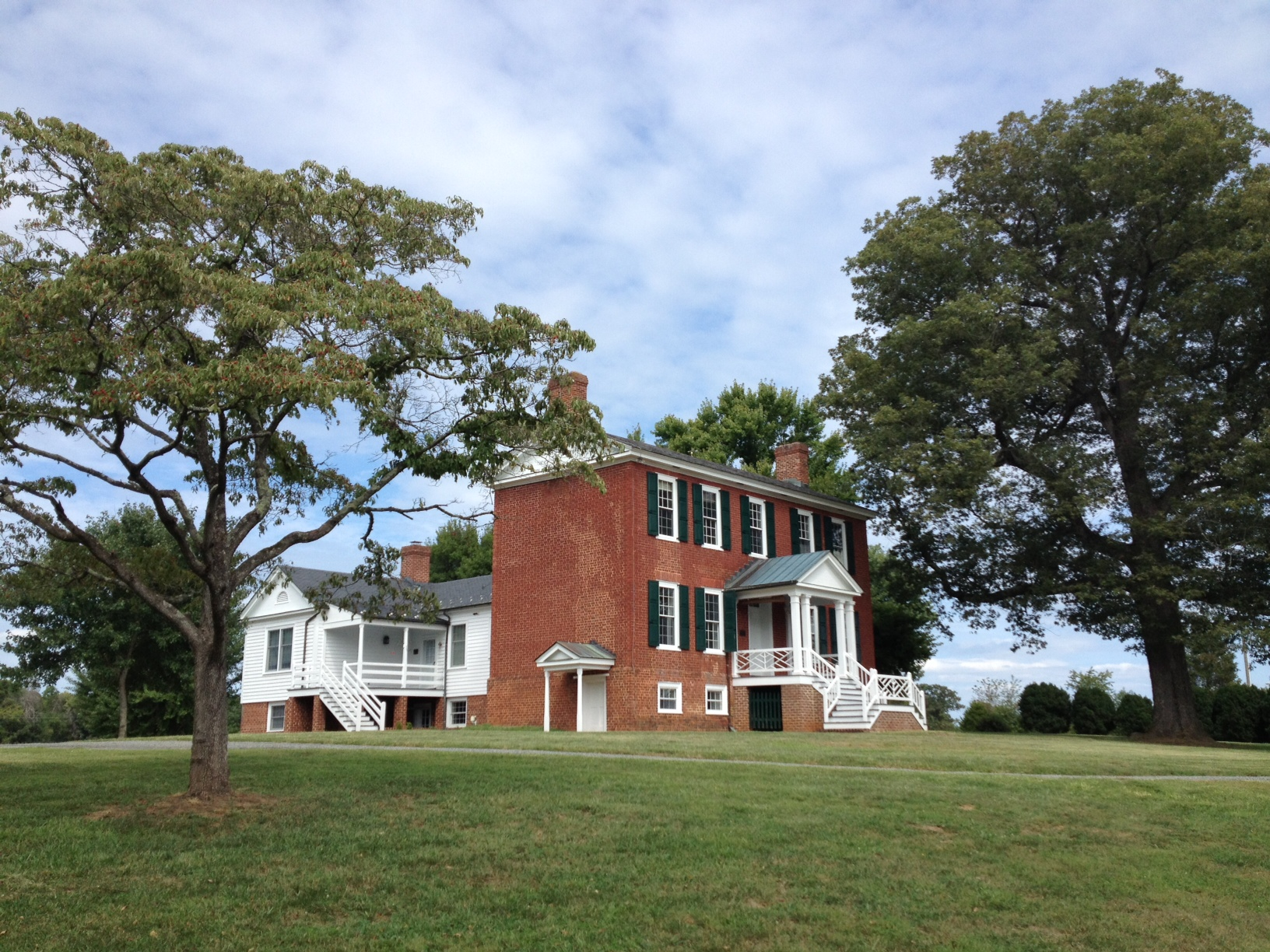

- Location within Virginia Location within the United States
- Location: VA 640, southwest of the junction of VA 640 and VA 650, near Fork Union, Virginia
- Coordinates: 37°44′19″N 78°21′42″W
- Area: 100 acres (40 ha)
- Built: 1813
- Architectural style: Federal
- NRHP reference No.: 00000892
- VLR No.: 032-0019

Significant dates
- Added to NRHP: August 14, 2000
- Designated VLR: June 14, 2000

Melrose, also known as the Ellen Miyagawa House, is a historic home located near Fork Union, Fluvanna County, Virginia. It was built in 1813, and is a two-story, five-bay, rectangular brick dwelling in the Federal style. It sits on an English basement and has a slate covered gable roof with pedimented ends. A 1 1/2-story frame addition was built in 1978.

It was listed on the National Register of Historic Places in 2000.
