= John H. Cocke Memorial Bridge =

Bridge in Virginia, United States

Coordinates: 37.7107°N 78.3023°W

The John H. Cocke Memorial Bridge is a bridge along U.S. Route 15 in the state of Virginia that crosses over the James River. Its northern terminus is at Bremo Bluff, VA and the Bremo Historic District in southern Fluvanna County and its southern terminus is at New Canton, Virginia in northern Buckingham County. The bridge is named in honor of John Hartwell Cocke, a notable Virginian whose Bremo Plantation was nearby and who once owned the property on which it was built.

The current bridge is a 10-span continuous steel plate girder bridge that is 1,735.5 feet long. It was completed in 2000 to replace an earlier bridge. The original bridge, built in 1934, was a combination beam and truss bridge 1,786 feet long with a roadway 24 feet wide.

Next to the JHC Memorial Bridge runs a deck plate girder bridge used by the privately owned Buckingham Branch Railroad to connect with the CSX Railroad line that runs along the north side of the James River. By 1885 the 17-mile Dillwyn to Bremo Bluff railroad spur had been built along with the rail bridge over the James at Big Rock. The current railroad bridge was built on the foundations of the original bridge which was washed away in 1972 by Hurricane Agnes.

== See also ==
- List of crossings of the James River (Virginia)
