= Taylorstown, Virginia =

Unincorporated community in Virginia, United States

- Unincorporated community
- Location within Northern Virginia Location within Virginia Location within the United States
- Coordinates: 39°15′15″N 77°34′29″W
- Country: United States
- State: Virginia
- County: Loudoun
- Time zone: UTC−5 (Eastern (EST))
  - Summer (DST): UTC−4 (EDT)

Taylorstown is a small community in Loudoun County, Virginia, United States, built on the banks of Catoctin Creek and the surrounding hillside, about two miles (3 km) south of the Potomac River. First settled in 1734, it holds two of the oldest standing houses in Loudoun County, "Hunting Hill" and "Foxton Cottage", directly across the Catoctin Creek from each other.

The Taylorstown Historic District, comprising the core of the village, was added to the National Register of Historic Places on January 30, 1978 and expanded in 2005.

== History ==
=== Indigenous History ===
The region known as Taylorstown was most likely part of the territory under the control of the Manahoac tribe, who probably used northern Loudoun County as a hunting territory.

=== European Colonization ===
The first resident of the Taylorstown area was Richard Brown, a devout Quaker who arrived in the 1730s from Bucks County, Pennsylvania, to establish a mill. Finding Catoctin Creek to be the ideal location, he acquired a large parcel of several hundred acres of farm and woodland which ranged from the Potomac south to Lincoln. In 1734, Brown constructed a small house that would later bear the name of Hunting Hill, and which remains the oldest standing building in Loudoun County. Richard Brown died in May 1745, and left his land divided into tracts for his wife and each of his five sons. His wife inherited the tract that contained the Taylorstown area and its buildings, and she later passed her tract to her youngest son, Mercer Brown, who sold it in 1784. The purchaser was Thomas Taylor, a wealthy Quaker from Frederick County, Maryland, who also had a strong interest in a milling operation.

While living at Hunting Hill, Taylor erected a new mill of local stone about 50 yards (46 m) north of the site of the original mill. Known today as the Taylorstown Mill, the structure was built largely by slaves from local farms, who were hired when their masters could spare them and paid wages according to the Quaker customs of the day. Today, there are many initials and names carved into the stones of the Mill—perhaps some of them were from the builders or their employers. Following the mill's completion, Taylor sold off quarter-acre lots of the land surrounding the mill. The new settlers called the area Taylor Town, which became Taylorstown around 1900. The Taylorstown Mill was continuously in operation until 1911, when its water wheel was sold to the nearby Oatlands Mill and the mill converted to steam power. In 1932, the steam engines were removed and the Mill became a feed store until Anna Hedrick bought it in the late 1950s. Since the late 1960s, Taylorstown Mill has been a private residence.

The private residence today called Whiskey Hill dates to the late 18th century.

=== Establishment as a community ===
Taylorstown was transformed from a small settlement into a thriving agricultural community over about a hundred years. The greatest catalyst for growth was farming and milling (there were at least three mills in the area) and to some extent iron mining from the local Furnace Mountain, which attracted miners during the late 18th and early 19th century. Traces of the old mining operation remain today. The furnace used to separate iron from the ore was near the Potomac River; a tunnel brought water from the Catoctin Creek to power its bellows.

During the 19th century, the Taylorstown area was one of the most densely populated areas of Loudoun County. The town had a post office, a blacksmith's shop, 2 mills (one is still standing), a U.S. Government-operated still, general and supply stores and a movie theatre. There are also records of schools, most notably the Crossroads School built in 1834, which was located near Waterford Downs until the 1940s.

=== Trouble during the Civil War ===
Many of the original residents of Taylorstown were Quakers and sympathetic to the North. Some aided Northern forces by smuggling food and supplies across the Potomac River. In retaliation, a group of Confederate soldiers attacked the locals and burned down the mill and the only bridge across Catoctin Creek.

== Proposed dam and the Catoctin Valley Defense Alliance ==
The Catoctin Valley Defense Alliance was formed in 1974 by the citizens of Taylorstown. The group became very active in response to the possibility of Catoctin Creek being dammed. The Fairfax Water Authority, the Washington, D.C. Government, and the Washington Commission proposed plans for a drought relief water supply. This plan deemed the 3,280 acres (13.3 km^{2}) of the lower Catoctin Valley "the most effective, reliable and cost effective" of a multitude of water supply alternatives considered by the engineers. A dam would be built near where Catoctin Creek empties into the Potomac, which would create a five mile (8 km)-long, 364 ft (111 m). deep "feeder lake" that could hold 14 billion US gallons (53,000,000 m^{3}) of water. All of the collected water could be released in a time of drought, which would swell the Potomac and provide emergency water as the water flowed down the river to Washington, D.C. If constructed, it would place the Taylorstown Historic District in danger of destruction.

The local community rallied behind the Catoctin Valley Defense Alliance to help stop such a "feeder lake". During this time, local vehicles displayed bright red bumper stickers which proclaimed "Don't Dam Taylorstown," which was changed to "Don’t Dam Loudoun" when it became clear that more land was going to be endangered beyond Taylorstown and its surrounding environs. Phil Erenkranz and Miss Anna Hedrick, two lawyers actively involved in the Defense Alliance, went before the Virginia General Assembly in Richmond. It became Virginia state law that one county did not have the right of "eminent domain" over another. No longer could Fairfax County and Washington, D.C. legally take water or anything else from Loudoun County without permission. Defeated legally, the engineers were no longer interested in building their dam. Compelled to protect the community from future threats, citizens sought out preservation legislation: Catoctin Creek was designated a State Scenic River, and the town center of Taylorstown was registered as a historical location under the Historical Preservation Act.

== Contemporary Taylorstown ==
Taylorstown is today a community of about four thousand people (3,216 were recorded in the 2000 census, a number that has grown significantly) who live generally within a three-mile (5 km) radius of the original town center. It is no longer considered an official township of Virginia, and has consequently been vaguely divided among the distantly neighboring towns of Leesburg, Lovettsville, Lucketts, and Waterford. This has resulted in a confusion of government services: some residents have the address of one town, the phone number of another, and the school of whichever district maintains the nearest bus route.

The population is economically diverse. Some residents are artists and do not possess working plumbing, other residents live in mansions worth tens of millions, and the rest are somewhere in between. Easy access to the MARC commuter rail has also brought in a number of residents who commute to work daily in Washington, D.C. via an hour-long train ride.

== National Register of Historic Places ==
The Taylorstown Historic District was listed on the National Register of Historic Places on January 30, 1978. The district was expanded on May 26, 2005.
