= Western View =

Historic house in Virginia, United States

- U.S. National Register of Historic Places
- Virginia Landmarks Register
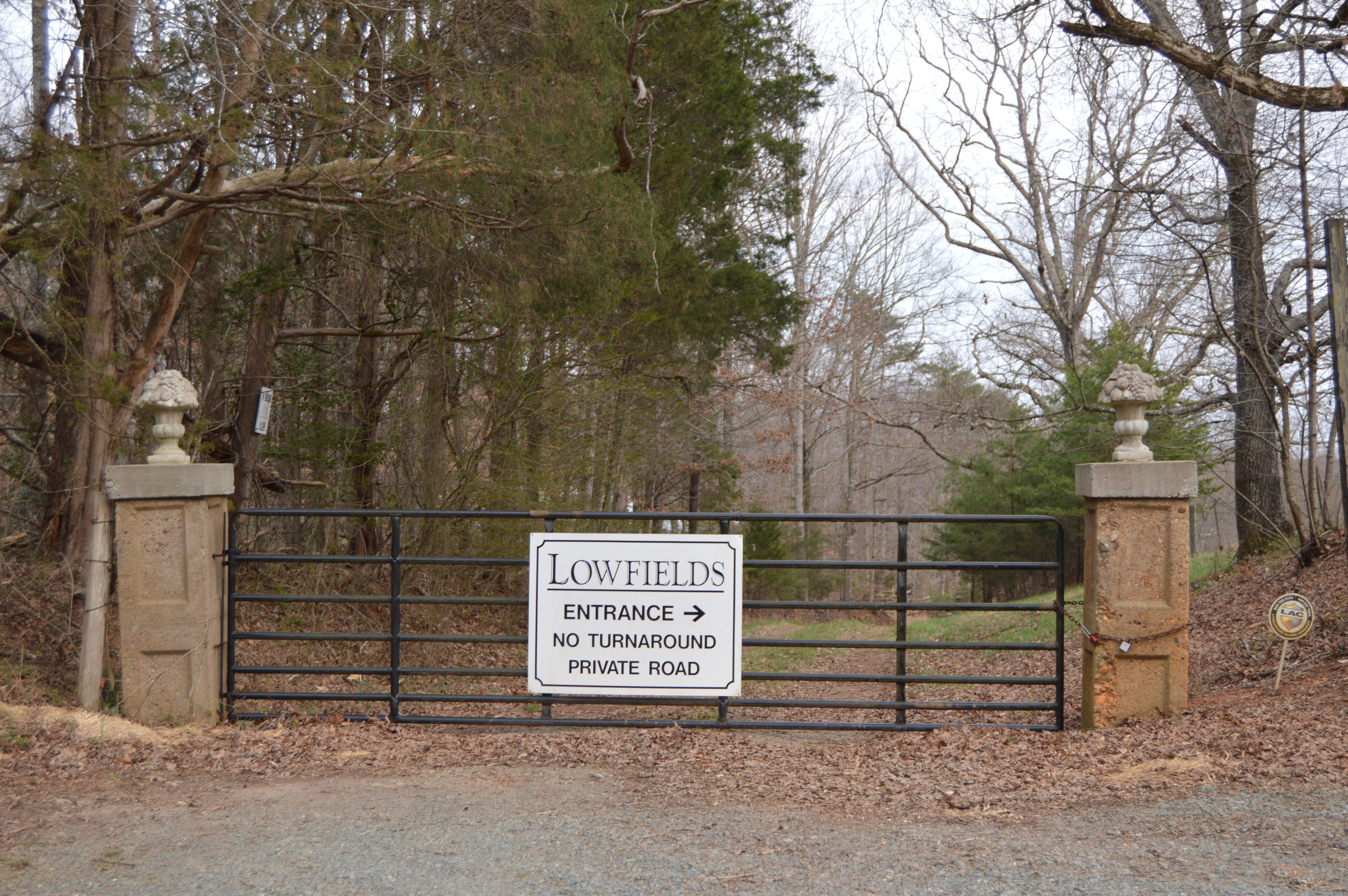
- Entrance to the property

- Location within Virginia Location within the United States
- Location: VA 658, near Fork Union, Virginia
- Coordinates: 37°44′06″N 78°21′22″W
- Area: 40 acres (16 ha)
- Built: c. 1790, 1824
- Architectural style: Greek Revival
- NRHP reference No.: 02000320
- VLR No.: 032-0114

Significant dates
- Added to NRHP: April 1, 2002
- Designated VLR: April 1, 2002

Western View is a historic home located near Fork Union, Fluvanna County, Virginia. The original frame section was built about 1790, and expanded with a brick addition in 1824. The original section is a 1 1/2-story, two-bay, rectangular frame structure with a slate covered gable roof. The brick addition is a one-over-one wing with Greek Revival attributes. Also on the property are the contributing site of the outdoor kitchen with extant chimney, and the Henley/Johnson family cemetery.

It was listed on the National Register of Historic Places in 2002.
