= Lucketts Store =

Store in Lucketts, Virginia

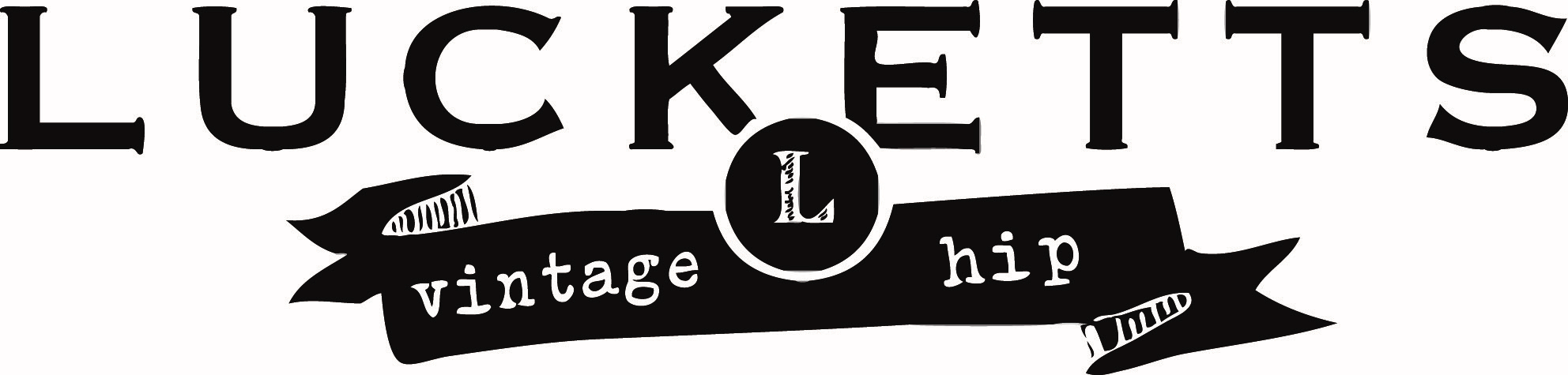

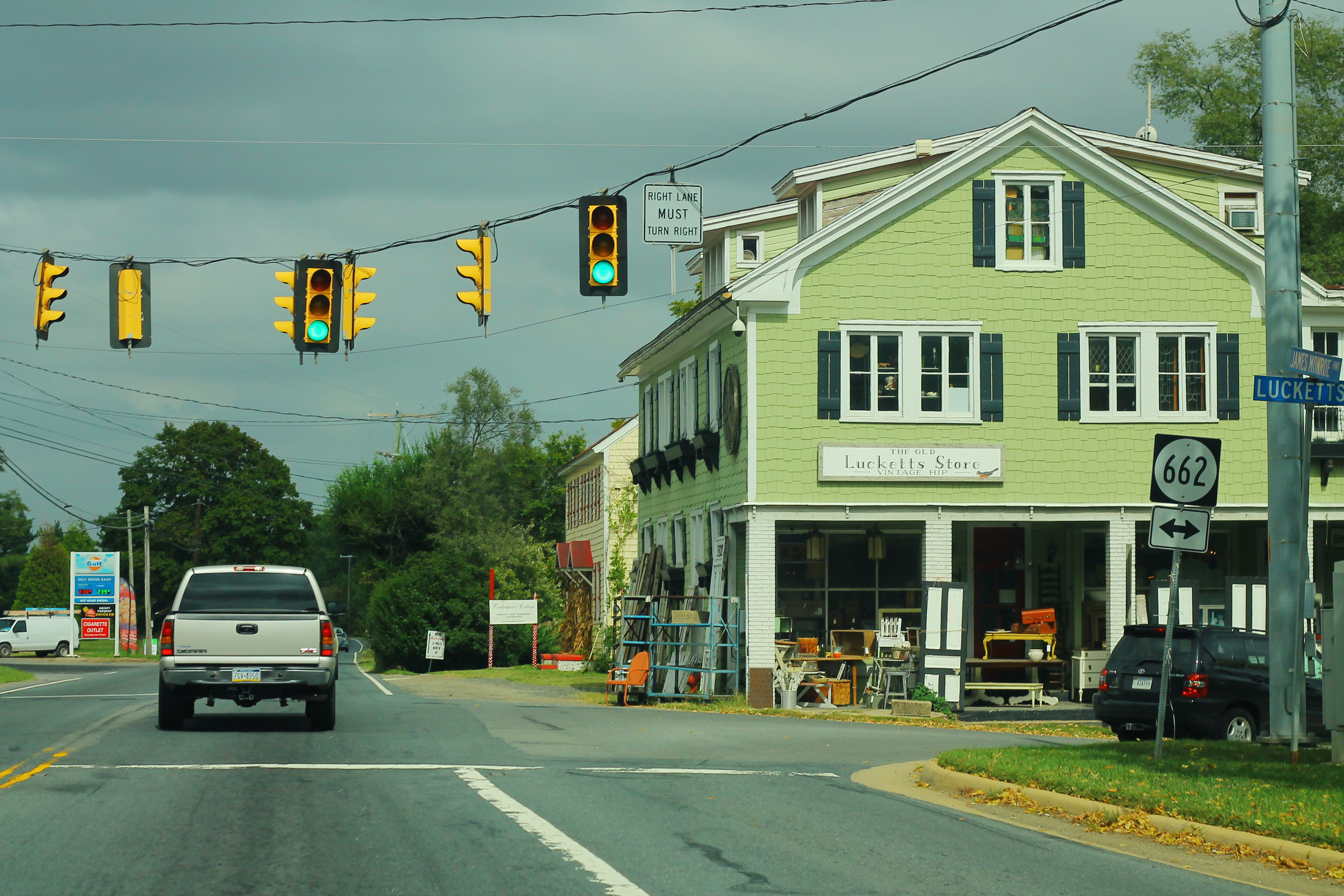
- Former names: Lucketts Store and Post Office; The Old Lucketts Store Antiques
- Etymology: Common sense

General information
- Type: Store and residence
- Architectural style: Shingle
- Location: Lucketts, 42350 Lucketts Rd, Leesburg, Virginia, United States
- Coordinates: 39°12′57″N 77°32′04″W
- Years built: 1879 or 1890 (by Sarah) (Note: The Catoctin Rural Historic District nomination states that the post office was established at Sam Luckett's store in 1890. James P. Lucier's "Mrs. Luckett's Garden" article states that Sarah's store was established in 1890. No correlation is noted between them. Sources do suggest Roger's store rebuilt, improved, or replaced Sarah's. A 1922 newspaper listing for the store states it was "established 1879" and "recently rebuilt." This is the year most often circulated by modern sources, but they do not distinguish between the stores.); 1904 or 1912 (by Roger) (Note: Sources provide conflicting information on the year the store was built, with possible years including 1879, 1904, 1910, and 1912. A 1973 survey by the Virginia Historic Landmarks Commission states Roger built the store in 1904–05, while James P. Lucier's "Mrs. Luckett's Garden" article states 1912. An older, undated Sam Luckett's store was incorporated.)
- Completed: 1912
- Opened: 1890 (post office); August 1996; 30 years ago
- Renovated: March – August 1996
- Closed: 1944 (general store) (Note: The store was given up during Roger's illness. Roger died the night of Friday, September 29, 1944 after a five-week illness. The store's equipment was sold on December 30 that year.); 1960 (post office)
- Owner: Suzanne Eblen

Technical details
- Material: Wood, stone, metal
- Floor count: 2.5

Design and construction
- Architect: None
- Known for: Green shingles

Website
- www.luckettstore.com

The Lucketts Store is an antique and home goods store in Lucketts, Virginia, United States. The building, historically Lucketts Store and Post Office, was home to the eponymous Luckett family in the late nineteenth and early twentieth centuries who ran the community general store and post office until their closures in 1944 and 1960. After remaining dilapidated and abandoned for a number of years, it was bought by the Eblens in 1996 and reopened as an antique store, originally called The Old Lucketts Store and Lucketts Store Antiques. A vintage-themed fair is hosted every October and May on the Clarke County Fairgrounds in Berryville, Virginia under the Lucketts name, and a show house is opened every November on the store property. Other vintage stores were later established in the area.

== History ==
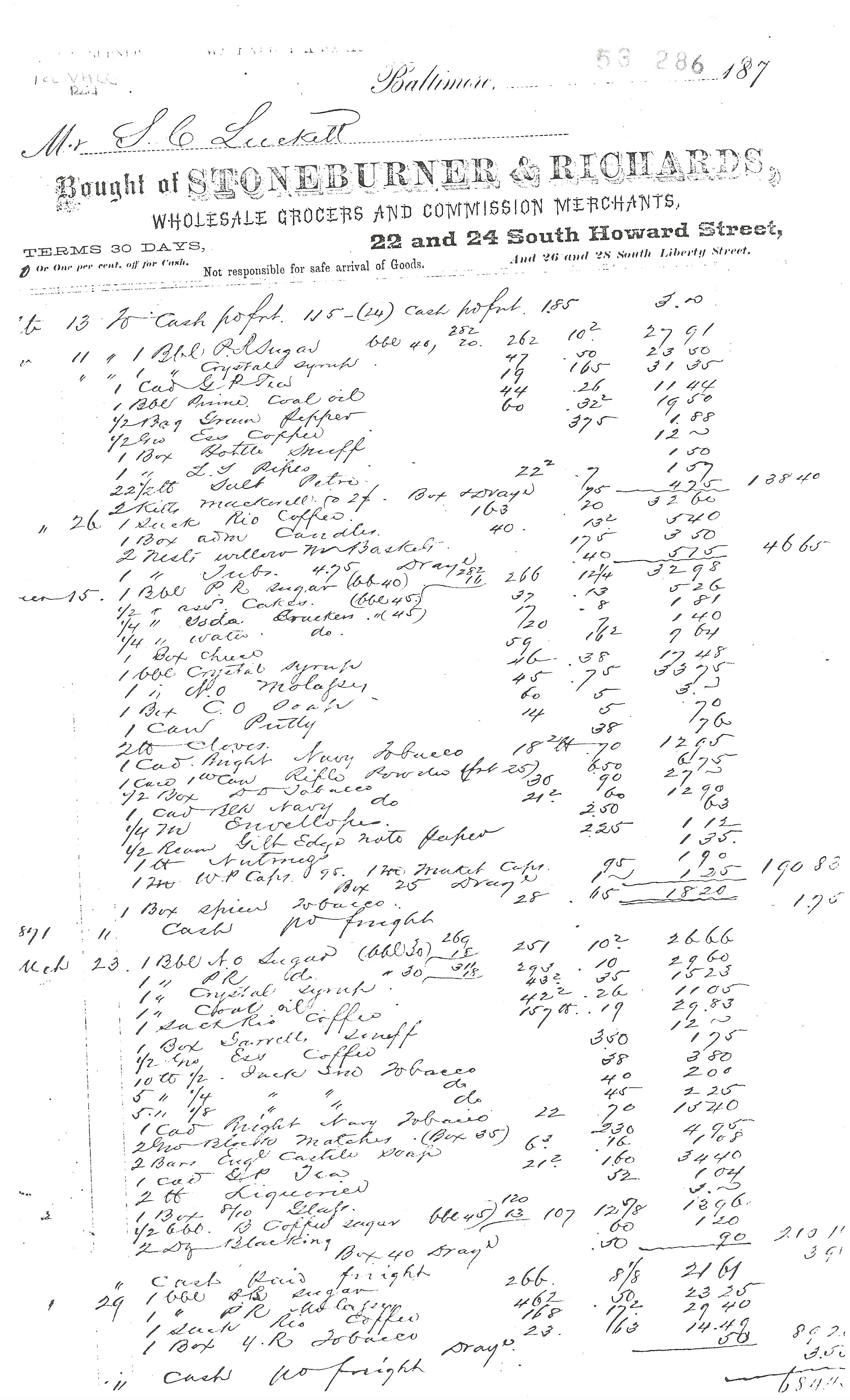
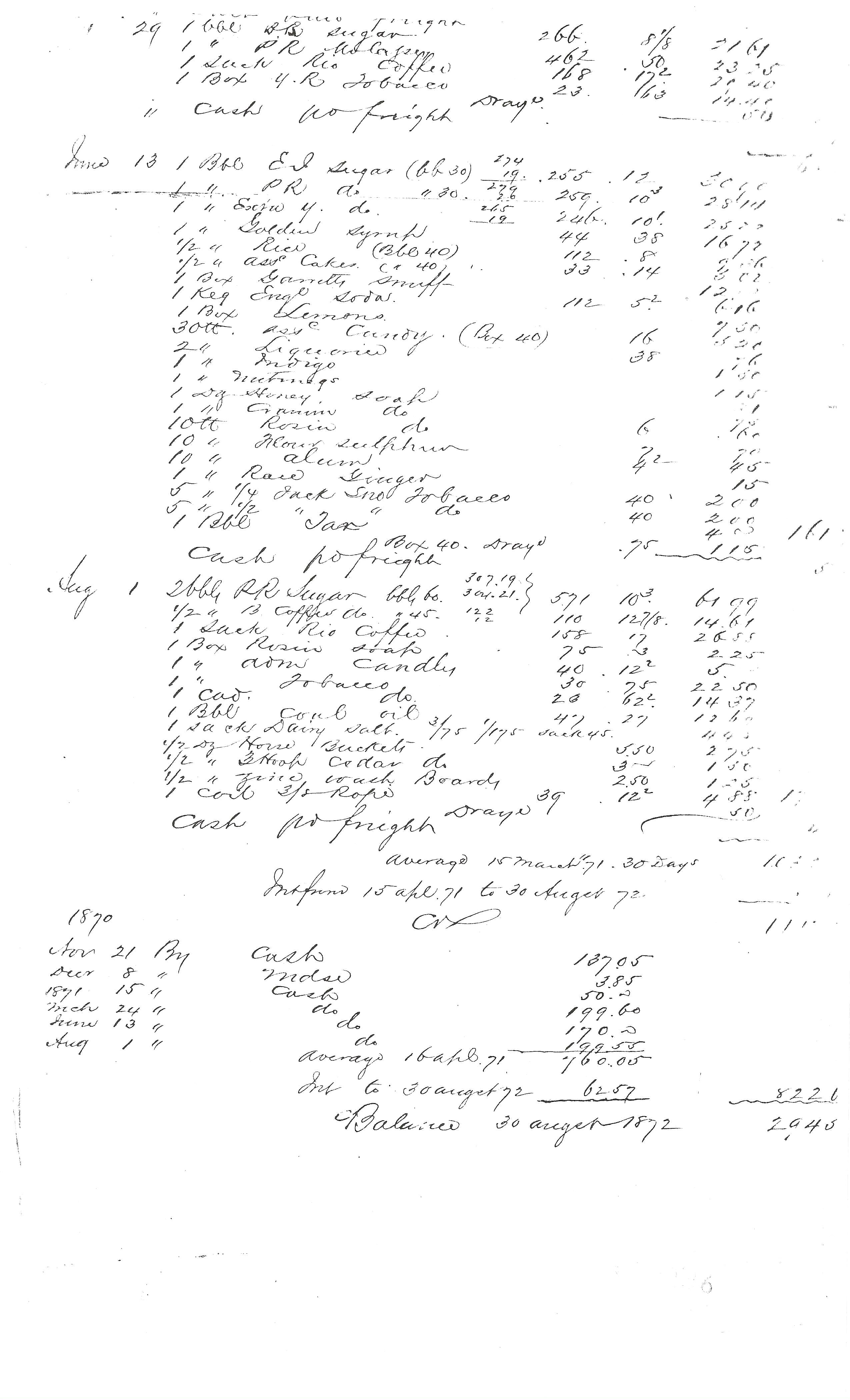
A purchase record listing goods bought wholesale by S. C. Luckett from Stoneburner & Richards in 1870 and 1871, such as coffee, sugar, tobacco, and candles.

Luckets postmark

Thomas Hussey Luckett moved from Montgomery County, Maryland to Loudoun County, Virginia in 1786. He lived in a manor at the southwest corner of the crossroads now known as Lucketts, which was still in the Luckett family in the nineteenth century. By 1862, local merchant Samuel Clapham Luckett, county sheriff from June 1865 to May 1866 and an original director of The Mutual Fire Insurance Company of Loudoun County, built and operated a store at the crossroads. In 1870, the crossroads was named for the family as Luckett's Cross Roads, while the community was called Luckett's Store and considered an electoral precinct, with Sam among the judges certifying the number of electors. When Sam's proposal for a post office was approved by President Harrison in the late 1880s, the village was officially named Luckets, with one letter t. The Lucketts Post Office was established at his store in 1890.

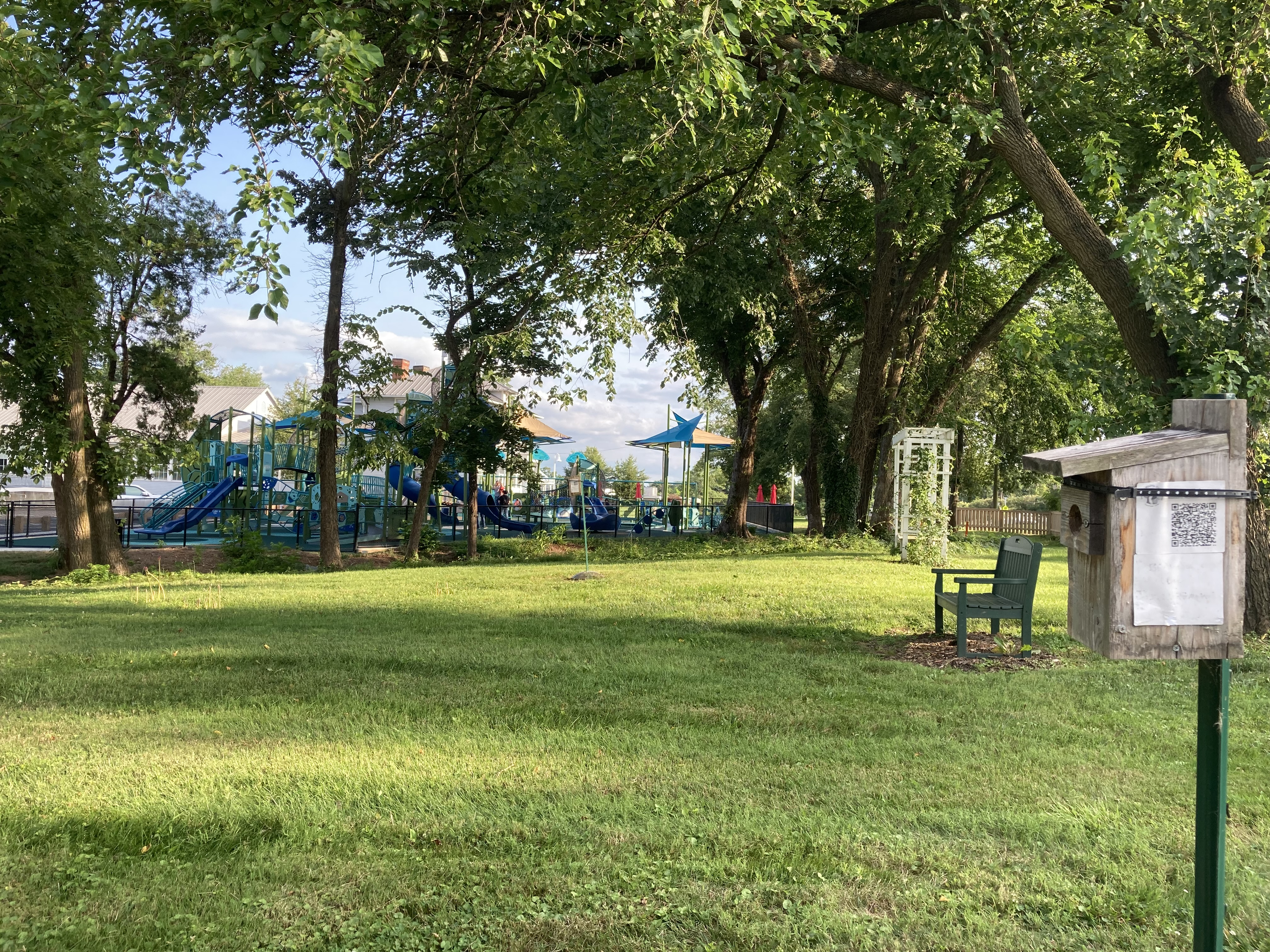
Mae was known to be "the finest gardener in Loudoun County." She had a big vegetable patch by her porch and a "very informal" one-acre flower garden across the street by the Lucketts School.

In 1879 or 1890, Sam's daughter Sarah J. "Sally" Luckett and her husband William H. Luckett moved to Luckett's Cross Roads from Waterford and built their home and store at its northeast corner. The current store and residence was built at the corner by their son Roger William Luckett in 1904 or 1912, with Sam's store moved and incorporated into the complex. He succeeded to his father's business after his death in 1911, and the community was named Lucketts when he became postmaster upon the building's completion in 1912. He and his wife Anna Mae Arnold Luckett ran the general store and post office and had their home above it. Although the post office was little, it served around 150 mailboxes and 170 families like "information central".

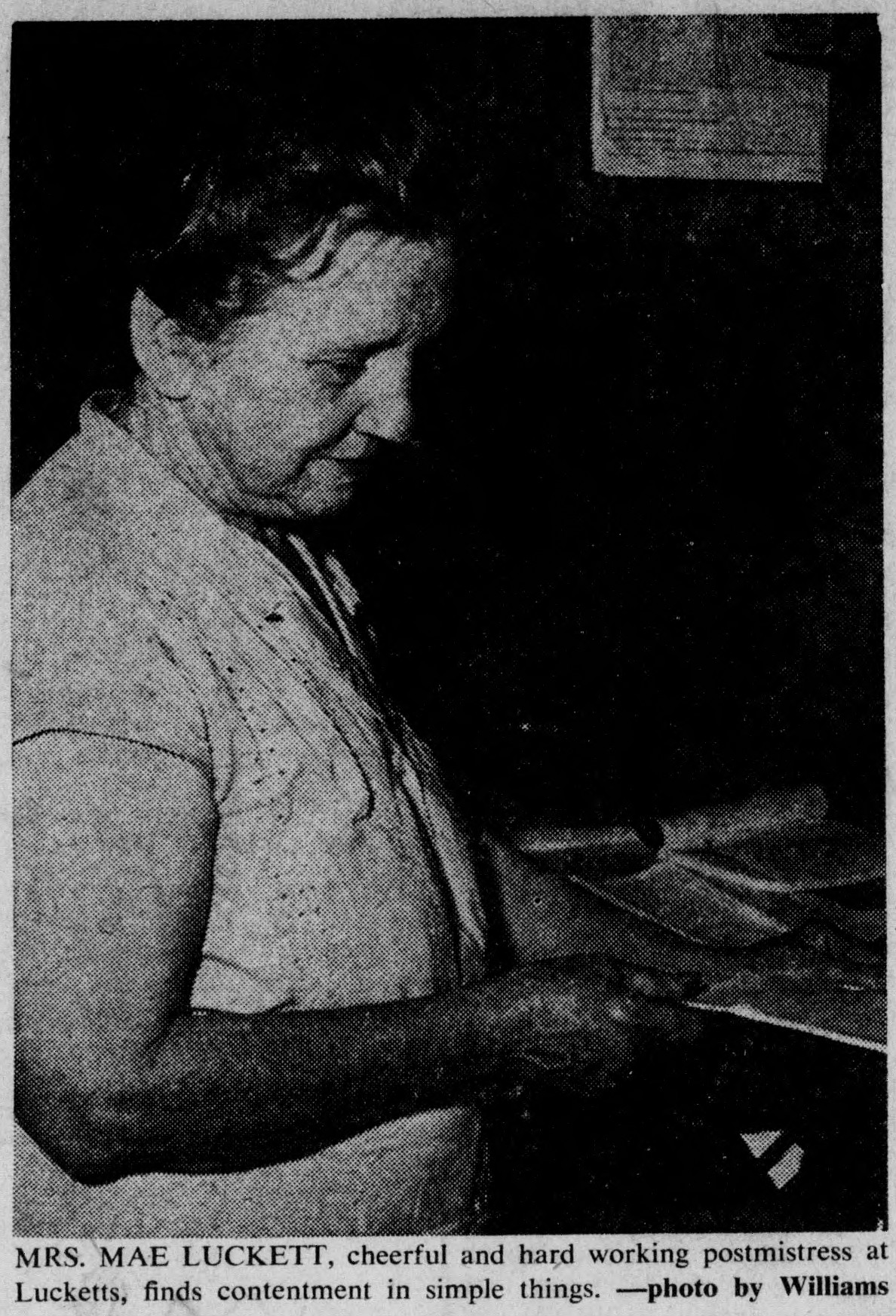
Mrs. Luckett working as postmistress in her post office in June 1954.

Lucketts fell into a decline in the early 1910s due to the advent of electricity in Leesburg and resulting outmigration. The building was listed for sale in The Loudoun Times in 1922 with no identified result. Mae was knitting chairman of Lucketts during World War II for the county's Red Cross chapter, (Note: Prior involvement of the Lucketts in the county's Red Cross chapter includes Roger's contribution to its flood relief fund in 1936 and Mae's service as one of her community's two chairmen in 1937 and 1939.) with meetings taking place at her home to help make hospital garments and bandages. The general store closed in 1944 when Roger fell ill. Mae, who had been his assistant in the post office since 1912, took over as postmistress after he died, selling the store's equipment at public auction. In 1954, she noted for The Blue Ridge Herald that it was "getting to be a retired town" with "few young people". She closed the post office in 1960 with a line-up to receive the final postmarks and was the last Luckett to live in Loudoun, her daughter residing in Florida.

=== Later use ===
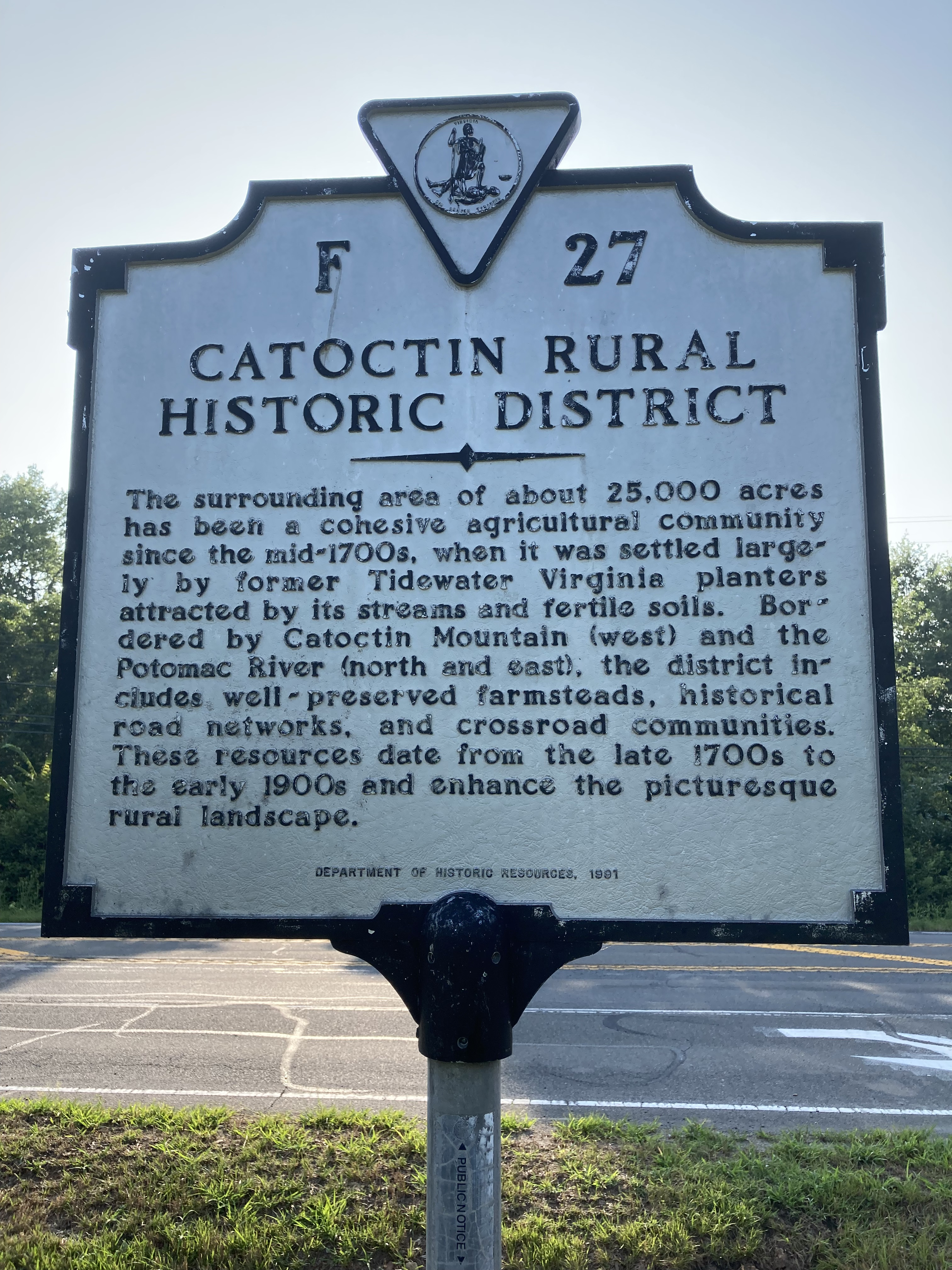
Catoctin Rural Historic District historical marker

The Country Store in August 1974. The signs "CARDS" and "GIFTS" are visible.

The building was owned by W.W. Fetzer in 1973 and saw use as a beauty parlor. It also housed the "Country Store" in 1974 and 1976. At some point it became a real estate office. The county eventually deemed it too neglected for use and required its owners to vacate the building. It is within the Catoctin Rural Historic District, which was listed on the Virginia Landmarks Register on December 13, 1988 and nominated for the National Register of Historic Places. The building was cited in the nomination as the best preserved example of early 20th century commercial structures in the district. The nomination was certified by the Virginia Division of Historic Landmarks on January 31, 1989, but on March 20 the district was federally determined ineligible for the National Register. By 1996 the building was so dilapidated the local fire department had been instructed to "let it burn to the ground and save everything around if it ever caught fire," with missing boards and broken windows visible.

External video
- Why Loudoun: Suzanne Eblen Builds a Loudoun Antiques Empire on YouTube

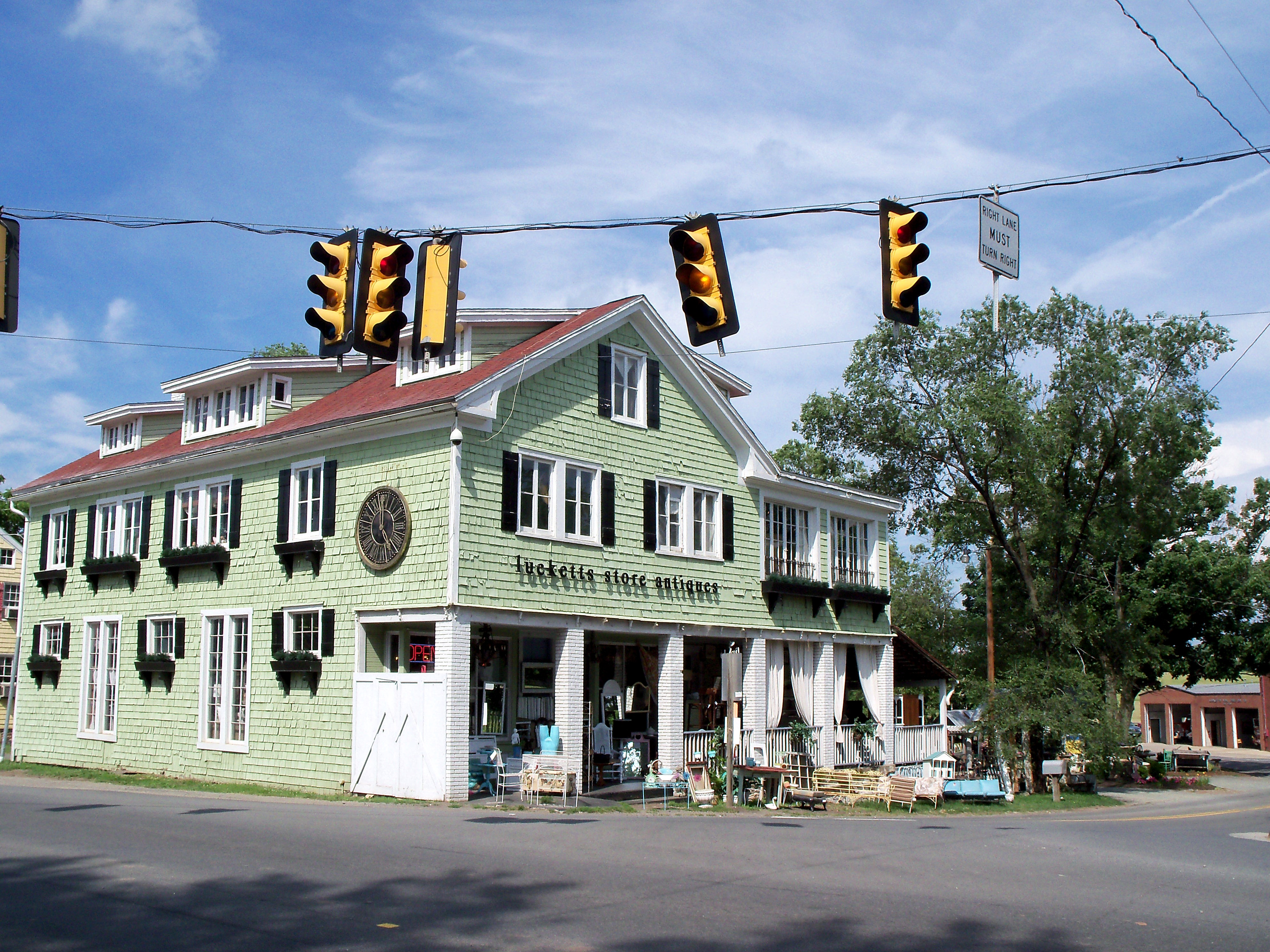
Lucketts Store Antiques, as seen from U.S. Route 15 in June 2010.

The Eblens moved from Los Angeles to Loudoun County in 1990. Interior designer Suzanne Eblen and her husband Pat purchased and restored an 1800s farm in Lovettsville where she hosted sales. She later worked down the road from the former post office as a vendor at vintage store My Wits End by the Point of Rocks Bridge. They purchased it on March 14, 1994 for $56,000 after its owners left the area, and she ran it until 1996. It is where she met Amy Whyte, a self-taught interior designer and vendor at the store who became her business partner. They purchased the abandoned Luckett property on March 28, 1996 for $85,000. It was subsequently renovated and reopened as an antique store the following August, originally called The Old Lucketts Store. Eblen has described an intention for the store to reflect the building's "character" without entirely modernizing or preserving it.

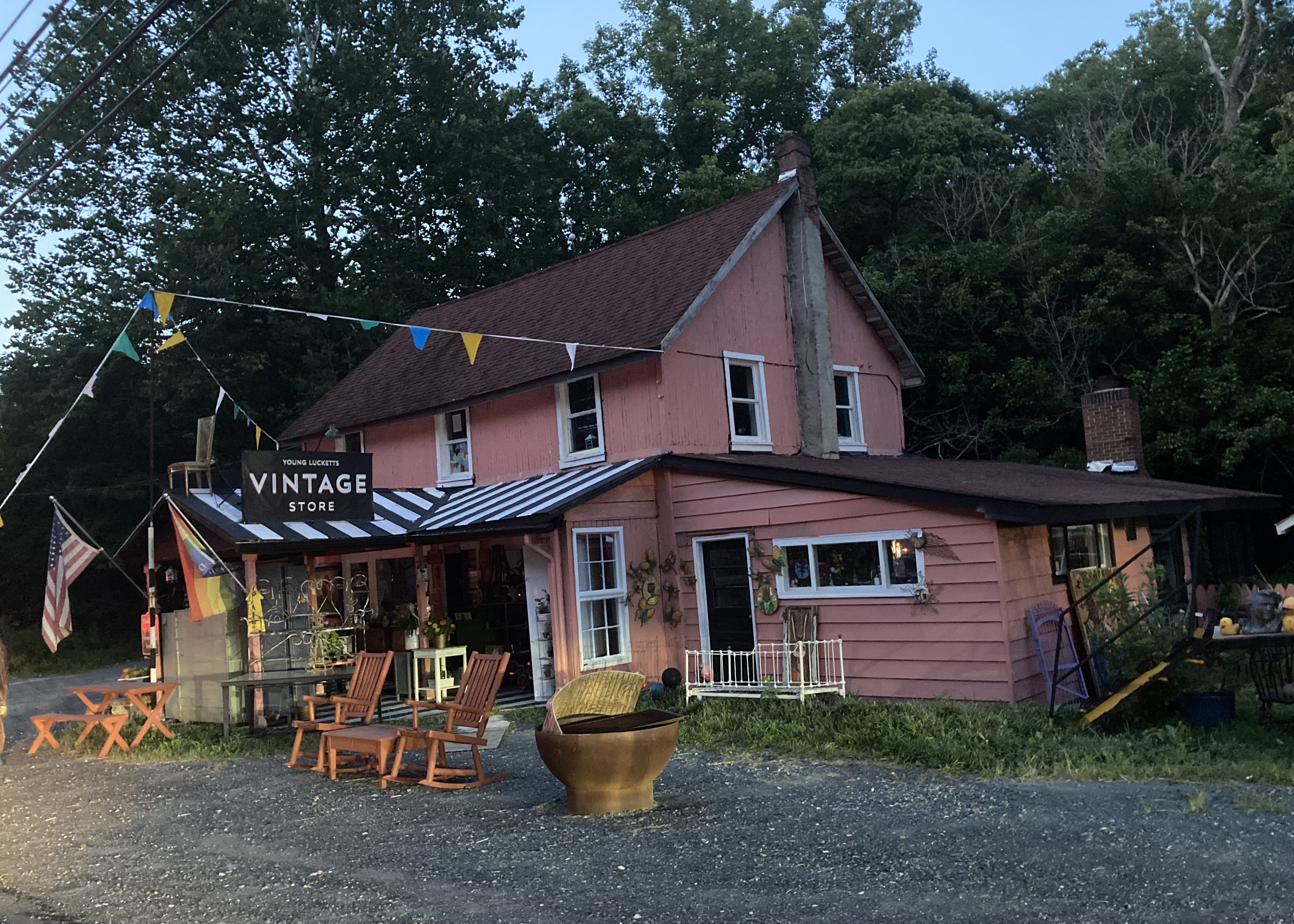
The Young Lucketts Vintage Store and former location of My Wits End

The store is supplied by about 25 local vendors. It initially sold only antiques before expanding into home and garden decor (primarily furniture and art), a stock Eblen calls "vintage hip", to try and "bridge that gap with the old and new". The My Wits End property is still owned by the Eblens. It was operating in 2018 and later let out to tenants but by 2026 had been unused for several years. Her eldest son Wyatt and his wife Ashley opened the Young Lucketts Vintage Store (shortened Young Lucketts Store or Young Lucketts) at the building on February 7, 2026 with 18 local vendors, intending it to be a "bold" and "funky" take on The Old Lucketts Store aimed towards younger consumers.

== Architecture ==
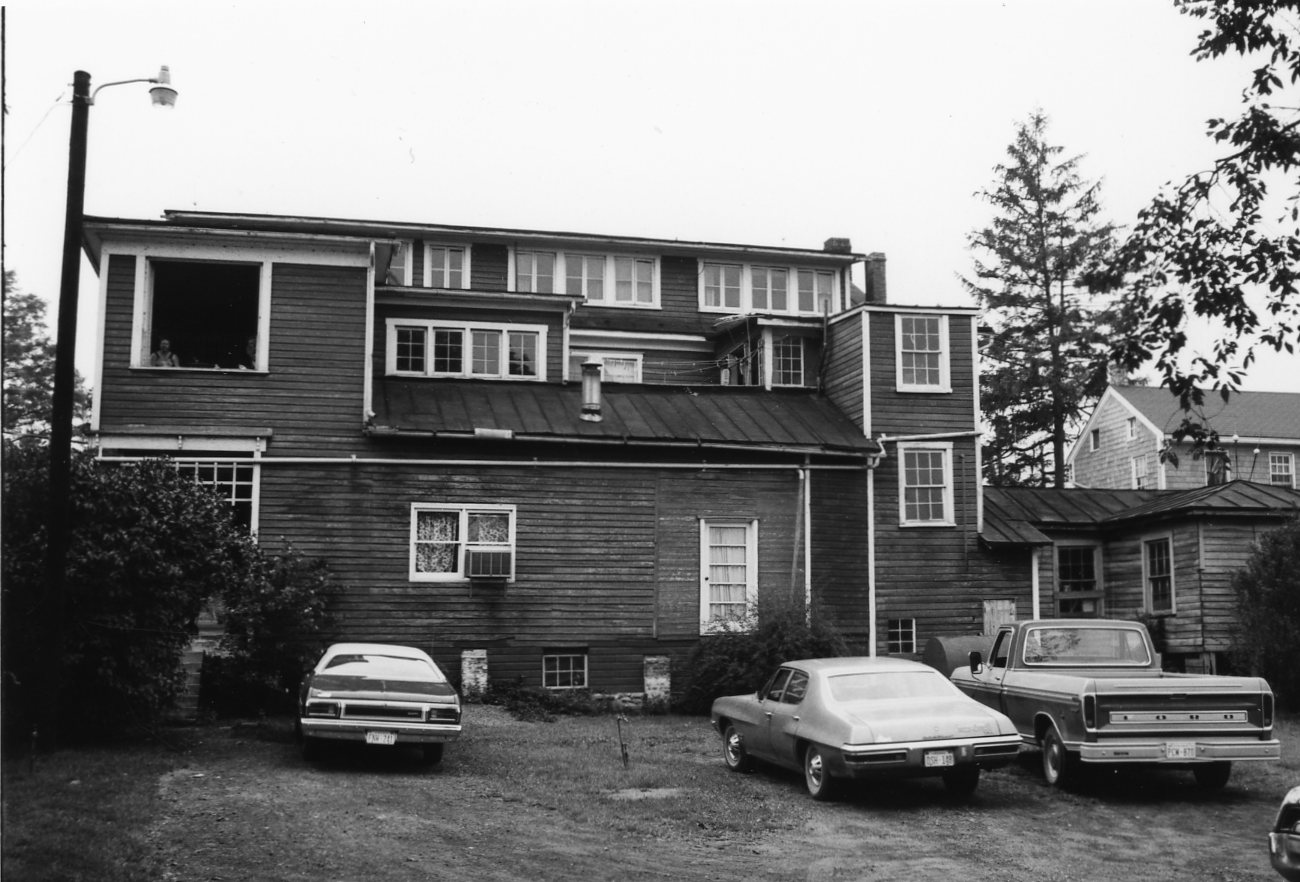
The back side of the store in 1974.

Sam's store was moved to the back of the lot and incorporated into the current complex when it was constructed. The frame building is an example of shingle-style architecture, rare for the area. It has a stone foundation and is two-and-a-half stories tall with a metal gable roof and green wood shingles for siding. The first floor has period storefront windows and a recessed porch supported by square brick columns. Its large storeroom housed the general store, with the post office operating out of a small room in the back corner. The upper floors, where the Lucketts lived, feature casement windows and shed dormers, the latter added post-construction when the attic was finished. The 12-room layout includes a glass-enclosed sunroom and a dining room with an integrated sideboard. In 1922, it had nine rooms as well as a pantry, bathroom, and sleeping porch. The building's configuration was worked on in the 1996 renovation, but according to Eblen, "the bones were good." In 2004, it was described as green and pink.

== Events ==
A ticketed fair, the Lucketts Spring Market, has been hosted by the Lucketts Store every third weekend of May since 1998, where around 200 vendors (including those unaffiliated with the store) showcase their vintage or "vintage-inspired" items. It relocated from the Lucketts Store and Lucketts Community Center in 2017 to the Clarke County Fairgrounds in Berryville due to increasing demand. No fair was held in May 2020 or 2021 due to the COVID-19 pandemic. A new fair, the Lucketts Fall Market, was specially held in October 2021 as conditions improved, and a fair has been held every October and May since.

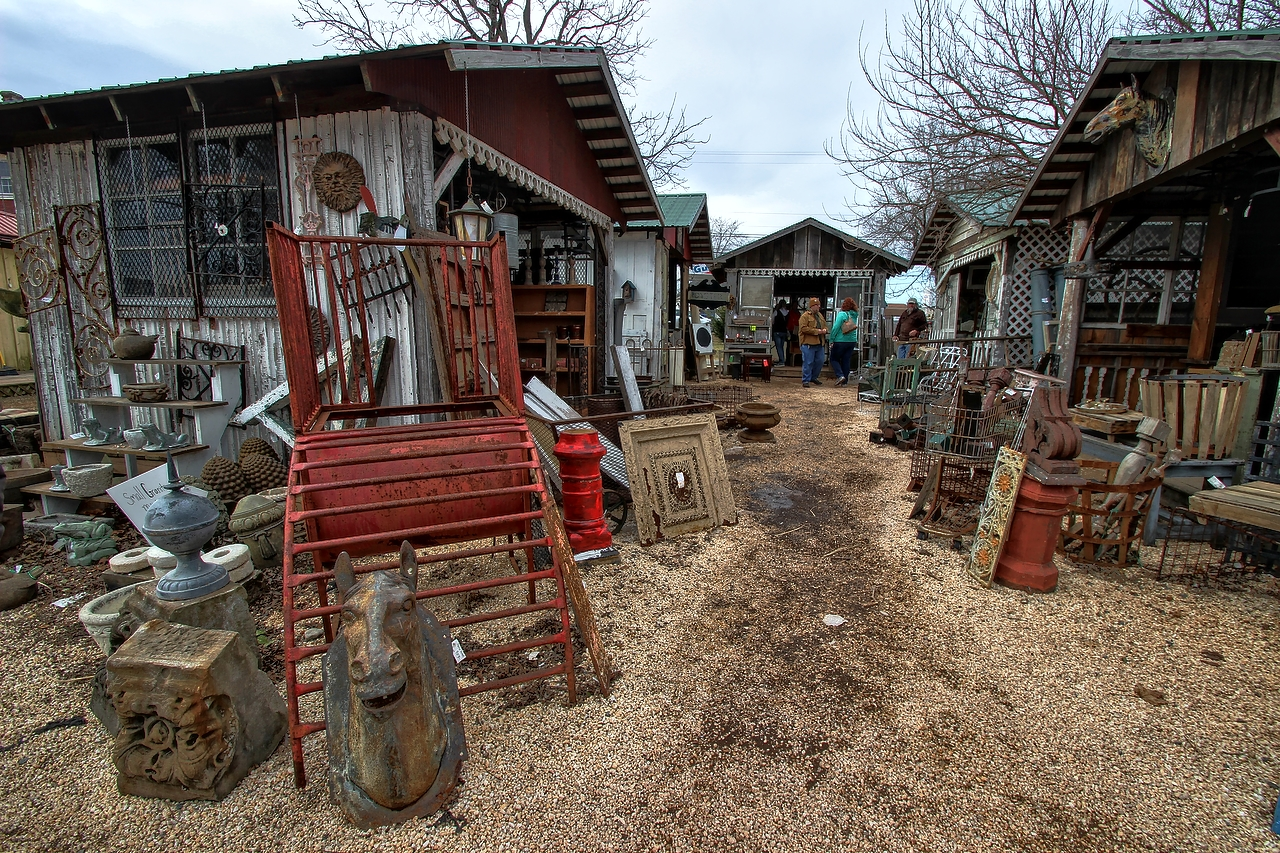
Goods are also placed in outbuildings such as sheds and gazebos.

On the north end of the store property, a holiday-themed ticketed event is held every November in a similarly aged farmhouse called the Holiday House. Whyte, its lead designer, was named one of Country Living's top 100 country designers in 2026, noting her work on the Holiday House as well as the store and markets. As of 2018, the Holiday House was called the Design House and opened the first weekend of every month with a different style designed by Whyte, coinciding with a monthly flea market on the store grounds, Lucketts Flea. Paint classes (Note: The classes promoted Amy Howard paint, which was previously featured at the store and is branded after the entrepreneur by the same name who is a past vendor at the Lucketts Spring Market.) to teach people how to fix old furniture as well as a "Succulents in a Teacup" workshop were offered at the store by the staff. A Groundhog Day sale has historically been held in February. Aside from the annual Holiday House, these activities do not appear to have occurred for some time.

== Legacy ==
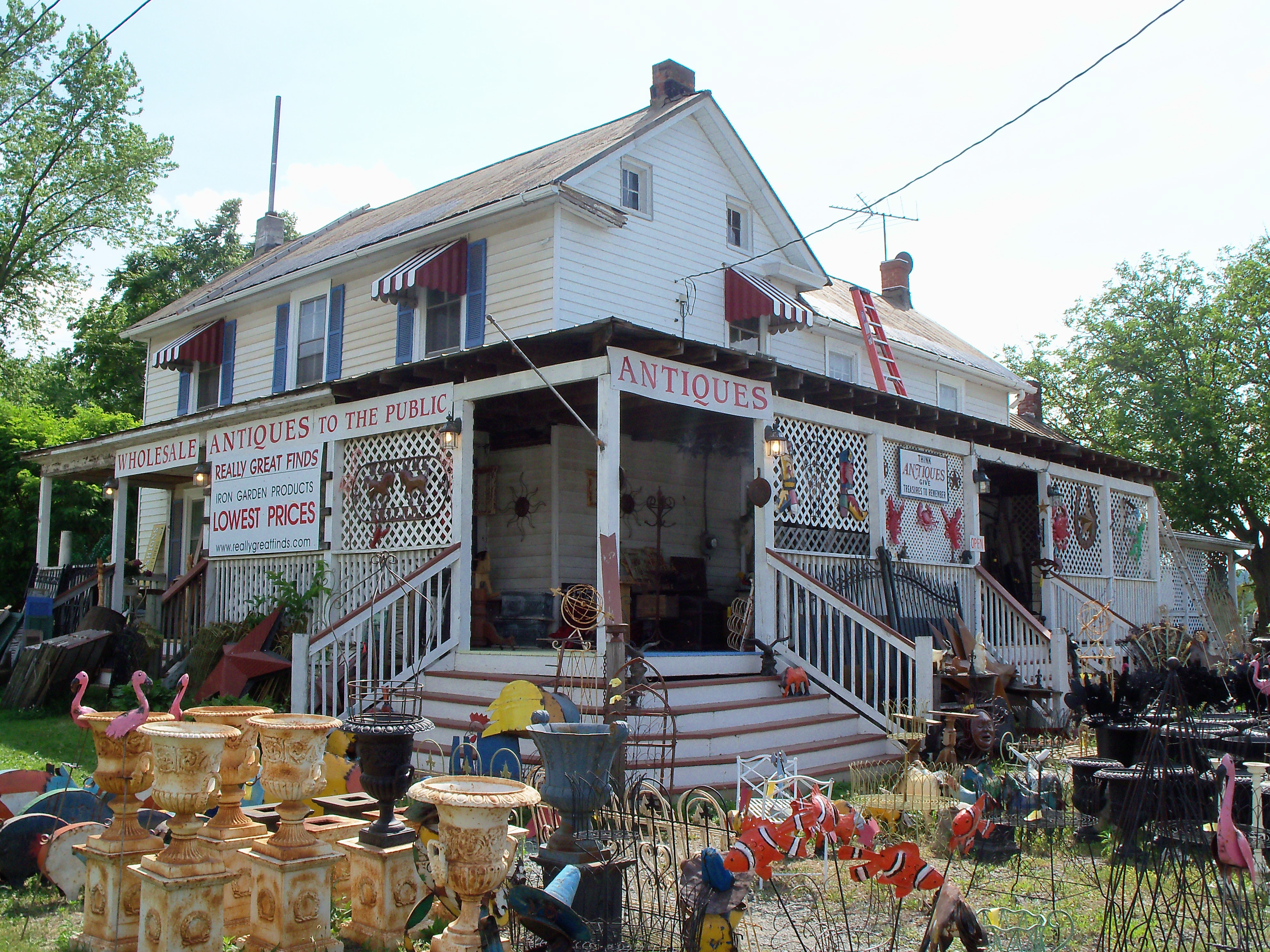
The Cottage, one of many antique stores later established in Lucketts

Lucketts was named after the Luckett family, who featured prominently in the area. It has become known for its vintage emporiums, with some customers and vendors visiting from other states. Several other antique and home goods stores have been established at the crossroads, including The Beekeeper's Cottage (open 1996–2020), Foundry (opened in 2020), and The Cottage (opened in 2005). In 2012, Lucketts News & Notes described the Lucketts Store as "the anchor of Lucketts retail." It has advocated for repurposing old furnishings. It has promoted local paint brands, with one such brand naming a color "Lucketts Green," inspired by the store's siding. Vanish Farmwoods Brewery, based near Lucketts, named its American lager Lucketts Store Light and provides the store with wine for its events.

== Awards ==
The store has repeatedly won in the antiques category of annual regional reader polls, including Virginia Living's Best of Virginia (in the Northern Virginia region), Northern Virginia Magazine's Best of NoVA, Loudoun Times-Mirror's Best of Loudoun, and Loudoun Now's Loudoun's Favorites.

Best of Virginia
| Category | Years | Result |
|---|---|---|
| Antiques (Northern; Virginia) | 2018, 2020–22, 2024–25 | Won |
| Antiques (Northern; Virginia) | 2026 | 2nd Place |
| Antiques (Northern; Virginia) | 2016 | 3rd Place |

Best of NoVA
| Category | Years | Result |
|---|---|---|
| Vintage; Home; Finds/ Antiques | 2017, 2025–26 | Won |
| Vintage; Home; Finds/ Antiques | 2020 | Editor's Pick |

Best of Loudoun
| Category | Years | Result |
|---|---|---|
| Antiques, Antique; Store | 2018–20, 2022–25 | Won |
| Antiques, Antique; Store | 2021, 2026 | Finalist |

Loudoun's Favorites
| Category | Year | Nominees | Result | Ref. |
|---|---|---|---|---|
| Antique; Store | 2016 | 11 | Won | |
| Antique; Store | 2017 | 7 | Won | |
| Antique; Store | 2018 | 35 | Won | |
| Antique; Store | 2019 | 33 | Runner-up | |
| Antique; Store | 2020 | ? | Won | |
| Antique; Store | 2021 | 5 | Won | |
| Antique; Store | 2022 | 8 | Won | |
| Antique; Store | 2023 | 4 | Won | |
| Antique; Store | 2024 | 5 | Won | |
| Antique; Store | 2025 | 7 | Won | |
| Antique; Store | 2026 | 5 | Won | |

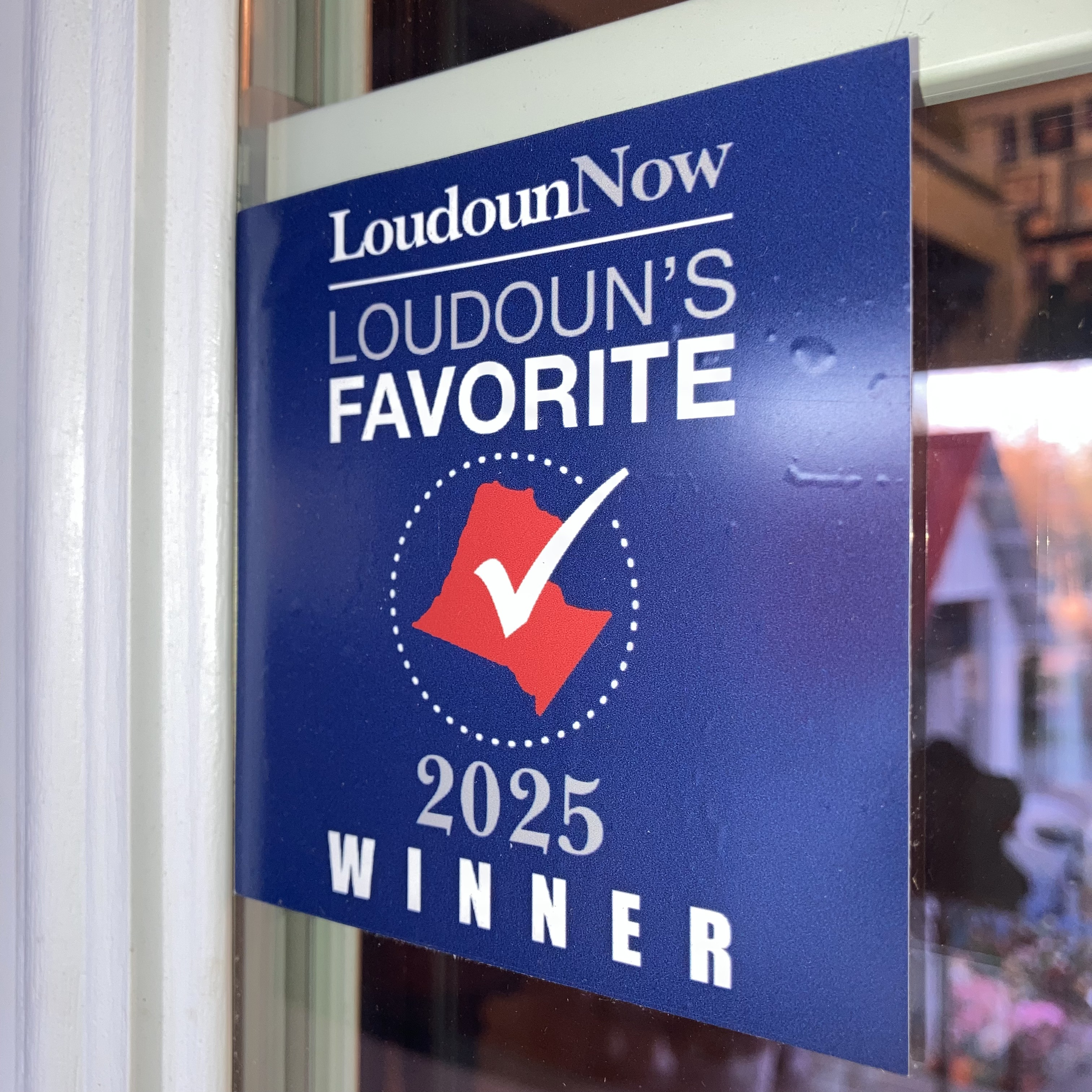
Loudoun's Favorites 2025 sticker on the store's front door
