= Dixie, Fluvanna County, Virginia =

Unincorporated community in Virginia, United States

Coordinates: 37°46′54″N 78°14′8″W

Dixie is an unincorporated community in Fluvanna County, in the Commonwealth of Virginia. Dixie is located at the eastern intersection of U.S. 15 and State Rt. 6.
