= Weber City, Fluvanna County, Virginia =

Unincorporated community in Virginia, United States

Coordinates: 37°45′19″N 78°17′02″W

Weber City, Fluvanna County is an unincorporated community in Fluvanna County, in the U.S. state of Virginia. It should not be confused with the incorporated town of Weber City in Scott County, Virginia.
