= Wildwood, Fluvanna County, Virginia =

Unincorporated community in Virginia, United States

Coordinates: 37°54′12″N 78°15′25″W

Wildwood, Fluvanna County is an unincorporated community in Fluvanna County, in the U.S. state of Virginia.
