= Taylorstown Historic District (Taylorstown, Virginia) =

Historic district in Virginia, United States

- U.S. National Register of Historic Places
- U.S. Historic district
- Virginia Landmarks Register
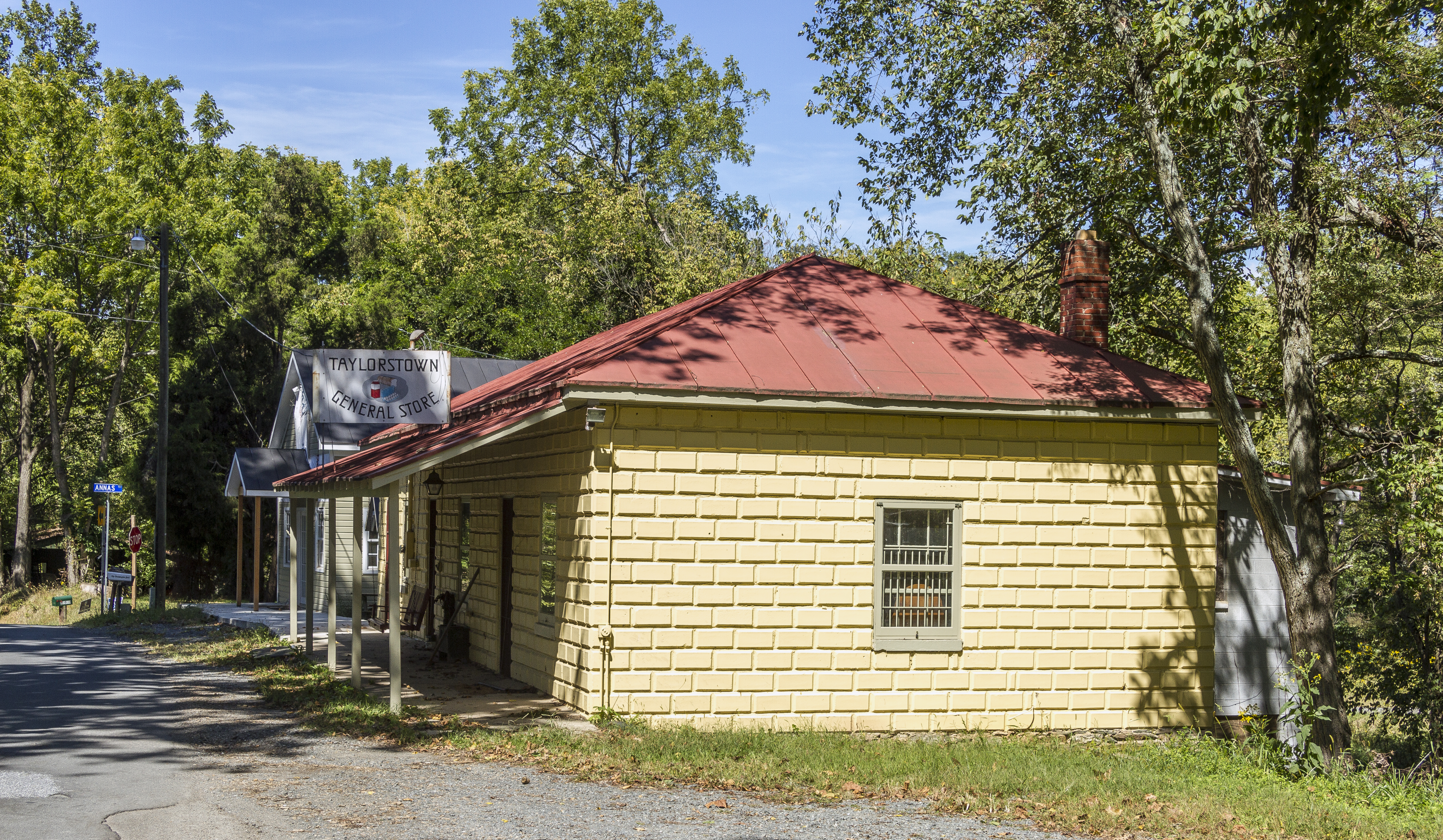
- The center of Taylorstown, with Mann's Store, now the Taylorstown Store

- Location within Northern Virginia Location within Virginia Location within the United States
- Location: Around jct. of Rtes. 633 and 688 at Catoctin Creek, Taylorstown, Virginia
- Coordinates: 39°15′15″N 77°34′29″W
- Area: 61 acres (25 ha)
- NRHP reference No.: 78003027, boundary increase 05000474
- VLR No.: 053-0603

Significant dates
- Added to NRHP: January 30, 1978, boundary increase May 26, 2005
- Designated VLR: December 21, 1976; March 16, 2005

The Taylorstown Historic District comprises the historic core of Taylorstown, Virginia. The community and the historic district are centered on the Taylorstown Mill, a two-story stone structure on the banks of Catoctin Creek. Up the hill from the mill is Hunting Hill, a house built in 1737 for the mill's owner. The district also includes a store built in 1800, adjoined by the 1904 Mann's Store, with the 1900 Mann house across the street.

The town center was listed on the National Register of Historic Places on January 30, 1978. The district was expanded on May 26, 2005.
