= Lucketts, Virginia =

Unincorporated community in Virginia, United States

- Unincorporated community
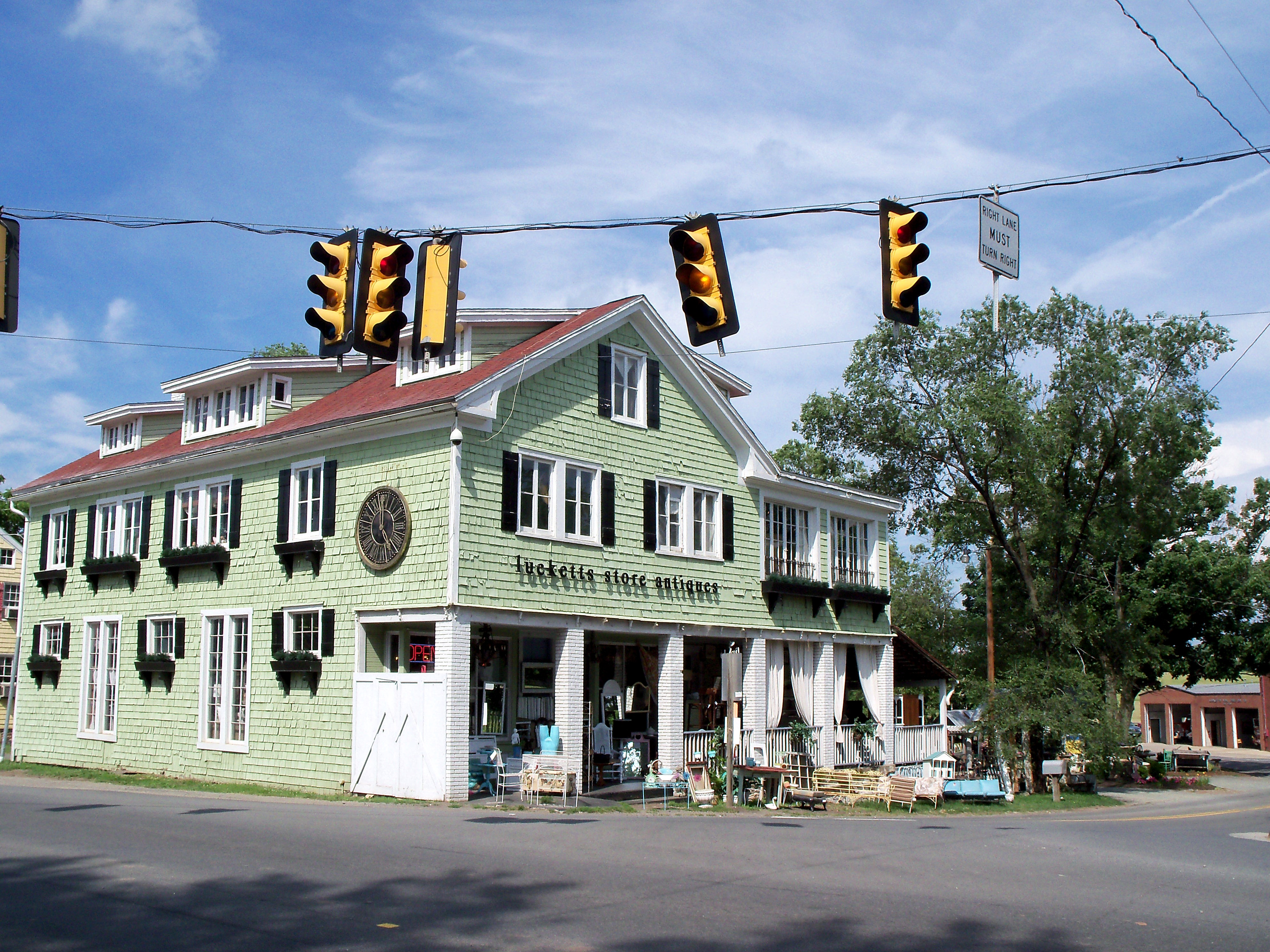
- Shops in Lucketts

- Location within Northern Virginia Location within Virginia Location within the United States
- Coordinates: 39°12′56″N 77°32′4″W
- Country: United States
- State: Virginia
- County: Loudoun
- Time zone: UTC−5 (Eastern (EST))
  - Summer (DST): UTC−4 (EDT)

Lucketts is an unincorporated historic hamlet in Loudoun County, Virginia, United States, along U.S. Route 15, north of Leesburg. It was originally known as "Black Swamp" due to the large number of black oak trees growing in the area at the time of its settlement. From the late 18th century until the mid-19th century, it was known as "Goresville" after the name of prominent local landowner, Thomas Gore. The name was finally changed to "Lucketts" in 1865. The town's Lucketts School is listed on the National Register of Historic Places.

Lucketts is approximately 7 miles (11 km) north of Leesburg, 18 miles (29 km) south of Frederick, Maryland and 48 miles (77 km) from downtown Washington, D.C.. The Potomac River is between Lucketts and Frederick, approximately 4 miles (6 km) north on Route 15. The MARC commuter train makes frequent stops on the Maryland side in nearby Point of Rocks. Train whistles of the freight trains at night and dawn are frequently heard throughout Lucketts. Also, Washington Dulles Airport (IAD) is located 23 miles (37 km) to the south, with some of the airport's major approach and departure paths directly above.

The village of Lucketts is visually cued by the traffic light at the intersection of Route 15, Lucketts Road, and Stumptown Road. Located there are antique stores, a gas station, a few residential homes and trailer parks, fire house, Lucketts Elementary School, and a cell phone tower. The Lucketts School, now the Lucketts Community Center, is listed on the National Register of Historic Places. Traffic going through Lucketts on Route 15 was approximately 18,000 to 21,000 vehicles per day as of 2005.

Lucketts is known for its annual fair in August, with crafts, food and hand-churned ice cream sold by the Lucketts Elementary School PTA. The Lucketts Community Center, located in the original wooden Lucketts School has a day care service, pre-school, adult activities, and since 1974, bluegrass concerts every Saturday night at 7:00 PM from October through April.
