= Lucketts School =

- U.S. National Register of Historic Places
- Virginia Landmarks Register
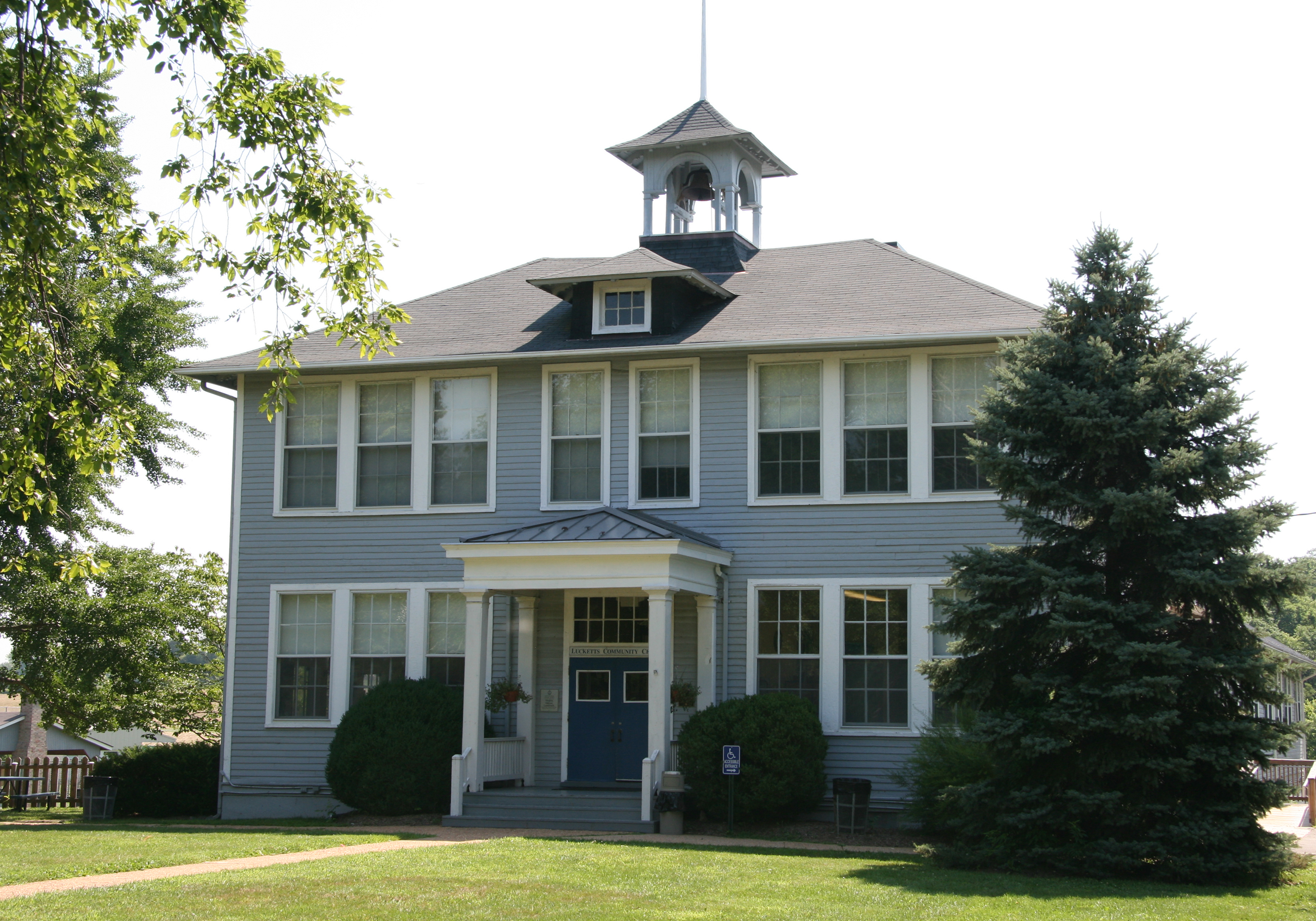
- Lucketts School, July 2008

- Location within Northern Virginia Location within Virginia Location within the United States
- Location: 42361 Lucketts Rd., Lucketts, Virginia
- Coordinates: 39°12′54″N 77°32′03″W
- Built: 1913
- Architect: Va. Dept. of Education; Case Bros. of Purcellville
- Architectural style: Colonial Revival, Bungalow/Craftsman
- NRHP reference No.: 93001125
- VLR No.: 053-0287

Significant dates
- Added to NRHP: October 14, 1993
- Designated VLR: August 18, 1993

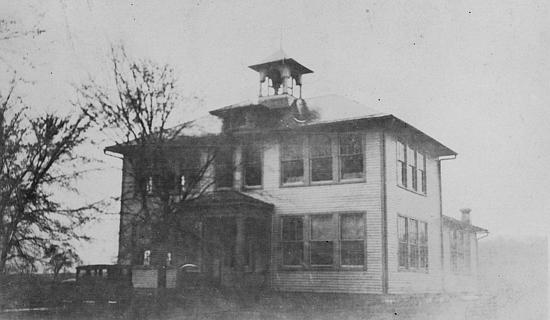
The school in 1928

The Lucketts School in Lucketts, Virginia was built in 1913. It is a wood-frame schoolhouse with elements of Colonial Revival and Craftsman style. It was originally known as Lucketts High School and was expanded in 1919 with additional classrooms and in 1929 with a small auditorium. It was one of the first multi-room schools in Loudoun County, and remains one of the best-preserved early 20th century schools in the county. The last high school students graduated from Lucketts in 1938, but the school was used as an elementary school until 1972 when a new Lucketts Elementary School was built on an adjoining site. Education still continues here in the form of certified child care offered to residents of Loudoun County.

In an effort to preserve the old school for community use the first Lucketts Fair was held in 1972, a tradition which continued until 2018 as a means of financing the maintenance of the building. It is now operated as the Lucketts Community Center by the Loudoun County Department of Parks and Recreation.

== Lucketts Bluegrass ==
The Lucketts Community Center is the home of the Lucketts Bluegrass concert series. The first concert was held on January 12, 1974, and the series has been running continuously since then. Concerts are currently held every other Saturday night from October through April. For 33 years, the series was run by an informal group of volunteers, in partnership with the Lucketts Community Center Advisory Board and the community center staff. In 2007, the Lucketts Bluegrass Foundation was formed to administer the bluegrass program in partnership with the community center. Over the years, many well known bluegrass acts have performed in the series, including the Johnson Mountain Boys, whose 1989 album "At The Old Schoolhouse" was recorded there in on February 20, 1988.
