= Rockaway =

Rockaway may refer to:

== Places in the United States ==
=== New Jersey ===
- Rockaway, New Jersey, a borough in Morris County
- Rockaway Township, New Jersey, a township in Morris County
- Rockaway Creek (New Jersey), a tributary of the Lamington River in Hunterdon County
- Rockaway River, a tributary of the Passaic River

=== New York ===
- Rockaway, Queens, a peninsula in the New York City borough of Queens, on Long Island
- Rockaway Avenue (disambiguation), subway stations in Brooklyn, New York City
- Rockaway Boulevard, a boulevard in Southern Queens
- Rockaway Inlet, a strait off Long Island, New York
- Rockaway Parkway, a parkway in Brooklyn
- East Rockaway, New York, a village in Nassau County on Long Island

=== Elsewhere ===
- Rockaway, Ohio, an unincorporated community
- Rockaway, Virginia, an unincorrpoated community
- Rockaway Beach (disambiguation)
- Rockaway Creek (California)

== Ships ==
- USS Rockaway (AVP-29), a United States Navy seaplane tender in commission from 1943 to 1946
- USCGC Rockaway (WAVP-377), a United States Coast Guard cutter in commission from 1949 to 1972

== Other uses ==
- Rockaway (2017 film), drama-film
- Rockaway (carriage), two types of carriage
- Rockaway Indians
- Eytan Rockaway, American film director
- The dance referred to in the Fat Joe song "Lean Back"
- "Rockaway" (Beres Hammond song), a 2003 single from the album Can't Stop A Man
