= Virginia Air Line Railway =

Virginia Air Line Railroad
Overview
- Headquarters: Troy, Virginia
- Reporting mark: VAL
- Locale: Central Virginia
- Dates of operation: 1908–1975
- Successor: abandoned

Technical
- Track gauge: 4 ft 8 1/2 in (1,435 mm) standard gauge
- Length: 29.8 miles (48.0 km)

Virginia Air Line Railroad (VAL) was a short-line railroad that operated from 1908 to 1975 in Central Virginia. It was built by the Virginia Air Line Railway Company to connect the Chesapeake and Ohio Railway's (C&O) Piedmont Subdivision at Lindsay, Virginia, to the Rivanna Subdivision of C&O's James River Line at Strathmore Yard, near Bremo Bluff, Virginia.

The route was once an important link for providing coal to power the Washington, D.C. area. However, facing increased competition from other modes of transportation such as trucks and automobiles, service on the rail line was cut back and eventually abandoned after 67 years of declining use.

== History ==
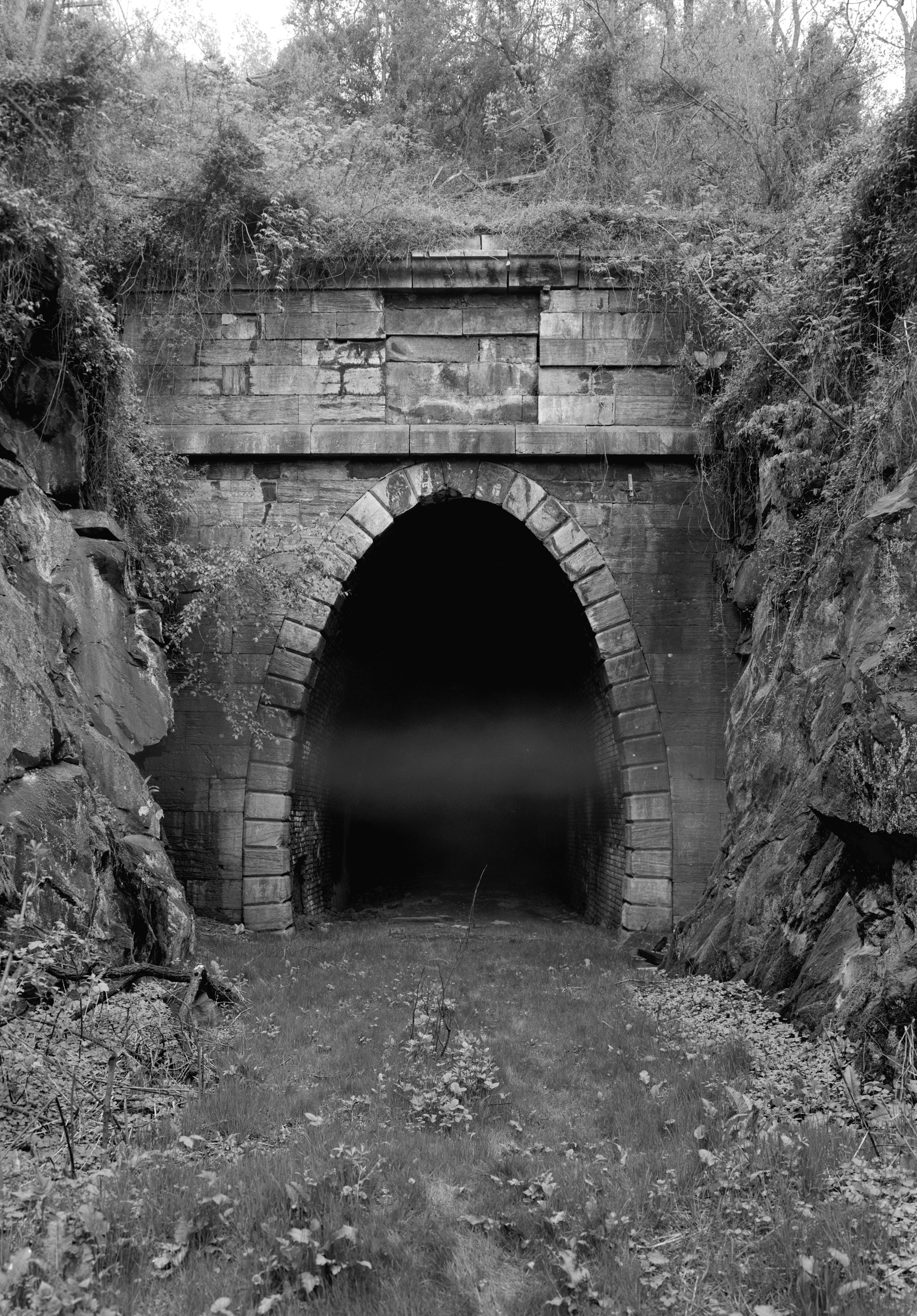
The Virginia Air Line Railway was designed to accommodate loads that could not fit through the Blue Ridge Tunnel.

The idea for the railroad originated from C&O president George Stevens. The Commonwealth of Virginia issued a charter to the Virginia Air Line Railway Company on April 10, 1906. Construction began in October 1906, under chief engineer Walter Washabaugh of Charlottesville, Virginia. Designed as an air-line railroad, the slope of grades were limited to 1 percent and the curvature of tracks were limited to six degrees. By 1907, 17 miles (27 km) of the approximately 30 miles (48 km) of planned track had been laid from the initial junction of Lindsay to the Fluvanna County seat of Palmyra. Six bridges were built on the railway: four under contract with the American Bridge Company, and one each by the Phoenix Bridge Company and the Virginia Bridge & Iron Company. A quarry was opened in Carysbrook to mine granite for bridge construction. The project was budgeted at $900,000 at a cost of about $30,000 per mile. Around May 1908, a full-service agency for the rail line was built in the town of Clarkland, newly renamed Troy after Virginia Air Line Railway company president "Captain" T. O. Troy.

Completed in October 1908, this branch route was built to handle cargo that would have otherwise been too tall or wide to fit through the tunnels that crossed the Blue Ridge Mountains between Charlottesville and Waynesboro. Coal destined for Washington, D.C. and Northern Virginia was sent down the James River Line to the southern junction of the route at Strathmore Yard, near Bremo Bluff. The shipments then proceeded up the Virginia Air Line to the northern junction at Lindsay, and continued on to Gordonsville. The railway also became an important line of communication that connected the small communities along the route with larger cities, such as Washington, D.C. C&O began to operate the company directly in July 1909, and acquired it outright in July 1912. Stevens stepped down as the president of C&O in 1920.

During the 1950s, young Ethel Mae Robinson, whose family members worked for C&O, became a regular sight along the route. Robinson, who lived near the tracks, waved so consistently at passing trains that the crew became accustomed to seeing her and brought her gifts until her teenage years. She later married William DeLong, who also worked for C&O.

=== 1942 collision ===
On July 31, 1942, four rail employees were killed when two trains were involved in a head-on collision on the Virginia Air Line Railway. Trains traveling in opposite directions were given a "meet order" to use a passing loop at Rockaway. However, a "meet" had not been coordinated on the line in 20 years. The northbound locomotive was having problems maintaining pressure for the uphill journey and collided with a coal train south of Palmyra. No passengers were on either train. Northbound railroad engineer Bill Ganzert was killed instantly and was found in the wreckage of the locomotive on the engineer's seat with his hand still on the steam pressure gauge. Brakeman Jack “J.J.” Ferrer survived burn injuries from the crash and joined a 1992 reunion of the surviving crew, organized at Bethel Baptist Church near Palmyra by retired trainmaster Frank Schumaker with the Fluvanna County Historical Society.

=== Decline ===
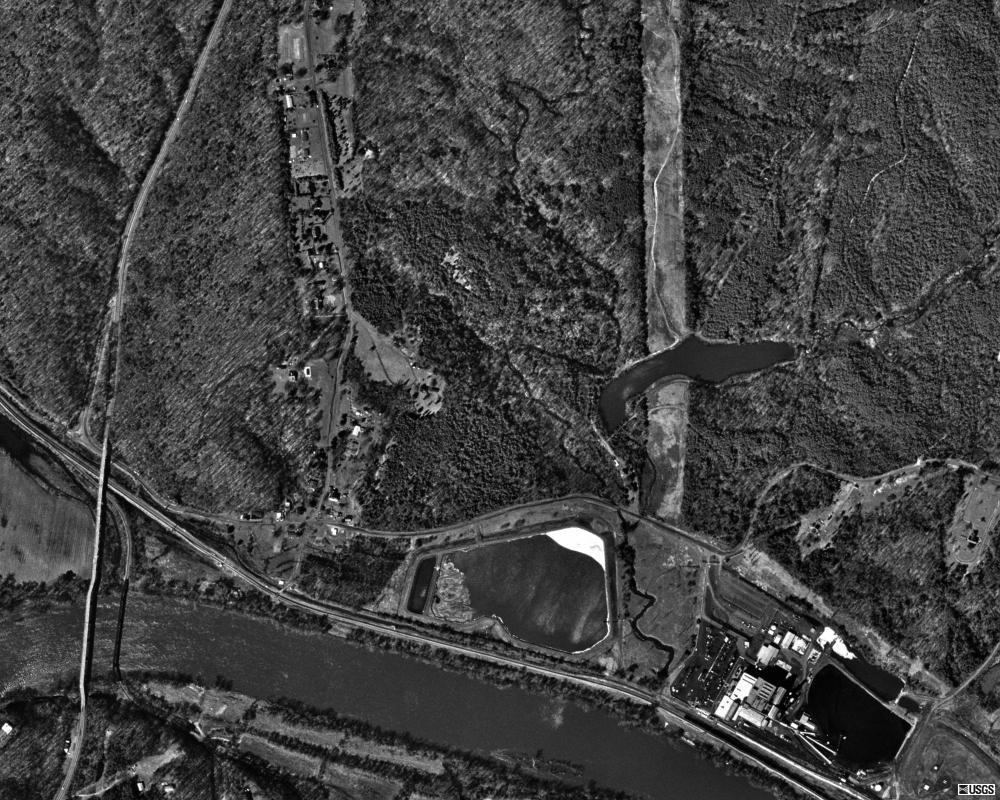
Aerial view of the rail line running along the James River at Bremo Bluff, with the power station in the bottom right corner.

In February 1927, dedicated passenger rail service was reduced to one train per day in each direction, and replaced by mixed trains in June 1932. The growing adoption of automobiles and airplanes had been taking business away from railroads since the 1930s. In 1931, the Virginia Electric & Power Company (now Dominion Resources) constructed a 30-megawatt coal-fired power station right along the path of the James River Line at Bremo Bluff, which did not require the connection through the Virginia Air Line Railway for coal shipments.

The railway's practice of mixing passengers and cargo amid declining traffic resulted in a $500 personal injury suit. 65-year-old farmer S. O. Butler claimed that he was injured on June 10, 1939, while disembarking from a moving train which had slowed down at Palmyra, rather than coming to a complete stop, because of its heavy load. The Supreme Court of Virginia ruled in favor of parent company C&O on June 8, 1942, as the conductor had discussed the circumstances ahead of time with the passengers and did not compel Butler to leave the train. By June 1954, all remaining mixed train service had come to an end.

On October 26, 1971, the Fluvanna Board of Supervisors sued C&O to keep the railway in operation. However, the Interstate Commerce Commission permitted C&O to proceed with plans to close the line. On August 1, 1973, the final train made its round trip on the route. After a one-year delay by the Environmental Protection Agency, the Virginia Air Line was officially abandoned on November 3, 1975. The remaining tracks were removed by August 25, 1978. On September 2, 1987, C&O itself was merged into CSX Transportation.

=== Revival as a trail ===
In 2003, the Fluvanna Heritage Trail Foundation acquired the right-of-way of the old Virginia Air Line for adaptive re-use as a rail trail. The pathway was cleared and publicly opened in 2004. In 2005, the foundation undertook restoration work to open a museum at the trailhead, as well as designing a replacement bridge at the Rivanna River in Palmyra, to provide access to views of the area.

== Route stops ==
The Virginia Air Line connected railroad junctions from the town of Lindsay to Strathmore Yard, near Bremo Bluff.
- Lindsay (northern junction with C&O's Piedmont Subdivision)
- Whitlock / Thelma
- Zion Crossroads
- Clarkland (renamed Troy in 1908)
- Wildwood
- Palmyra
- Rockaway
- Carysbrook
- Fork Union
- Bremo Bluff (southern junction at Strathmore Yard with C&O's James River Line)

== See also ==
- James River
- Virginia Central Railroad
