= Soering v United Kingdom =

1989 European Court of Human Rights ruling

Soering v United Kingdom 161 Eur. Ct. H.R. (ser. A) (1989) is a landmark judgment of the European Court of Human Rights (ECtHR) which established that extradition of a German national to the United States to face charges of capital murder and their potential exposure to the death row phenomenon violated Article 3 of the European Convention on Human Rights (ECHR) guaranteeing the right against inhumane and degrading treatment. In addition to the precedent established by the judgment, the judgment specifically resulted in the United States and the Commonwealth of Virginia committing to not seeking the death penalty against the German national involved in the case, and he was eventually extradited to the United States.

== Background ==
The applicant, Jens Söring, is a German national, born in 1966, who was brought by his parents to the United States at age 11. In 1984, he was an 18-year-old Echols Scholar at the University of Virginia, where he became good friends with Elizabeth Haysom, a Canadian national two years his elder.

Haysom's parents, Derek William Haysom and Nancy Astor Haysom, lived 65 miles (105 km) from the university, in the then unincorporated hamlet of Boonsboro, in Bedford County, Virginia. According to the account provided later to local police, Söring and Elizabeth Haysom decided to kill Haysom's parents; and, to divert suspicion, they rented a car in Charlottesville and drove to Washington D.C. On 30 March 1985, Söring drove to the Haysom residence and dined with the unsuspecting couple. During or after dinner, he picked a quarrel and viciously attacked them with a knife. In April 1985, both were found with their throats slit and with stab and slash wounds to the neck and body.

In October 1985, Söring and Elizabeth Haysom fled to Europe; and, on 30 April 1986, they were arrested in England, United Kingdom, on charges of cheque fraud. Six weeks later, a grand jury of the Circuit Court of Bedford County, Virginia, indicted Söring with the capital murder of the Haysoms, as well as their separate non-capital murders. On 11 August 1986, the United States requested extradition for the pair, based on the 1972 extradition treaty. A warrant was issued under section 8 of the Extradition Act 1870 (33 & 34 Vict. c. 52) for the arrest of Söring, and he was committed to await the Home Secretary's order to extradite him to the United States.

Söring filed a petition for habeas corpus with a divisional court and requested permission for judicial review of the decision to commit him, arguing that the Extradition Act 1870 did not permit extradition for a capital charge. He also cited article IV of the US–UK extradition treaty, which provides that an extradition request for a crime carrying the death penalty can be refused if the requesting country has not given "assurances [...] that the death penalty will not be carried out". No specific assurance was given by the United States or the Commonwealth of Virginia that prosecutors would not seek the death penalty or that Söring would not be executed. The UK government received only an undertaking from the Commonwealth Attorney of Bedford County to the effect that:

should Jens Söring be convicted of the offence of capital murder as charged in Bedford County, Virginia ... a representation will be made in the name of the United Kingdom to the judge at the time of sentencing that it is the wish of the United Kingdom that the death penalty should not be imposed or carried out.

Söring contended that this assurance was worthless. Virginia authorities later communicated to the UK government that they would not offer further assurances, as they intended to seek the death penalty against Söring.

On 11 December 1987, Lord Justice Lloyd, in the divisional court, admitted that the assurance "leaves something to be desired" but refused the request for judicial review, stating that Söring's request was premature, as the Home Secretary had not yet accepted the assurance.

Söring appealed to the Judicial Committee of the House of Lords, which rejected his claim on 30 June 1988. He then petitioned the Home Secretary without success, the latter permitting the extradition on 3 August 1988.

Anticipating this outcome, Söring had filed a claim with the European Commission of Human Rights (ECHR) on 9 July 1988, asserting that he would face inhuman and degrading treatment contrary to Article 3 of the European Convention on Human Rights ("the Convention") were he to be extradited to the US, it being likely that the death penalty would be applied.

Söring's arguments that the use by a non-Convention state of the death penalty would engage the right to life were novel, in that Article 2(1) of the Convention expressly permits the use of the death penalty, and Article 3 had never been interpreted to bring the death penalty, per se, within the prohibition of "inhuman or degrading treatment or punishment". The applicant, therefore, sought to make it clear that this was not the simple application of a punishment prescribed by law, but rather his exposure to the death row phenomenon, where he would be kept in detention for an unknown period, awaiting execution. The ECHR requested that no extradition take place pending the deliverance of its judgment.

== Judgement ==
=== European Commission of Human Rights ===
Söring's application was declared admissible on 10 November 1988, and the European Commission of Human Rights gave its judgment on 19 January 1989. It decided, by six votes to five, that in this particular case the extradition would not constitute inhuman or degrading treatment. It did, however, accept that the extradition of a person to a country "where it is certain or where there is a serious risk that the person will be subjected to torture or inhuman treatment the deportation or extradition would, in itself, under such circumstances constitute inhuman treatment."

=== European Court of Human Rights ===
On 7 July 1989, the ECHR handed down a unanimous judgment affirming the commission's conclusion that Article 3 could be engaged by the extradition process and that the extraditing state could be responsible for the breach where it is aware of a real risk that the person may be subject to inhuman or degrading treatment. Amnesty International intervened in the case and submitted that, in the light of "evolving standards in Western Europe regarding the existence and use of the death penalty", this punishment should be considered as inhuman and degrading and was therefore effectively prohibited by Article 3. This was not accepted by the ECHR, as the Convention does allow for the death penalty's use in certain circumstances. It followed that Article 3 could not stand in the way of the extradition of a suspect simply because they might be subject to the death penalty.

However, even if the extradition itself would not constitute a breach of Article 3, such factors as the execution method, the detainee's personal circumstances, the sentence's disproportionality to the gravity of the crime, and conditions of detention could all violate Article 3. To answer this question, the Court had to determine whether there was a "real risk" of Söring's being executed. The Court found that

it cannot be said that the undertaking to inform the judge at the sentencing stage of the wishes of the United Kingdom eliminates the risk of the death penalty being imposed. [...] the Commonwealth’s Attorney has himself decided to seek and to persist in seeking the death penalty because the evidence, in his determination, supports such action [...] If the national authority with responsibility for prosecuting the offence takes such a firm stance, it is hardly open to the Court to hold that there are no substantial grounds for believing that the applicant faces a real risk of being sentenced to death.

Departing from the commission's ruling, the ECHR concluded that the "death row phenomenon" did breach Article 3. They highlighted four factors that contributed to the violation:

- The length of detention prior to execution
- Conditions on death row
- Söring's age and mental condition
- The possibility of his extradition to Germany

As the ECtHR concluded:

[H]aving regard to the very long period of time spent on death row in such extreme conditions, with the ever present and mounting anguish of awaiting execution of the death penalty, and to the personal circumstances of the applicant, especially his age and mental state at the time of the offence, the applicant's extradition to the United States would expose him to a real risk of treatment going beyond the threshold set by Article 3. A further consideration of relevance is that in the particular instance the legitimate purpose of extradition could be achieved by another means [extradition or deportation to Germany], which would not involve suffering of such exceptional intensity or duration.

== Aftermath ==
The UK government obtained further assurances from the US regarding the death penalty before extraditing Söring to Virginia. He was tried and convicted of the first degree murders of the Haysoms and, on 4 September 1990, sentenced to two consecutive life terms. He served his sentence at the Buckingham Correctional Center in Dillwyn, Virginia. In 2019 he was paroled and deported to Germany.

Elizabeth Haysom did not contest her extradition from the UK and pleaded guilty to conspiring to kill her parents. On 6 October 1987, the court sentenced her to 45-years-per-count to be served consecutively. She was incarcerated at the Fluvanna Correctional Center for Women until her parole and deportation to her native Canada in February 2020.

== Significance ==
Soering v. United Kingdom is important in four respects:

- It enlarges the scope of a state's responsibility for breaches of the convention. A signatory State must now consider consequences of returning an individual to a third country where he might face treatment that breaches the convention. This is notwithstanding that the ill-treatment may be beyond its control, or even that general assurances have been provided that no ill-treatment will take place.
- By finding a breach of the convention on the territory of a non-signatory State, the Court considerably expanded the obligation to its signatory States. Not only are signatories responsible for consequences of extradition suffered outside their jurisdiction, but this jurisdiction implicitly extends to actions in non-signatory States. The convention also overrides agreements concluded with such States.
- The rationale of the Court's judgment applies equally to deportation cases, where other articles of the Convention may apply, such as Article 6 (right to a fair trial), as seen in Othman (Abu Qatada) v. United Kingdom (2012).
- The Court's approach to the death penalty, itself permitted by the text of the original Convention, may reduce its use by non-signatory States that seek to extradite suspects from signatory States. The decision makes it difficult, if not impossible, for the US and other capital punishment countries to extradite suspects on capital charges from signatory States, without giving assurances that the death penalty will not be executed.

== Bibliography ==
- Lillich, Richard B. (January 1991). "The Soering Case". The American Journal of International Law. 85 (1): 128–149. doi:10.1017/S0002930000011398. JSTOR 2203565. S2CID 181800709.

== See also ==
- Restrictions on extraditions
- Death row phenomenon
- European Convention on Human Rights
