= Murder of Robert Schwartz =

2001 murder in Leesburg, Virginia

The murder of Robert Schwartz occurred on December 8, 2001, in Leesburg, Virginia. The crime was orchestrated by his 20-year-old daughter, Clara Jane Schwartz, as part of a fantasy role-playing game. The killing itself was perpetrated by her 18-year-old friend Kyle Hulbert, who had a history of mental illness; 21-year-old Michael Pfohl and 19-year-old Katherine Inglis were accessories to the crime. The case made national headlines due to Schwartz's prominence in the scientific community and for claims that his murder was related to role-playing games and the occult.

== Background ==
Robert Schwartz was a nationally renowned scientist in the field of biometrics and DNA research. In 1978, he was co-author with Margaret Dayhoff of a key paper in Science providing the first experimental evidence of Lynn Margulis' theory of the symbiogenetic origin of cellular mitochondria and chloroplasts. In 1992, Schwartz was a founding member of the Virginia Biotechnology Association. He was the father of three children: Catherine Michele, Jesse, and Clara Jane.

== Murder ==
On December 8, 2001, Michael Pfohl, accompanied by his girlfriend Katherine Inglis, drove Kyle Hulbert to Schwartz's Leesburg, Virginia, farmhouse. Schwartz let Hulbert inside, and Hulbert then stabbed him to death with a two-foot sword. Schwartz's body was discovered two days later.

=== Investigation ===
Police identified Pfohl as the owner of a car that called a tow truck for assistance near the house around the time of the murder and brought him and his girlfriend Inglis in for an interrogation. On December 11, 2001, Inglis made statements to the police implicating Schwartz's daughter Clara in his murder, claiming that Clara discussed the murder with the three of them beforehand. Inglis stated that the motive for the murder was that Schwartz had hit Clara and she believed that he tried to poison her.

Clara, who was a sophomore at James Madison University at the time of the murder, was charged on February 2, 2002. She was formally indicted for the murder, as well as conspiracy to commit murder and solicitation of murder charges, on March 31, 2002. Inglis, Pfohl, and Hulbert had all been indicted previously for Schwartz's murder.

=== Trial ===
Clara was the first of the four co-defendants to go on trial in October 2002. The prosecutors portrayed her as a manipulative young woman who used her role-playing game, Underworld, to convince her friends to kill her father. Prosecutor Jennifer Wexton argued that "Clara Schwartz wanted her father dead; she had hated her father for a long time", and that after failing to enlist a friend named Patrick to kill her father, Clara became desperate.

The defense argued that the man who had committed the murder, Kyle Hulbert, had taken Clara's directives to kill her father out of the context of their role-playing game. Clara's attorney persisted that Clara "never intended for any person to kill her father." However, Patrick, testifying for the prosecution, stated that Clara spoke increasingly about killing Schwartz and had researched herbal poisons in order to make his death appear natural. Patrick also testified that Clara spoke of how much money she stood to inherit if Schwartz died, and her concerns that he would cut her out of his will. He stated that Clara became increasingly frustrated because he was not carrying out her wishes, and later found a willing participant in Hulbert.

=== Aftermath ===
On October 15, 2002, the jury convicted Clara of first-degree murder. On February 10, 2003, she was sentenced to serve 48 years in prison. She is currently incarcerated in the Fluvanna Correctional Center for Women near Troy, Virginia, and has a tentative release date of November 2, 2043. Clara has made many unsuccessful attempts to appeal her conviction, the most recent being affirmed by the United States Court of Appeals for the Fourth Circuit on March 9, 2010.

For their roles in the murder, Hulbert was sentenced to life imprisonment without the possibility of parole, serving his sentence at River North Correctional Center; Pfohl was sentenced to eighteen years. Inglis served a one-year sentence for conspiracy to commit murder.

== In the media ==
- The case was featured on a 2012 episode of the Oxygen Network program Snapped; an episode of the Investigation Discovery program Fatal Encounters; an episode of the Investigation Discovery program The Perfect Murder; the 2013 episode "Souls of Stone" of the Investigation Discovery series Deadly Women; and an episode of Occult Crimes.
- The true crime book I'd Kill For You by M. William Phelps, published in 2015, covers this case in-depth.
