= Cariole =

Type of carriage used in the 19th century

Cariole and carriole are names used for several different horse-drawn vehicles, including a Norwegian cart, a French cart, and a Canadian sleigh. The name is French in origin; however, the vehicles vary significantly. The similarly sounding carryall is a New England term for a type of four-wheeled carriage.

== Cariole — Norwegian cart ==
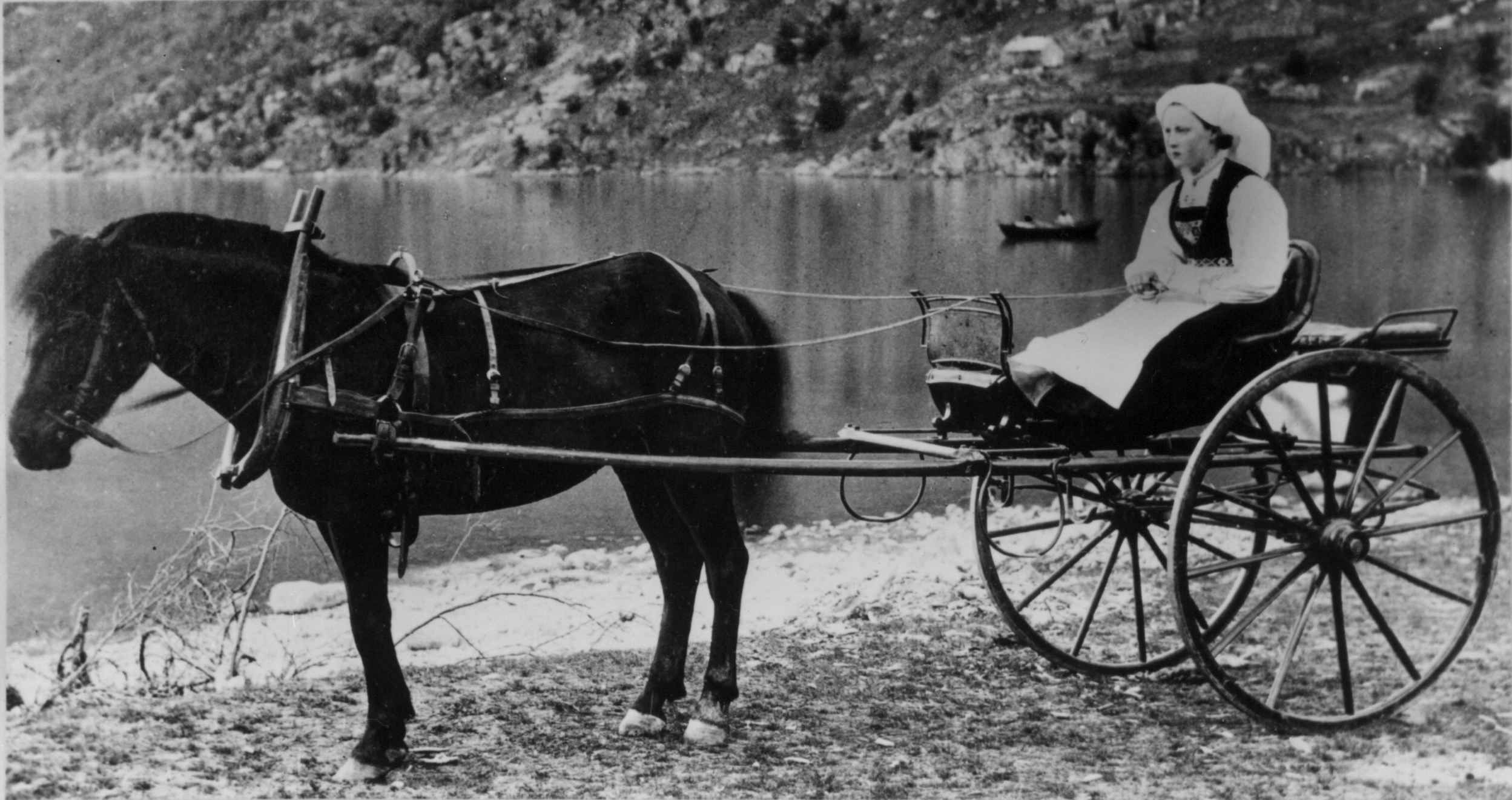
Norwegian cariole

The Norwegian cariole is a very narrow two-wheeled cart designed for a single passenger, usually with a luggage rack or platform behind. Early examples lacked springs and relied on exceptionally long flexible shafts to provide resilience, though later versions added spring suspension.

The Danish spelling of the Norwegian cariole is kariol, and a related Danish form is known as a karid.

== Carriole — French cart ==
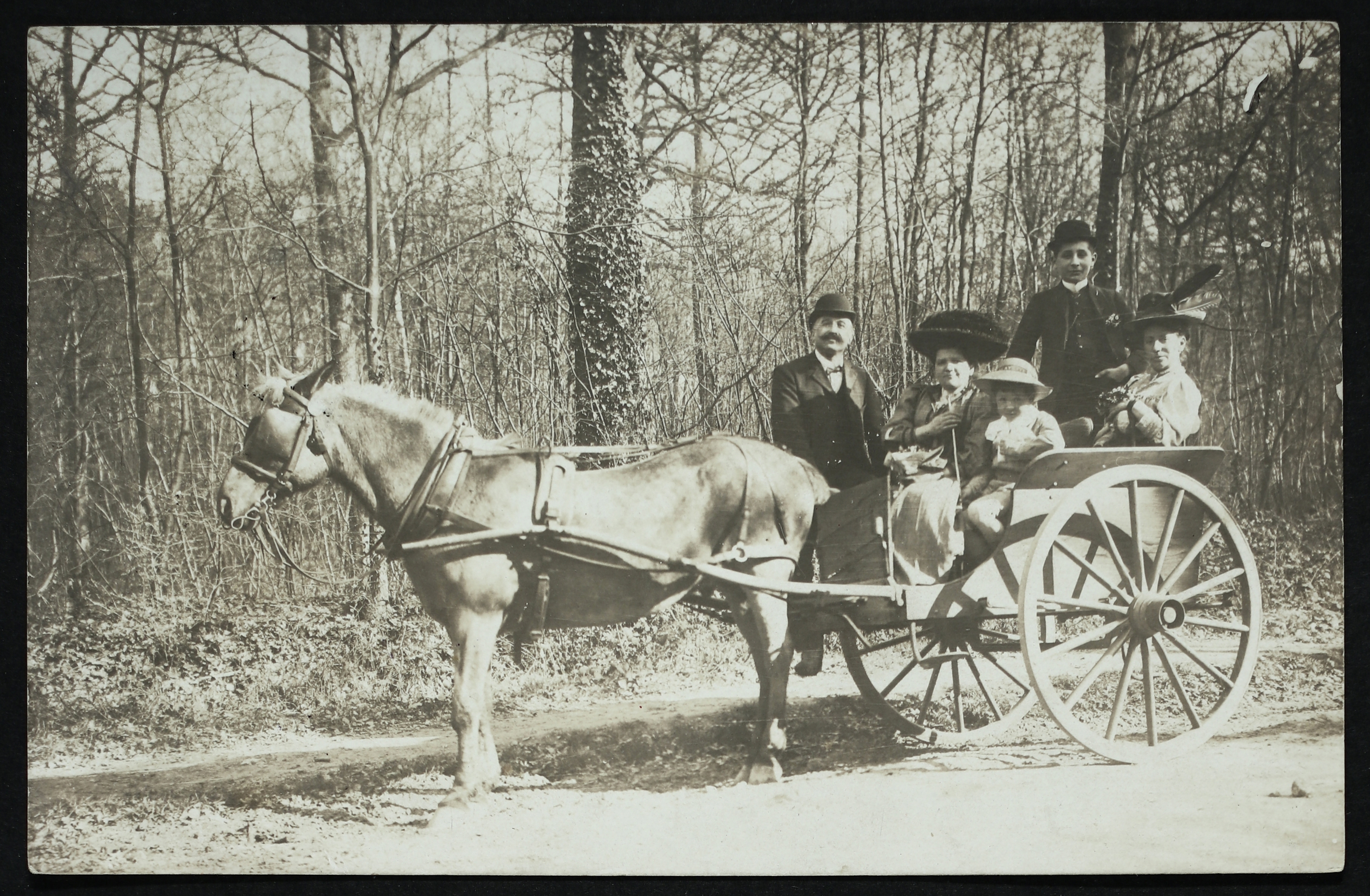
French carriole

In France, a carriole is a light utilitarian cart. Although the name resembles the Norwegian term, the French vehicle is structurally different and served general transport rather than personal travel.

== Cariole — Canadian sleigh ==
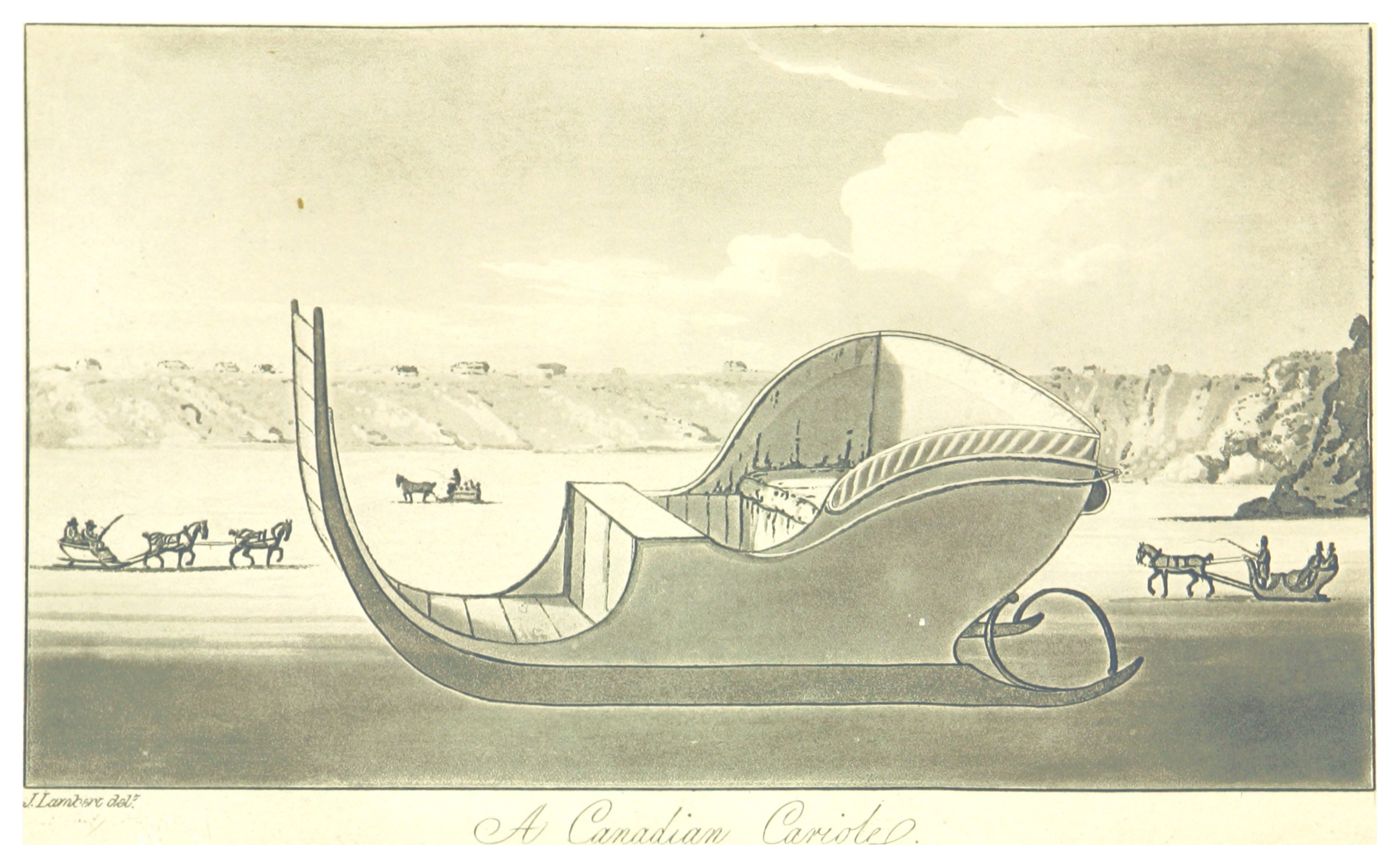
Canadian cariole

In French-Canadian usage, a cariole is a small low sleigh drawn by a single horse. The passenger seat for two is in the rear, and there is a low seat in front for the driver. Carioles were commonly used for winter travel over snow and frozen rivers.

== Carryall — New England carriage ==
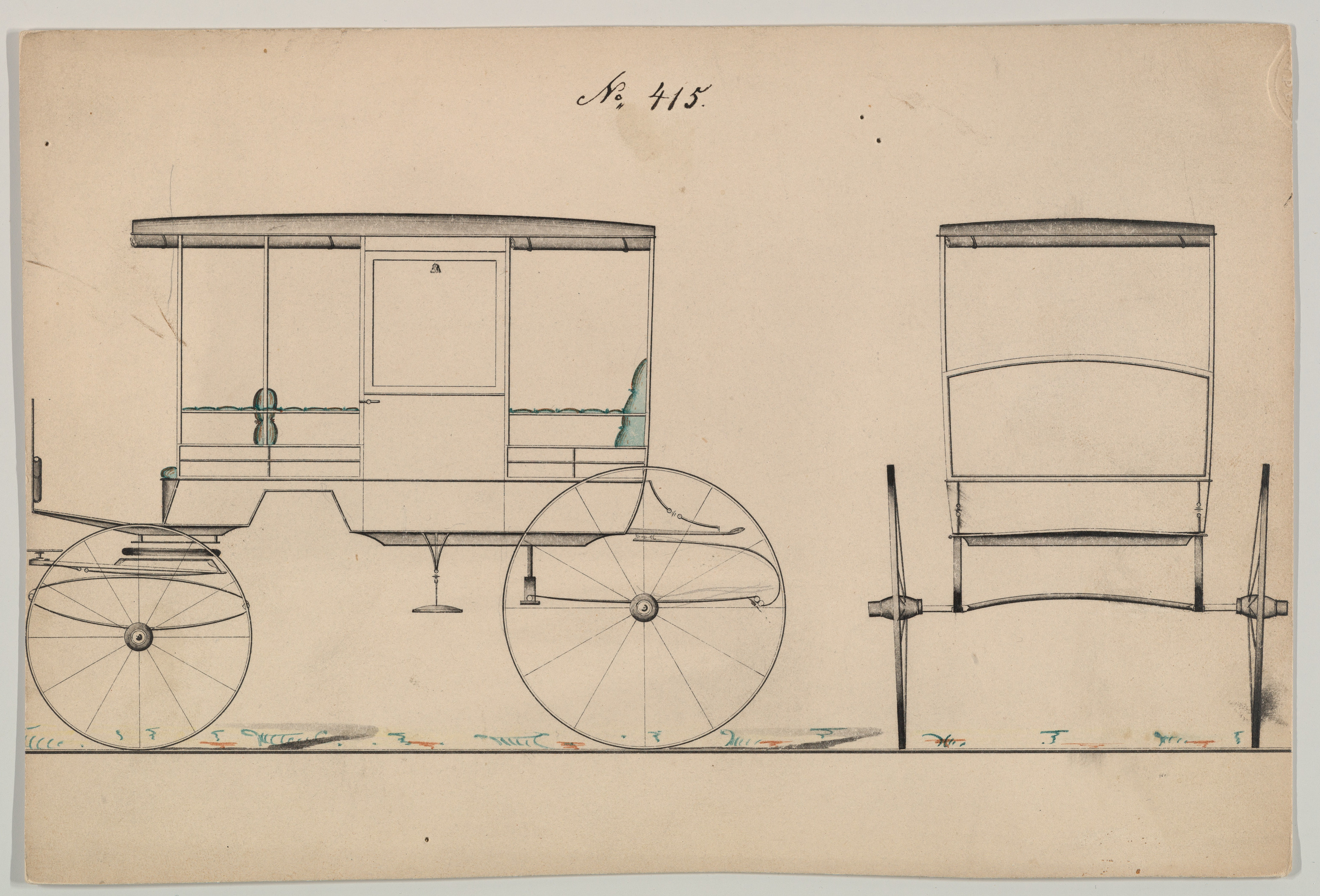
New England carryall

The term carryall was used in New England for a light rockaway carriage, a relatively large four-wheeled carriage. Despite the similarity in sound, the word is not derived from cariole and refers to an unrelated vehicle type.

== See also ==
- Carriage
