= Jens Söring =

German convicted murderer (born 1966)

- Born: 1 August 1966 (age 60); Bangkok, Thailand
- Status: Paroled
- Motive: Victims didn't approve of his relationship on Elizabeth Haysom's parents of their daughter; Rage over Haysom's mother alleged sexual abuse of her (suspected)
- Conviction: First degree murder (2 counts)
- Penalty: Life imprisonment

Details
- Victims: Derek William Haysom, 72; Nancy Astor Haysom, 53
- Date: 30 March 1985; 41 years ago
- Country: United States
- State: Virginia
- Weapon: Knife
- Date apprehended: April 30, 1986

Jens Söring (German pronunciation: [ˈjɛns ˈzœʁiːŋ]; born 1 August 1966), usually rendered in English as Jens Soering, is a German convicted double murderer.

In 1990, he was convicted in Virginia, United States of America of murdering the parents of his then-girlfriend, Elizabeth Haysom. For her role in the deaths, Haysom was convicted of two counts of accessory before the fact to murder.

In prison, Söring claimed he was not guilty. After fourteen parole requests and numerous petitions for a gubernatorial pardon - all unsuccessful - he was released on probation and deported to Germany in 2019. Söring appears on talk shows, has an exclusive contract with Netflix and uses his case in the media. In Germany, for legal reasons, Söring is not allowed to accuse his ex-girlfriend of the crime. Instead, Söring portrayed himself as a victim and critic of an unjust US justice system.

The killings took place at the Haysom residence in the Boonsboro area of Lynchburg, Virginia in March 1985. Söring (along with Elizabeth Haysom) fled the United States shortly thereafter. They were arrested in London in April 1986. His fight against extradition led to the landmark judgment of the European Court of Human Rights in Soering v United Kingdom which establishes that his extradition to the USA would've been unlawful due to the prevalence of the psychological 'death row phenomenon' which would violate Article 3 of the ECHR (prohibition of torture and inhuman and degrading treatment). Söring was extradited after the authorities in Bedford County gave assurances that they would not seek the death penalty.

Following his arrest in 1986, Söring confessed to the murders during interrogation by police, but at his trial in 1990 he pleaded not guilty, claiming he confessed to shield Haysom from prosecution, believing that he had diplomatic immunity. Söring was convicted and sentenced to two consecutive life sentences. Alleging irregularities in the investigation leading to his arrest and in his trial, in the years following his conviction Söring filed a number of legal appeals and post-conviction petitions. All were rejected by the courts.

During his incarceration, Söring converted from Buddhism to Roman Catholicism and wrote multiple books about his life in prison and his religious beliefs. His 2007 book The Convict Christ was awarded first prize by the Catholic Press Association of North America in the category "Social Concerns".

== Early life and education ==
Jens Söring was born on 1 August 1966, in Bangkok as the son of a German diplomat, Klaus Söring. He moved to the United States in 1977 and graduated from The Lovett School in Atlanta, Georgia, in 1984. He then attended the University of Virginia where he entered into a relationship with fellow student Elizabeth Haysom.

== Crimes, confessions and extradition ==
In March 1985, when Söring was 18 and Haysom was 20, Haysom's parents, Derek (born 1913) and Nancy Haysom (born 1931), were murdered in their home in the Boonsboro neighborhood in Lynchburg, Virginia. Six months after the murders, with investigators closing in on the couple, Söring and Haysom fled to England where they lived under assumed names.

On 30 April 1986, Söring and Haysom were arrested for fraud after writing over $5,000 ($13,577.17 in 2023) in fake checks, using false papers, and lying to the police in London, England. Under questioning by British, American, West German and Virginia authorities, Söring confessed to the double murder several times to several authorities, including medical persons.

Haysom waived extradition. Söring fought extradition on the basis that the capital punishment and especially the exposure to the so-called death row phenomenon, i.e. the emotional distress felt by prisoners on death row constitute inhuman or degrading treatment as forbidden by Article 3 of the European Convention on Human Rights. On 7 July 1989, the European Court of Human Rights agreed with this assessment and ruled in Soering v United Kingdom that extradition to countries where the accused faces the death row phenomenon is unlawful. After this decision, the authorities in Bedford County agreed not to pursue the death penalty, and Söring was extradited to the United States on 12 January 1990.

== Trial and conviction ==
Haysom pleaded guilty and then testified against Söring. At trial, she testified that Söring committed the murders and that she was an accessory to the crime.

Söring was tried for two counts of first degree murder in 1990. According to the prosecution, he committed the murders and Haysom was an accessory before the fact. Söring pleaded not guilty, stating he made a false confession to protect Haysom, as he assumed he would have diplomatic immunity.

Söring was sentenced to two consecutive life terms. Haysom was sentenced to 90 years imprisonment (one 45-year sentence for each murder, to be served consecutively). She had a mandatory release date in 2032 when she would have been 68 years old but was released concurrently with Söring and deported to Canada in December 2019.

=== Alleged irregularities ===
Since the trial, Söring has raised several issues regarding his trial: Richard Neaton, Söring's defense attorney, was subsequently disciplined and eventually disbarred for reasons unrelated to Söring's case and admitted to having had a drug problem while representing Söring; moreover, the judge, William M. Sweeney, knew Nancy Haysom's brother (Elizabeth's uncle) and had presided over Elizabeth's court proceeding. Ed Sulzbach, an FBI profiler who according to some familiar with the case was asked to consult, concluded that the crime had been committed by a female who knew the Haysoms, settling on Elizabeth as the likely killer. The detective working on the case, Ricky Gardner, denied that a profile had been created by Sulzbach. No report was entered into evidence at Söring's trial.

A blood-smeared sock print was introduced as main evidence against Söring. The prosecution's expert witness, Robert Hallett, who was not an expert on footprints, claimed that he was able to match it perfectly to Söring. An FBI agent interviewed by WVTF in 2018 dismissed the witnesses' methods as a "magic trick" and noted that Sulzbach had matched the sock to a female in his report.

In 2009, the 42 pieces of DNA evidence from the crime scene were tested (technology was previously not sufficiently advanced). Of the 42, 31 were either too small or degraded to yield results. The 11 samples successfully tested excluded both Söring and Elizabeth Haysom.

== Further investigations and parole requests ==
Jens Söring began to be eligible for parole in 2003. His twelfth parole request was denied at the beginning of 2017. A petition for an absolute pardon was filed on 22 August 2016.

Chuck Reid, one of the original investigators of the Haysom murders, has occasionally agreed to be interviewed about the case. His participation in the 2016 documentary The Promise led him to take his long-standing doubts about the outcome more seriously.

During an interview in 2016, Haysom, who usually shunned media attention, said Söring had killed her parents in a rage after learning that her mother had sexually abused her. Söring had contended that Haysom killed her parents on her own over the abuse, albeit she originally denied that any such abuse had occurred. In the same interview, Haysom said she was "profoundly ashamed" of her role in the murders of her parents and criticized Söring for maintaining his innocence.

On 3 May 2017, Albemarle County Sheriff J. E. "Chip" Harding released a 19-page report on a months-long investigation he had conducted on this case. He concluded that Jens Söring is innocent and asked Governor McAuliffe to pardon him. On 27 September 2017, Harding held a press conference and advocated for Söring's release together with another investigator, Richard L. Hudson Jr. They also presented expert testimony of three forensic scientists who agreed that Söring's DNA did not match the blood found on the crime scene.

On 10 October 2017, Germany's ambassador Peter Wittig and its former president Christian Wulff, amongst Söring's Counsel Steven Rosenfield and others, attended Söring's 13th parole hearing. Following this hearing, Wittig told the assembled media "We are deeply convinced of the innocence of Jens Söring."

On 27 October 2017, a further press conference was held by Gail Starling Marshall, former Deputy Attorney General of Virginia, where Söring's counsel, Steven Rosenfield, announced that the University of Richmond School of Law's Institute for Actual Innocence supports Söring's pardon petition based on the DNA evidence excluding Söring.

On 25 November 2019, Governor Ralph Northam accepted the Virginia Parole Board's recommendation to release both Haysom and Söring. Neither received a gubernatorial pardon but were released into the custody of US Immigration and Customs Enforcement (ICE) for deportation to their home countries of Canada and Germany, respectively, and remain ineligible to reenter the United States.

On 17 December 2019, Söring returned to Germany by landing in Frankfurt.

== Media presence ==
Jens Söring has published eight books and works as a speaker and consultant. After his deportation to Germany, he was a guest on numerous well-known German talk shows. In Germany, for legal reasons, he is not allowed to accuse his ex-girlfriend of the crime. Söring portrayed himself as a victim and critic of the system who defends himself against the injustice of the US justice system. In autumn 2023, Söring appeared in an exclusive Netflix special.

German journalist Felix Jung wrote: "German talk shows such as Markus Lanz, the NDR Talkshow and Stern TV enable the convicted double murderer Jens Söring to present himself uncritically as a victim of US justice. Instead of critically questioning criminals, the media enables the opposite through their sensational reporting: a cult of personality that can be marketed in pop culture."

== Life in prison and writings ==
Söring served his sentence at the Buckingham Correctional Center in Dillwyn, Virginia. While in prison, he converted from Buddhism to Roman Catholicism. Söring has published several books and articles while incarcerated. In 1995, he wrote Mortal Thoughts, describing it as "The autobiography of a young man imprisoned for a double-murder he did not commit." In 2007, his book The Convict Christ was awarded first prize by the Catholic Press Association of North America in the category, "Social Concerns."

- Mortal Thoughts. 1995
- The Way of the Prisoner: Breaking the Chains of Self Through Centering Prayer and Centering Practice. New York: Lantern Books. 2003. ISBN 1-59056-055-8.
- An Expensive Way to Make Bad People Worse: An Essay On Prison Reform from an Insider's Perspective. New York: Lantern Books. 2004. ISBN 1-59056-076-0.
- The Convict Christ: What the Gospel Says About Criminal Justice. Maryknoll, New York: Orbis Books. 2006. ISBN 1-57075-648-1.
- The Church of the Second Chance: A Faith-Based Approach to Prison Reform. New York: Lantern Books. 2008. ISBN 978-1-59056-112-6.
- One Day in the Life of 179212: Notes from an American Prison. New York: Lantern Books. 2012. ISBN 978-1-59056-345-8.
- A Far, Far Better Thing. New York: Lantern Books. 2017. ISBN 978-1-59056-564-3. (Written by Jens Söring and Bill Sizemore, with a foreword by Martin Sheen)
- Son of the Promise. Amazon. 2019. ASIN B081NFXCMC.

== Documentaries ==
A full-length documentary film about the case, Killing for Love (German: Das Versprechen or The Promise), by Marcus Vetter and Karin Steinberger, premiered at the Munich International Film Festival and was released theatrically in October 2016. It had its North American premiere on 5 November 2016, at the Virginia Film Festival. In the U.K. the film was expanded into a six-part series shown in March 2017 on BBC Four as part of the documentary strand Storyville. In the Netherlands, public broadcaster NPO2 showed the film in two parts in its documentary series 2Doc in April 2017.

A podcast inspired by the documentary Killing for Love (in German, Das Versprechen) was reproduced and publicized in the United States by AMC Theatres, in collaboration with Amanda Knox's true crime podcast, The Truth About True Crime. Another podcast based on his case was published by Jason Flom and novelist John Grisham, Did a Fatal Attraction Lead to a Wrongful Conviction? The Story of Jens Soering.

In 2022, an eight-part German podcast series called "Das System Söring" ("The Söring System") was released by German journalists Alice Brauner and Johanna Behre, which critically assessed different aspects of Söring's life, including his supporters, his testimony, and media coverage around his person.

In 2023, a 4-part German docuseries titled, "Till Murder Do Us Part: Soering vs. Haysom" was released internationally to Netflix. This docuseries comprised four episodes, reviewed the case, and included footage from the trial, news broadcasts surrounding the trial, and interviews taken more recently about the release of the series. Episode 1, "A Love Story", reviewed the backgrounds of Söring and Haysom and the lead up to the court trial; Episode 2, "Liz," reviewed Elizabeth Haysom's trial in Virginia; Episode 3, "Jens", reviewed Jens Söring's trial also in Virginia four years after Haysom's once he'd been extradited from England; Episode 4, "Linked Forever," overviewed the entirety of the trial and what Haysom and Söring are doing today post-incarceration. Jens Söring gives real-time interviews throughout the course of the docuseries, however in Episode 4, the cousin of Elizabeth Haysom, Phyllis Workman, says at timestamp 33:50 that Haysom developed a good relationship with her [Haysom's] paternal half-siblings, and that they requested that she [Haysom] not give any more interviews regarding the case in the future, to which Workman says Haysom has agreed to and has followed through on; thus Haysom did not participate at any time in the interview directly herself. The series was co-directed by Andre Hörmann and Lena Leonhardt.
