= Landaulet =

Landaulet may refer to:

- Landaulet (carriage), horse-drawn carriage
- Landaulet (car), automobile
