= Landau (carriage) =

Luxury four-wheeled open carriage

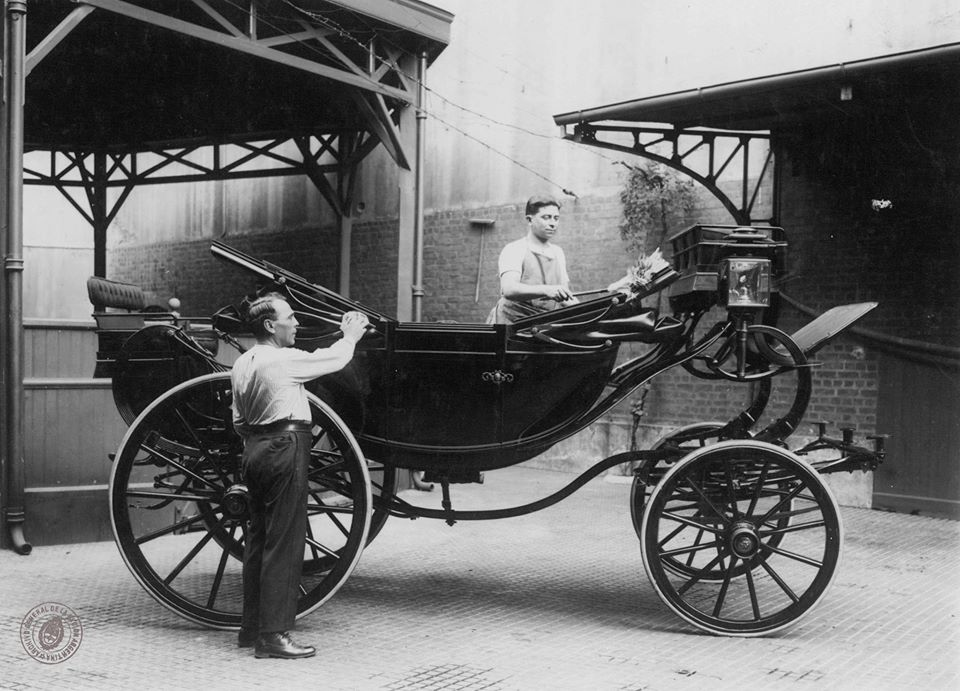
Landau with the cover folded down

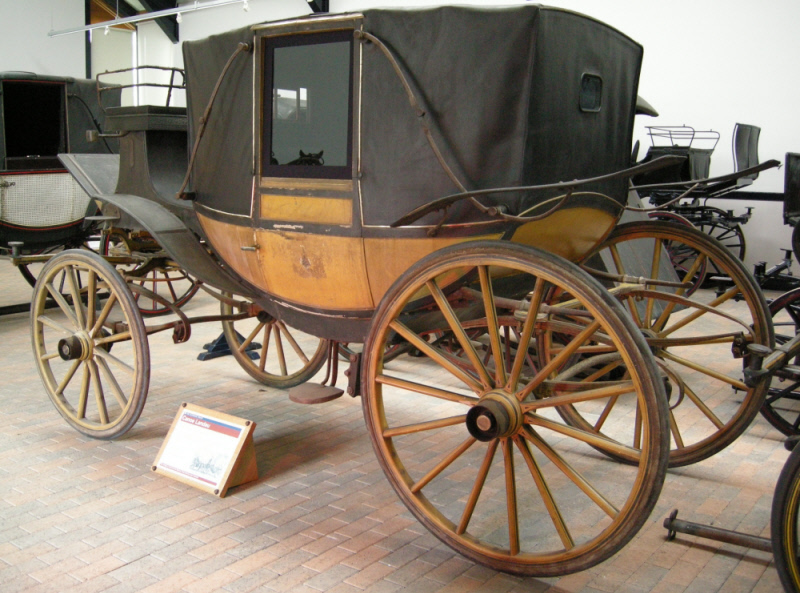
Landau with the cover raised

A landau (pronounced LAN-dow) is a large four-wheeled carriage with a leather cover that can be folded down, essentially a coach with a falling top. The low shell of the landau provides maximal visibility of the occupants and their attire, a feature that makes a landau a popular choice for ceremonial occasions.

== Design ==
A landau is a horse-drawn vehicle pulled by a pair or four-in-hand of horses, and usually suspended on elliptical springs. It is in the vis-à-vis family of carriages with face-to-face seats over a dropped footwell. The landau has a continuous sweep, a baseline that flows in a single curve. There are two iron and leather folding hoods that latch together to enclose the carriage. In the open position, the hoods usually lie flat, but are sometimes constructed to be removable.

The landau's centre section might contain a fixed full-height glazed door, or more usually a low half-door. A window at the door was able to raise and lower, or fold down. There is either a separate raised open coachman's seat, but a landau can also be postilion-driven. There is usually a seat above the rear axle, behind the passenger compartment, for one or two grooms.

In the 1880s some French coachbuilders experimented with landaus that replaced the traditional folding leather top with rigid, fabric‑lined panels. These panels were painted on the exterior and hinged to open or close automatically, creating a vehicle that retained the interior layout and social function of a landau while presenting the outward appearance of a closed carriage. This hybrid form eliminated the bulky hood irons and leatherwork normally associated with the type, and contemporary commentators have noted its resemblance to a small berlin. Examples were exhibited in Paris by builders such as Felber and Ehrler.

=== Variations ===
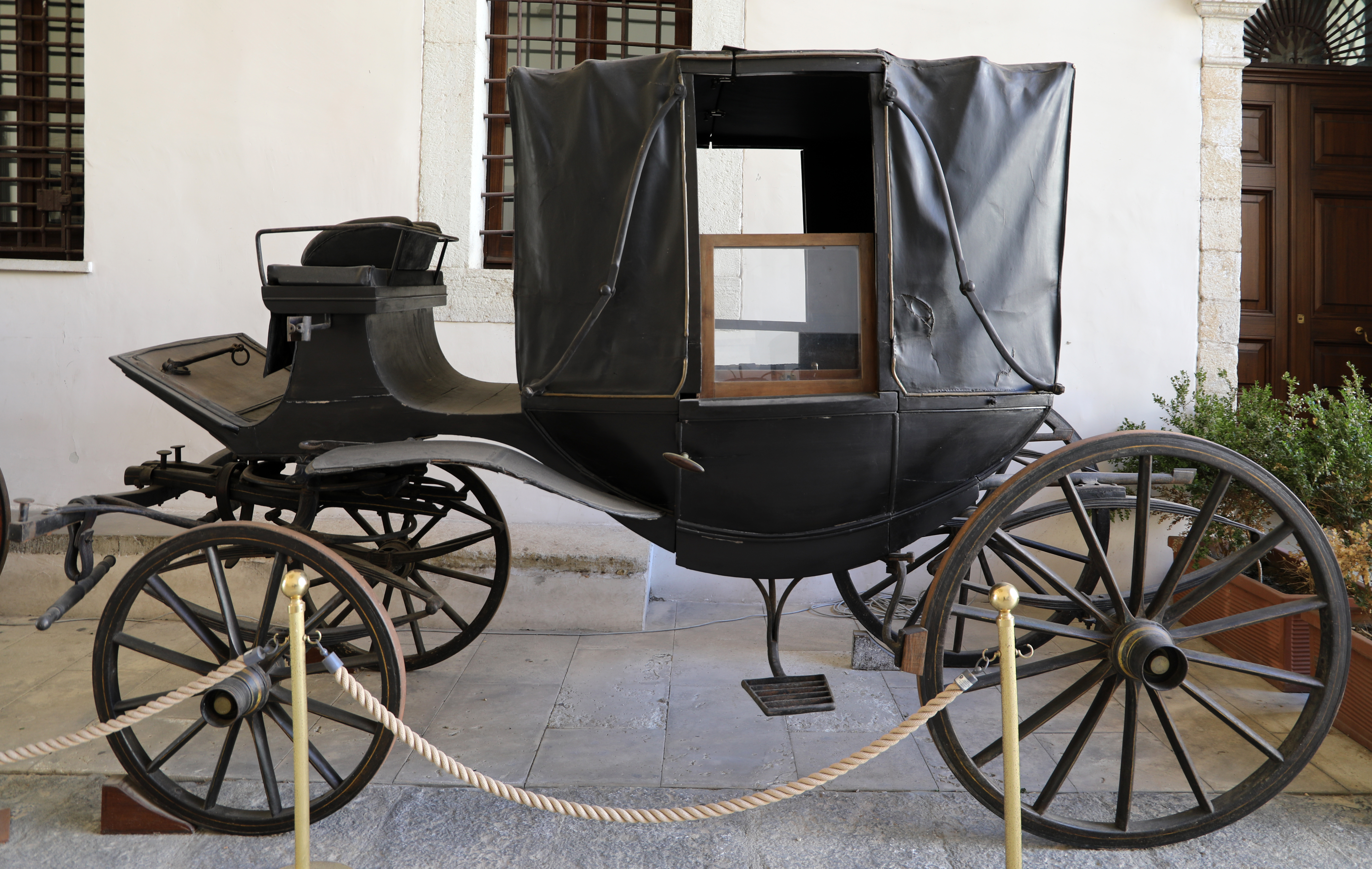
Canoe-style landau

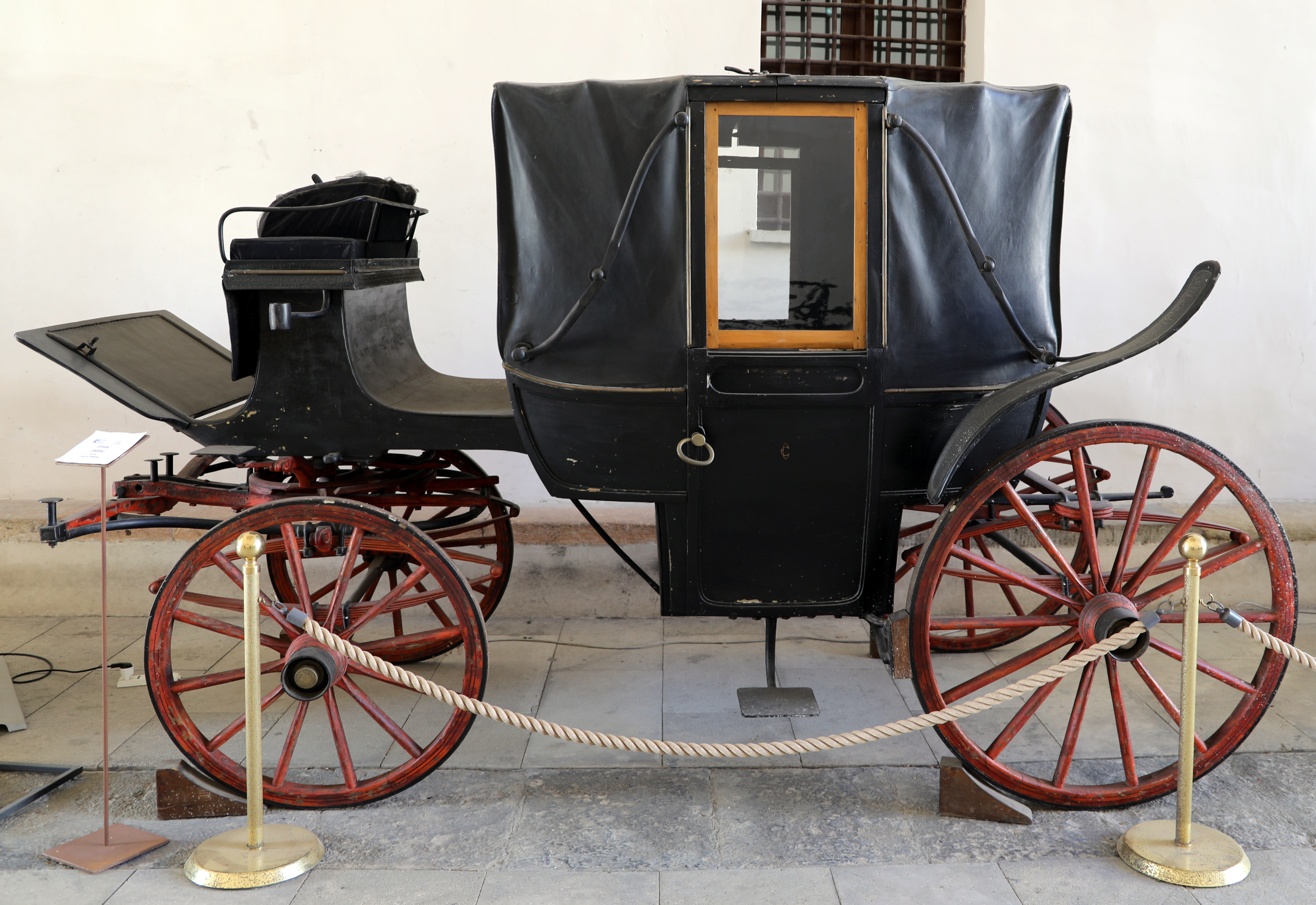
Angular style landau

The body of a landau can be constructed with a graceful continuous curved bottom-line like a canoe, or with angular lines and a dropped centre well. The French-style canoe-shaped landaus may be called canoe, gondola or Sefton landaus. English-style angular landaus may be called angular, square, or Shelburne. Round cornered landau styles have rounded corners and include the English quarter landau, Barker quarter landau and others made by London coachbuilder Barker.

Many landaus are used as formal state carriages. A postillion landau is drawn by multiple horses, postilion style (no coachman's seat). A state landau or dress landau is a large curved vehicle drawn by four horses, guided by postilions and out-riders, and used on state or formal occasions. A semi-state landau is smaller and less elaborate. The Ascot landau is used by the British royal family for parading down the racecourse for Royal Ascot, drawn by four horses and guided by postilion.

Other variations of landau include:

- Amempton: landau patented 1855 by Edwin Kesterton of London.
- Austrian landau: closer in style to a Victoria with a fixed non-retractable canopy-type hood, drawn by two horses.
- Barouche-landau: a sporting barouche driven to four horses.
- Britzka landau: a patented 1838 English variation of the Britzka with a folding hood.
- Clarence landau: India version with slats or blinds over the windows.
- Diphora: a particular low-slung design displayed at the Great Exhibition of 1851.
- Glass-front, glass-quarter, and five-glass landaus: have wood and glass framed windows in the fore-part of the vehicle—a front windscreen and up to two windows on each side.
- Landaulet or demi-landau: angular and shortened coupé version only seating two passengers and drawn by one or two horses. The earliest use of the word shown in the Oxford English Dictionary is in a patent of 1771, using the former spelling landawlet. Sometimes called a coupelet. The name landaulet was also used for the landaulet car body style, where the passengers are covered by a removable top and the chauffeur is usually covered and separated from passengers by a division.
- Leather quarter landau: early type with only half-hoods.
- Miniature landau: small, drawn by ponies.
- Rockaway landau: a cross between a landau and a Rockaway with a falling hood over the rear seats and a fixed top over the front passenger seat and driver seat; also Rockalet, Rockaway-Landaulet, or Landaulet-Rockaway for coupé versions.
Landaus

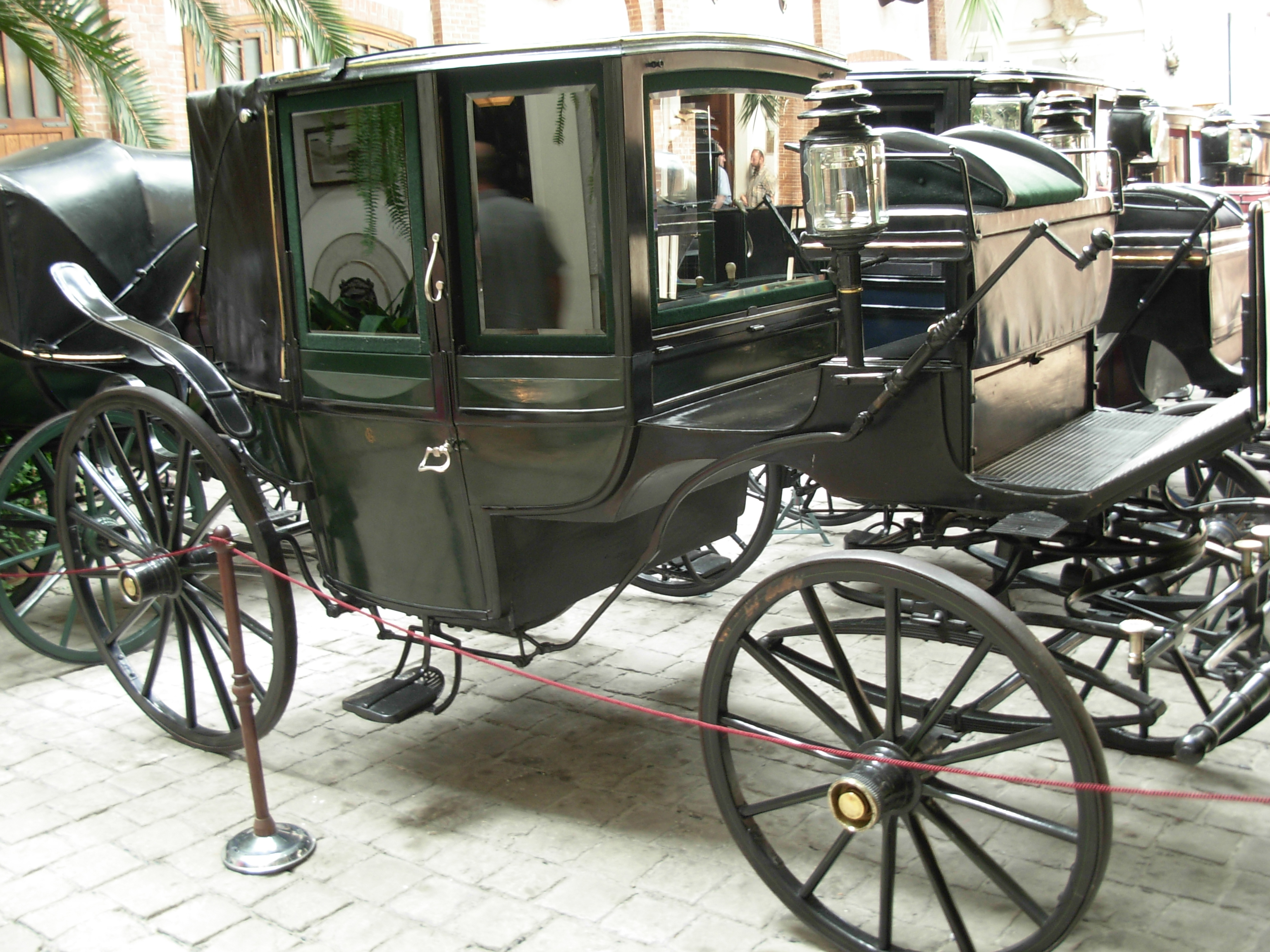
A five-glass landau

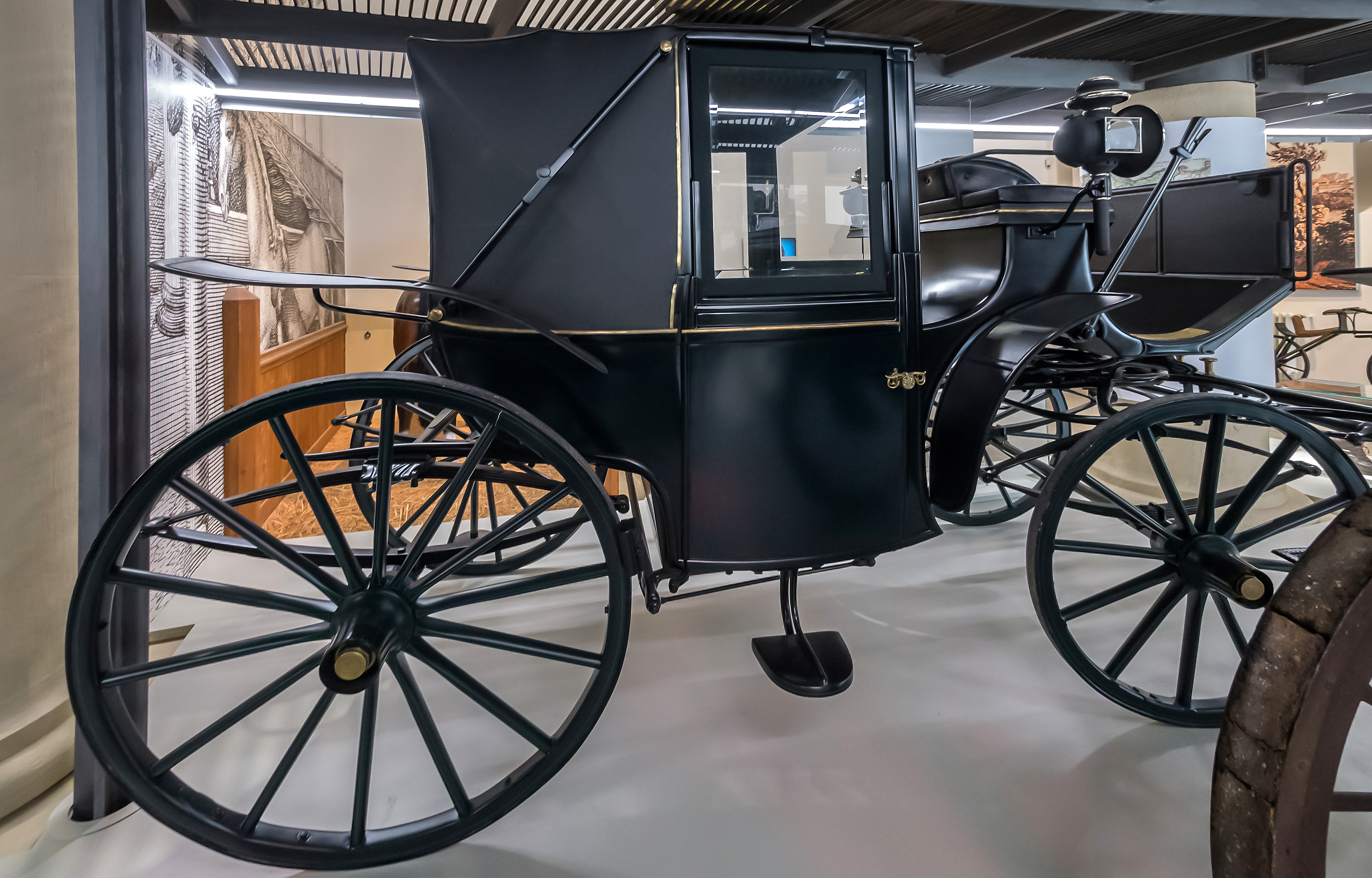
A landaulet

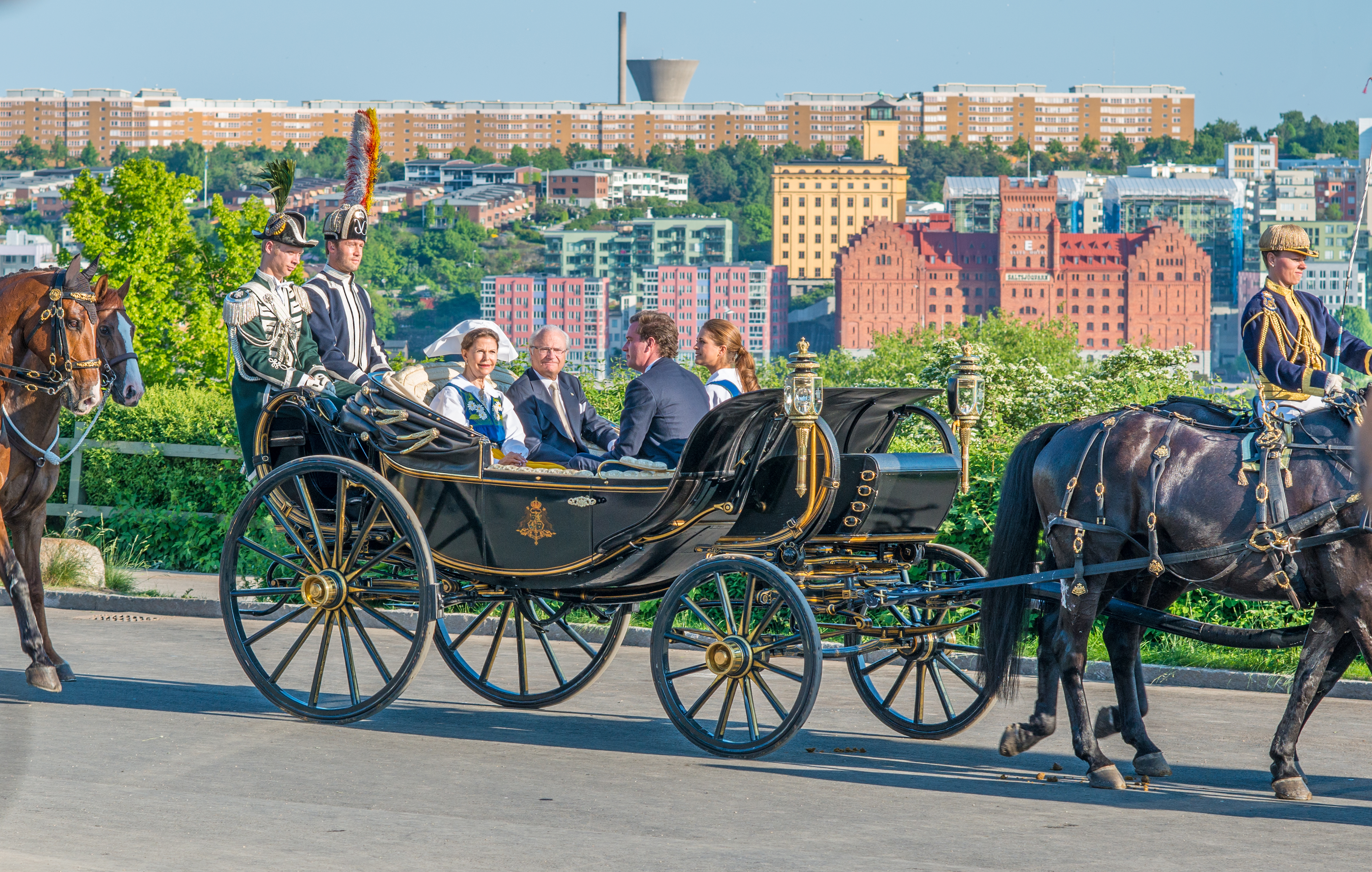
State landau in Sweden, 2013

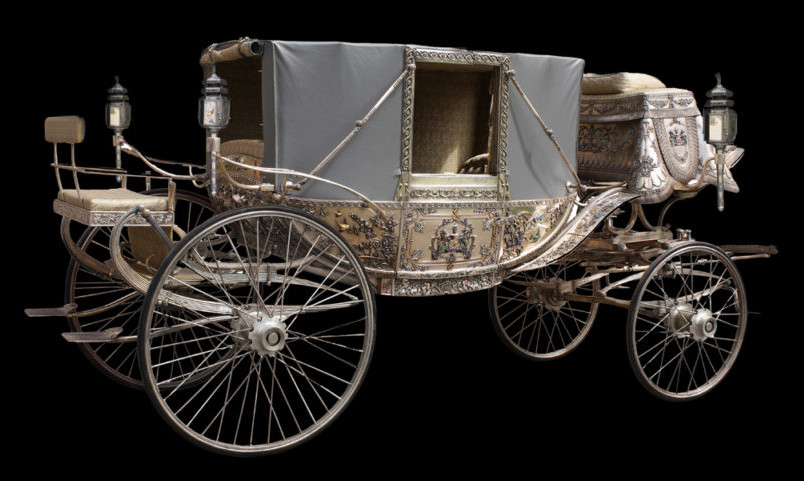
Unusual wire-spoke wheels on this 1915 Maharaja landau

== Historical context ==
The landau was invented in the 18th century; landau in this sense is first noted in English in 1743. It was named after Landau, Germany where they were first produced. Originally a very heavy carriage requiring four coach horses to pull it, there were many innovations over the decades to reduce its weight and allow two horses, then later a single horse to pull landau designs. This includes Luke Hopkinson, an English coachbuilder in Holborn, who in the 1830s introduced the Briska Landau, which led to subsequent improvements to the landau.

The landau reached its full development by the mid-19th century. It was purely a city carriage of luxury type. The low shell of the landau made for maximum visibility of the occupants and their clothing, a feature that makes a landau a popular choice for ceremonial occasions. According to Berkebile, "the Landau retained its popularity until around 1900, and was one of the last heavy carriages to pass from use. It was one of the most difficult carriages to build, and countless devices were invented to support and secure tops."

== Modern usage ==
Numerous countries have used landaus as their state coach. Some reside in museums and others have been meticulously maintained and are still used in parades and ceremonies. Landaus used as state coaches are often constructed with a removable driver's seat so they can be guided by postilion (riders) instead of a coachman.

=== Canada ===
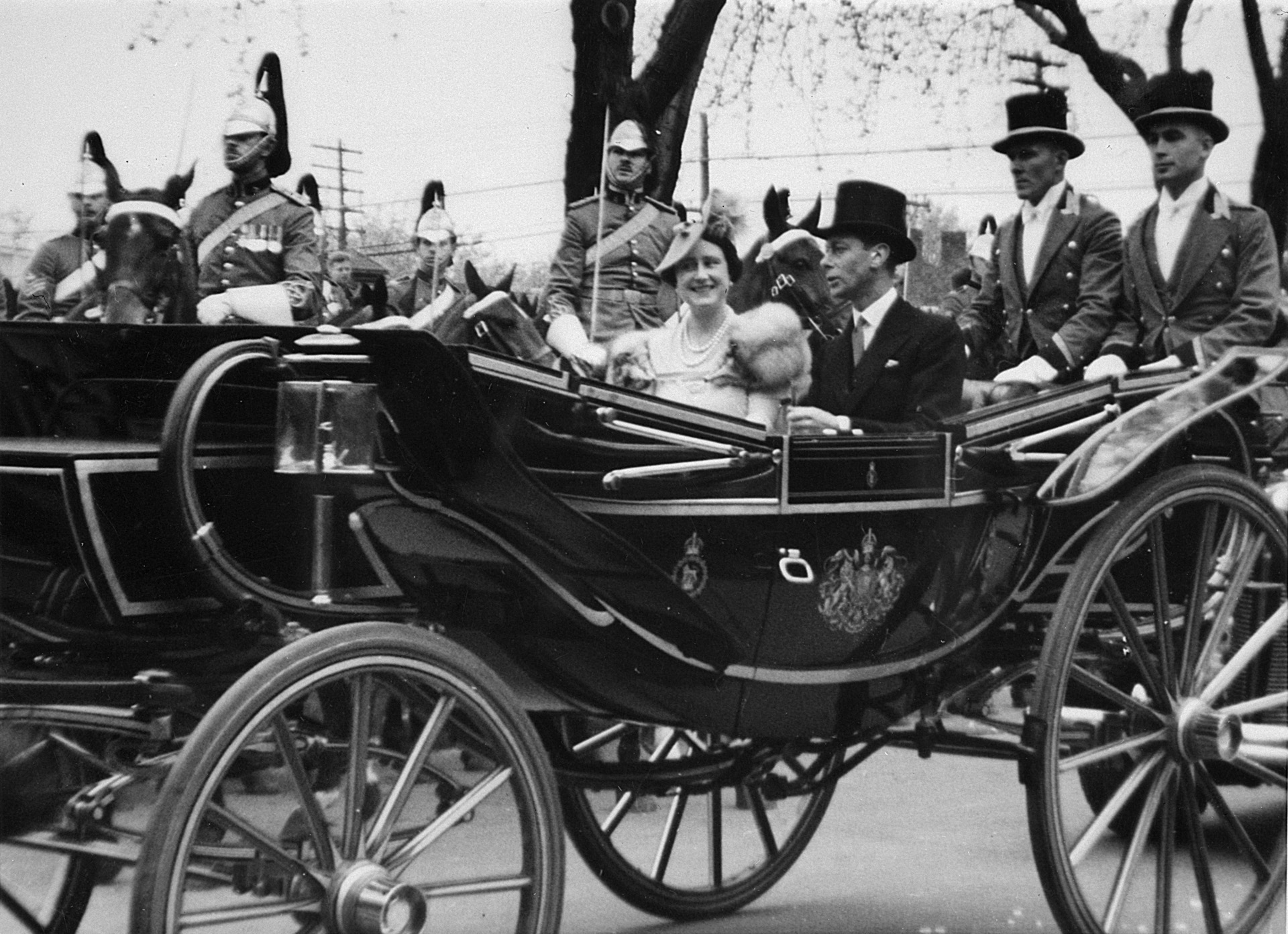
Canada's state landau in 1939

The Canadian State Landau was given to Canada in 1911, previously used by the Governor-General of Australia, and is used today in Ottawa for ceremonial processions from Rideau Hall to Parliament Hill. The Monarchy of Canada uses a private landau owned by the Ontario Jockey Club, a gift from E. P. Taylor, to attend the King's Plate horse races in Toronto.

=== Japan ===
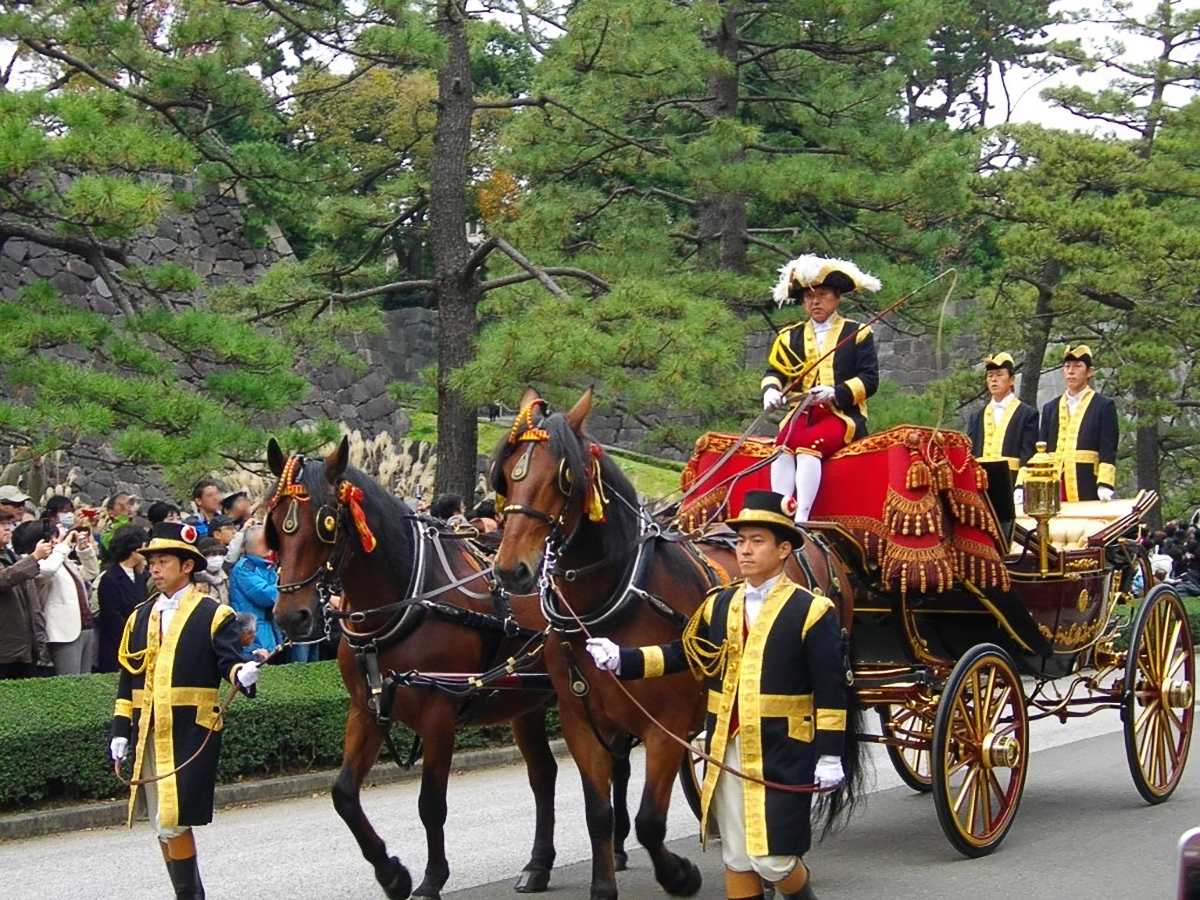
Japan 2009

A number of horse-drawn carriages, known in Japan as zagyoshiki, are maintained by the Imperial Household Agency and are regularly used when new ambassadors present their credentials to the Emperor of Japan, as well as for royal weddings and coronations.

=== United Kingdom ===
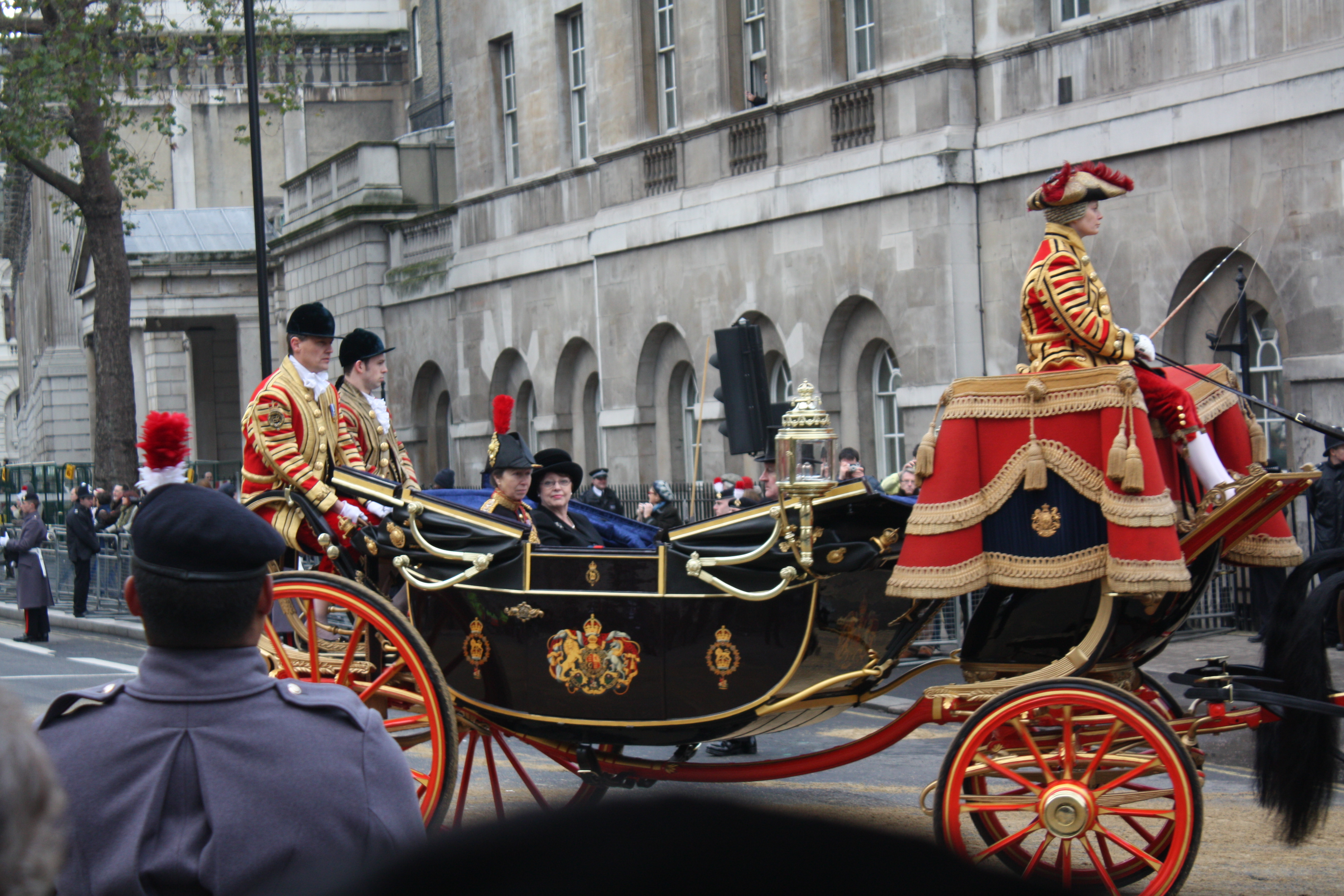
One of UK's state landaus, 2008

The Royal Mews maintains several different types of landau: several state landaus are in regular use (dating from between 1838 and 1872), plus five semi-state landaus, and several Ascot landaus. The semi-state landaus have less ornamentation, and livery is less elegant than full state livery. The Ascot landaus are lighter, have basket-work sides, and are used at the Royal Ascot. The 1902 State Postillion Landau was built for the coronation of Edward VII in 1902. The Royal Mews also retains a miniature landau made for the children of George V and designed to be pulled by ponies.

Landaus make for a striking display as long as the weather is fine, and they are used on occasions ranging from state visits and the State Opening of Parliament, to royal weddings, jubilees and other celebrations. They also play a regular part in the welcoming of new ambassadors to the Court of St James's: soon after arriving in London, foreign ambassadors have an audience with the monarch in which they present their Letters of Credence or Letters of High Commission. The ambassadors are collected from the embassy or residence by a state landau from the Royal Mews, and escorted by the Marshal of the Diplomatic Corps, who is based at St James's Palace. The ambassador's entourage follows in another state landau.
