= Killing for Love (film) =

- Film poster
- German: Das Versprechen
- Directed by: Marcus Vetter, Karin Steinberger
- Written by: Marcus Vetter, Karin Steinberger
- Produced by: Marcus Vetter, Louise Rosen, Ulf Meyer
- Starring: Jens Söring
- Cinematography: Georg Zengerling
- Edited by: Marcus Vetter
- Music by: Jens Huerkamp
- Production company: Filmperspektive
- Distributed by: Louise Rosen Ltd. (world sales)
- Release date: 27 October 2016 (Germany)
- Country: Germany
- Languages: English, German

Killing for Love (German: Das Versprechen, also known as The Promise) is a German documentary film directed by Marcus Vetter with Karin Steinberger. The film tells the crime story of the double murder of Derek and Nancy Haysom on 30 March 1985 in Bedford County, Virginia.

== Synopsis ==
The film focuses on the two main protagonists Jens Söring, son of a German diplomat, and Elizabeth Haysom, the daughter of the murdered couple. Both were sentenced to life in prison.

== Production ==
The film makes use of extensive original footage from press archives, as the two court cases were the first lawsuits to be broadcast nationwide on American television. In the film, these recordings from 1985 to 1990 are combined with scenes shot during the making of the film, including interviews with Jens Söring, witnesses, the investigators involved in the case, lawyers, prosecutors and journalists. In addition, extensive materials such as original crime scene photos and evidence, court transcripts, newspaper archives, love letters and diaries of the two main protagonists were evaluated in the film.

The film makes use of reenactments, featuring the voices of Daniel Brühl (as Söring) and Imogen Poots (as Haysom).

== Releases ==
The film premiered at the Munich International Film Festival and was released theatrically in October 2016.

The film had its North American premiere on 5 November 2016, at the Virginia Film Festival. Further festival screenings were planned at the Denver Film Festival and Doc NYC.

In the United Kingdom it was shown in March 2017 by the BBC, as part of their documentary strand Storyville, under the title Killing for Love.

In the Netherlands, public broadcaster NPO2 showed the film in two parts in its documentary series 2Doc in April 2017.

This film became the source material for a true crime podcast produced and narrated by Amanda Knox in 2019.
