= Fluvanna Correctional Center for Women =

Women's prison in Virginia, United States

- Interactive map of Fluvanna Correctional Center for Women
- Location: Route 250 West Troy, Virginia 22974; 37°59′4.8″N 78°16′12.1″W
- Status: Operational
- Security class: Level 3
- Capacity: 1,200
- Population: 1,199 (June 2008)
- Opened: April 1998
- Managed by: Virginia Department of Corrections
- Warden: Eric Aldridge

Fluvanna Correctional Center for Women is a prison operated by the Virginia Department of Corrections. It has a Troy postal address, and is in unincorporated Fluvanna County, about 55 miles (89 km) northwest of Richmond. The security level 3 facility housed 1,199 female inmates as of June 2008, including formerly housing the women's death row for the Commonwealth of Virginia.

== History ==
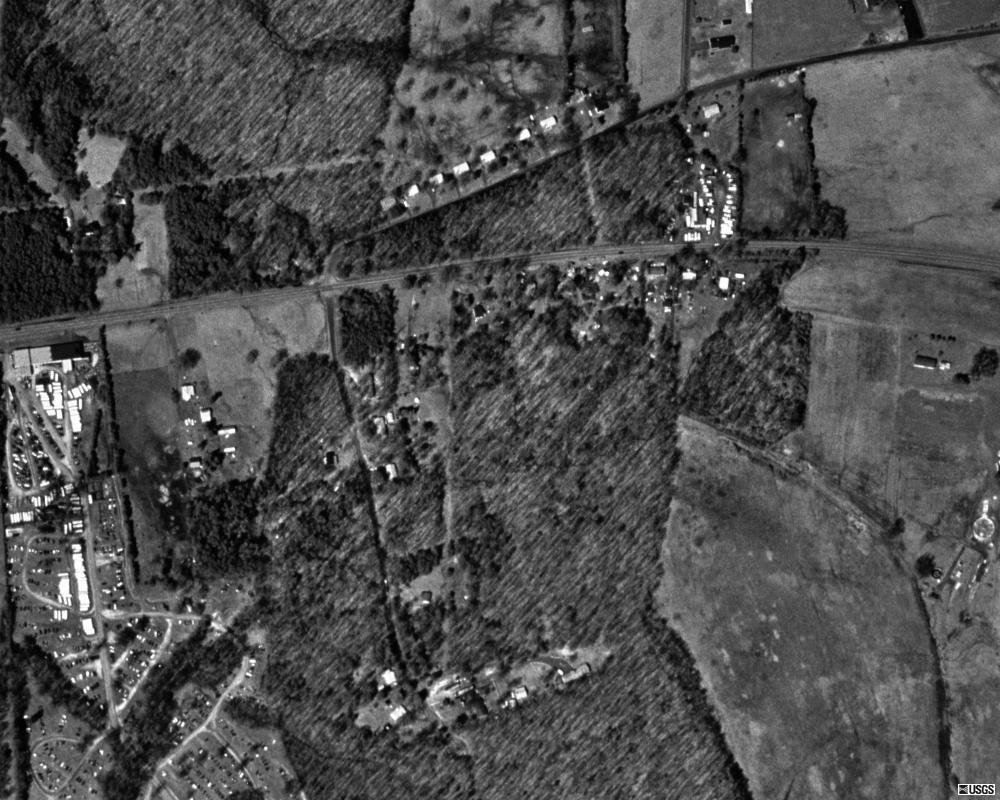
Future site in Fluvanna County, just to the south of U.S. Route 250 in 1994, four years before the prison was opened.

Fluvanna County became a candidate for a new women's prison after the Board of Supervisors of Bedford County rejected a 1992 proposal by the Virginia Department of Corrections for a new 600-inmate facility in Lynchburg, Virginia that would have created between 250 and 300 jobs. Construction began on 30 acres (12 ha) in Fluvanna along U.S. Route 250 in January 1996, with initial plans to open by August 1997.

Completed at a cost of $53.1 million, the correctional center was opened in April 1998, starting with about 800 prisoners. The facility is the second in the state dedicated to housing only female inmates, after the Virginia Correctional Center for Women in Goochland. The new prison was designed to accommodate 1,200 inmates and incorporated a 78,000 sq ft (7,200 m^{2}) medical facility on site to minimize the risk of escape. The perimeter was secured by electronic fences and patrols.

In December 1998, warden Patti Leigh Huffman refused to enforce a state order that banned cosmetics from the female prison population. The Virginia Department of Corrections was concerned about drugs being smuggled in makeup containers, but the prison was already equipped for detection of such contraband. Huffman stated, "If a woman wants to use cosmetics to make her feel better, then that's important.... Self-esteem is a core factor of every program at Fluvanna."

=== Investigations ===
In 1999, the American Civil Liberties Union investigated growing reports of sexual misconduct by the male prison staff upon the inmates. The corrections department stated that it would not consider any relationship between guards and inmates consensual under any circumstances. In June 2009, state senator Frank Ruff requested that the department investigate allegations that the correctional center denied access to religious services and profiled lesbian inmates for segregation.

== Death Row ==
Though the facility housed the death row for Virginia's female inmates prior to its abolition in 2021, executions by lethal injection were conducted at Greensville Correctional Center near Jarratt, Virginia, located to the south of Richmond. Teresa Lewis, the only woman held in Fluvanna's death row, was executed on September 23, 2010.

== Notable inmates ==
Inmate	Number	Status	Description
Teresa Lewis	321094	Executed September 23, 2010	Capital murder
Elizabeth Haysom	1122838	Released November 23, 2019	Accessory to murder before the fact
Clara Jane Schwartz	1130725		

== See also ==
- Capital punishment in Virginia
- List of Virginia state prisons
