= Elizabeth Haysom =

Canadian convicted felon

- Born: Elizabeth Roxanne Haysom; April 15, 1964 (age 62); Salisbury, Southern Rhodesia
- Parent(s): Derek William Reginald Haysom (deceased); Nancy Astor Benedict Haysom (deceased)
- Motive: Victims didn't approve of her relationship with Jens Söring over her own parents; Rage over mother's alleged sexual abuse of her (suspected)
- Conviction: Accessory before the fact to first degree murder (2 counts)
- Penalty: 90 years imprisonment

Details
- Victims: Derek William Haysom, 72; Nancy Astor Haysom, 53
- Date: March 30, 1985
- Country: United States
- State: Virginia
- Date apprehended: April 30, 1986
- Imprisoned at: Fluvanna Correctional Center for Women, Troy, Virginia, U.S.

Elizabeth Roxanne Haysom (born April 15, 1964) is a Canadian-American citizen who, along with her then boyfriend Jens Söring, was convicted of orchestrating the 1985 double murder of her parents Derek and Nancy Haysom in Bedford County, Virginia.

Haysom served 32 years of a 90-year prison sentence at the Fluvanna Correctional Center for Women in Troy, Virginia after pleading guilty to two counts of accessory to murder before the fact in 1987. She and Söring were paroled on November 25, 2019, more than 30 years after they were first convicted of the deaths of Haysom’s parents in 1985.

== Early life ==
Haysom was born in April 1964 in Salisbury, Southern Rhodesia (now Harare, Zimbabwe) to parents Nancy Astor Benedict Haysom, an American, who worked as an artist, and Derek William Reginald Haysom, originally from South Africa and a naturalized Canadian, who was a steel executive who served as president of two Nova Scotia crown corporations (Sydney Steel and Metropolitan Area Growth Investments). Derek and Nancy had a combined total of five children from previous marriages. Elizabeth attended boarding schools in Switzerland and England (Wycombe Abbey), then enrolled at the University of Virginia. It was there she met 18-year-old Jens Söring, a son of a West German diplomat, who quickly became her boyfriend.

== Murders ==
On the morning of April 3, 1985, when Söring was 18 and Haysom was 20, the bodies of Derek and Nancy Haysom were discovered. They had been slashed and stabbed to death in their home in the Boonsboro section of Bedford County, just outside of Lynchburg, Virginia. Both Derek and Nancy were almost decapitated. The couple's bodies were not discovered until days after the murder. During the timeline of the murder, Haysom had rented a car. She and Jens drove to Washington, D.C., to establish an alibi.

== Flight to England ==
Haysom and Söring were not initially suspects in the Haysoms' murders, and Haysom organized all the details for her parents' funerals. Within a few weeks, authorities had checked the records for the rental car the pair used and found that the total mileage during the rental far exceeded the single round trip to Washington, D.C., that they claimed to have taken. The Virginia police turned their focus to the couple, who then fled the country. Six months after the murder, having been to a number of countries, Söring and Haysom went to England, where they were arrested on April 30, 1986.

== Convictions ==
In 1987, Haysom, then 23 years old, pleaded guilty to two counts of accessory to murder before the fact and was sentenced to 90 years in prison – one 45-year sentence for each murder, to be served consecutively. Söring pleaded not guilty but was found guilty at his 1990 trial and sentenced to two consecutive life terms for first-degree murder.

Haysom, incarcerated in the Fluvanna Correctional Center for Women in Troy, Virginia, first became eligible for parole in 1995, and submitted a parole request every three years thereafter. Haysom's sentence was subject to mandatory parole; she would have been released automatically in 2032, 45 years after her conviction. During an interview in 2016, Haysom said Söring had killed her parents in a rage after learning that her mother had sexually abused her. Söring had contended that Haysom killed her parents on her own over the abuse, albeit she originally denied that any such abuse had occurred. In the same interview, Haysom said she was "profoundly ashamed" of her role in the murders of her parents and criticized Söring for maintaining his innocence.

== Parole ==
On November 25, 2019, Virginia Governor Ralph Northam announced that both Haysom and Söring would be released, but not pardoned. Haysom has Canadian citizenship through her father and, on January 22, 2020, was deported to Canada. Söring was deported to his home country of Germany.

U.S. Representative Ben Cline issued a statement condemning her release as a cost-cutting attempt by the state of Virginia and not based on merit. Adrianne L. Bennett, then chair of the Virginia Parole Board, asserted that the decision to grant Haysom and Söring parole was also justified by their young age at the time the crime was committed.

== In the media ==
The Haysoms' murders have been profiled by 20/20, The Investigators, Geraldo Rivera, The New Detectives, City Confidential, Wicked Attraction, Deadly Women, On the Case with Paula Zahn, Snapped: Killer Couples, and Southern Fried Homicide.

Killing for Love (a.k.a. The Promise), a feature documentary film, premiered at the Munich International Film Festival and was released theatrically in October 2016.

Till Murder Do Us Part: Soering vs. Haysom, a four-episode true crime documentary limited series, was released on Netflix on November 1, 2023.
