= Death row phenomenon =

Emotional distress often felt by prisoners on death row

Death row phenomenon is the emotional distress felt by prisoners on death row. Concerns about the ethics of inflicting distress upon prisoners have led to legal scrutiny about the constitutionality of the death penalty in the United States and other countries. In relation to the use of solitary confinement with death row inmates, death row phenomenon and death row syndrome are two concepts that have gained significant recognition. Death row phenomenon is the harmful effect of death row conditions, while death row syndrome is the manifestation of psychological illness that can occur as a result.

== Phenomenon ==
Death row syndrome is a psychological disorder that inmates on death row can go through when they are put in isolation. According to some psychiatrists, the consequences of being confined to death row for an extended period of time, including the effects of having the knowledge one will be killed and the subsequent living conditions, can lead to extreme manifestations of mental distress, such as delusions and suicidal tendencies in an individual. Prisoners wait years for execution on death row and while waiting the prisoners go through isolation. Living in this kind of condition can aggravate the effects of isolation. Most of the inmates stay in their cells for more than twenty hours a day. This kind of isolation and waiting for execution causes many inmates to die naturally.

The suicide rate of death row inmates was found by Lester and Tartaro to be 113 per 100,000 in the period between 1976 and 1999. This is about ten times the rate of suicide in the United States as a whole and about six times the rate of suicide in the general U.S. prison population.

Since the re-institution of the American death penalty in 1976 to January 1, 2017, 145 prisoners have waived their appeals and asked that the execution be carried out; most notably, the case of Gary Gilmore in Utah brought the ten-year national moratorium to a halt following Gregg v. Georgia. In the post-Furman era, four states (Connecticut, New Mexico, Oregon, and Pennsylvania) have executed only volunteers.

The theory of the death row phenomenon may be traced to 1989, when the European Court of Human Rights agreed that poor conditions on death row in Virginia should mean that a fugitive should not be extradited to the US unless the US agreed it would not execute the fugitive if the individual were convicted. Additionally, the number of years that the fugitive would be on death row was considered problematic. The case is known as Soering v. United Kingdom. Earlier, however, in 1950, a justice of the United States Supreme Court, in Solesbee v. Balkcom, remarked that the onset of insanity while awaiting execution of a death sentence is not a rare phenomenon. Often, the death row phenomenon, being a result of a prolonged stay on death row, is an unintentional result of the long procedures used in the attempt to ensure the death penalty is applied only to the guilty.

== Legal ramifications ==
As of 2005, arguments about the death row phenomenon have never been successful in avoiding the death penalty for any person in the United States. When serial killer Michael Bruce Ross agreed to be executed in 2005, his decision caused controversy over whether he could legally agree to such a thing, as the death row phenomenon might have contributed to his decision.

United States Supreme Court Justices opposing the death penalty, such as John Paul Stevens and Stephen Breyer, have at multiple times argued in their dissents that the delay and waiting on death row was a factor making capital punishment unconstitutional as a cruel and unusual punishment. Their views were rejected by concurring opinions from more conservative justices such as Antonin Scalia and Clarence Thomas, who said that this long delay was caused by the convicts themselves because of their repeated appeals and by Justices opposed to the death penalty.

== See also ==
- Death anxiety
- Death row
- List of United States death row inmates
