= Rockaway Beach =

Rockaway Beach may refer to:

- "Rockaway Beach" (song), by the Ramones
- Rockaway Beach, California
- Rockaway Beach, Missouri
- Rockaway Beach, Oregon
- Rockaway Beach, Wisconsin
- Rockaway Beach, Queens, New York City
  - Rockaway Beach and Boardwalk, beach in Queens
