= Troy, Virginia =

Unincorporated community in Virginia, United States

- Unincorporated community
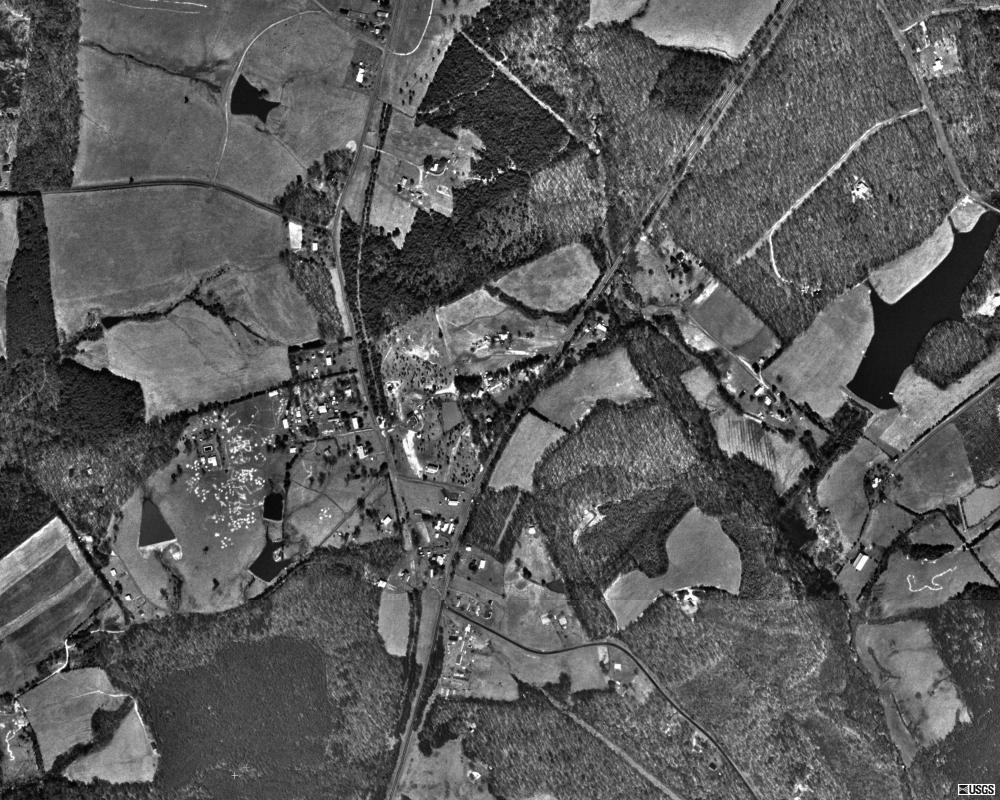
- Aerial photo of Troy in 1994

- Location within the Commonwealth of Virginia Troy (the United States)
- Coordinates: 37.951°N 78.246°W
- Country: United States
- State: Virginia
- County: Fluvanna
- Original name: Clarkland
- Renamed: c. May 1908
- Elevation: 409 ft (125 m)

Population (2010)
  - Total: 3,954
- Time zone: UTC−5 (Eastern (EST))
  - Summer (DST): UTC−4 (EDT)
- ZIP codes: 22974
- Area code: 434

Troy is an unincorporated community in Fluvanna County, Virginia, United States. It lies just west of U.S. Route 15, between Zion Crossroads to the north and the county seat of Palmyra to the south. Troy's existence was defined by the Virginia Air Line Railway, which operated from 1908 to 1975. In 1998, the Virginia Department of Corrections opened the Fluvanna Correctional Center for Women in the area.

== History ==
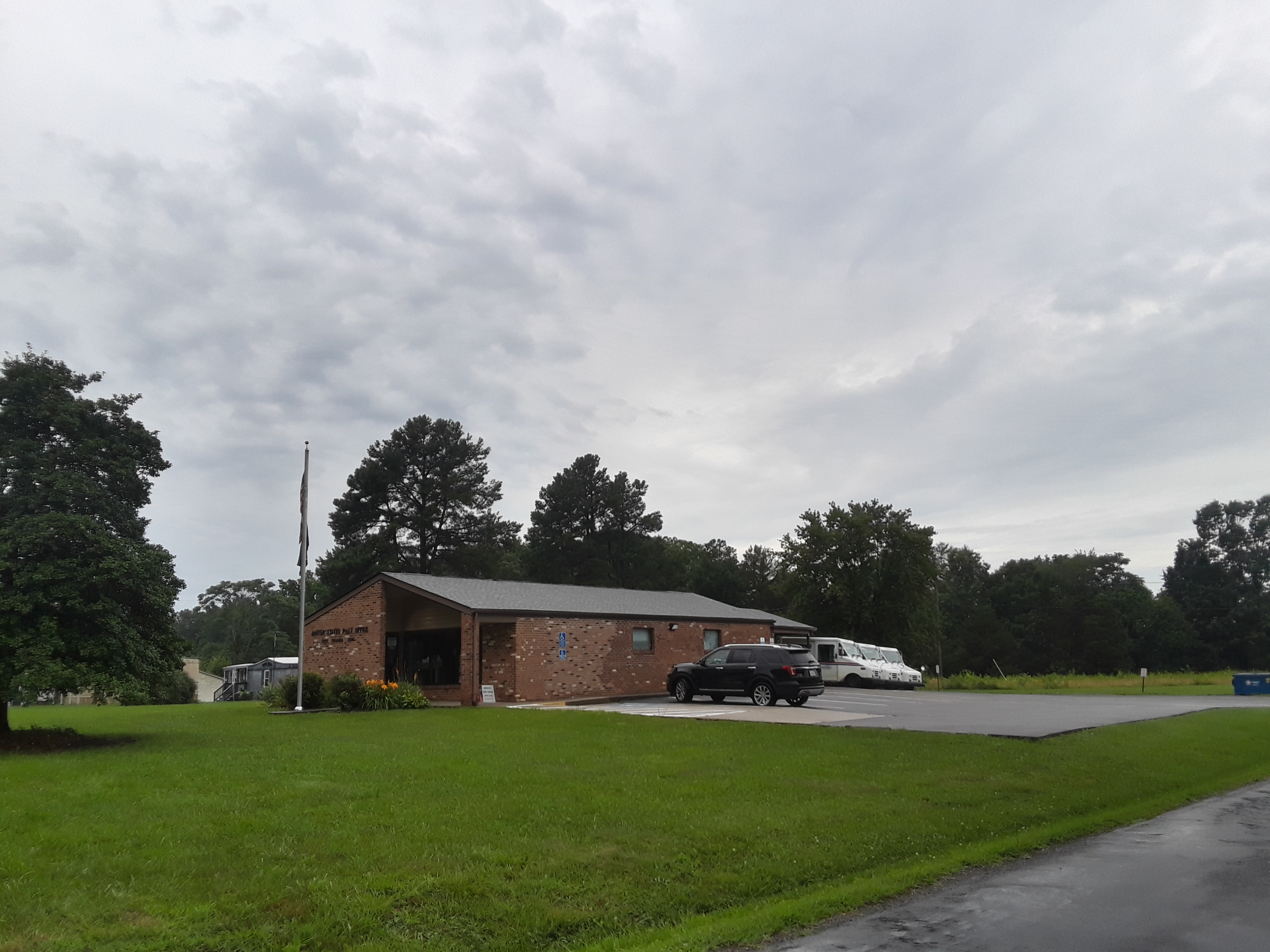
Troy, Virginia post office in July 2023

Previously called Clarksland, the location is named after "Captain" T. O. Troy, president of the now-defunct Virginia Air Line Railway. When construction on the rail line to connect Lindsay and Strathmore began in October 1906, the railway stop in Clarkland consisted of little more than a shed. Around May 1908, Troy built a full rail agency station in the community to become the cornerstone of the area's prosperity. The agency shared a building with the town general store, operated by James Hasher. The railroad was completed and began operating in October 1908. However, rail service was reduced to one daily train by 1927 and ended in 1954. The growing adoption of automobiles and airplanes had been taking business away from railroads since the 1930s. On October 26, 1971, the Fluvanna Board of Supervisors unsuccessfully sued the Chesapeake and Ohio Railway to keep the railway in operation; it was abandoned in November 1975. The store was deserted, leaving the graves of the Hasher family next to it.

=== Post-railway years ===
In 1998, the Fluvanna Correctional Center for Women was built by the Virginia Department of Corrections in an unincorporated area near Troy. The location in Fluvanna County became a candidate for the new women's prison after the Board of Supervisors of Bedford County, Virginia rejected a 1992 proposal for a facility that would have created between 250 and 300 jobs.

== Location and demographics ==
Troy can be accessed from U.S. Route 15, just south of Zion Crossroads. The community lies to the east of U.S. Route 15 along Fluvanna County Road 631, also known as Troy Road. Troy is part of the Charlottesville metropolitan area.

The Troy post office serves the local ZIP Code of 22974 as well as communities in the neighboring counties of Albemarle, Louisa, and Orange. The area within the Zip code (which includes the correctional center) was populated by 1,530 men and 2,424 women in 2010. The median ages of the men and women were 37.2 and 36.3, respectively. The average home value was $105,000 and the average annual household income was $54,396.
