= Rockaway Avenue =

Rockaway Avenue is a street located in Brooklyn, New York. It is also the name of two current New York City Subway stations and one closed station:

- Rockaway Avenue (IND Fulton Street Line), serving the A and C trains
- Rockaway Avenue (IRT New Lots Line), serving the 2, 3, 4, and 5 trains
- Rockaway Avenue (BMT Fulton Street Line), the former elevated station; now demolished
