= Rockaway, Virginia =

Unincorporated community in Virginia, United States

Coordinates: 37°51′06″N 78°15′50″W

Rockaway is an unincorporated community in Fluvanna County, in the U.S. state of Virginia.
