= Lindsay, Virginia =

Unincorporated community in Virginia, United States

Lindsay
- Unincorporated community
- Location within the Commonwealth of Virginia Lindsay (the United States)
- Coordinates: 38°05′17″N 78°14′47″W
- Country: United States
- State: Virginia
- County: Albemarle
- Time zone: UTC−5 (Eastern (EST))
  - Summer (DST): UTC−4 (EDT)
- GNIS feature ID: 1493202

Lindsay is an unincorporated community in Albemarle County, Virginia, United States.

== Numbered Highways ==
SR 615 (Lidnsay Road)

== Railways ==
Washington Subdivision
