= Rockaway (carriage) =

Horse-drawn vehicle

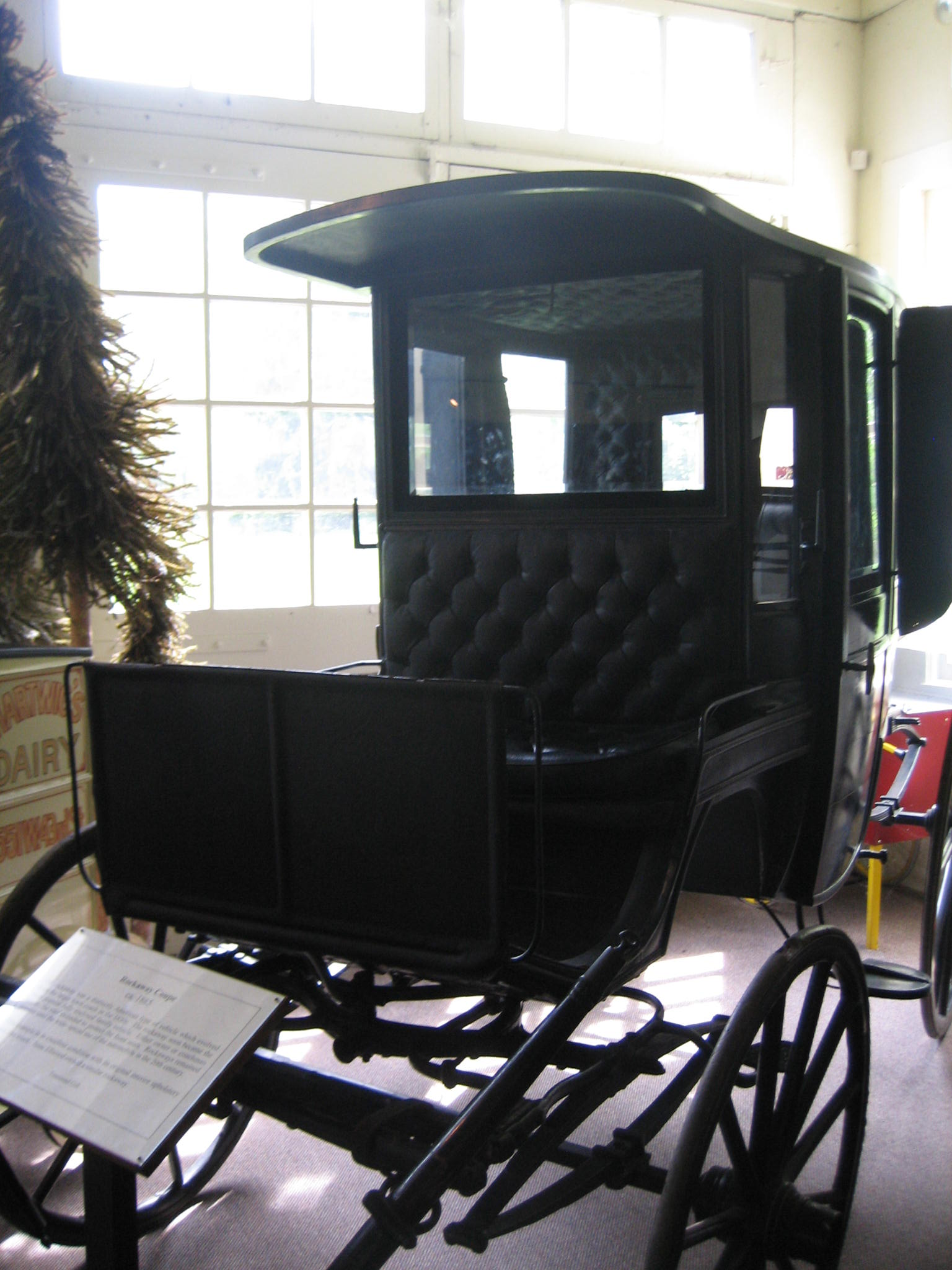
A Rockaway carriage at a museum in Illinois

Rockaway is a term applied to two types of carriage: a light, low, United States four-wheel carriage with a fixed top and open sides that may be covered by waterproof curtains, and a heavy carriage enclosed at sides and rear, with a door on each side. The name may be derived from the town of Rockaway, New Jersey, where carriages were originally made. It is featured in Herman Melville’s short story "Bartleby" as the narrator's mode of transport while avoiding the landlords and tenants looking for help in kicking Bartleby out.

But the Long Island Museum of Art, American History and Carriages, located in Stony Brook, New York, has a different explanation of the name. According to the Museum, the carriage was designed and built in Jamaica, Queens—a major hub for New York City residents traveling to Long Island for recreation—and was called the Rockaway because it was used to shuttle passengers between Jamaica and the Atlantic Ocean beaches of Long Island's Rockaway Peninsula.
