= Yorktown campaign =

1781 military campaign of the American Revolutionary War

- Part of the Southern theater of the American Revolutionary War
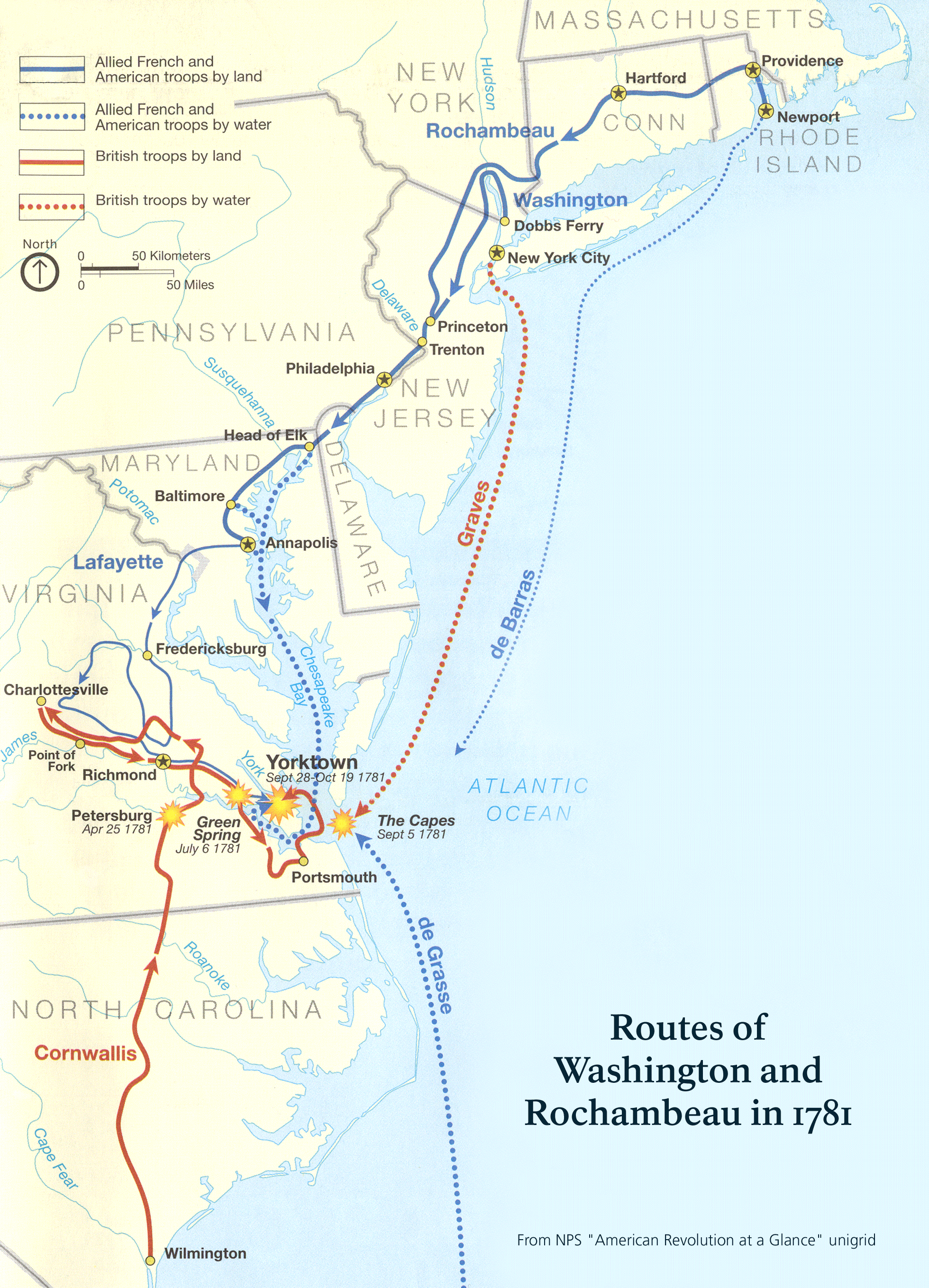
Date	June – October 1781
Location	Atlantic Seaboard
Result	Franco-American victory

Belligerents
United States; France	Great Britain: Hesse-Cassel (Note: Following the German spelling reform of the early 20th century, the town of Cassel became Kassel, long after the dissolution of Hesse-Kassel itself.); Ansbach-Bayreuth

Commanders and leaders
(United States) George Washington (United States) Marquis de Lafayette (United States) Anthony Wayne (United States) Benjamin Lincoln (Kingdom of France) Comte de Rochambeau (Kingdom of France) Comte de Grasse (Kingdom of France) Charles Destouches (Kingdom of France) Comte de Barras (Kingdom of France) Comte de Deux-Ponts	(Kingdom of Great Britain) Henry Clinton (Kingdom of Great Britain) Charles Cornwallis (surrendered) (Kingdom of Great Britain) Charles O'Hara (surrendered) (Kingdom of Great Britain) Benedict Arnold (surrendered) (Kingdom of Great Britain) William Phillips †; Mariot Arbuthnot; Thomas Graves; Thomas Symonds (surrendered); August von Salzburg (surrendered)

Strength
American land forces: 5,500, sixty cannon French land forces: 9,500, ninety cannon French navy: 36 ships of the line French naval personnel: 20–22,000	Cornwallis land forces: 7,000; Clinton land forces: 7,000; New York fleet: 25 ships of the line Yorktown fleet: 63 small ships (Note: Greene notes that 32 of these ships were unserviceable and sunk by the French after the surrender, and that only six were armed.)
- Force strengths are maximums marshalled during and shortly after the siege of Yorktown.

The Yorktown campaign, also known as the Virginia campaign, was a series of military maneuvers and battles during the American Revolutionary War that culminated in the siege of Yorktown in October 1781. The result of the campaign was the surrender of the British Army force of General Charles Cornwallis, an event that led directly to the beginning of serious peace negotiations and the eventual end of the war. The campaign was marked by disagreements, indecision, and miscommunication on the part of British leaders, and by a remarkable set of cooperative decisions, at times in violation of orders, by the French and Americans.

The campaign involved land and naval forces of Great Britain and France, and land forces of the United States. British forces were sent to Virginia between January and April 1781 and joined with Cornwallis's army in May, which came north from an extended campaign through the southern states. These forces were first opposed weakly by Virginia militia, but General George Washington sent first Marquis de Lafayette and then "Mad" Anthony Wayne with Continental Army troops to oppose the raiding and economic havoc the British were wreaking. The combined American forces, however, were insufficient in number to oppose the combined British forces, and it was only after a series of controversially confusing orders by General Sir Henry Clinton, the British commander-in-chief, that Cornwallis moved to Yorktown in July and built a defensive position that was strong against the land forces he then faced, but was vulnerable to naval blockade and siege.

British naval forces in North America and the West Indies were weaker than the combined fleets of France and Spain, and, after some critical decisions and tactical missteps by British naval commanders, the French fleet of Paul de Grasse gained control over Chesapeake Bay, blockading Cornwallis from naval support and delivering additional land forces to blockade him on land. The Royal Navy attempted to dispute this control, but Admiral Thomas Graves was defeated in the key Battle of the Chesapeake on September 5. American and French armies that had massed outside New York City began moving south in late August, and arrived near Yorktown in mid-September. Deceptions about their movement successfully delayed attempts by Clinton to send more troops to Cornwallis.

The siege of Yorktown began on September 28, 1781. In a step that probably shortened the siege, Cornwallis decided to abandon parts of his outer defenses, and the besiegers successfully stormed two of his redoubts. When it became clear that his position was untenable, Cornwallis opened negotiations on October 17 and surrendered two days later. When the news reached London, the government of Lord North fell, and the following Rockingham ministry entered into peace negotiations. These culminated in the Treaty of Paris in 1783, in which King George III recognized the independent United States of America. Clinton and Cornwallis engaged in a public war of words defending their roles in the campaign, and British naval command also discussed the navy's shortcomings that led to the defeat.

== Background ==
By December 1780, the American Revolutionary War's North American theatres had reached a critical point. The Continental Army had suffered major defeats earlier in the year, with its southern armies either captured or dispersed in the loss of Charleston and the Battle of Camden in the south, while the armies of George Washington and the British commander-in-chief for North America, Sir Henry Clinton watched each other around New York City in the north. The national currency was virtually worthless, public support for the war, about to enter its sixth year, was waning, and army troops were becoming mutinous over pay and conditions. In the Americans' favor, provincial recruiting in the south had been checked with a severe blow at Kings Mountain in October.

=== French and American planning for 1781 ===
Virginia had largely escaped military notice before 1779, when the British Chesapeake raid destroyed much of the state's shipbuilding capacity and seized or destroyed large amounts of tobacco, which was a significant trade item for the Americans. Virginia's only defenses consisted of locally raised militia companies, and a naval force that had been virtually wiped out in the 1779 raid. The militia were under the overall direction of Continental Army General Baron von Steuben, a prickly Prussian taskmaster who, although he was an excellent drillmaster, alienated not only his subordinates, but also had a difficult relationship with the state's governor, Thomas Jefferson. Steuben had established a training center in Chesterfield for new Continental Army recruits, and a "factory" in Westham for the manufacture and repair of weapons and ammunition.

French military planners had to balance competing demands for the 1781 campaign. After a series of unsuccessful attempts at cooperation with the Americans (leading to failed assaults on Newport, Rhode Island, and Savannah, Georgia), they realized more active participation in North America was needed. However, they also needed to coordinate their actions with Spain, where there was potential interest in making an assault on the British stronghold of Jamaica. It turned out that the Spanish were not interested in operations against Jamaica until after they had dealt with an expected British attempt to reinforce besieged Gibraltar, and merely wanted to be informed of the movements of the West Indies fleet.

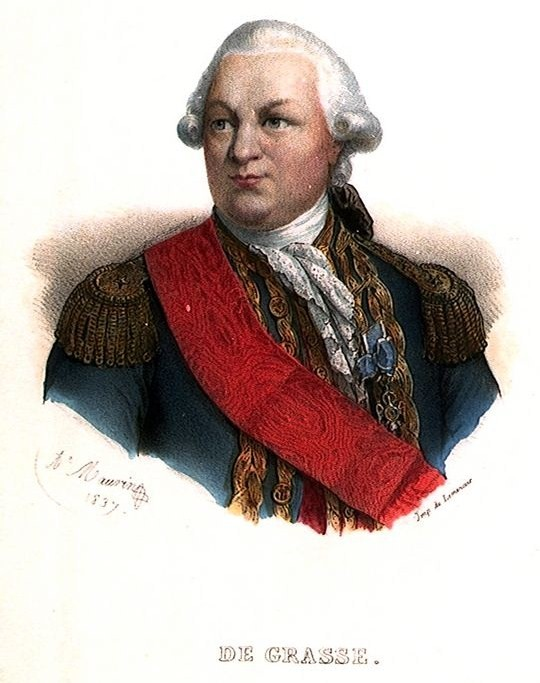
Comte de Grasse

As the French fleet was preparing to depart Brest in March, several important decisions were made. The West Indies fleet, led by the Comte de Grasse, after operations in the Windward Islands, was directed to go to Cap-Français (present-day Cap-Haïtien) to determine what resources would be required to assist Spanish operations. Due to a lack of transports, France also promised six million livres to support the American war effort instead of providing additional troops. The French fleet at Newport was given a new commander, the Comte de Barras. De Barras was ordered to take the Newport fleet to harass British shipping off Nova Scotia and Newfoundland, and the French army at Newport was ordered to combine with Washington's army outside New York. In orders that were deliberately not fully shared with General Washington, De Grasse was instructed to assist in North American operations after his stop at Cap-Français. The French general, the Comte de Rochambeau was instructed to tell Washington that de Grasse might be able to assist, without making any commitment. (Washington learned from John Laurens, stationed in Paris, that de Grasse had discretion to come north.)

The French fleet sailed from Brest on March 22. The British fleet was busy with preparations to resupply Gibraltar, and did not attempt to oppose the departure. After the French fleet sailed, the packet ship Concorde sailed for Newport, carrying the Comte de Barras, Rochambeau's orders, and credits for the six million livres. In a separate dispatch sent later, de Grasse also made two important requests. The first was that he be notified at Cap-Français of the situation in North America so that he could decide how he might be able to assist in operations there, and the second was that he be supplied with 30 pilots familiar with North American waters.

=== British planning for 1781 ===
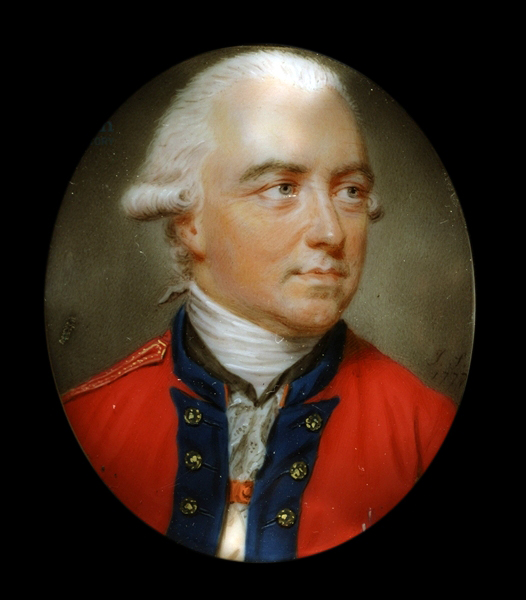
General Sir Henry Clinton

Clinton never articulated a coherent vision for what the goals for British operations of the coming campaign season should be in the early months of 1781. Part of his problem lay in a difficult relationship with his naval counterpart in New York, the aging Vice Admiral Marriot Arbuthnot. Both men were stubborn, prone to temper, and had prickly personalities; due to repeated clashes, their working relationship had completely broken down. In the fall of 1780 Clinton had requested that either he or Arbuthnot be recalled; however, orders recalling Arbuthnot did not arrive until June. Until then, according to historian George Billias, "The two men could not act alone, and would not act together". Arbuthnot was replaced by Sir Thomas Graves, with whom Clinton had a somewhat better working relationship.

The British presence in the south consisted of the strongly fortified ports of Savannah, Georgia and Charleston, South Carolina, and a string of outposts in the interior of those two states. Although the strongest outposts were relatively immune to attack from the Patriot militia that were their only formal opposition in those states, the smaller outposts, as well as supply convoys and messengers, were often the target of militia commanders like Thomas Sumter and Francis Marion. Portsmouth had most recently been occupied in October 1780 by a force under the command of Major General Alexander Leslie, but Lieutenant General Charles, Earl Cornwallis, commanding the British southern army, had ordered them to South Carolina in November. To replace General Leslie at Portsmouth, General Clinton sent 1,600 troops under General Benedict Arnold (recently commissioned into the British Army as a brigadier) to Virginia in late December.

== British raiding in Virginia ==
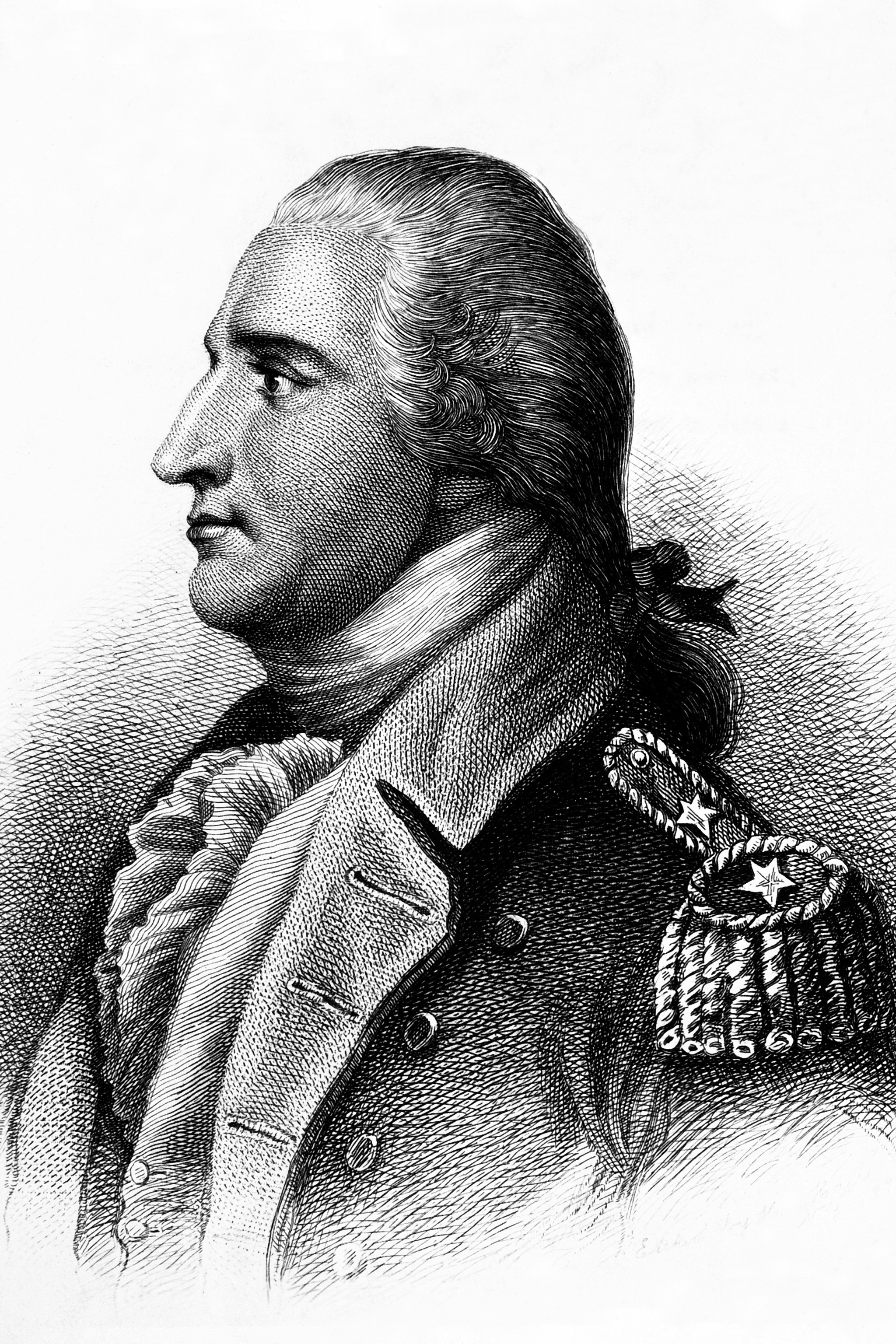
Benedict Arnold

Part of the fleet carrying General Arnold and his troops arrived in Chesapeake Bay on December 30, 1780. Without waiting for the rest of the transports to arrive, Arnold sailed up the James River and disembarked 900 troops at Westover, Virginia, on January 4. After an overnight forced march, he raided Richmond, the state capital, the next day, encountering only minimal militia resistance. After two more days of raiding in the area, they returned to their boats, and made sail for Portsmouth. Arnold established fortifications there, and sent his men out on raiding and foraging expeditions. The local militia were called out, but they were in such small numbers that the British presence could not be disputed. This did not prevent raiding expeditions from running into opposition, as some did in skirmishing at Waters Creek in March.

When news of Arnold's activities reached George Washington, he decided that a response was necessary. He wanted the French to send a naval expedition from their base in Newport, but the commanding admiral, Chevalier Destouches, refused any assistance until he received reports of serious storm damage to part of the British fleet on January 22. On February 9, Captain Arnaud de Gardeur de Tilley sailed from Newport with three ships (ship of the line Eveille and frigates Surveillante and Gentile). When he arrived off Portsmouth four days later, Arnold withdrew his ships, which had shallower drafts than those of the French, up the Elizabeth River, where de Tilley could not follow. De Tilley, after determining that the local militia were "completely insufficient" to attack Arnold's position, returned to Newport. On the way he captured HMS Romulus, a frigate sent by the British from New York to investigate his movements.

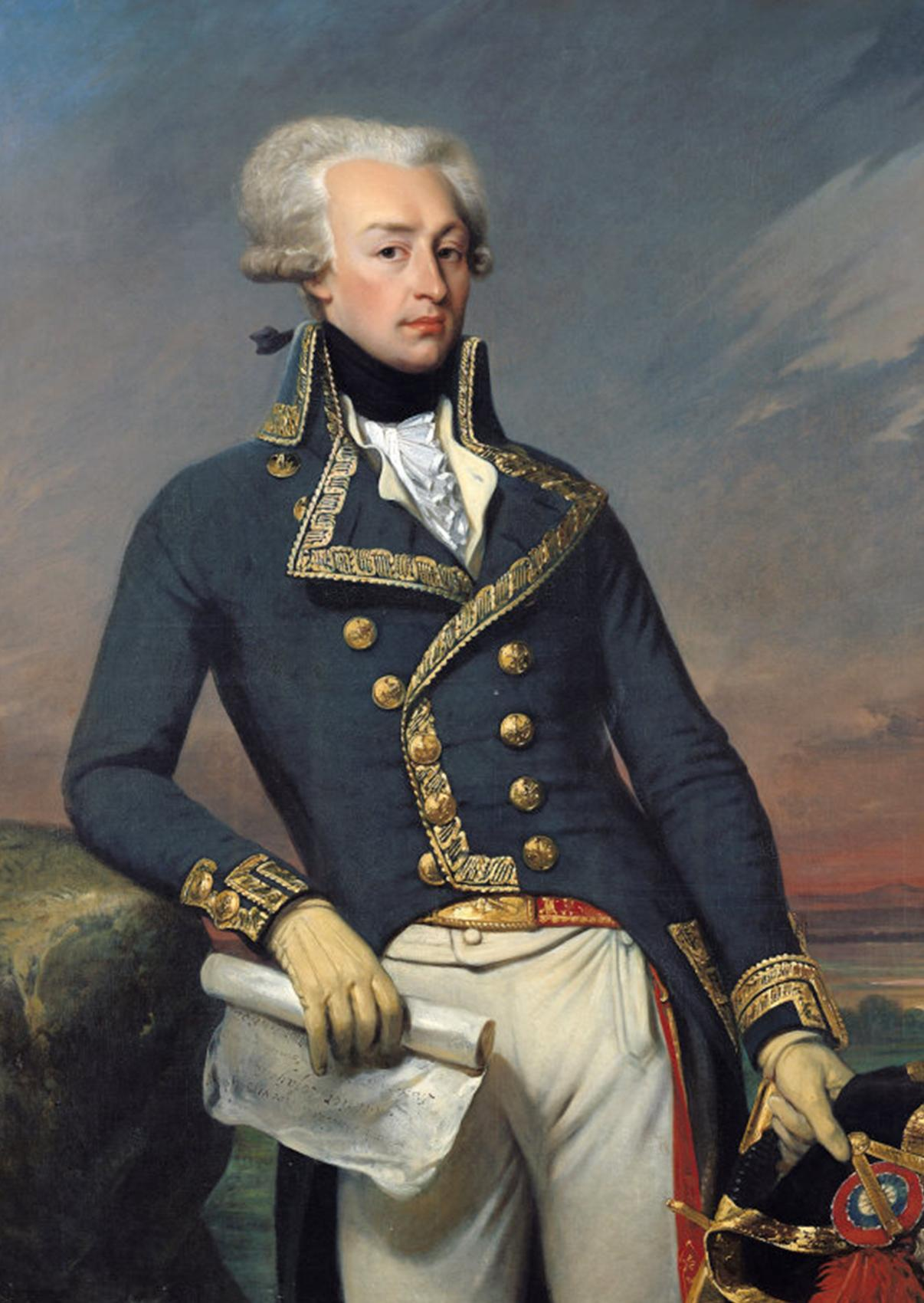
The Marquis de Lafayette

Congress authorised a detachment of Continental forces to Virginia on February 20. Washington assigned command of the expedition to the Marquis de Lafayette, who left Peekskill, New York the same day. His troops, numbering about 1,200, were three light regiments drawn from troops assigned to Continental regiments from New Jersey and New England; these regiments were led by Joseph Vose, Francis Barber, and Jean-Joseph Sourbader de Gimat. Lafayette's force reached Head of Elk (present-day Elkton, Maryland, the northern navigable limit of Chesapeake Bay) on March 3. While awaiting transportation for his troops at Annapolis, Lafayette traveled south, reaching Yorktown on March 14, to assess the situation.

=== American attempts at defense ===
De Tilley's expedition, and the strong encouragement of General Washington, who traveled to Newport to press the case, convinced Destouches to make a larger commitment. On March 8 he sailed with his entire fleet (7 ships of the line and several frigates, including the recently captured Romulus), carrying French troops to join with Lafayette's in Virginia. Admiral Arbuthnot, alerted to his departure, sailed on March 10 after sending Arnold a dispatch warning of the French movement. Arbuthnot, whose copper-clad ships could sail faster than those of Destouches, reached Cape Henry on March 16, just ahead of the French fleet. The ensuing battle was largely indecisive, but left Arbuthnot free to enter Lynnhaven Bay and control access to Chesapeake Bay; Destouches returned to Newport. Lafayette saw the British fleet, and pursuant to orders, made preparations to return his troops to the New York area. By early April he had returned to Head of Elk, where he received orders from Washington to stay in Virginia.

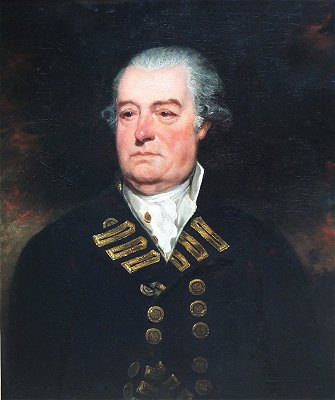
Admiral Marriot Arbuthnot

The departure of Destouches' fleet from Newport had prompted General Clinton to send Arnold reinforcements. In the wake of Arbuthnot's sailing he sent transports carrying about 2,000 men under the command of General William Phillips to the Chesapeake. These joined Arnold at Portsmouth on March 27. Phillips, as senior commander, took over the force and resumed raiding, targeting Petersburg and Richmond. By this time, Baron von Steuben and Peter Muhlenberg, the militia commanders in Virginia, felt they had to make a stand to maintain morale despite the inferior strength of their troops. They established a defensive line in Blandford, near Petersburg (Blandford is now a part of the city of Petersburg), and fought a disciplined but losing action on April 25. Von Steuben and Muhlenberg retreated before the advance of Phillips, who hoped to again raid Richmond. However, Lafayette made a series of forced marches, and reached Richmond on April 29, just hours before Phillips.

== Cornwallis and Lafayette ==
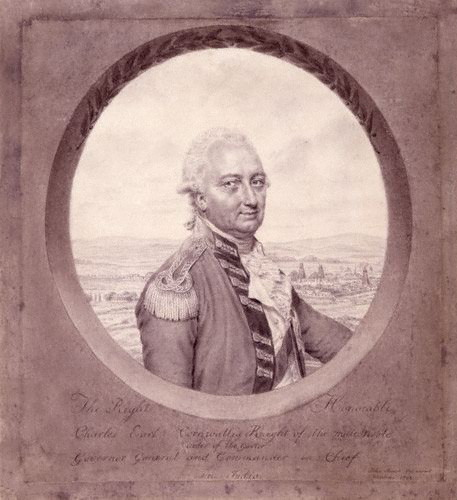
General Charles, Earl Cornwallis

To counter the British threat in the Carolinas, Washington had sent Major General Nathanael Greene, one of his best strategists, to rebuild the American army in North Carolina after the defeat at Camden. General Cornwallis, leading the British troops in the south, wanted to deal with him and gain control over the state. Greene divided his inferior force, sending part of his army under Daniel Morgan to threaten the British post at Ninety Six, South Carolina. Cornwallis sent Banastre Tarleton after Morgan, who almost wiped out Tarleton's command in the January Battle of Cowpens, and almost captured Tarleton in the process.

This action was followed by what has been called the "race to the Dan," in which Cornwallis gave chase to Morgan and Greene in an attempt to catch them before they reunited their forces. When Greene successfully crossed the Dan River and entered Virginia, Cornwallis, who had stripped his army of most of its baggage, gave up the pursuit. However, Greene received reinforcements and supplies, recrossed the Dan, and returned to Greensboro, North Carolina to do battle with Cornwallis. The earl won the battle, but Greene was able to withdraw with his army intact, and the British suffered enough casualties that Cornwallis was forced to retreat to Wilmington for reinforcement and resupply. Greene then went on to regain control over most of South Carolina and Georgia. Cornwallis, in violation of orders but also in the absence of significant strategic direction by General Clinton, decided to take his army, now numbering just 1,400 men, into Virginia on April 25; it was the same day that Phillips and von Steuben fought at Blandford.

Phillips, after Lafayette beat him to Richmond, turned back east, continuing to destroy military and economic targets in the area. On May 7, Phillips received a dispatch from Cornwallis, ordering him to Petersburg to effect a junction of their forces; three days later, Phillips arrived in Petersburg. Lafayette briefly cannonaded the British position there, but did not feel strong enough to actually make an attack. On May 13, Phillips died of a fever, and Arnold retook control of the force. This caused some grumbling amongst the men, since Arnold was not particularly well respected.While waiting for Cornwallis, the forces of Arnold and Lafayette watched each other. Arnold attempted to open communications with the marquis (who had orders from Washington to summarily hang Arnold), but the marquis returned his letters unopened. Cornwallis arrived in Petersburg on May 19, prompting Lafayette, who commanded under 1,000 Continentals and about 2,000 militia, to retreat to Richmond. Further British reinforcements led by the Ansbacher Colonel von Voigt arrived from New York shortly after, raising the size of Cornwallis's army to more than 7,000.

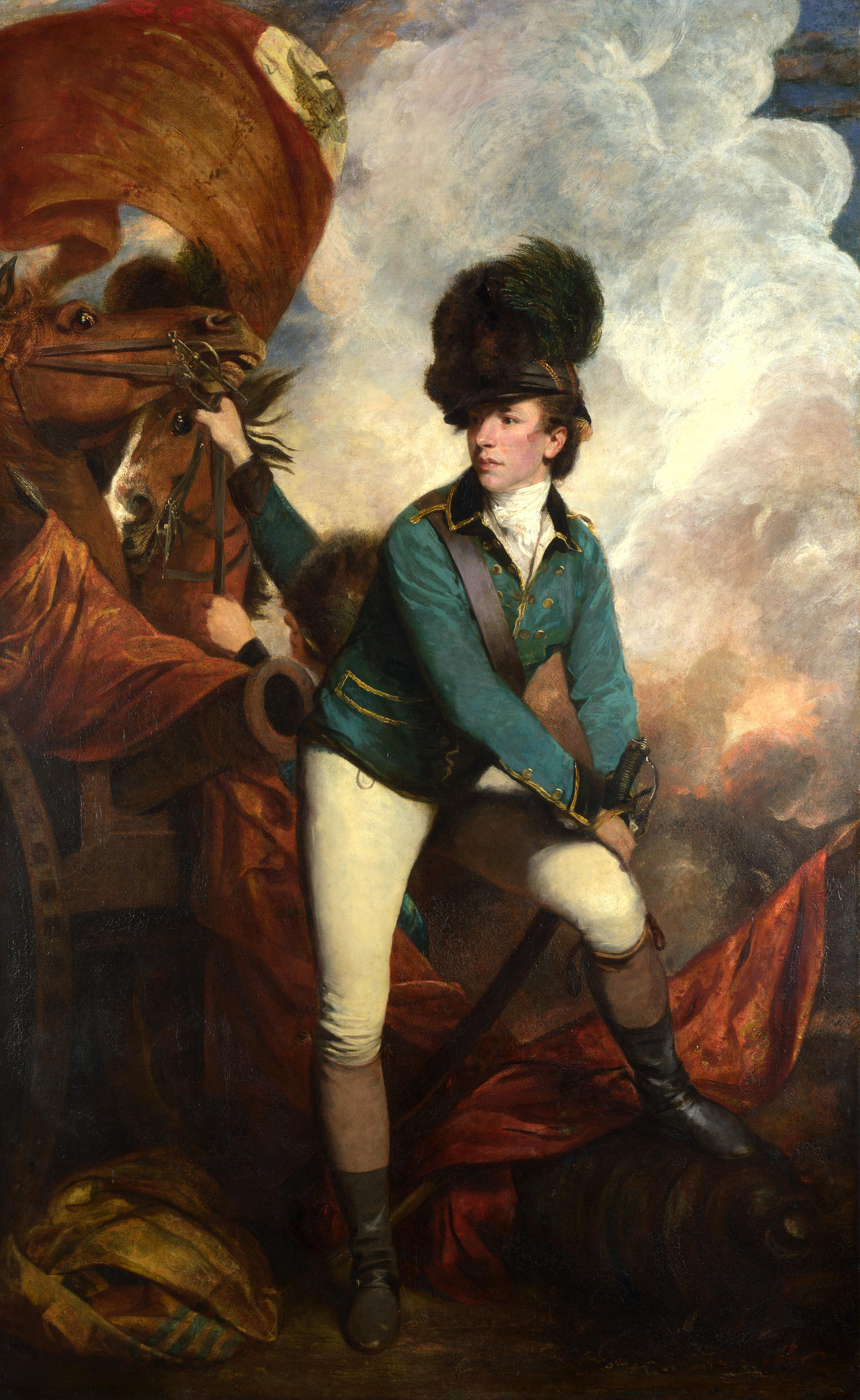
Portrait of Banastre Tarleton by Joshua Reynolds, 1782

Cornwallis, after dispatching General Arnold back to New York, set out to follow General Clinton's most recent orders to Phillips. These instructions were to establish a fortified base and raid rebel military and economic targets in Virginia. Cornwallis decided that he had to first deal with the threat posed by Lafayette, so he set out in pursuit of the marquis. Lafayette, clearly outnumbered, retreated rapidly toward Fredericksburg to protect an important supply depot there, while von Steuben retreated to Point of Fork (present-day Columbia, Virginia), where militia and Continental Army trainees had gathered with supplies pulled back before the raiding British. Cornwallis reached the Hanover County courthouse on June 1, and, rather than send his whole army after Lafayette, detached Banastre Tarleton and John Graves Simcoe on separate raiding expeditions.

Tarleton, his British Legion reduced by the debacle at Cowpens, rode rapidly with a small force to Charlottesville, where he captured several members of the Virginia legislature. He almost captured Governor Jefferson as well, but he was warned, with Jefferson and all but seven of the legislators escaping over the mountains. Tarleton had to content himself with several bottles of wine from Jefferson's estate at Monticello. Simcoe went to Point of Fork to deal with von Steuben and the supply depot. In a brief skirmish on June 5, von Steuben's forces, numbering about 1,000, suffered 30 casualties, but they had withdrawn most of the supplies across the river. Simcoe, who only had about 300 men, then exaggerated the size of his force by lighting a large number of campfires; this prompted von Steuben to withdraw from Point of Fork, leaving the supplies to be destroyed by Simcoe the next day.

Lafayette, in the meantime, was expecting the imminent arrival of long-delayed reinforcements. Several battalions of Pennsylvania Continentals under Brigadier General Anthony Wayne had also been authorised by Congress for service in Virginia in February. However, Wayne had to deal with the aftereffects of a mutiny in January that nearly wiped out the Pennsylvania Line as a fighting force, and it was May before he had rebuilt the line and begun the march to Virginia. Even then, there was a great deal of mistrust between Wayne and his men; Wayne had to keep his ammunition and bayonets under lock and key except when they were needed. Although Wayne was ready to march on May 19, the force's departure was delayed by a day because of a renewed threat of mutiny after the units were paid with devalued Continental dollars. Lafayette and Wayne's 800 men joined forces at Raccoon Ford on the Rappahannock River on June 10. A few days later, Lafayette was further reinforced by 1,000 militia under the command of William Campbell.

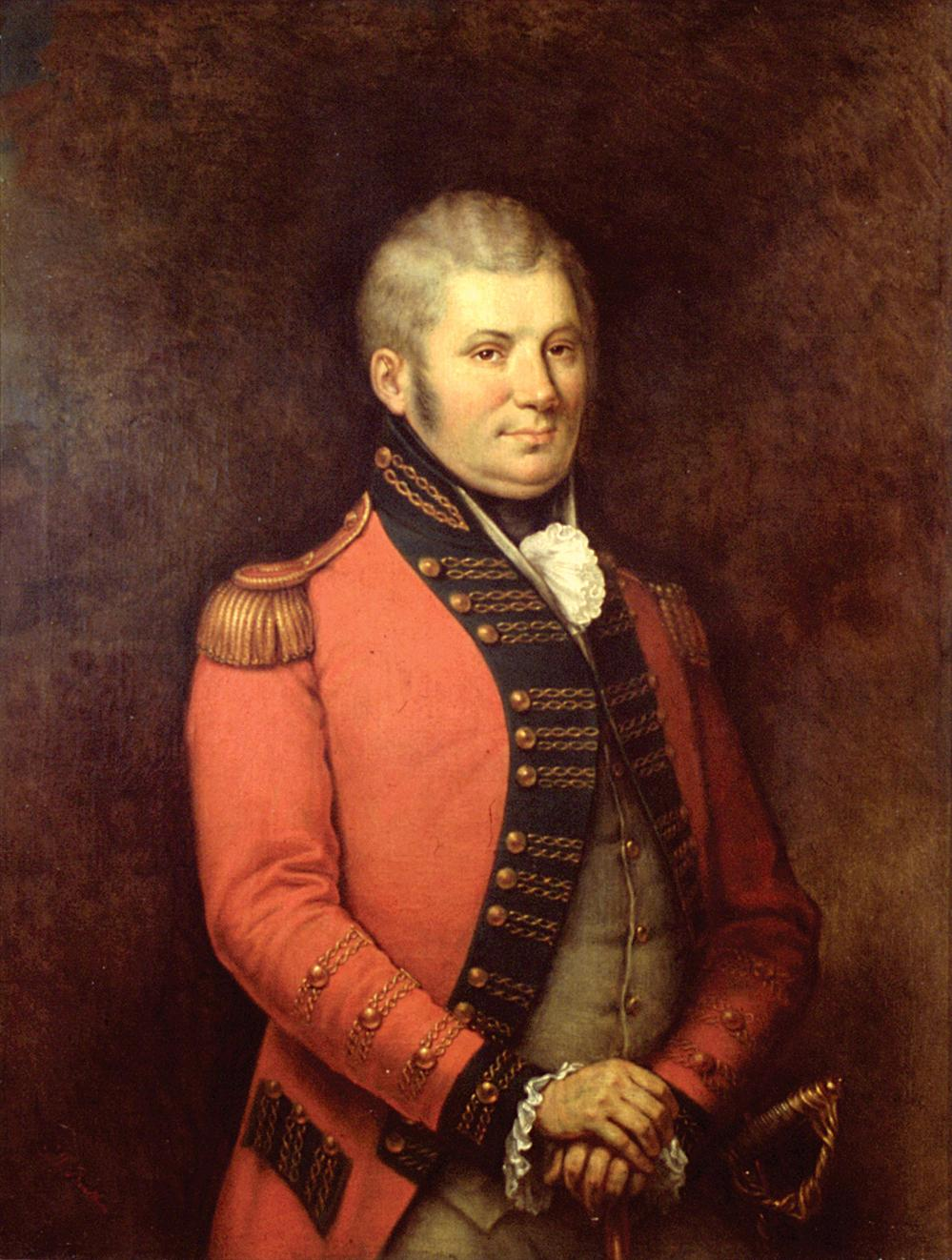
Lieutenant Colonel John Graves Simcoe

After the successful raids of Simcoe and Tarleton, Cornwallis began to make his way east toward Richmond and Williamsburg, almost contemptuously ignoring Lafayette in his movements. Lafayette, his force grown to about 4,500, was buoyed in confidence, and began to edge closer to the earl's army. By the time Cornwallis reached Williamsburg on June 25, Lafayette was 10 miles (16 km) away, at Bird's Tavern. That day, Lafayette learned that Simcoe's Queen's Rangers were at some remove from the main British force, so Lafayette sent some cavalry and light infantry to intercept them. This precipitated a skirmish at Spencer's Ordinary where each side believed the other to be within range of its main army.

== Allied decisions ==
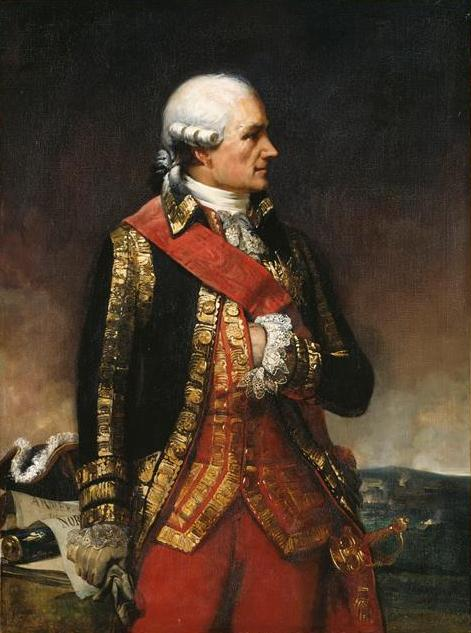
The Comte de Rochambeau

While Lafayette, Arnold, and Phillips manoeuvred in Virginia, the allied leaders, Washington and Rochambeau, considered their options. On May 6 the Concorde arrived in Boston, and two days later Washington and Rochambeau were informed of the arrival of de Barras as well as the vital dispatches and funding. On May 23 and 24, Washington and Rochambeau held a conference at Wethersfield, Connecticut where they discussed what steps to take next. They agreed that, pursuant to his orders, Rochambeau would move his army from Newport to the Continental Army camp at White Plains, New York. They also decided to send dispatches to de Grasse outlining two possible courses of action. Washington favored the idea of attacking New York, while Rochambeau favored action in Virginia, where the British were less well established. Washington's letter to de Grasse outlined these two options; Rochambeau, in a private note, informed de Grasse of his preference. Lastly, Rochambeau convinced de Barras to hold his fleet in readiness to assist in either operation, rather than taking it out on expeditions to the north as he had been ordered. The Concorde sailed from Newport on June 20, carrying dispatches from Washington, Rochambeau, and de Barras, as well as the pilots de Grasse had requested. The French army left Newport in June, and joined Washington's army at Dobb's Ferry, New York on July 7. From there, Washington and Rochambeau embarked on an inspection tour of the British defenses around New York while they awaited word from de Grasse.

De Grasse had a somewhat successful campaign in the West Indies. His forces successfully captured Tobago in June after a minor engagement with the British fleet. Beyond that, he and British Admiral George Brydges Rodney avoided significant engagement. De Grasse arrived at Cap-Français on July 16, where the Concorde awaited him. He immediately engaged in negotiations with the Spanish. He informed them of his intent to sail north, but promised to return by November to assist in Spanish operations in exchange for critical Spanish cover while he sailed north. From them he secured the promise to protect French commerce and territories so that he could bring north his entire fleet, 28 ships of the line. In addition to his fleet, he took on 3,500 troops under the command of the Marquis de St. Simon, and appealed to the Spanish in Havana for funds needed to pay Rochambeau's troops. On July 28, he sent the Concorde back to Newport, informing Washington, Rochambeau, and de Barras that he expected to arrive in the Chesapeake at the end of August, and would need to leave by mid-October. He sailed from Cap-Français on August 5, beginning a deliberately slow route north through a little-used channel in the Bahamas.

== British decisions ==
The movement of the French army to the New York area caused General Clinton a great deal of concern; letters written by Washington that Clinton had intercepted suggested that the allies were planning an attack on New York. Beginning in June he wrote a series of letters to Cornwallis containing a confusing and controversial set of ruminations, suggestions, and recommendations, that only sometimes contained concrete and direct orders.Some of these letters were significantly delayed in reaching Cornwallis, complicating the exchange between the two. On June 11 and 15, apparently in reaction to the threat to New York, Clinton requested Cornwallis to fortify either Yorktown or Williamsburg, and send any troops he could spare back to New York. Cornwallis received these letters at Williamsburg on June 26.He and an engineer inspected Yorktown, which he found to be defensively inadequate. He wrote a letter to Clinton indicating that he would move to Portsmouth in order to send troops north with transports available there.

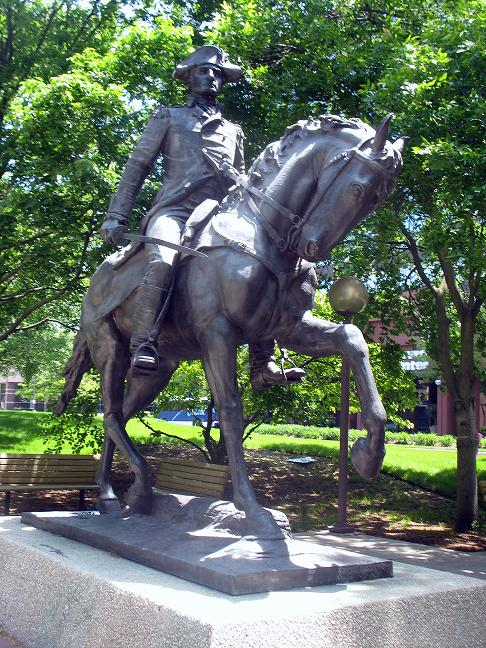
Brigadier General Anthony Wayne

On July 4 Cornwallis began moving his army toward the Jamestown ferry, to cross the broad James River and march to Portsmouth. Lafayette's scouts observed the motion, and he realised the British force would be vulnerable during the crossing. He advanced his army to the Green Spring Plantation, and, based on intelligence that only the British rear guard was left at the crossing, sent General Wayne forward to attack them on July 6. In reality, the earl had laid a clever trap. Crossing only his baggage and some troops to guard them, he sent "deserters" to falsely inform Lafayette of the situation. In the Battle of Green Spring, General Wayne managed to escape the trap, but with significant casualties and the loss of two field pieces. Cornwallis then crossed the river, and marched his army to Suffolk.

Cornwallis again detached Tarleton on a raid into central Virginia. Tarleton's raid was based on intelligence that supplies might be intercepted that were en route to General Greene. The raid, in which Tarleton's force rode 120 miles (190 km) in four days, was a failure, since supplies had already been moved. (During this raid, some of Tarleton's men were supposedly in a minor skirmish with Peter Francisco, one of the American heroes of Guilford Court House.) Cornwallis received another letter from General Clinton while at Suffolk, dated June 20, stating that the forces to be embarked were to be used for an attack against Philadelphia.

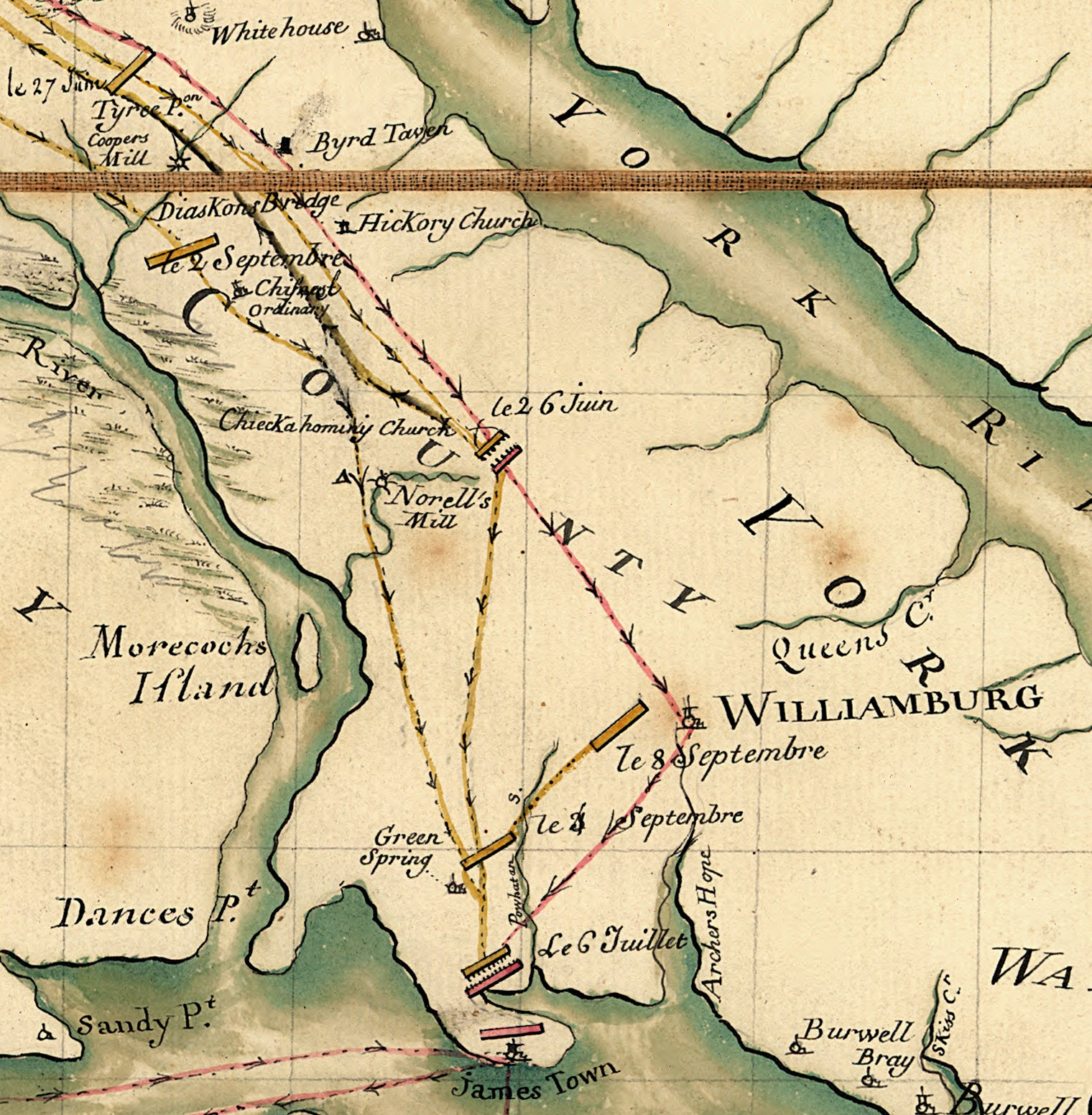
Detail from a 1781 French map prepared for Lafayette depicting the Williamsburg/Jamestown area and the movements of Lafayette and Cornwallis. The clash at Spencer's is marked by "le 26 Juin", and that at Green Spring is labelled "le 6 Juillet".

When Cornwallis reached Portsmouth, he began embarking troops pursuant to Clinton's orders. On July 20, with some transports almost ready to sail, new orders arrived that countermanded the previous ones. In the most direct terms, Clinton ordered him to establish a fortified deep-water port, using as much of his army as he thought necessary. Clinton took this decision because the navy had long been dissatisfied with New York as a naval base, firstly because sand bars obstructed the entrance to the Hudson River, damaging the hulls of the larger ships; and secondly because the river often froze in winter, imprisoning vessels inside the harbour. Arbuthnot had recently been replaced and to show his satisfaction at this development, Clinton now acceded to the Navy's request, despite Cornwallis's warning that the Chesapeake's open bays and navigable rivers meant that any base there "will always be exposed to sudden French attack." It was to prove a fatal error of judgement by Clinton, since the need to defend the new facility denied Cornwallis any freedom of movement. Nevertheless, having inspected Portsmouth and found it less favourable than Yorktown, Cornwallis wrote to Clinton informing him that he would fortify Yorktown.

Lafayette was alerted on July 26 that Cornwallis was embarking his troops, but lacked intelligence about their eventual destination, and began manoeuvring his troops to cover some possible landing points. On August 6 he learned that Cornwallis had landed at Yorktown and was fortifying it and Gloucester Point just across the York River.

== Convergence on Yorktown ==
Admiral Rodney had been warned that de Grasse was planning to take at least part of his fleet north. Although he had some clues that he might take his whole fleet (he was aware of the number of pilots de Grasse had requested, for example), he assumed that de Grasse would not leave the French convoy at Cap-Français, and that part of his fleet would escort it to France as Admiral Guichen had done the previous year. Rodney made his dispositions accordingly, balancing the likely requirements of the fleet in North America with the need to protect Britain's own trade convoys. Sixteen of his twenty-one battleships, therefore, were to sail with Hood in pursuit of de Grasse to the Chesapeake before proceeding to New York. Rodney, who was ill, meanwhile took three other battleships back to England, two as merchant escorts, leaving his remaining two in dock for repairs. Hood was well satisfied with these arrangements, telling a colleague that his fleet was "equal fully to defeat any designs of the enemy, let de Grasse bring or send what number of ships he might in aid of Barras." What neither Rodney or Hood knew was de Grasse's last minute decision to take his entire fleet to North America, thus ensuring a French superiority of three to two in battleship strength. Blissfully unaware of this development, Hood eventually sailed from Antigua on August 10, five days after de Grasse. He had at this point, however, only fourteen of his allotted sixteen battleships, the Torbay and Prince William having been diverted by Rodney to protect a Jamaica trade convoy. They only joined Hood five week after the battle off the Virginia Capes. During the voyage, one of his smaller ships carrying intelligence about the American pilots was captured by a privateer, thus further depriving the British in New York of valuable information. Hood himself, following the direct route, reached the Chesapeake on August 25, and found the entrance to the bay empty. He then sailed on to New York to meet with Admiral Sir Thomas Graves, in command of the New York station following Arbuthnot's departure.

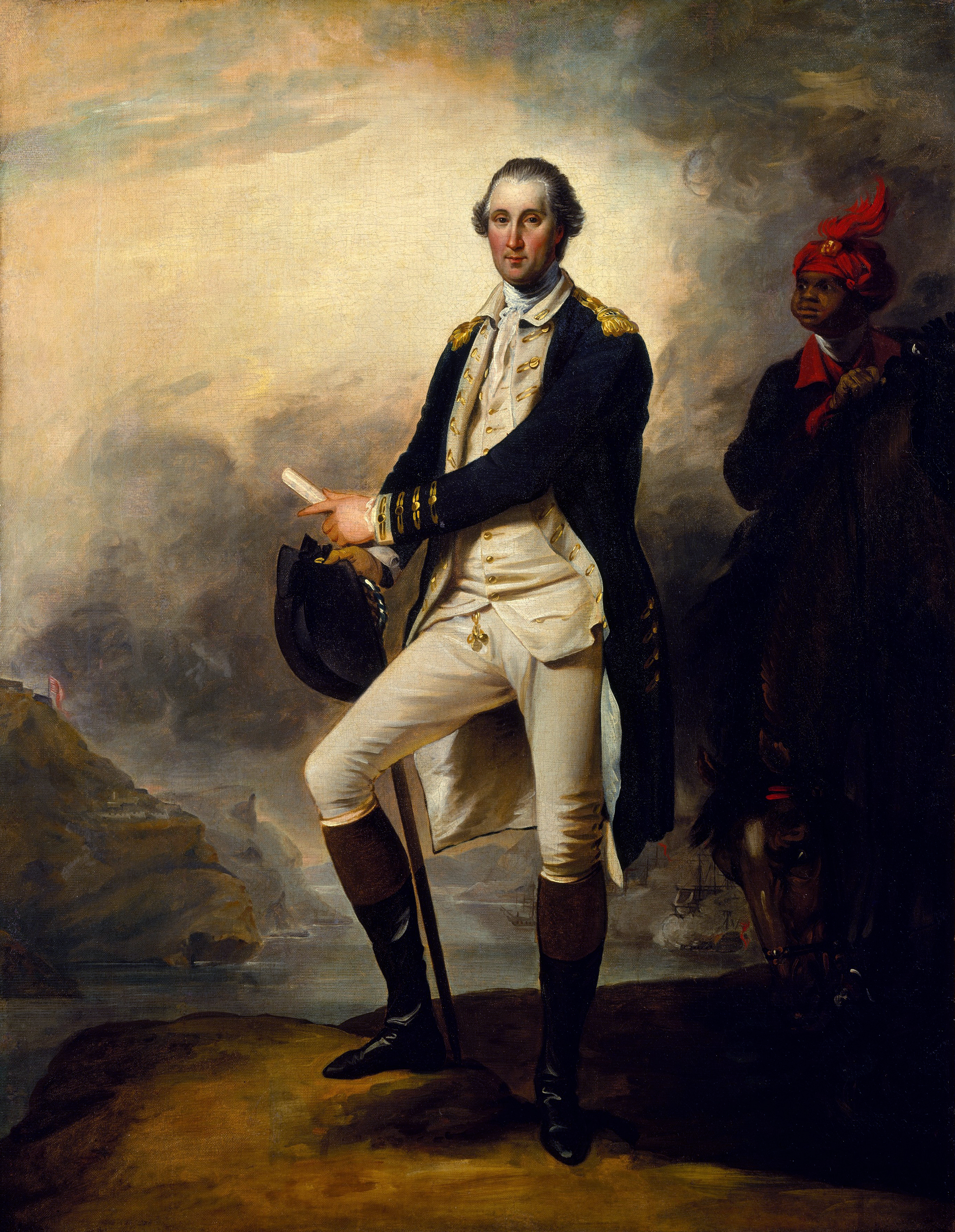
George Washington, by John Trumbull, 1780

On August 14 General Washington learned of de Grasse's decision to sail for the Chesapeake. The next day he reluctantly abandoned the idea of assaulting New York, writing that "[m]atters having now come to a crisis and a decisive plan to be determined on, I was obliged ... to give up all idea of attacking New York..." The combined Franco-American army began moving south on August 19, engaging in several tactics designed to fool Clinton about their intentions. Some forces were sent on a route along the New Jersey shore, and ordered to make camp preparations as if preparing for an attack on Staten Island. The army also carried landing craft to lend verisimilitude to the idea. Washington sent orders to Lafayette to prevent Cornwallis from returning to North Carolina; he did not learn that Cornwallis was entrenching at Yorktown until August 30. Two days later the army was passing through Philadelphia; another mutiny was averted there when funds were procured for troops that threatened to stay until they were paid.

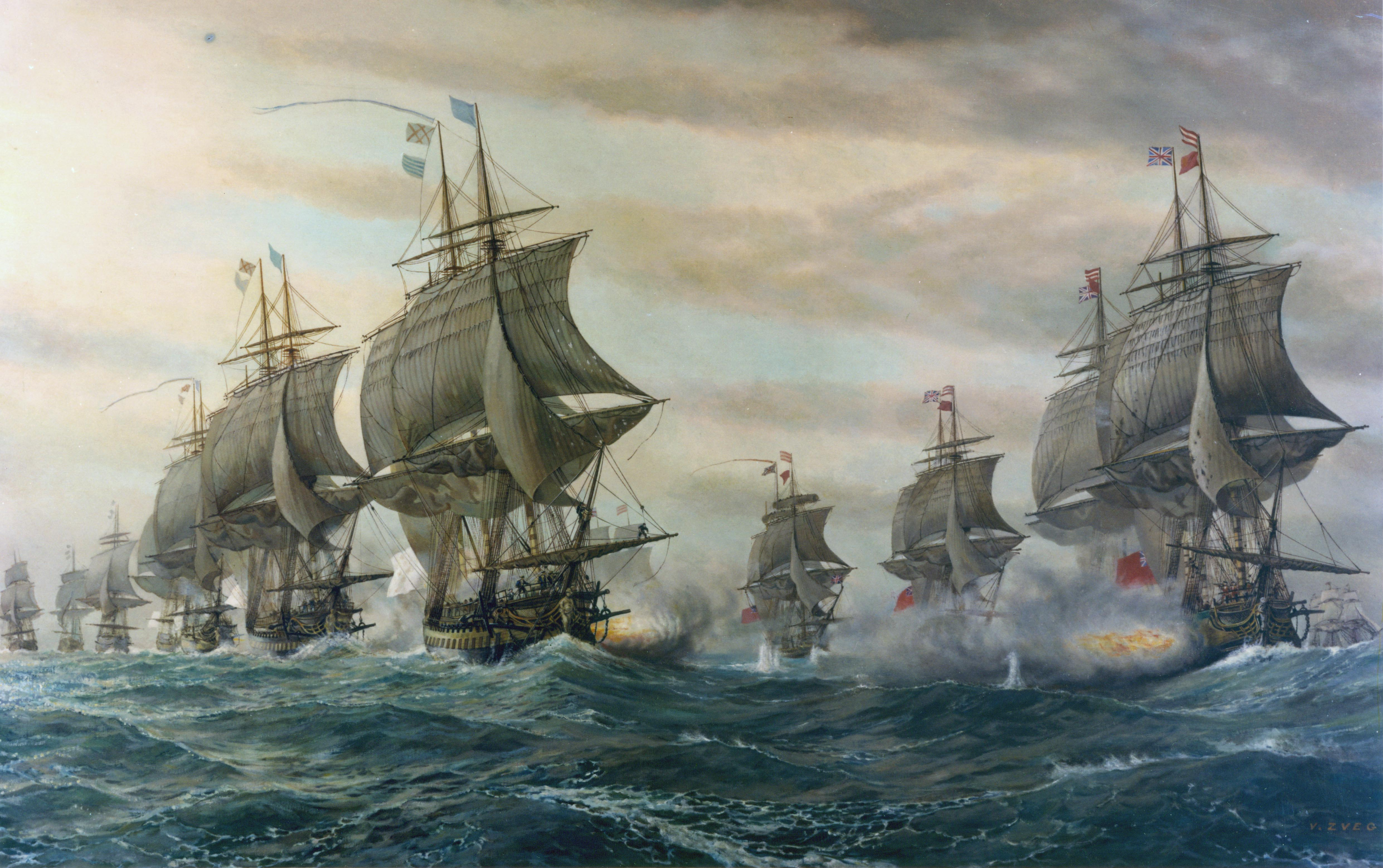
The Battle of the Chesapeake

Admiral de Barras sailed with his fleet from Newport, carrying the French siege equipment, on August 25. He sailed a route that deliberately took him away from the coast to avoid encounters with the British. De Grasse reached the Chesapeake on August 30, five days after Hood. He immediately debarked the troops from his fleet to assist Lafayette in blockading Cornwallis, and stationed some his ships to blockade the York and James Rivers.

News of de Barras' sailing reached New York on August 28, where Graves, Clinton, and Hood were meeting to discuss the possibility of making an attack on the French fleet in Newport, since the French army was no longer there to defend it.Clinton had still not realized that Washington was marching south, something he did not have confirmed until September 2. When they learned of de Barras' departure they immediately concluded that de Grasse must be headed for the Chesapeake (but still did not know of his strength). Graves sailed from New York on August 31 with 19 ships of the line; Clinton wrote Cornwallis to warn him that Washington was coming, and that he would send 4,000 reinforcements.

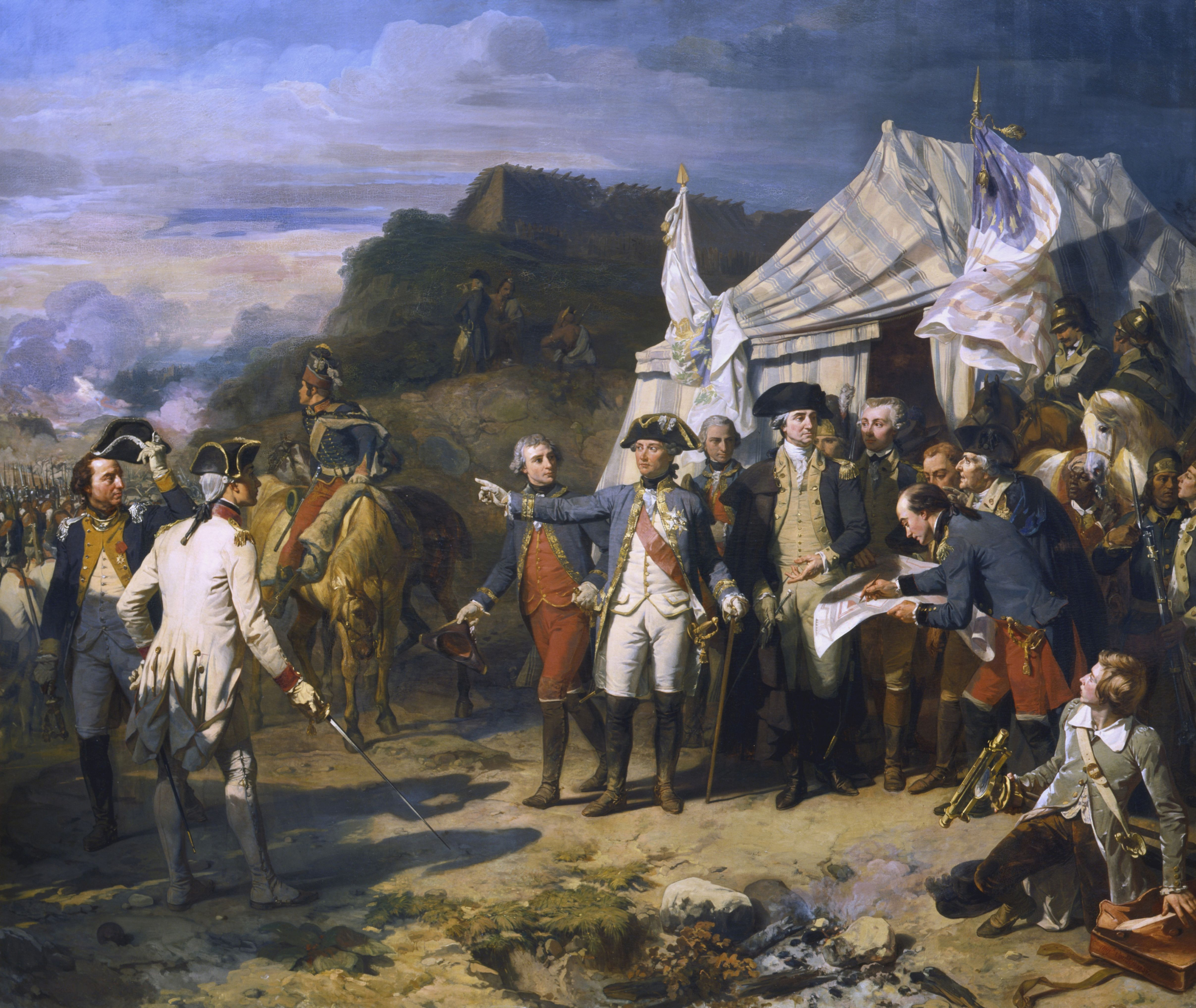
Painting by Auguste Couder depicting Washington and Rochambeau giving instructions before the siege of Yorktown

On September 5, the British fleet arrived at the mouth of the Chesapeake to see the French fleet anchored there. De Grasse, who had men ashore, was forced to cut his cables and scramble to get his fleet out to meet the British. In the Battle of the Chesapeake, de Grasse won a narrow tactical victory. After the battle, the two fleets drifted to the southeast for several days, with the British avoiding battle and both fleets making repairs. This was apparently in part a ploy by de Grasse to ensure the British would not interfere with de Barras' arrival. A fleet was spotted off in the distance on September 9 making for the bay; de Grasse followed the next day. Graves, forced to scuttle one of his ships, returned to New York for repairs. Smaller ships from the French fleet then assisted in transporting the Franco-American army down the Chesapeake to Yorktown, completing the encirclement of Cornwallis.

== Yorktown ==
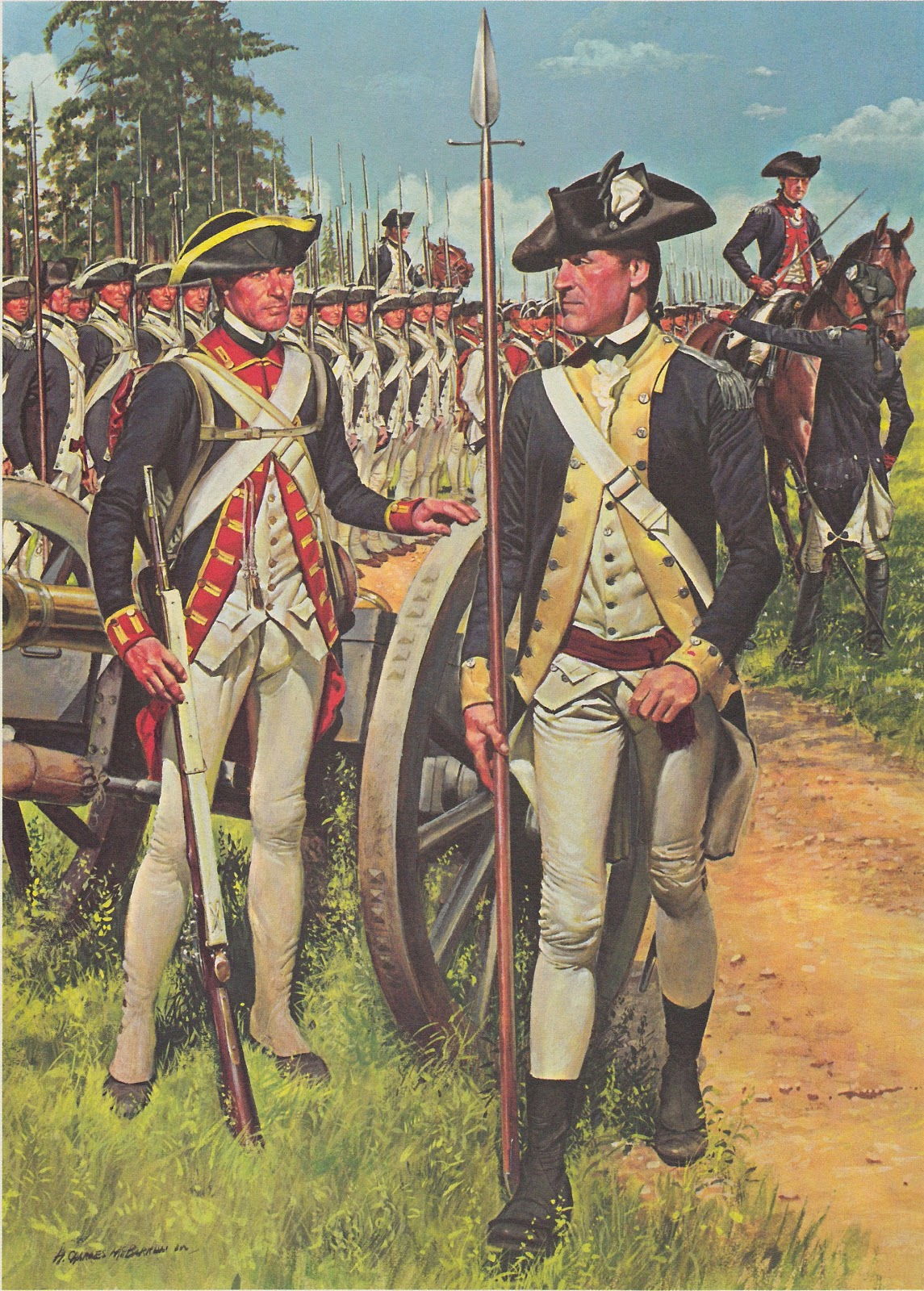
The Continental Army at the time of the Yorktown campaign

On September 6, General Clinton wrote a letter to Cornwallis, telling him to expect reinforcements. Received by Cornwallis on September 14, this letter may have been instrumental in the decision by Cornwallis to remain at Yorktown and not try to fight his way out, despite the urging of Banastre Tarleton to break out against the comparatively weak Lafayette. General Washington, after spending a few days at Mount Vernon for the first time in years, arrived in the camps outside Yorktown on September 17. That same day, the British military leadership in New York held a council, in which they agreed that Cornwallis could not be reinforced until they had regained control of the Chesapeake. Historian Richard Ketchum describes the decision of the council as leaving Cornwallis "dangling in the wind." One day earlier, Cornwallis wrote a desperate plea for help: "I am of the opinion that you can do me no effectual service but by coming directly to this place." Before dispatching the letter on the 17th, Cornwallis added, "If you cannot relieve me very soon, you must prepare to hear the worst."

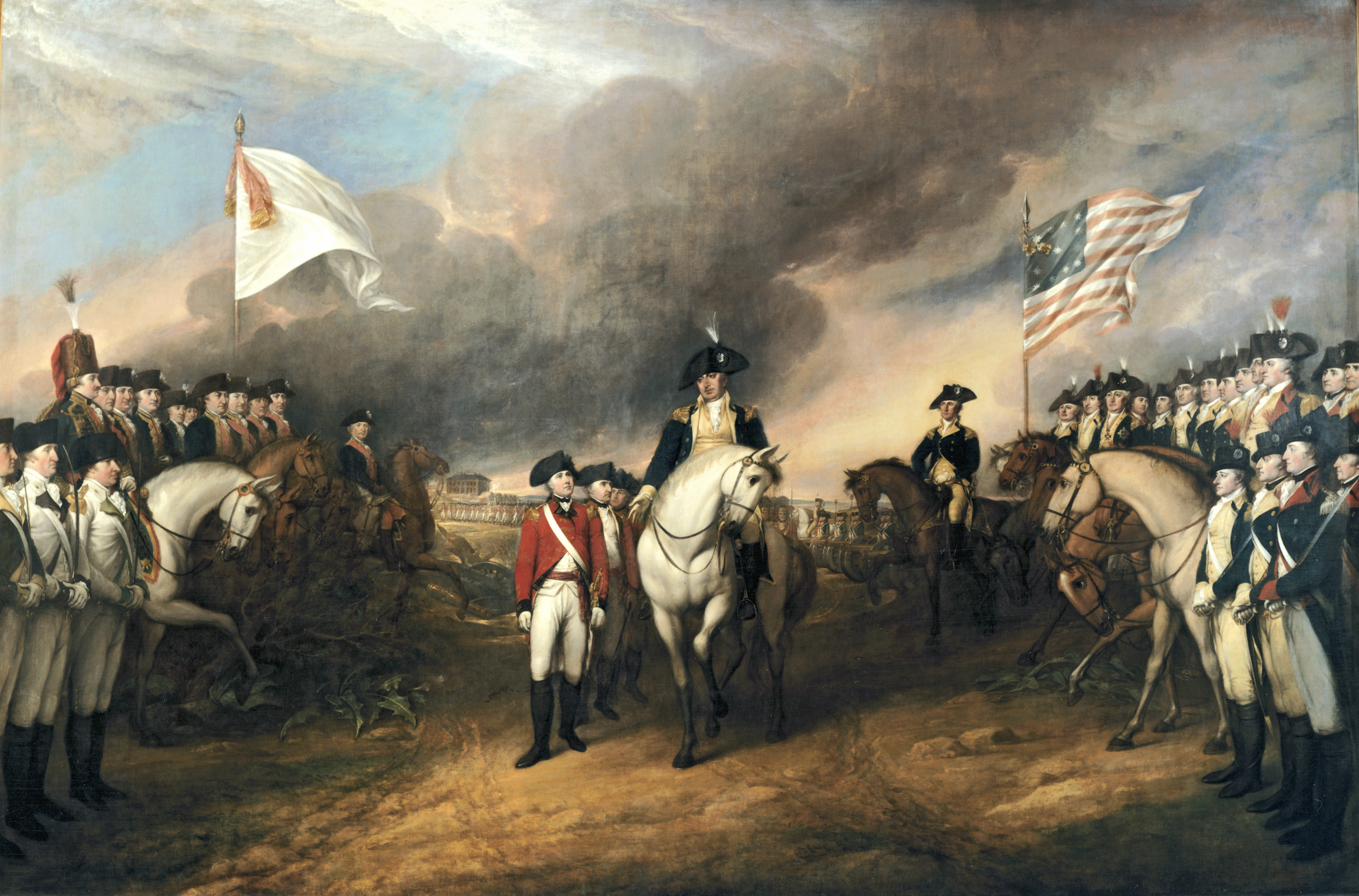
Surrender of Lord Cornwallis by John Trumbull, depicts the British surrendering to Benjamin Lincoln, flanked by French (left) and American troops. Oil on canvas, 1820.

Washington, Rochambeau, and de Grasse then held council aboard de Grasse's flagship Ville de Paris to finalize preparations for the siege; de Grasse agreed to provide about 2,000 marines and some cannons to the effort. During the meeting, de Grasse was convinced to delay his departure (originally planned for mid-October) until the end of October. Upon the return of the generals to Williamsburg, they heard rumors that British naval reinforcements had arrived at New York, and the French fleet might again be threatened. De Grasse wanted to pull his fleet out of the bay as a precaution, and it took the pleas of Washington and Rochambeau, delivered to de Grasse by Lafayette, to convince him to remain.

The siege formally got underway on September 28. Despite a late attempt by Cornwallis to escape via Gloucester Point, the siege lines closed in on his positions and the allied cannons wrought havoc in the British camps, and on October 17 he opened negotiations to surrender. On that very day, the British fleet again sailed from New York, carrying 6,000 troops. Still outnumbered by the combined French fleets, they eventually turned back. A French naval officer, noting the British fleet's departure on October 29, wrote, "They were too late. The fowl had been eaten."

== Aftermath ==
"Sir,—I have the mortification to inform your excellency that I have been forced to give up the posts of York and Gloucester, and to surrender the troops under my command, by capitulation on the 19th instant, as prisoners of war to the combined forces of America and France."

— Cornwallis to Clinton, October 20, 1781

=== Disposition of the British army ===
The negotiations for surrender were complicated by two issues. When American forces surrendered at Charleston in 1780, they were not granted customary terms of capitulation that included flying colors and the playing of an enemy tune. Washington insisted that these terms be applied to the surrender of the British army at Yorktown, his negotiators pointing out that the defenders had in both instances acted with valor. The second issue concerned the disposition of provincials in the British camp. This issue was finessed with the addition of a clause to the terms that allowed one British vessel, the sloop Bonetta, to be sent without any sort of inspection to carry dispatches from Cornwallis to New York; Americans, suspecting that either runaway slaves or provincials might be aboard, were prevented from searching the vessel.

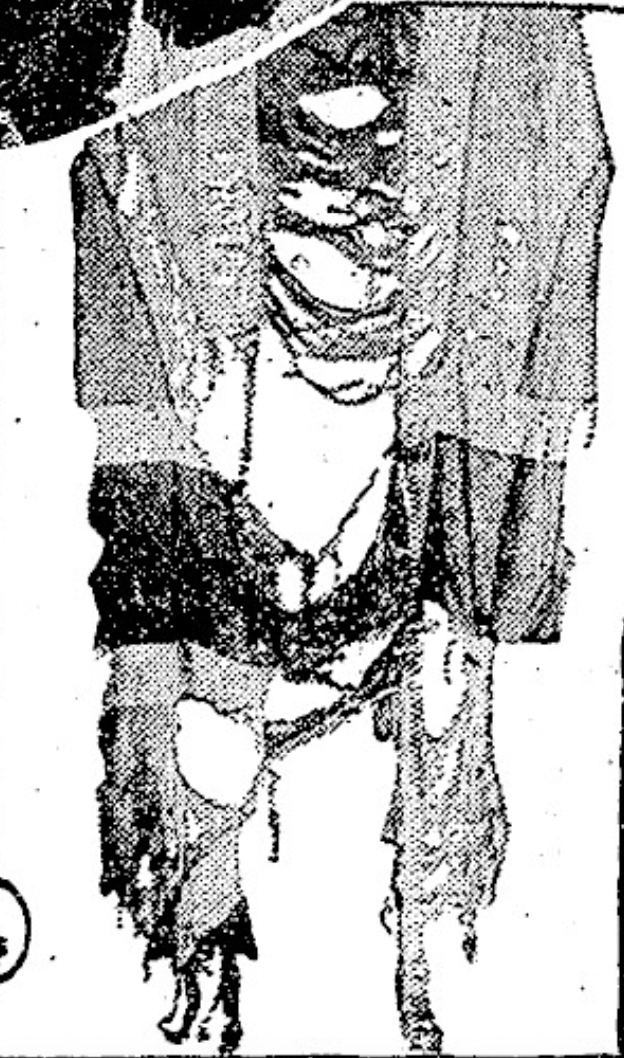
British flag captured after the battle

When the British garrison marched out of their positions on October 19 to surrender, it was with colors cased, possibly playing the British tune "The World Turned Upside Down". (Note: Definitive reference that this tune was played only first appeared in secondary accounts of the surrender in the 1820s.) Cornwallis, claiming illness, did not attend the ceremony, sending his deputy General O'Hara to deliver his sword. O'Hara at first sought to deliver it to a French officer, but he was finally directed to one of Washington's officers, Benjamin Lincoln, the defeated commander at Charleston. Lincoln briefly held the proffered sword and then returned it to O'Hara.

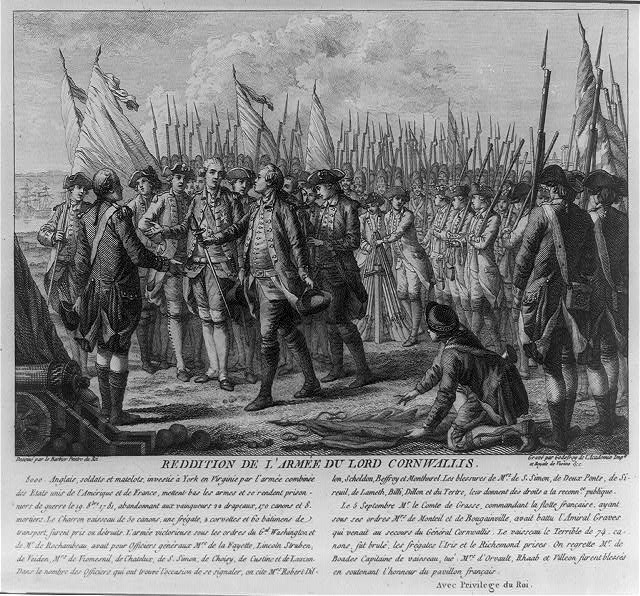
French engraving depicting the surrender

Over the following weeks, the army was marched under guard to camps in Virginia and Maryland. Cornwallis and other officers were returned to New York and allowed to return to England on parole. The ship on which Cornwallis sailed in December 1781 also carried Benedict Arnold and his family.

=== Disposition of the allies ===
The local militia that supported the siege were dismissed from service. Some of the American Continental forces were returned to the New York City region, where Washington continued to stand against the British presence until the end of the war; others were sent south to assist in General Greene's efforts in the Carolinas. Issues of pay and condition were an ongoing problem until the war ended, but Washington fought no more battles.

The French forces that came with de Grasse were reembarked, and he sailed for the West Indies, with the fleet of de Barras, in early November. After recapturing a number of British-held targets there, de Grasse was preparing to join with the Spanish for an assault on Jamaica when Admiral Rodney defeated him in the April 1782 Battle of the Saintes, capturing him and his flagship. The forces of General Rochambeau wintered in Virginia, and marched back to Rhode Island the next summer.

=== Disposition of the slaves ===
During the Yorktown campaign, numerous enslaved African-Americans had fled from their enslavers towards British lines in hope of freedom. On October 25, Washington issued an order which stipulated that all fugitive slaves who had joined the British were to be rounded up by the Continental Army and placed under the supervision of armed guards in fortified positions on both sides of the York River. There, they were to remain until "arrangements could be made to return them to their enslavers." The American historian Gregory J. W. Urwin describes Washington's action as "[converting] his faithful Continentals—the men credited with winning American independence—into an army of slave catchers."

=== Reactions ===
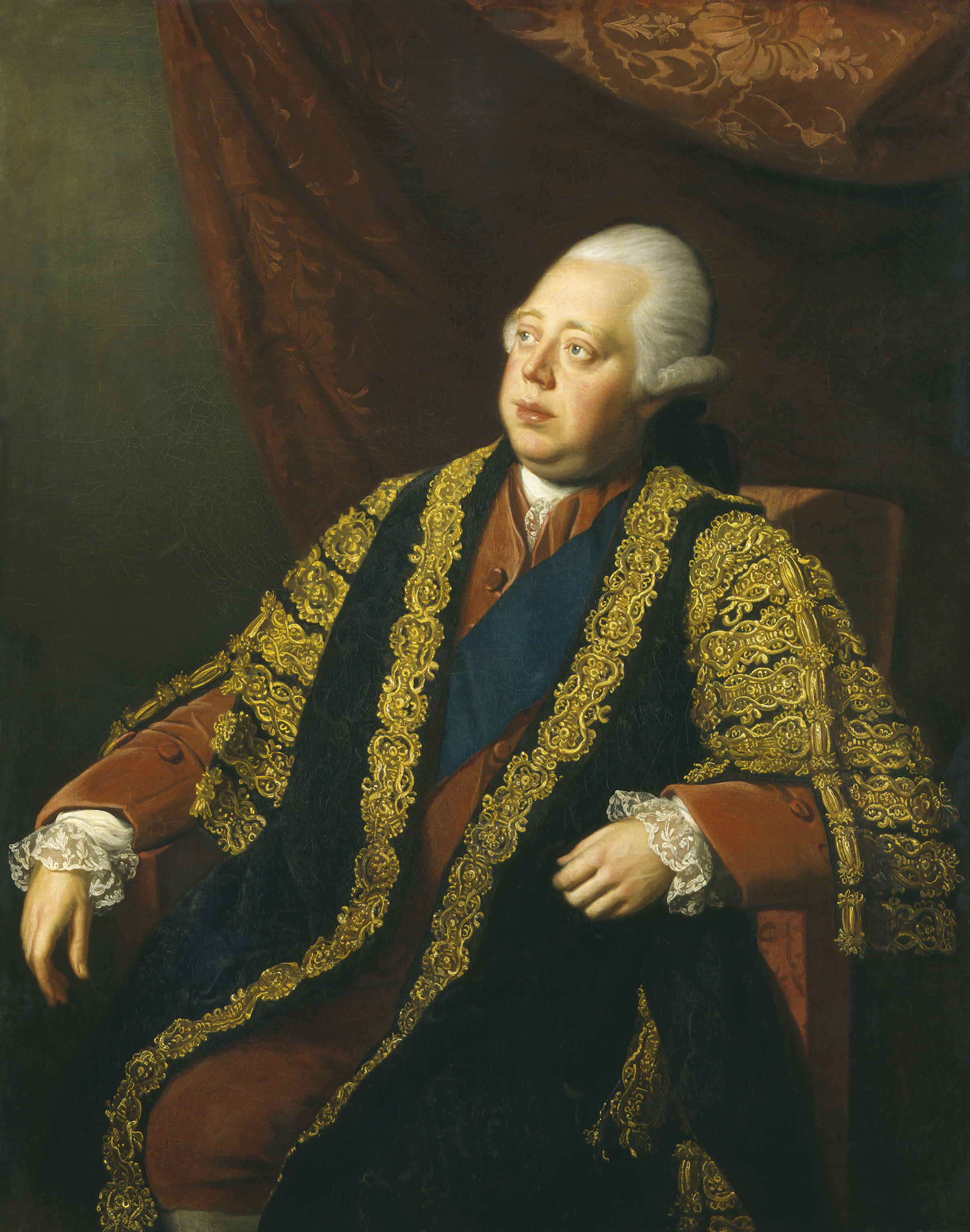
British Prime Minister Lord North

General Washington's aide, Lieutenant Tench Tilghman, was dispatched to deliver the news to Congress. Arriving in Philadelphia on October 22, he was two days behind the first notice of the surrender, which had been expressed from Baltimore ahead of him. The news electrified Congress and the populace. Church bells pealed, and the Liberty Bell was reportedly rung, actions that were repeated as the news traveled through the colonies. Some Congressmen introduced a resolution calling on General Washington to arrest and hang General Cornwallis; after "[t]he debate continue'd several Day's", the resolution was voted down. The news put British-occupied New York City into mourning. At first met with some skepticism, the news was finally confirmed on October 27, although the city still awaited news of Clinton's abortive relief effort. Clinton was recalled to London, and left the city in March 1782. He was replaced by General Guy Carleton, who was under orders to suspend offensive operations.

When the news reached London on November 25, Lord Germain described the reaction of Lord North to the news: "he would have taken a ball on his breast. For he opened his arms exclaiming wildly as he paced up and down the apartment, during the few minutes, 'Oh God! It is all over!'" King George was reported to receive the news with calmness and dignity, although he later became depressed as the news sank in, and even considered abdication. The king's supporters in Parliament were depressed, and the opposition elated. A resolution calling for an end to the war was introduced on December 12, and failed to pass by a single vote. Lord Germain was dismissed in early 1782, and the North administration fell shortly afterward.Peace negotiations followed, and the war was formally ended with the signing of the Treaty of Paris on September 3, 1783.

General Cornwallis, despite being the commander who surrendered, was not blamed for the defeat. He was well-received on his return to London, and one writer echoed a common sentiment that "Lord Cornwallis's army was sold."General Clinton spent the rest of his life defending his own reputation; he was "laughed at by the rebels, despised by the British, and cursed by the loyalists." In 1783, he published a Narrative of the Campaign of 1781 in North America in which he attempted to lay the blame for the 1781 campaign failures on General Cornwallis. This was met with a public response by Cornwallis, who leveled his own criticisms at Clinton. The highly public debate included the publication of much of their correspondence.

Admiral Graves also did not suffer due to his defeat by de Grasse; he was eventually promoted to full admiral and given a peerage. However, many aspects of the Battle of the Chesapeake have been the subject of both contemporary and historical debate, beginning right after the battle. On 6 September, Admiral Graves issued a memorandum justifying a confusing use of signals, indicating that "[when] the signal for the line of battle ahead is out at the same time with the signal for battle, it is not to be understood that the latter signal shall be rendered ineffectual by a too strict adherence to the former." Hood, in commentary written on the reverse of his copy, observed that this eliminated any possibility of engaging an enemy who was disordered, since it would require the British line to also be disordered. Instead, he maintained, "the British fleet should be as compact as possible, in order to take the critical moment of an advantage opening ..." Others criticise Hood because he "did not wholeheartedly aid his chief", and that a lesser officer "would have been court-martialled for not doing his utmost to engage the enemy.

The Comte de Rochambeau dispatched two messengers to deliver the news to Paris in a move that had unusual consequences in French military politics. The Duc de Lauzun and the Comte de Deux-Ponts, both of whom had distinguished themselves in the siege, were sent on separate ships to bring the news. Deux-Ponts was accompanied by a favorite of the French naval minister the Marquis de Castries, the Comte de Charlus, who Lauzun had urged Rochambeau to send in his stead for political reasons. King Louis XVI and his ministers received the news warmly, but Castries and the snubbed Charlus ensured that Lauzun and Rochambeau were denied or delayed in the receipt of rewards for the success. Deux-Ponts was rewarded with the Order of Saint Louis and command of a regiment.

== Analysis ==
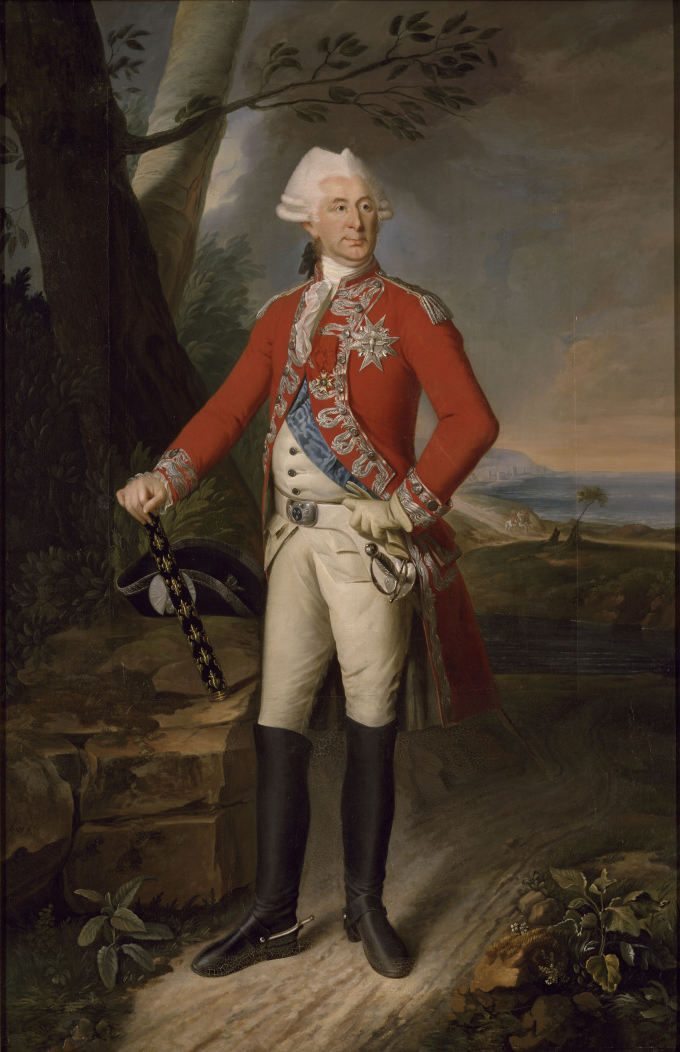
French Marine Minister the Marquis de Castries made important strategic decisions before the campaign began.

Historian John Pancake describes the later stages of the campaign as "British blundering" and that the "allied operations proceeded with clockwork precision."Naval historian Jonathan Dull has described de Grasse's 1781 naval campaign, which encompassed, in addition to Yorktown, successful contributions to the French capture of Tobago and the Spanish siege of Pensacola, as the "most perfectly executed naval campaign of the age of sail", and compared the string of French successes favorably with the British Annus Mirabilis of 1759. He also observes that a significant number of individual decisions, at times against orders or previous agreements, contributed to the success of the campaign:

1. French ministers Montmorin and Vergennes convinced the French establishment that decisive action was needed in North America in order to end the war.
2. The French naval minister Castries wrote orders for de Grasse that gave the latter sufficient flexibility to assist in the campaign.
3. Spanish Louisiana Governor Bernardo de Gálvez released ships and troops to cover French territories while de Grasse sailed north with most of the French military establishment in the West Indies.
4. Spanish Cuban colonial official Francisco Saavedra cooperated in the decision-making that enabled de Grasse's northward expedition.
5. General Rochambeau and Chevalier Luzerne both urged de Grasse to decide on the Chesapeake.
6. Admiral de Barras violated his orders to operate off Newfoundland, making possible the timely delivery of the French siege train to Yorktown.
7. George Washington decided against an attack on New York and instead embarked on a risky march to Virginia.
8. Admiral De Grasse agreed to overstay his planned time in the Chesapeake, understanding the importance of the undertaking there.

Of de Grasse's negotiations with the Spanish that secured the use of his fleet and his order to the economic fleet to remain in the West Indies, Royal Navy Captain Thomas White, in his 1830 analysis of the 1781 campaign, wrote that "[i]f the British government had sanctioned, or a British admiral had adopted such a measure, [...] the one would have been turned out, and the other would have been hung: no wonder they succeeded and we failed.

== Legacy ==
The principal points of commemoration of the events of this campaign are managed by the National Park Service in the Colonial National Historical Park. In addition to the battlefield at Yorktown, the park includes the Cape Henry Memorial, where the French naval victory by de Grasse is remembered.

== See also ==
- List of American Revolutionary War battles
- Washington–Rochambeau Revolutionary Route
