= Fluvanna County militia =

The Fluvanna County militia was a component of the Virginia militia during the American Revolutionary War. It was based in Fluvanna County, Virginia for the majority of the war and only saw action near the end of the conflict, in 1781.

== Size ==
It is unknown how many people made up the Fluvanna militia at various points throughout the war. Six companies are listed as the station of Revolutionary War forces in local documents. As of January 13, 1781 Thomas Jefferson knew there to be 260 men enlisted in the militia. It is known that Thomas Jefferson asked for one quarter of the county's militia, 65 men, to fight at Green Spring, West Virginia in 1781, near the end of the war.

What is known is that Fluvanna was the site of Point of Fork Arsenal, a major center of arms manufacturing for the Virginia government during the Revolution.

== Origins ==
Like other county militias, the Fluvanna militia was formed as a local branch of the Virginia militia. It was led by Captain Richard Napier.

In order to join the militia, men were required to take a "Test Oath" renouncing King George III and pledging themselves to defend the Commonwealth.

== Known members ==
This is a list of known members of the militia and their rank, if appropriate.

KNOWN MEMBERS
LAST NAME	FIRST NAME	RANK	KNOWN SERVICE
Adams	James, Jr.	2d Lieutenant	Sep 4 1777
Anderson	Benjamin	1st Lieutenant	Sep 4 1777
Beckley	John	1st Lieutenant	Sep 4 1777
Bibee	William	Lieutenant	
Cole	James	Ensign	Mar 1778
Duncan	George	Captain	Sep 4 1777
East	James	Private	
Ford	John, Sr.	Private	
Grant	Robert	Private	
Moreland	Dudley	Private	
Haden	Anthony	Ensign	1779
Haden	Anthony	Captain	April 2, 1779
Haden	Joseph	Captain	Sep 4 1777
Haden	John Mozeley	1st Lieutenant	Sep 4 1777
Haden	John M.	Ensign	April 2, 1779
Haden	William	Ensign	April 2, 1779
Hall	Richard	1st Lieutenant	April 2, 1779
Hancock	Benj.	Ensign	April 2, 1779
Haslip	Henry	2d Lieutenant	Sep 4 1777
Henry	William	Lieutenant	Sep 4 1777
Johnson	William	Ensign	Sep 4 1777
Johnson	Walter	Ensign	
King	Sackville	2d Lieutenant	Feb 1 1781
Lee	Benjamin	Ensign	Sep 4 1777
Logan	Alexander	Private	
Martin	Benjamin	Ensign	Sep 4 1777
Martin	Henry	1st Lieutenant	Sep 4 1777
Martin	John	2d Lieutenant	Sep 4 1777
Martin	William	2d Lieutenant	Sep 4 1777
Mays (Mayo?)	Joseph	2d Lieutenant	May 6, 1779
Moore	Jesse	2d Lieutenant	Sep 4 1777
Moss	Alexander	1st Lieutenant	Sep 4 1777
Napier	John	Captain	Sep 4 1777 — April 4, 1779
Napier	Richard	Captain	Sep 4 1777
Napier	Thomas	Colonel	Sep 4 1777
Omohundro	Richard	Ensign	June 4, 1778
Quarles	Tunstall	Major	
Rice	Holman	Captain	
Rishardson	Samuel	Captain	
Thompson	George	Major	Sep 4 1777
Thompson	Leonard	Captain	Nov 6 1777
Thompson	Roger	Lieutenant Colonel	Nov 6 1777
Thurmond	Thomas	Captain	Sep 4 1777
Tilman	Daniel	1st Lieutenant	Sep 4 1777
Tilman	Daniel	Captain	Dec 3 1778
Tinsdale	Thomas	2d Lieutenant	Sep 4 1777
Williamson	John	2d Lieutenant	Sep 4 1777
Woody	William	2d Lieutenant	April 2, 1779
Wynne	Thomas	Ensign	Sep 4 1777

== Timeline of Events ==
1775	Capt. Thos. Holt was recruiting men in this County for several months.
1777	Capt. Joseph Hayden's Company was in service about three months.
17 —	Capt. Saml. Richardson's Company was in service at Hampton.
17 —	Capt. Samuel Richardson's Company was in service at Williamsburg.
1779	Capt. Samuel Richardson's Company was in service at Albemarle Barracks.
1779	Capt. Joseph Hayden's Company was in service about Williamsburg.
1780	Capt. Anthony Henderson's [Haden's] Company was in service at Albemarle Barracks.
1780	Capt. Levi [Leonard] Thompson's Company was in service at Cabin Point.
1781	Capt. Anthony Hayden's Company was in service at the time of Tarleton's Raid.
1781	At least one of the militiamen was engaged in making gun stocks for the army.
1781	Capt. Richard Napper's [Napier's] Company was at the Siege of York.
