= Point of Fork Arsenal =

Archaeological site in Virginia, United States

- U.S. National Register of Historic Places
- Virginia Landmarks Register
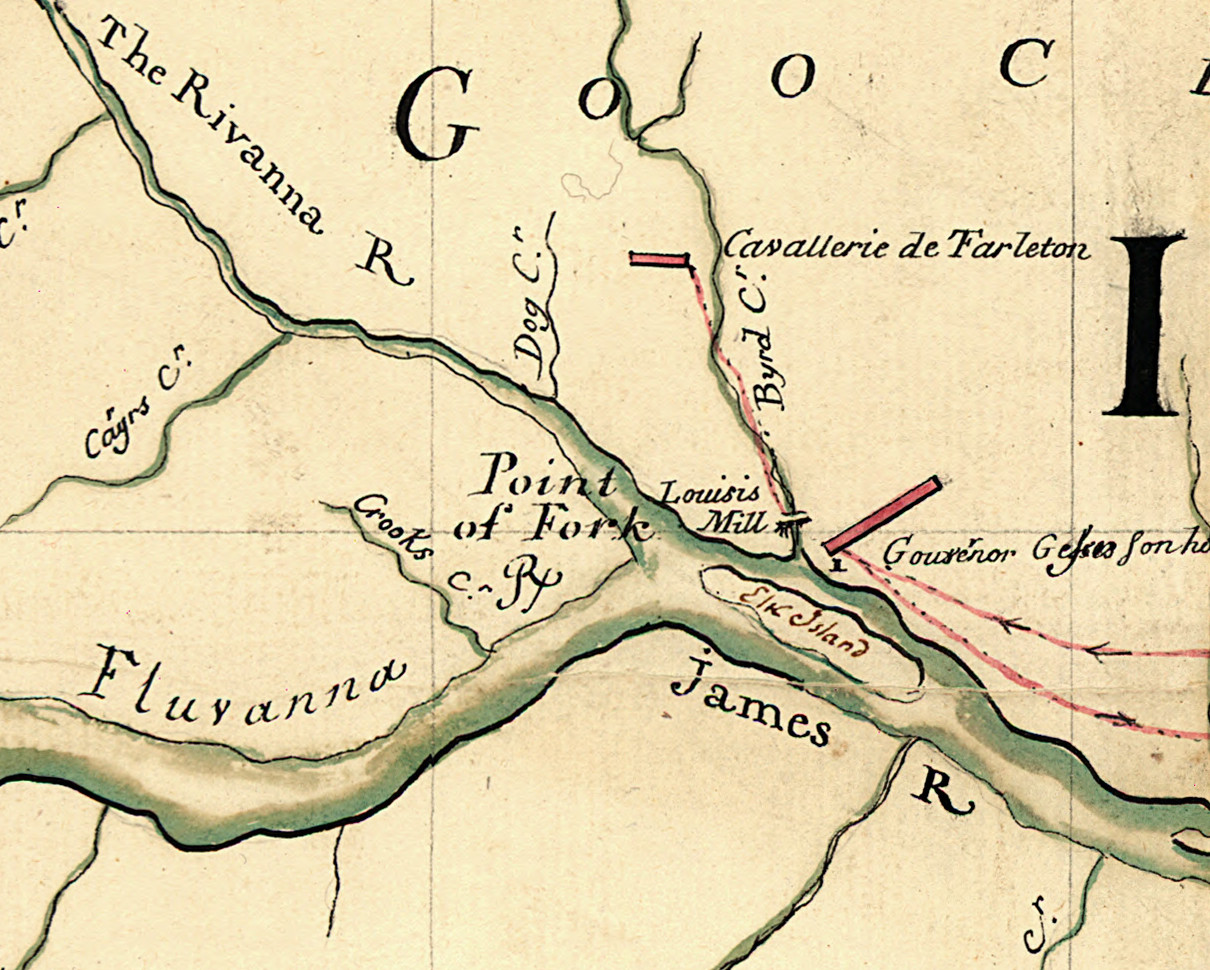
- Point of Fork on a French map of the 1781 campaigns

- Location within Virginia Location within the United States
- Location: Point of Fork
- Nearest city: Columbia, Virginia
- Coordinates: 37°45′3″N 78°10′3″W
- Area: 225 acres (91 ha)
- NRHP reference No.: 69000242
- VLR No.: 032-0026

Significant dates
- Added to NRHP: October 1, 1969
- Designated VLR: November 5, 1968

Point of Fork Arsenal was an arsenal established in the 18th century located near what is now Columbia, Virginia, United States. It was raided and destroyed on June 5, 1781, by Col. John Graves Simcoe of the Queen's Rangers. It was rebuilt and used for the manufacture and repair of arms and supplied material to combat the Whiskey Rebellion and to aid the Battle of Fallen Timbers. The arsenal remained in service until 1801, when it was abandoned in favor of a more centralized arsenal at Richmond, the Virginia Manufactory of Arms.

Today Point of Fork is a historic archaeological site. It was listed on the National Register of Historic Places in 1969.

== History ==
The arsenal was located at Point of Fork, a point where the Fluvanna River (the former name of the James River west of the Point of Fork) and Rivanna River meet. Stationed at Point of Fork were elements of the 5th Virginia (Gaskins' Battalion) as well as elements of the local Fluvanna County militia.

In May 1781, Baron von Steuben relocated to the arsenal. Von Steuben complained of the status of the militia found at Point of Fork, stating that there were few men and fewer provisions. Immediately, von Steuben set about refitting the 5th Virginia for deployment south with General Greene in South Carolina, this despite some controversy with the Virginia General Assembly after von Steuben's plan to reinforce the American armies in South Carolina was rejected for fear of leaving Virginia's rivers undefended.

=== Raid and destruction ===
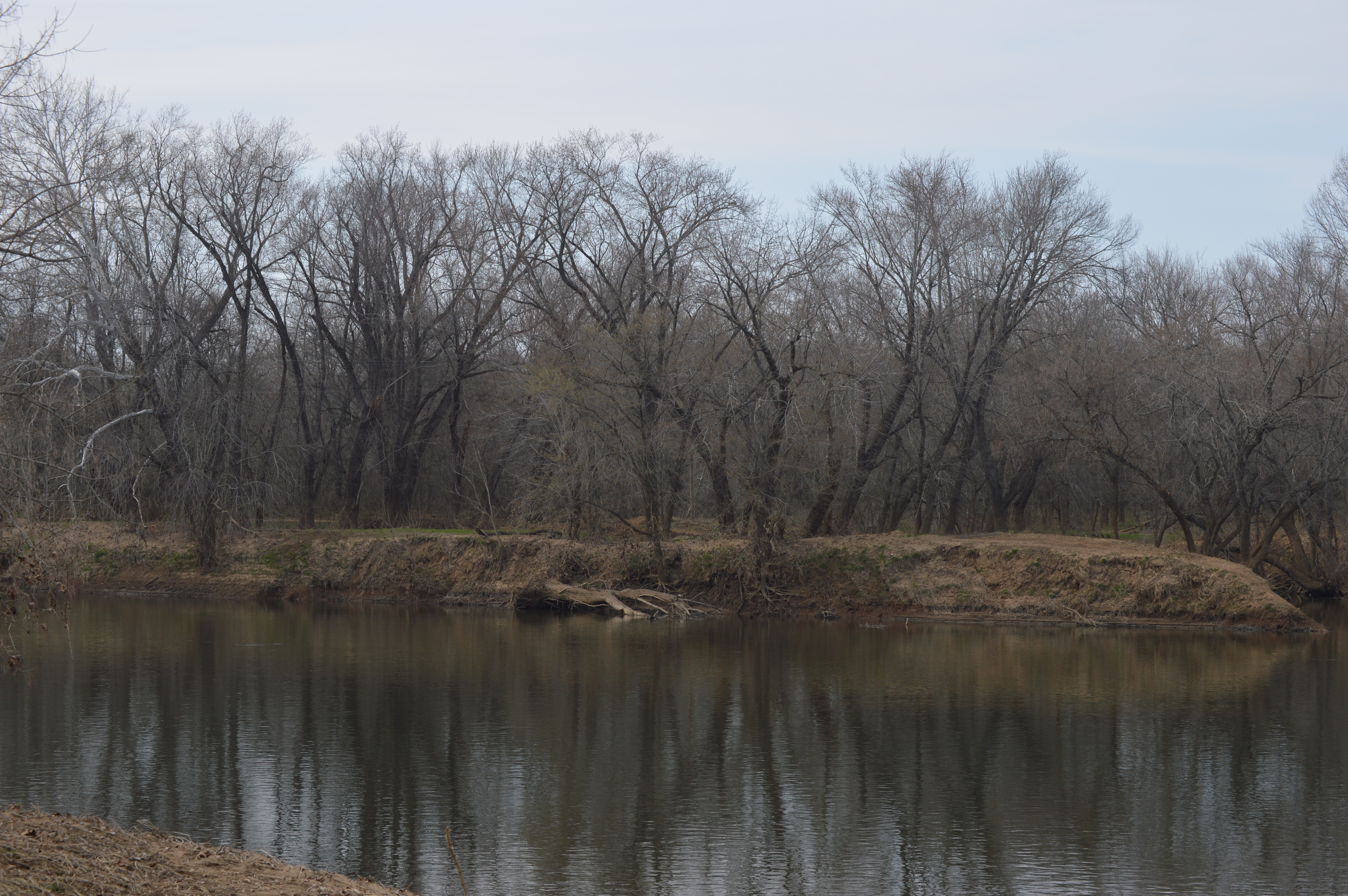
Arsenal site, seen from across the James River

By May 1781, General Cornwallis was determined to break the back of the Virginians and sent Lt. Col. Simcoe and a detachment of rangers to capture Point of Fork. Alongside this effort was a force under Col. Tarleton's cavalry, seeking to sack the Virginia General Assembly, capture Governor Thomas Jefferson, and burn out any warehouses or potential stores for the Marquis de Lafayette and his army to use in pursuit of Cornwallis.

When Simcoe reached the arsenal, he expected to surprise the American forces and seize the stores. Von Steuben, believing that Simcoe's detachment was a sign that the entire British army under Cornwallis was nearby, abandoned Point of Fork Arsenal, leaving it to the British detachment as they made their way towards Charlottesville and Governor Jefferson.

Tarleton, after failing in his mission of capturing Jefferson and the Virginia General Assembly, "destroying one thousand new muskets, four hundred barrels of powder, several hogsheads of tobacco, and a quantity of soldier's clothing" returned to Point of Fork to Elk's Hill, a plantation owned by Jefferson, thoroughly destroying the stores and wares, even to the point of slitting the throats of the horses on the plantation.

Von Steuben carried the large part of the blame for the abandonment of Point of Fork arsenal, to the point Virginia's General Assembly ordered an investigation into von Steuben's conduct. Von Steuben was adamant that the provisions and men were not as stated by the legislature, and given both the condition of his hurried preparations, the sudden arrival of Cornwallis, and his belief that the entire British army was nearby, von Steuben exasperation was summarized; "Every farmer is a general … but nobody wishes to be a soldier."

Further rising to the defense of von Steuben is the notable action of the 5th Virginia Regiment during the 1781 Virginia Campaign, despite the notable lack of clothing, muskets, bayonets/forks, and other equipment. Despite this, the 5th Virginia pushed to within 350 yards of the British lines at Yorktown before Cornwallis surrendered on October 19, 1781.
