= Virginia State Route 54 =

State highway in Hanover County, Virginia, US

State Route 54

Route information
- Maintained by VDOT
- Length: 18.67 mi (30.05 km)
- Existed: 1933–present

Major junctions
- West end: US 33 in Montpelier
- US 1 in Ashland; I-95 in Ashland
- East end: US 301 / SR 2 / SR 1004 in Hanover Courthouse

Location
- Country: United States
- State: Virginia
- Counties: Hanover

Highway system
- Virginia Routes; Interstate; US; Primary; Secondary; Byways; History; HOT lanes
← SR 53	→ SR 55

State Route 54 (SR 54) is a primary state highway in the U.S. state of Virginia. Known for most of its length as Patrick Henry Road, the state highway runs 18.67 miles (30.05 km) from U.S. Route 33 (US 33) in Montpelier east to US 301/SR 2 in Hanover Courthouse. SR 54 is the main east–west highway of Hanover County, connecting the western part of the county and the county seat with the central town of Ashland, where the highway meets US 1 and Interstate 95 (I-95).

== Route description ==
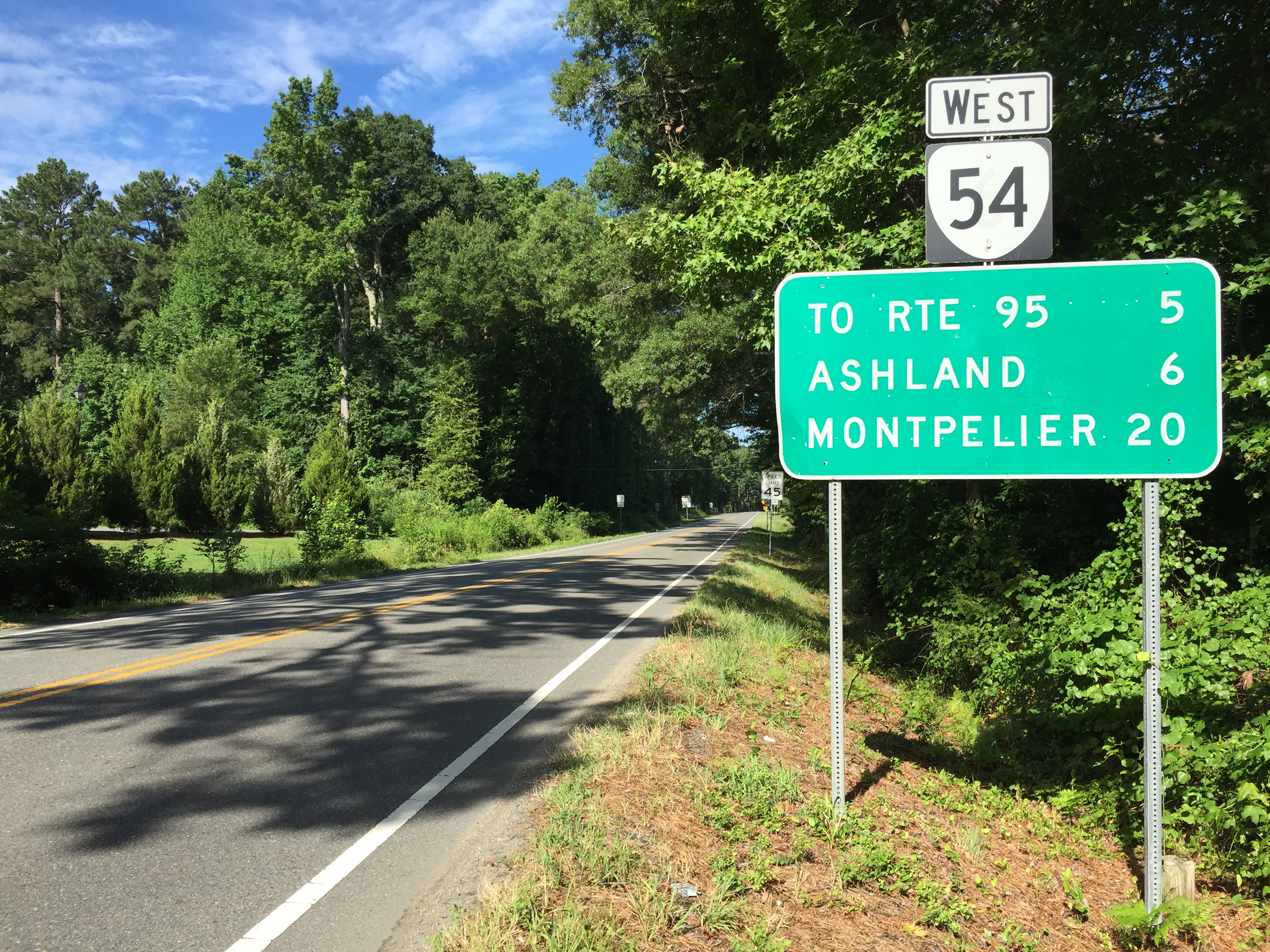
View west at the east end of SR 54 at US 301/SR 2 in Hanover Courthouse

SR 54 begins at an intersection with US 33 (Mountain Road) just east of Montpelier. The state highway heads east as two-lane Patrick Henry Road, which intersects Scotchtown Road. Scotchtown Road heads north toward Scotchtown, the estate of Patrick Henry. SR 54 heads southeast and crosses the South Anna River and Kings Pond, an impoundment of Falling Creek, before entering the town of Ashland, where the highway becomes Thompson Street. The state highway intersects CSX's RF&P Subdivision just south of the Ashland Amtrak station. SR 54 continues east as England Street, a three-lane road with center turn lane, and passes to the south of the campus of Randolph-Macon College. The state highway expands to a six-lane divided highway at US 1 (Washington Highway) and passes through a commercial area between the U.S. Highway and the state highway's partial cloverleaf interchange with I-95. East of the Interstate, SR 54 reduces to two lanes and leaves the town of Ashland, becoming Patrick Henry Road again. The state highway intersects CSX's Piedmont Subdivision before reaching its eastern terminus at US 301/SR 2 (Hanover Courthouse Highway) within the Hanover County Courthouse Historic District.

== Major intersections ==
The entire route is in Hanover County.

Location	mi	km	Destinations	Notes
	0.00	0.00	US 33 (Mountain Road) – Richmond, Harrisonburg	Western terminus
Ashland	12.45	20.04	US 1 (Washington Highway)	
Ashland	13.04	20.99	I-95 – Washington, Richmond	Exit 92 (I-95)
Hanover	18.67	30.05	US 301 / SR 2 (Hanover Courthouse Road) / SR 1004 (Fire House Road) – Fredericksburg, Bowling Green, Hanover, Hanover Tavern	Eastern terminus
1.000 mi = 1.609 km; 1.000 km = 0.621 mi
