= Battle of Hanover Court House =

Battle of the American Civil War

Coordinates: 37.7222°N 77.3763°W

- Part of the American Civil War
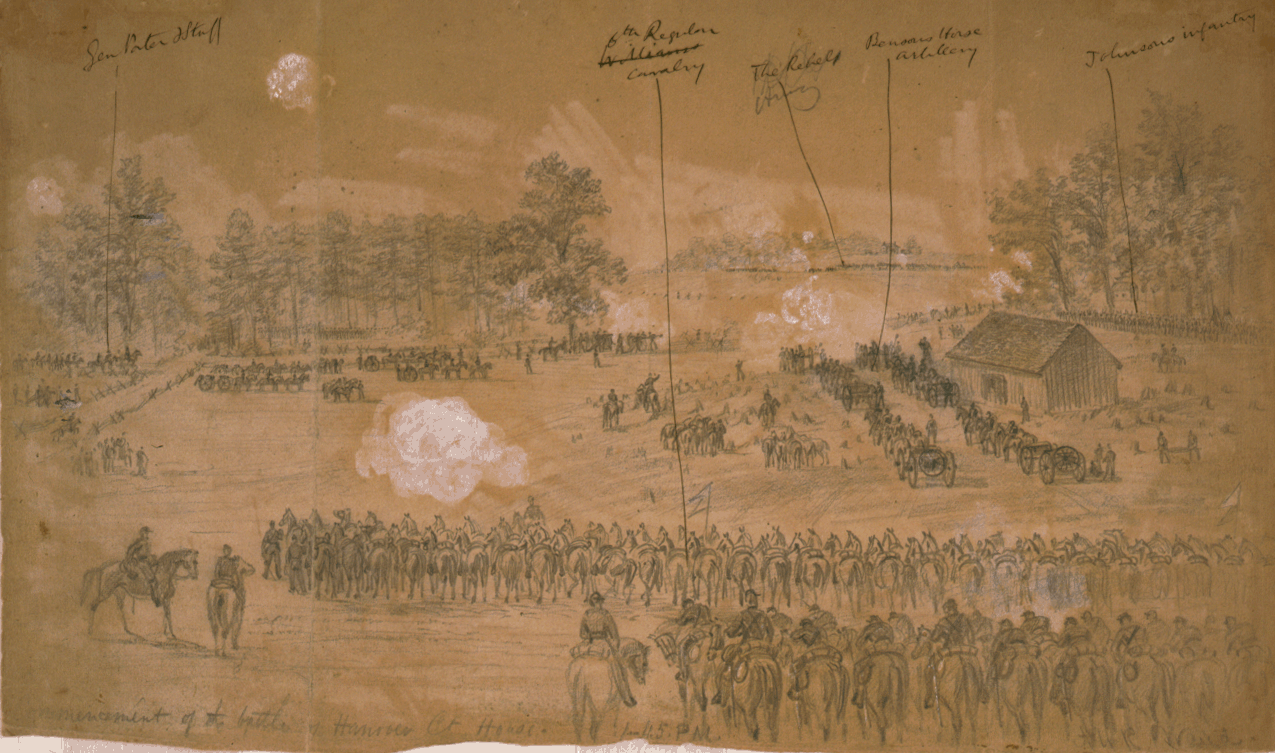
- Commencement of the battle of Hanover Ct. House. 1:45 PM. – Alfred R. Waud, artist, May 27, 1862.
Date	May 27, 1862
Location	Hanover County, Virginia
Result	Union victory

Belligerents
United States (Union)	(Confederate States of America) CSA (Confederacy)

Commanders and leaders
Fitz John Porter	Lawrence O'Bryan Branch

Strength
12,000	4,000

Casualties and losses
355–397	930

The Battle of Hanover Court House, also known as the Battle of Slash Church, took place on May 27, 1862, in Hanover County, Virginia, as part of the Peninsula Campaign of the American Civil War.

On May 27, 1862, elements of Union Brig. Gen. Fitz John Porter's V Corps extended north to protect the right flank of Maj. Gen. George B. McClellan's Army of the Potomac. Porter's objective was to deal with a Confederate force near Hanover Court House, which threatened the avenue of approach for Union reinforcements that were marching south from Fredericksburg. The smaller Confederate force, under Colonel Lawrence O'Bryan Branch, was defeated at Peake's Crossing after a disorganized fight.

However, the Union victory was moot since the Union reinforcements were recalled to Fredericksburg upon word of Maj. Gen. Nathaniel P. Banks's rout in the Shenandoah Valley at the First Battle of Winchester.

== Background ==
Confederate General Joseph E. Johnston withdrew his 60,000-man army from the Virginia Peninsula as McClellan's army pursued him and approached the Confederate capital of Richmond. Johnston's defensive line began at the James River at Drewry's Bluff, site of the recent Confederate naval victory, and extended counterclockwise so that his center and left were behind the Chickahominy River, a natural barrier in the spring when it turned the broad plains to the east of Richmond into swamps. Johnston's men burned most of the bridges over the Chickahominy and settled into strong defensive positions north and east of the city. For two reasons, McClellan positioned his 105,000-man army to focus on the northeast sector. Firstly, the Pamunkey River, which ran roughly parallel to the Chickahominy, offered a line of communication that could enable McClellan to get around Johnston's left flank. Secondly, McClellan anticipated the arrival of the I Corps under Maj. Gen. Irwin McDowell was scheduled to march south from Fredericksburg to reinforce his army, and thus, he needed to protect their avenue of approach.

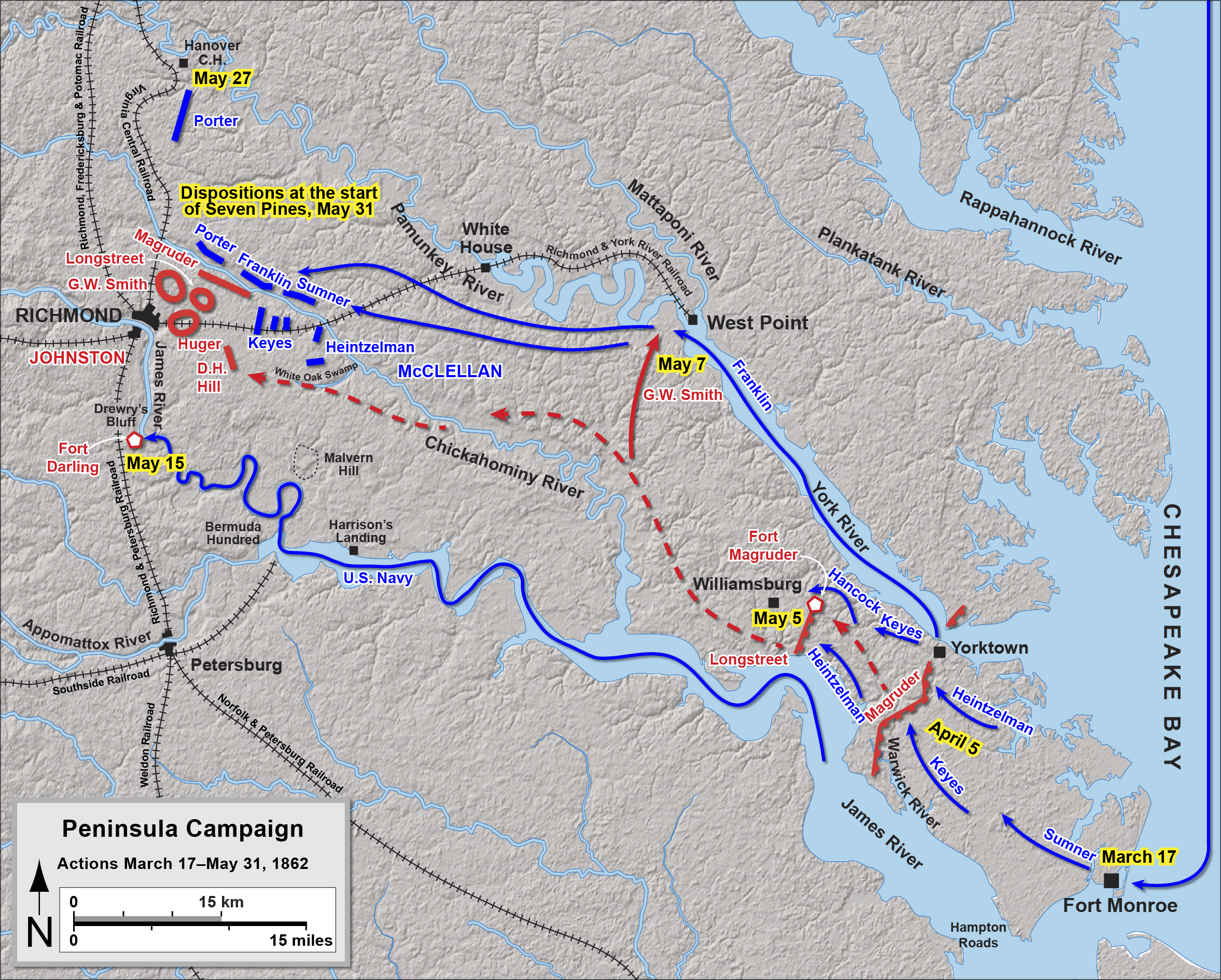
Peninsula Campaign, map of events up to the Battle of Seven Pines. Confederate Union

The Army of the Potomac pushed slowly up the Pamunkey and established supply bases at Eltham's Landing, Cumberland Landing, and White House Landing. White House, the plantation of W.H.F. "Rooney" Lee, son of General Robert E. Lee, became McClellan's base of operations. Using the Richmond and York River Railroad, McClellan could bring his heavy siege artillery to the outskirts of Richmond. He moved slowly and deliberately, reacting to faulty intelligence that made him believe the Confederates outnumbered him significantly. By the end of May, the army had built bridges across the Chickahominy and was facing Richmond, straddling the river, with one-third of the Army south of the river and two-thirds north. (This disposition, which made it difficult for one part of the army to reinforce the other quickly, would prove to be a significant problem in the upcoming Battle of Seven Pines).

While skirmishing occurred all along the line between the armies, McClellan heard a rumor from a Virginia civilian that a Confederate force of 17,000 was moving to Hanover Court House, north of Mechanicsville. If this were true, it would threaten the army's right flank and complicate the arrival of McDowell's reinforcements. A Union cavalry reconnaissance adjusted the estimate of the enemy strength to be 6,000, but it was still cause for concern. McClellan ordered his close friend, Maj. Gen. Fitz John Porter, commander of the newly formed V Corps, to deal with the threat.

Porter departed on his mission at 4 a.m. on May 27, 1862 with his 1st Division, under Brig. Gen. George W. Morell, the 3rd Brigade of Brig. Gen. George Sykes's 2nd Division, under Colonel Gouverneur K. Warren, and a composite brigade of cavalry and artillery led by Brig. Gen. William H. Emory, altogether about 12,000 men. The Confederate force, which numbered about 4,000 men, was led by Col. Lawrence O'Bryan Branch and included the 7th, 18th, 28th, and 37th North Carolina Infantry regiments and the 45th Georgia Infantry. They had departed from Gordonsville to guard the Virginia Central Railroad, taking up a position at Peake's Crossing, 4 miles (6.4 km) southwest of the courthouse, near Slash Church. Another Confederate brigade was stationed 10 miles (16 km) north at Hanover Junction.

== Battle ==
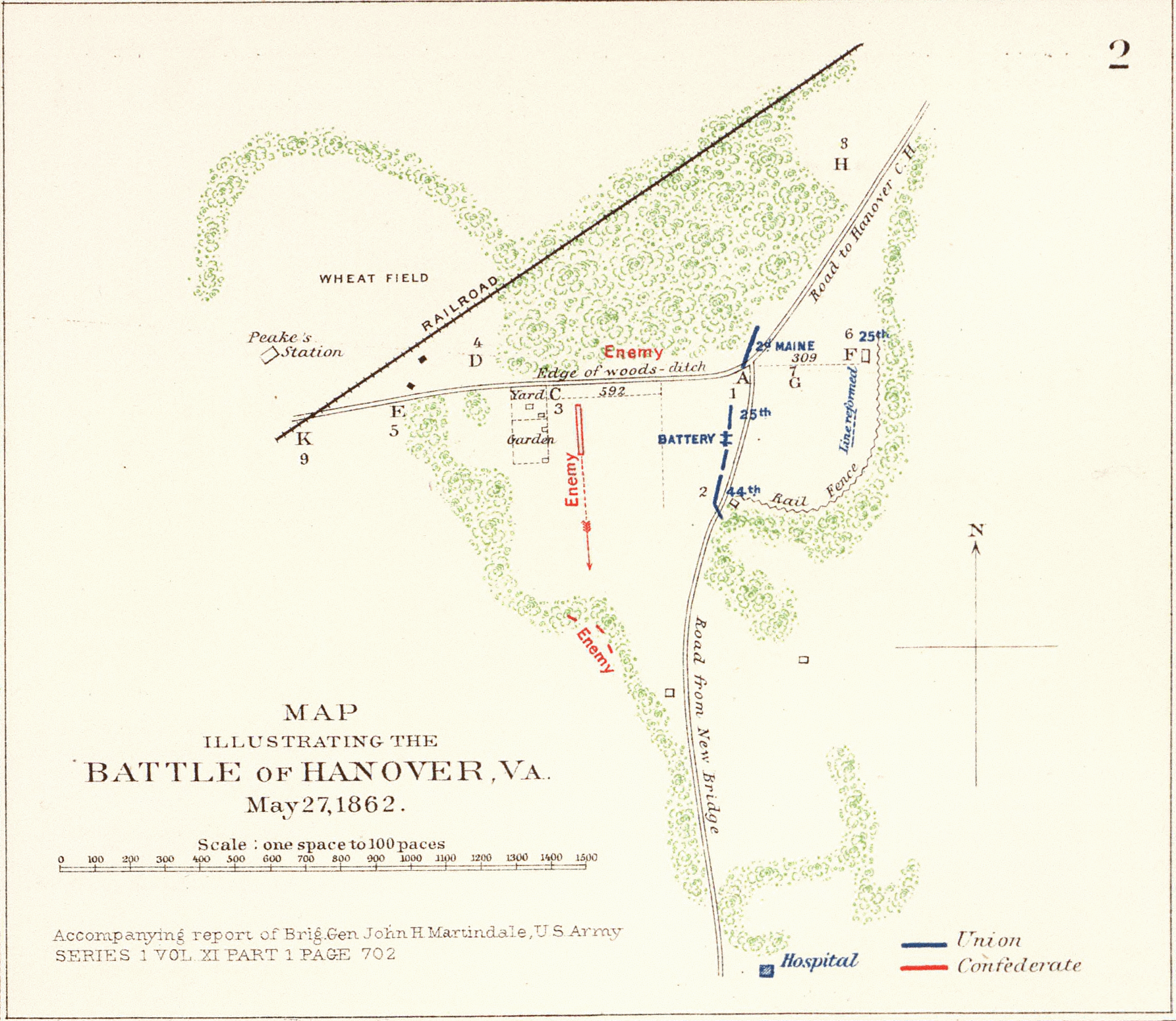
Map Illustrating the Battle of Hanover, Virginia.

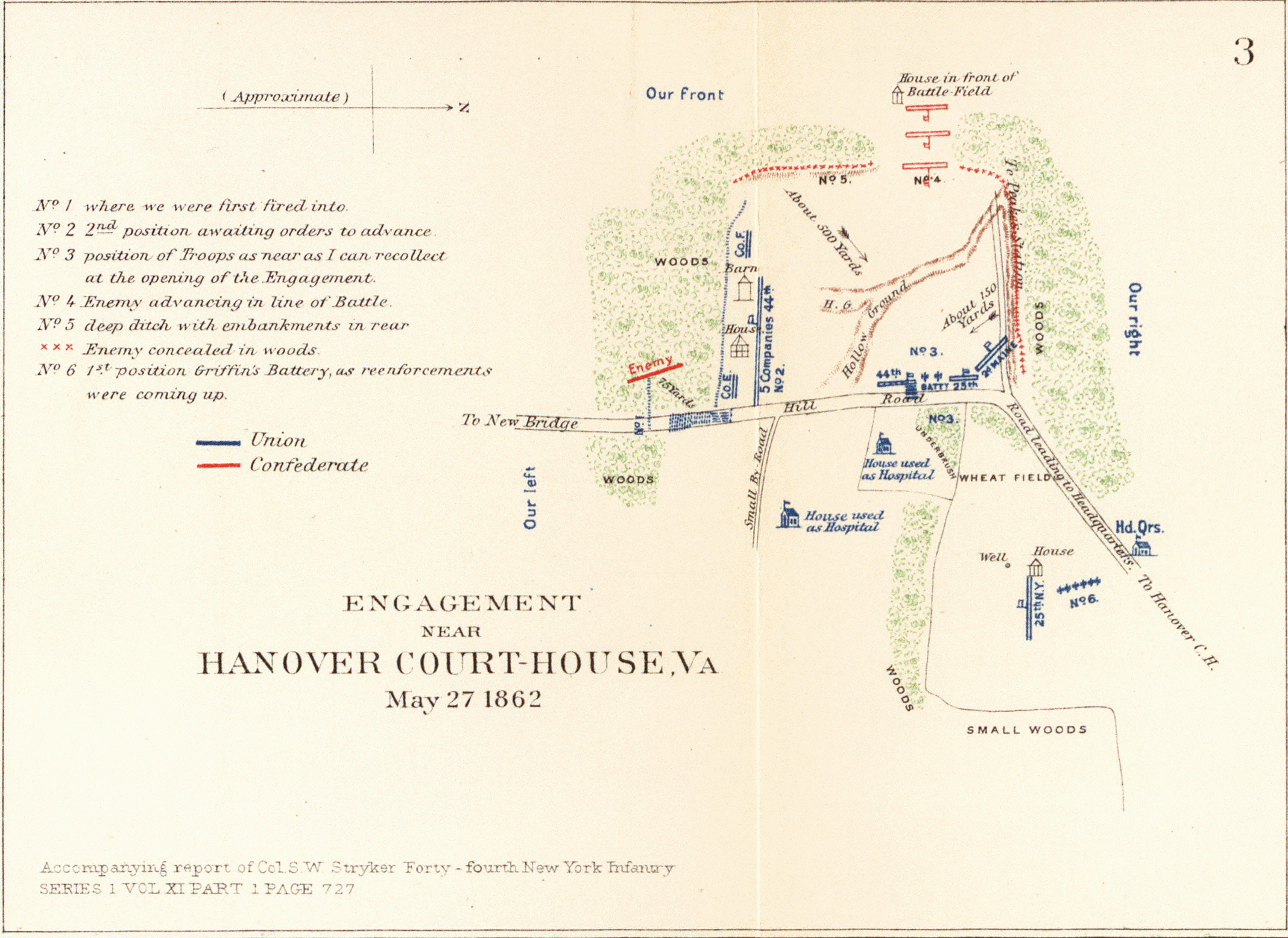
Engagement Near Hanover Court-House, Virginia.

Porter's men approached Peake's Crossing in a driving rain. At about noon on May 27, 1862, his lead element, the 25th New York Infantry, encountered Col. James H. Lane's 28th North Carolina on a reconnaissance patrol at the farm owned by Dr. Thomas H. Kinney. The New Yorkers, along with the 1st U.S. Sharpshooters, skirmished briskly with the Confederates until Porter's main body arrived, driving the outnumbered Rebels up the road in the direction of the courthouse. Porter set out in pursuit with most of his force, leaving three regiments (the 2nd Maine, the 44th New York, and the damaged 25th New York) under the command of Brig. Gen. John H. Martindale, to guard the New Bridge and Hanover Court House Roads intersection, a mile test of Kinney's farm. This movement exposed the rear of Porter's command to attack by the bulk of Branch's force, which Porter had mistakenly assumed was at Hanover Court House.

Branch also made the poor assumption that Porter's force was significantly smaller than it was, so he attacked. Col. Charles C. Lee led his regiment, the 37th North Carolina, along with the 18th North Carolina and two cannons from Latham's Battery. An initial assault by the 18th was repulsed, but the heavy fire almost destroyed Martindale's force when the 37th joined in. The 44th New York suffered 25% casualties, and its battle flag received 44 bullet holes.

When messengers reached Porter with news of the engagement, he quickly dispatched the 9th Massachusetts and 62nd Pennsylvania regiments back to Kinney Farm. The Confederate line broke under the weight of thousands of new troops, and they retreated through Peake's Crossing to Ashland.

== Aftermath ==
General McClellan claimed that Hanover Court House was yet another "glorious victory over superior numbers" and judged it "one of the handsomest things of the war." However, the reality was that superior (Union) numbers won the day in a disorganized fight characterized by misjudgments on both sides. The right flank of the Union Army remained secure, although technically, the Confederates at Peake's Crossing had not intended to threaten it. Also, McDowell's Corps did not need its roads kept clear because it never arrived; the defeat of Union forces at the First Battle of Winchester by Stonewall Jackson in the Shenandoah Valley caused the Lincoln administration to recall McDowell to Fredericksburg. The estimates of Union casualties vary, from 355 (62 killed, 233 wounded, 70 captured) to 397. The Confederates left 200 dead and wounded on the field, and Porter's cavalry captured 730.

A more significant impact than the actual casualties, according to historian Stephen W. Sears, was the effect on McClellan's preparedness for the next major battle, at Seven Pines and Fair Oaks four days later. During the absence of Porter, McClellan was reluctant to move more of his troops south of the Chickahominy, which made his left flank a more attractive target for Johnston.
