= French Hay Plantation =

Historic building in Virginia, US

- French Hay
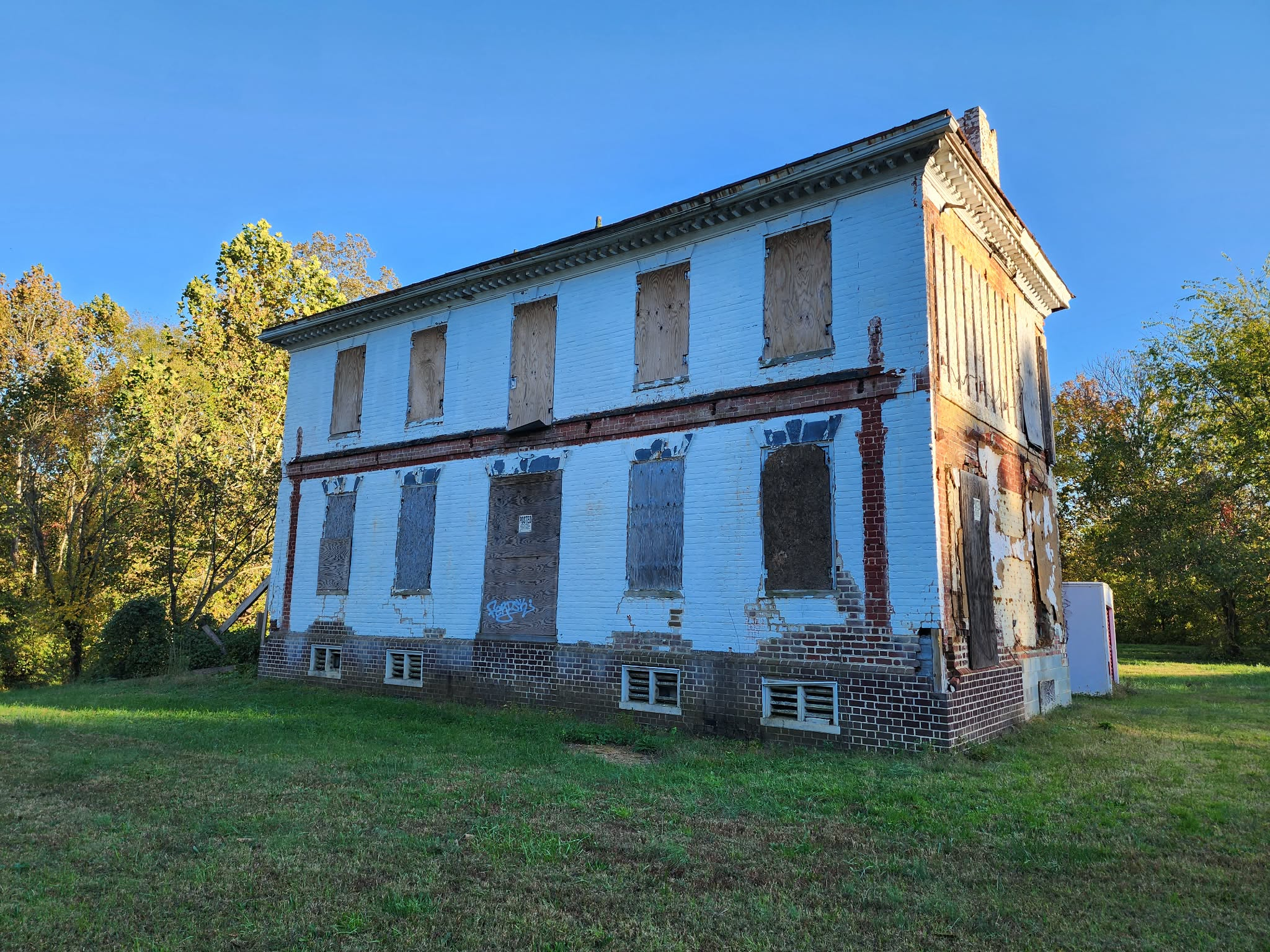
- The front of French Hay as it stands in October, 2025.

- Location within Virginia Location within the United States
- Nearest city: Hanover, Virginia
- Coordinates: 37°40′49.6″N 77°27′20.9″W
- Built: 1735
- Part of: Hanover County

French Hay is a historic plantation house located in Hanover County, Virginia. Believed to have been constructed in the early 18th century, it has been identified in historic surveys and late-19th-century maps as a named landmark. It has been the subject of newspaper coverage highlighting its architectural character and historical associations.

Though privately owned, the property has been unoccupied in recent years and has drawn attention through historical research and documentation related to its architectural characteristics, land use history, and associations with Hanover County's early settlement patterns.

== History ==
French Hay is traditionally associated with events of the American Revolutionary War. According to historic surveys and local historical tradition, the plantation is said to have served as a headquarters for Gilbert du Motier, Marquis de Lafayette, during his 1781 Virginia campaign while maneuvering against British forces under Charles Cornwallis. Local tradition further holds that, following his return to France, Lafayette sent hay seed back to the property; the resulting crop was reportedly shared among neighboring farms, leading to the name “French Hay.”

The plantation was built on land historically associated with Thomas Sumter, an officer of the American Revolutionary War. Historical accounts indicate that Sumter was born on the estate, though sources differ as to whether his birthplace was the main house or another dwelling formerly located on the property.

An early 19th-century reference identifies French Hay as a residential homestead; a published institutional history notes that James Henry Couch was born there on August 3, 1821, describing the site as “the old homestead known as ‘French Hay’” in Hanover County, Virginia.

By the late 19th century, French Hay was sufficiently established as a named place to be used as a mailing address. An 1868 advertisement in the Banner of the South, published in Augusta, Georgia, listed “French Hay, Hanover Co., Va.” as the contact address for a teacher seeking employment. The name also appears on an 1892 U.S. Geological Survey topographic map of the Richmond area, indicating its recognition as a geographic landmark.

From 1855 to 1866, French Hay was occupied by Thomas J. Woolridge, a physician who constructed a one-story frame medical office within the yard of the house. Such detached professional offices were common on 19th-century Virginia plantations, though few survive today. In September 1856, a detailed map of the property, then comprising 317 acres, was prepared by cartographer T. M. L. Ladd, documenting the scale and agricultural use of the estate. A contemporaneous advertisement published in the Richmond Dispatch in October 1862 listed “French Hay, Hanover County” as Woolridge's address while seeking an overseer for the farm, indicating continued agricultural operation during the Civil War.

During the American Civil War, troop movements affected much of Hanover County. Local records indicate that in June 1862, Confederate forces camped on or near the French Hay property while moving toward engagements later associated with the Cold Harbor campaign.

The property's association with Civil War–era military geography persisted into the early 20th century. A 1915 article in The Cadet, published by the Virginia Military Institute, described an annual corps hike retracing Civil War battlefields, noting that a battalion established its first camp at French Hay before marching onward toward Cold Harbor by way of Gaines’ Mill.

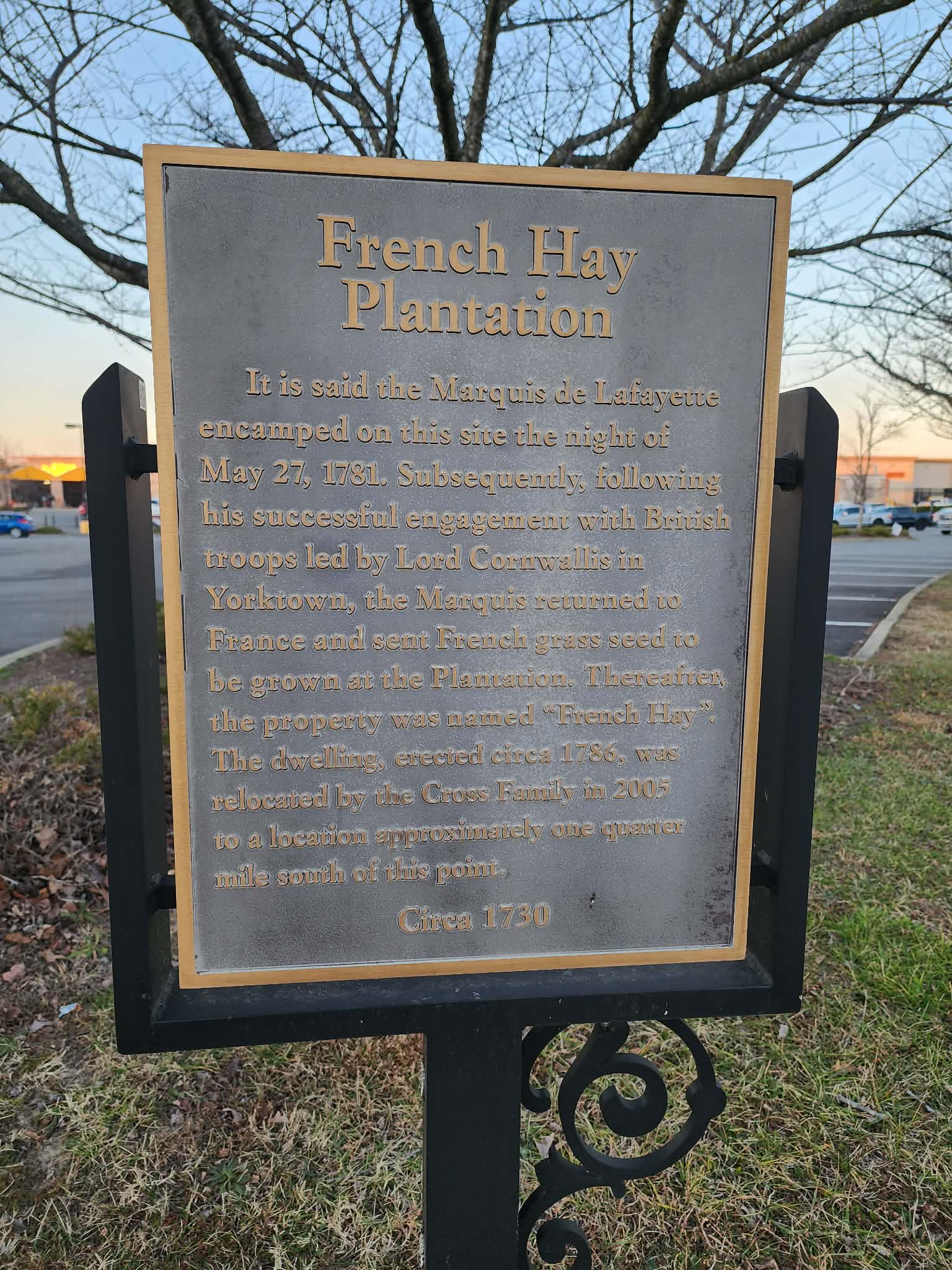
Commemorative Plaque placed where French Hay formerly stood prior to being moved in 2005.

In the mid-20th century, French Hay was the residence of Leon M. Bazile, who served as a judge of Virginia's Fifteenth Judicial Circuit from 1941 to 1965. In 1959, Bazile presided over Loving v. Virginia, in which he upheld Virginia's laws prohibiting interracial marriage. The ruling was later unanimously overturned by the United States Supreme Court in 1967, invalidating race-based restrictions on marriage nationwide.

Local records indicate that the Cross family acquired French Hay in 1971 from Bela Outlaw and her sister, Mrs. W. R. McGeorge. That same year, the property was included among the historic homes open to the public during Virginia's Historic Garden Week. By this period, the original plantation acreage had been reduced from several hundred acres to approximately 30 acres.

According to independent local reports, the house was relocated in 2005 approximately a quarter-mile south of its original site to accommodate nearby commercial development, including the construction of a Home Depot. During the move, the east and west wings were removed, leaving only the original central structure.

The site of the house's original location is marked by a commemorative plaque summarizing the property's traditional association with Lafayette and noting the building's relocation in 2005.

== Architecture ==
As documented in photographs taken in 2025, French Hay is a two-story brick and timber plantation house exhibiting features typical of early Colonial-era construction in Virginia. The building has a symmetrical façade, and two original brick chimneys remain. The oldest portion of the house consists of six rooms: two located in an English basement and two rooms on each of the upper floors, arranged around a central hall. The exterior walls of the original structure are constructed of brick approximately two feet thick.

During the relocation of the building in 2005, the east and west wings, additions dating to the 20th century, were removed. The remaining structure represents the original central portion of the house, which is believed to date to the early 18th century.

== Current Condition ==
As of 2025, the French Hay structure remains unoccupied and has not undergone restoration. Observations from the exterior indicate multiple openings in the roof, and portions of the eastern exterior brick wall are supported by temporary wooden bracing.

The property remains in private ownership. While French Hay has been referenced in historical research and documentation, no publicly announced restoration or preservation plans were in place as of 2025.
