= Slash Church =

Historic church in Virginia, United States

- U.S. National Register of Historic Places
- Virginia Landmarks Register
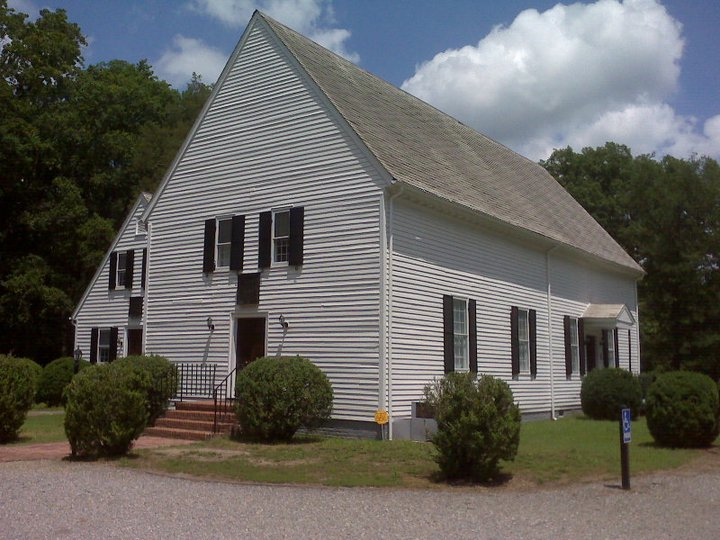
- The church in 2013

- Location within Virginia Location within the United States
- Location: VA 656, N of jct. with VA 657, near Ashland, Virginia
- Coordinates: 37°43′07″N 77°24′54″W
- Area: 10 acres (4.0 ha)
- Built: 1729
- NRHP reference No.: 72001399
- VLR No.: 042-0033

Significant dates
- Added to NRHP: September 22, 1972
- Designated VLR: August 15, 1972

Slash Church, also known as the Upper Church-St. Paul's Parish is a historic Disciples of Christ Church, formerly an Anglican/Episcopal church located at 11353 Mt. Hermon Road, Ashland, Hanover County, Virginia. Built of southern yellow pine cut from the property in 1729–30, it is the oldest frame house of worship still in use in Virginia.

== History ==
Slash Church was built under the direction of Edward Chambers and Thomas Pinchbeck in 1729, five years after the absentee minister (who remained in England but hired a curate to serve Hanover County, Virginia boundaries declared 1720), informed the bishop of London that the parish was 60 miles long and twelve wide and served 1200 families by means of four churches (the priest alternating between them on the various Sundays of the month). St. Martin's Parish was also set off from St. Paul's parish in 1727. The predecessor building (sometimes known as the "Mechumps Creek Chapel"), built circa 1702, was about a mile and a half north of this structure. Current research indicates it was located behind the current Hanover Tavern across the tracks and up a hill where there is a good source of water (pond). No structure currently exists of this chapel. The Slash name derives from the "slashes" – ravines that formed in the sandy clay soil after rainstorms plus the Pine Slash trees. This terrain has a high ground water level so it was important to place this structure on a hill.

Rev. George Whitfield, founding Methodist Francis Asbury, Virginia Baptist Reuben Ford and Disciples of Christ founder Alexander Campbell are believed to have preached at the church during their various missionary tours. Because Rev. Patrick Henry (uncle to the founding father Patrick Henry) served as minister of St. Paul's Parish for four decades (1737–1777), his nephew did occasionally attend the church. However, Patrick Henry's mother was a dissenter, and he is known to have attended Polegreen Church (a Presbyterian or freethinking meetinghouse) nearby. Dolley Madison and Henry Clay are also believed to have attended this church.

Rev. Henry's successor, Rev. Talley, became a Universalist and after the American Revolutionary War, the Anglican church was disestablished (i.e. no longer supported by taxes) and the building variously abandoned or used by various denominations, including Methodists and Disciples of Christ, and as a school. The latter denomination purchased the property in 1842, two years after the Episcopal congregation built a brick church about four miles away which burned on a December evening and then constructed another church of wood in the 1850s revival style which continues in their use for weekly services to the present day.

During the American Civil War, on May 26–27, 1862, Confederate Brigadier General Lawrence O'Bryan Branch (a former U.S. Representative from North Carolina who would die six months later at the Battle of Antietam) used it as his headquarters with 4500 soldiers (and later as a hospital, together with three local homes). Two battles sometimes collectively called the "Battle of Slash Church" were Union victories, although the Peninsular Campaign failed. When old trees were cut down in the 1950s, bullets were found, believed to be from those battles.

Slash celebrates its history with an event on the grounds every five years. Most recently, the church celebrated its 285th anniversary on September 14, 2014. The public is invited to attend services and events and schedule historic tours.

== Architecture ==
The one-story, steep gable roofed, white clapboarded frame building measures approximately 60 feet, 6 inches, by 26 feet, 6 inches. It was built from timber felled on the property – Southern Yellow pine usually 120 feet tall – and fastened mostly with wooden pegs. The exterior pine clapboards on three sides are original. Some of the original wood clapboards on the north side were replaced in a Jan. 1970 exterior boiler fire and the wainscoting (interior) on that same side was partly replaced, leaving the wainscoting on the other side intact. This is a special feature of this building since it runs horizontal in wide boards instead of vertical. Original wavy glass remains in several original wood framed windows which have exterior storm (1950's) windows. The gallery at the back of the sanctuary is original as are the pillars holding it in place and the railings plus the stairs. Construction of this feature can be viewed under the stairs by a door on the first floor. Plus are two original slat constructed benches. Other old furniture dates to the 1850s: a heavy solid dark stained pulpit, an oval table used for communion, two tall backed padded seat chairs, and various styles of wooden bench seats. The 1970s fire produced so much smoke in the floor area the fire crew cut away the floor only to discover an additional floor (the 2nd floor was added by the builders because the 1st floor was too low.) The fire crew also removed the 1st floor and as it was bitterly cold (water froze from the fire hoses) this wood was used as a bonfire until members rescued it to help defray restoration costs by making furniture and small items for sale. Some of these items are available to see in the history room at the church. When the fire crew took away both floors, they discovered four graves of unknown people (still unknown today). The 2nd floor had blood on it from the 1862 occupation of Gen. Branch as bleeding men lay while being treated for the civil war battle. Additional structures: a Sunday School building with a bathroom was built to resemble the church and connected by a passageway from an exterior door already in place. This was important because it did not affect the historic designation as it did not alter the church building. In the 1970s, a fellowship hall and more Sunday school space was erected across the parking lot of brick to serve the congregation's needs. It was listed on the National Register of Historic Places in 1972.

In 1998, a historical highway marker – E105 – was located at the corner of and intersection that has 4 names: Peakes, Ashcake, Sliding Hill and Mt. Hermon Rd., the latter being the address of the church (11353 Mt. Hermon Rd.).
