= W. Duncan Lee =

American architect (1884–1952)

- Born: Duncan Lee; July 2, 1884; Ashland, Virginia, U.S.
- Died: March 13, 1952 (aged 67); Richmond, Virginia, U.S.
- Resting place: Hollywood Cemetery
- Occupation: Architect
- Spouse: Elizabeth Marbury Everett
- Children: 1

W. Duncan Lee (July 2, 1884 – March 13, 1952) was an American architect working primarily in the style of Colonial Revival who designed and built the majority of his structures in the city of Richmond, Virginia, and its environs.

== Biography ==
Duncan Lee was born on July 2, 1884, in Ashland, Virginia, to Martha (née Gatch) and Clifton Lee. He attended public schools in Ashland and Richmond. The "W" in Lee's name was merely added after Lee found his name too brief compared to other architects such as John Russell Pope, William Lawrence Bottomley, and Alfred Charles Bossom.

He studied under George R. Tolman at the Massachusetts Institute of Technology. After graduating, from 1906 to 1908 he was a partner of Marion J. Dimmock in the architect firm Dimmock & Lee. In 1910, he opened his own firm in Richmond. Among Lee's noted works in the capital city of the State of Virginia and its surrounds are the Tuckahoe Apartments (1928–29), the Evelynton mansion on the Evelynton Plantation (1937), Westbourne (designed in 1915- built in 1919), and a wing of the Virginia Executive Mansion (1908). Also, in 1929, Lee was responsible for the restoration of the Old Custom House in Yorktown, Virginia. He supervised the restoration of Carter's Grove. He was a charter member of Company C and Company D of the Richmond Light Infantry Blues. He was a member of the Commonwealth Club, the Country Club of Virginia and the old Westmoreland Club. He was on the advisory board of architects for Colonial Williamsburg. Lee claimed to have designed 300 homes in Richmond and requested his records be destroyed after his death. He designed residential buildings in a variety of styles, such as Colonial Revival, Georgian, Tudor, Italian Renaissance, and Arts and Crafts.

Lee married Elizabeth Marbury Everett. They had a son Everett. He designed his own home on Stonehurst Green in Richmond. He died on March 13, 1952, at a hospital in Richmond. He was buried in Hollywood Cemetery.
