= Old Custom House (Yorktown, Virginia) =

Historic building in Virginia, US

- U.S. National Register of Historic Places
- Virginia Landmarks Register
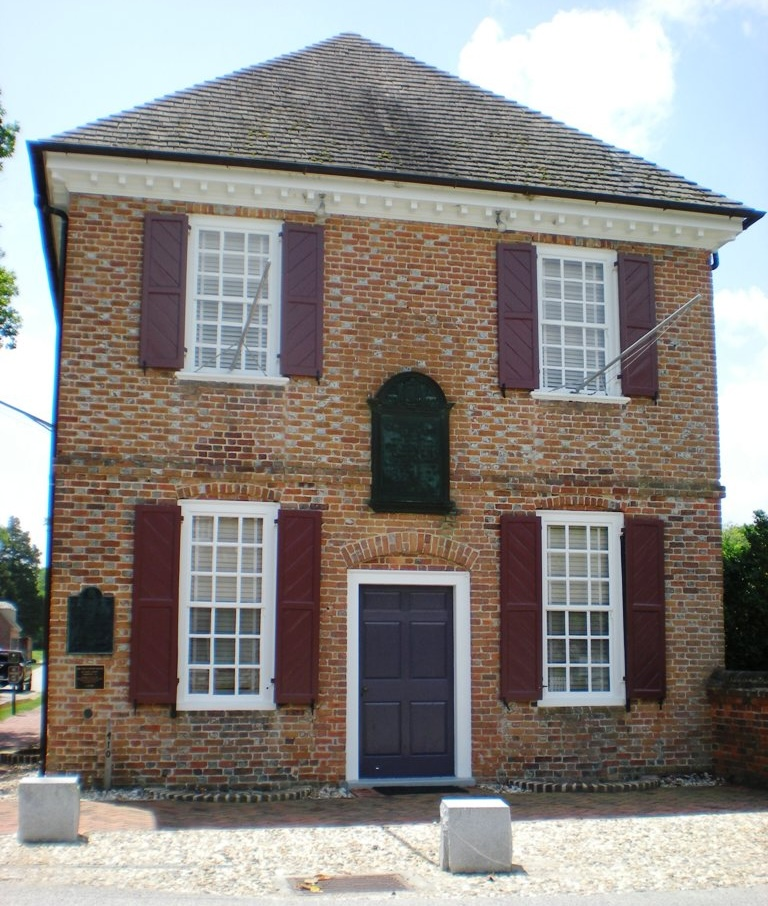
- The Old Custom House in 2009

- Location within Virginia Location within the United States
- Location: Jct. of Main and Read Sts., Yorktown, Virginia
- Coordinates: 37°14′3″N 76°30′29″W
- Area: 1.5 acres (0.61 ha)
- Built: 1721
- Architectural style: Colonial; Late 19th and 20th Century Revivals
- NRHP reference No.: 99000682
- VLR No.: 099-0004

Significant dates
- Added to NRHP: June 3, 1999
- Designated VLR: March 17, 1999

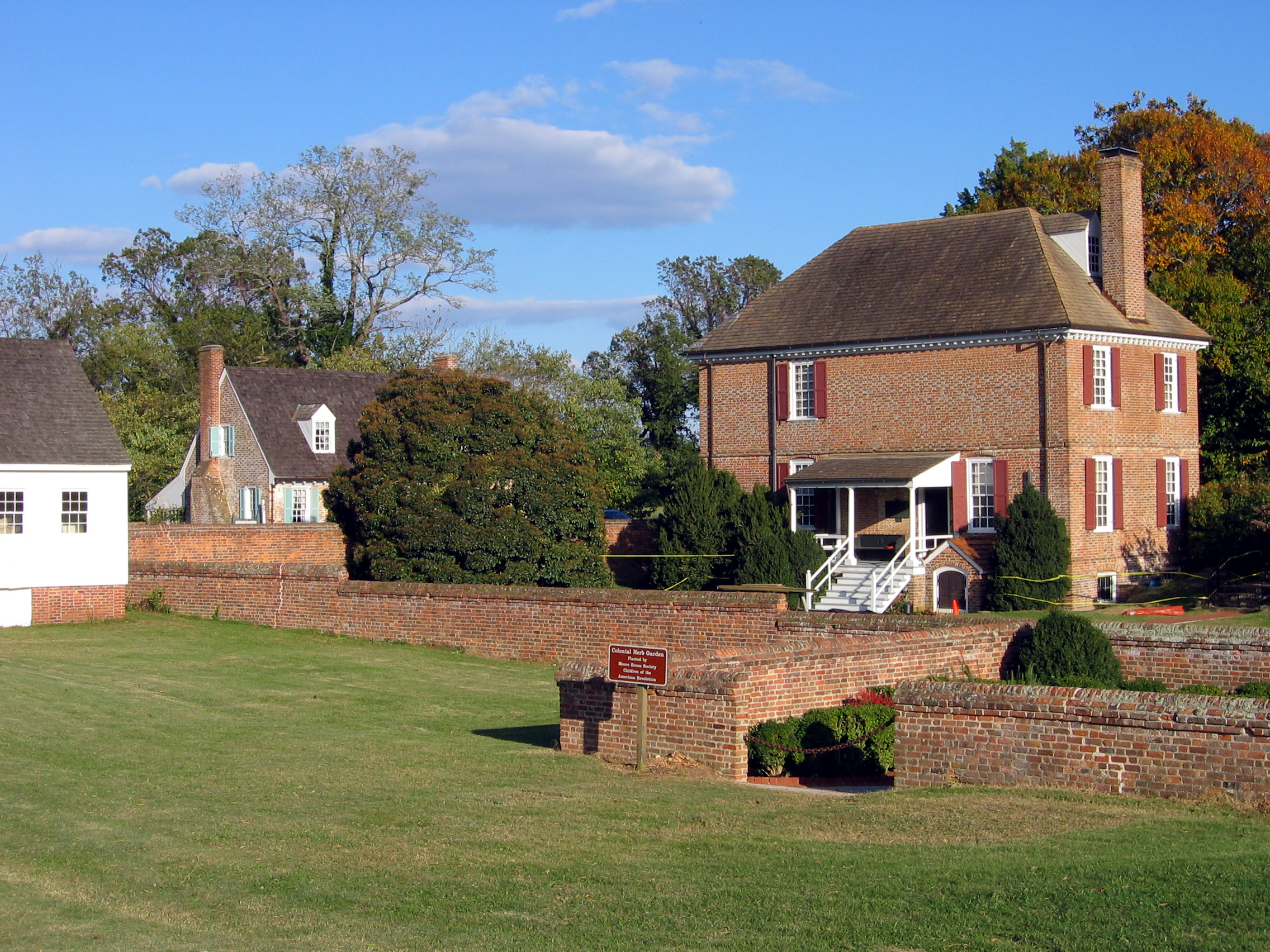
The customhouse in 2006

The Old Custom House is a historic customs house and museum located in Yorktown, Virginia, within York County, Virginia. Built in 1721, it is a two‑and‑a‑half‑story brick structure exhibiting characteristic features of early eighteenth‑century American colonial architecture. The building historically served as a customs inspection point for maritime trade along the York River, reflecting Yorktown’s role as a major port town during the colonial period.

== History ==
Yorktown developed in the early eighteenth century as one of Virginia’s principal tobacco ports, and customs inspection facilities were essential to regulating exports and imports. The Old Custom House, constructed in 1721, supported this commercial activity during the town’s period of economic prominence. The building appears in the Historic American Buildings Survey as an example of Yorktown’s colonial commercial infrastructure.

Yorktown’s decline as a major port in the nineteenth century reduced the building’s commercial role, and by the early twentieth century it had become a historic property rather than an active customs facility.

== Architecture ==
The Old Custom House is a brick, two‑and‑a‑half‑story Colonial structure with a steep hipped roof, Flemish‑bond brickwork, and a corbeled interior end chimney. Its symmetrical façade and restrained detailing are characteristic of early eighteenth‑century Virginia civic architecture.

Contributing resources added during the 1929 restoration include a detached kitchen, a brick necessary, and a perimeter brick wall.

== Restoration and preservation ==
An extensive restoration was undertaken in 1929 under Richmond architect W. Duncan Lee, a prominent figure in Virginia’s Colonial Revival movement. Lee’s work stabilized the structure and added historically inspired outbuildings to evoke an eighteenth‑century domestic complex.

The property was listed on the Virginia Landmarks Register in March 1999 and added to the National Register of Historic Places on June 3, 1999.

== Current use ==
The Old Custom House is operated as a museum by the Comte de Grasse Chapter of the Daughters of the American Revolution with maintenance funded through donations, gift shop sales, and chapter dues. Exhibits interpret Yorktown’s colonial economy, maritime trade, and architectural history. The museum is open to the public on Sundays from June through October.
