= Evelynton =

Historic house in Virginia, United States

- U.S. National Register of Historic Places
- Virginia Landmarks Register
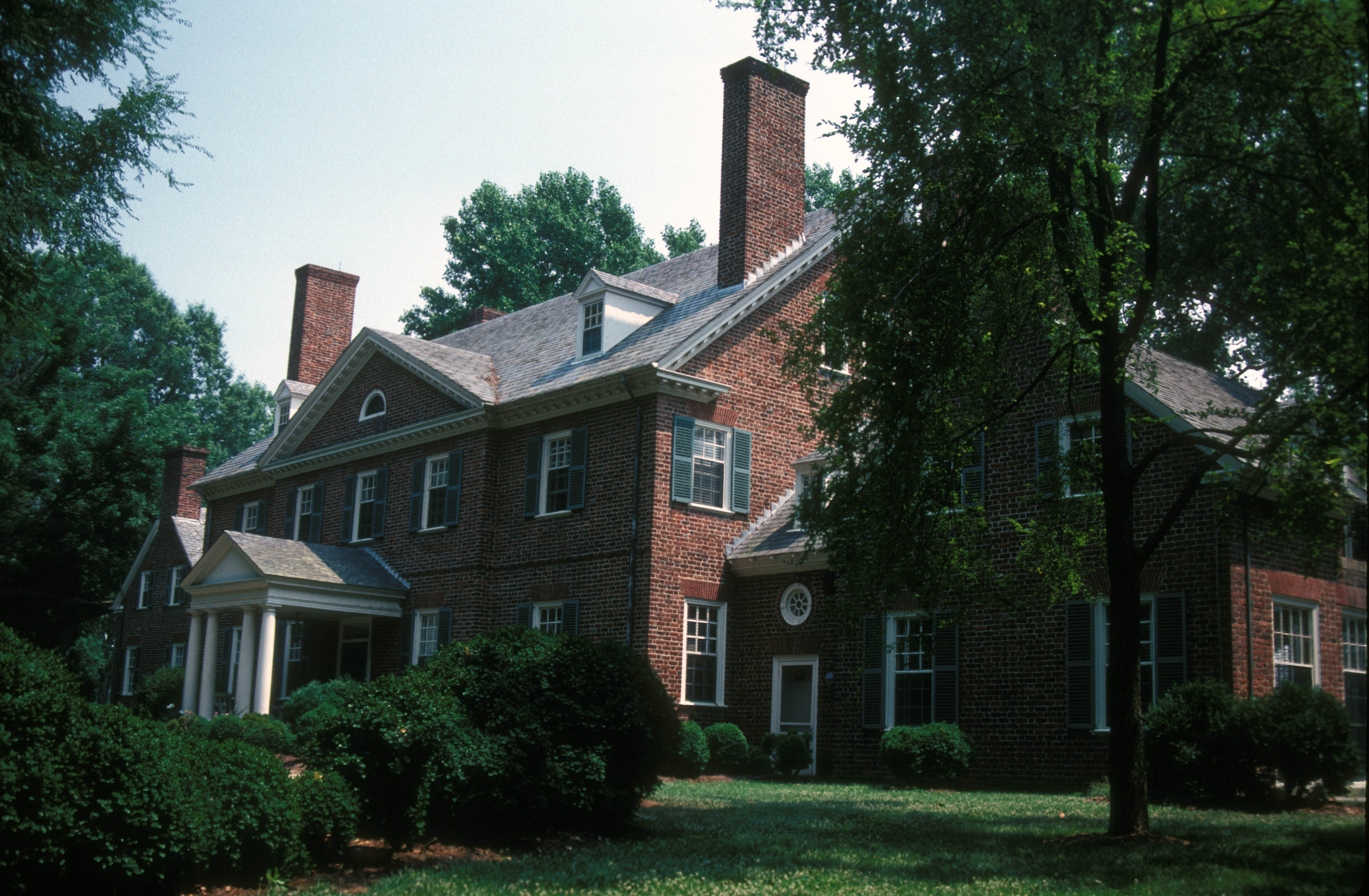
- Evelynton, January 2013

- Location within Virginia Location within the United States
- Location: VA 5 E of VA 609, Charles City, Virginia
- Coordinates: 37°19′48″N 77°09′16″W
- Area: 48 acres (19 ha)
- Built: 1937
- Architect: Lee, W. Duncan
- Architectural style: Colonial Revival
- NRHP reference No.: 89000486
- VLR No.: 018-0064

Significant dates
- Added to NRHP: August 17, 1989
- Designated VLR: June 21, 1988

Evelynton is a historic home near Charles City, Charles City County, in the U.S. state of Virginia. It was built in 1937, and is a two-story, seven-bay, brick dwelling in the Colonial Revival style. It has a gable roof with dormers, and flanking dependencies connected to the main house by hyphens. Also on the property is a contributing frame servants' quarters. It was designed and built under the supervision of the prominent architect W. Duncan Lee (1884–1952).

It was added to the National Register of Historic Places in 1989.

== History ==
Originally part of William Byrd II's expansive Westover Plantation and named for Byrd's daughter, Evelyn, Evelynton has been home to the Ruffin family since 1847.

The family patriarch, Edmund Ruffin, is often credited with firing the first shot of the Civil War at Fort Sumter. His earlier agricultural contributions, from scientific soil testing to the publication of The Farmer's Register helped rescue 19th-century Virginia from a declining agricultural economy, and earned him the title "father of American agronomy."

Evelynton was the site of fierce Civil War skirmishes in 1862, when General George McClellan waged his destructive Peninsula Campaign; J.E.B. Stuart, Stonewall Jackson and John Pelham led the Southern offensive in the Battle of Evelynton Heights.

The original house and out-buildings were burned during that conflict, and the current residence was erected two generations later by Edmund Ruffin's great grandson, John Augustine Ruffin Jr. and his wife Mary Ball Saunders. In 1937, Ruffin contracted architect W. Duncan Lee to build a new house. Lee had completed a restoration of Carters Grove in Williamsburg, overseen the expansion of the Virginia Governor's mansion, and designed fourteen of the stately homes along Monument Avenue. Lee's Colonial Revival mansion was built near the earlier house. The Lee-designed mansion is listed on the National Register of Historic Places. The mansion and grounds were sold out of the Ruffin family after the death of Mr. Edmund Ruffin Saunders. The 2,500 acres (1,000 ha) farm is still family-owned and operated.
