= Hanover County Municipal Airport =

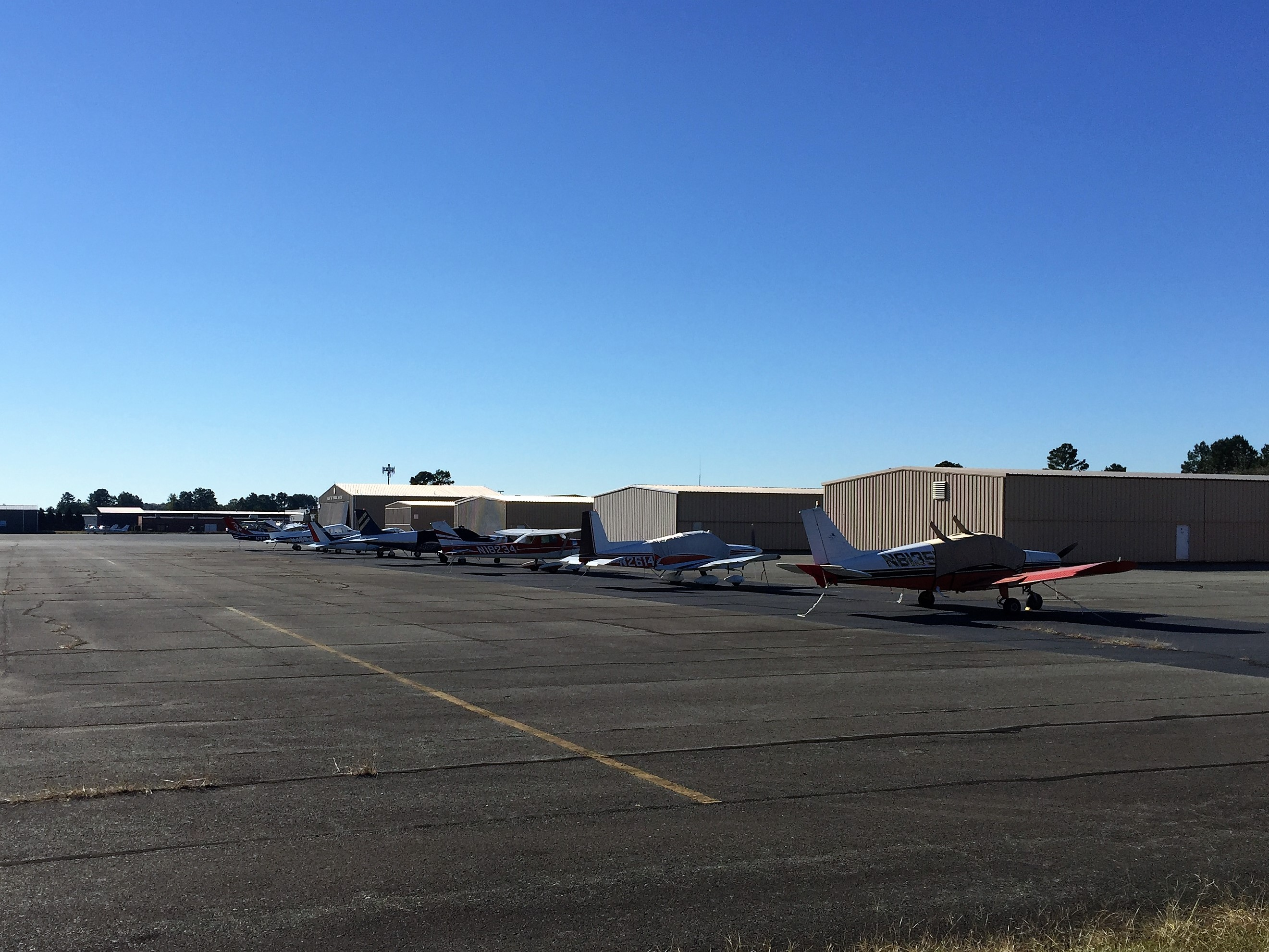
- Planes and buildings at the Hanover County Municipal Airport, 2018
- IATA: none; ICAO: KOFP; FAA LID: OFP

Summary
- Airport type: Public
- Owner: Hanover County
- Serves: Richmond / Ashland, Virginia
- Location: Ashland, Virginia
- Elevation AMSL: 207 ft (63 m)
- Coordinates: 37°42′32″N 077°26′11″W
- Website: www.co.hanover.va.us/...
- Interactive map of Hanover County Municipal Airport

Runways
Direction	Length		Surface
Direction	ft	m	Surface
16/34	5,402	1,647	Asphalt

Statistics (2018)
- Aircraft operations: 36,165
- Based aircraft: 102
- Source: Federal Aviation Administration

Hanover County Municipal Airport (ICAO: KOFP, FAA LID: OFP) is a public airport located 14 miles (22 km) north of the central business district of Richmond, Virginia, and 5 miles (8 km) south of Ashland, Virginia, United States. It is owned by Hanover County in Virginia.

This airport uses the three-letter location identifier code "OFP" which is assigned by the FAA; however, there is no three-letter location identifier code from IATA. The four-letter location identifier code "KOFP" is assigned by ICAO.

The hours of operations are 0700 to 2000 (7am to 8pm) from April to September, and 0700 to 1900 (7am to 7pm) from October to March. All times are for the US Eastern Time Zone.

== Facilities and aircraft ==
Hanover County Municipal Airport has an area of 259 acres (105 ha), which contains one asphalt paved runway (16/34) measuring 5,402 x 100 ft (1,647 x 30 m).

For the 12-month period ending December 31, 2018, the airport had 36,165 aircraft operations, an average of 99 per day. There were 102 aircraft based at this airport, 93 single engine, 5 multi-engine, 2 jet aircraft and 2 helicopter.

There is a full-service fixed-base operator (FBO) called Heart of Virginia Aviation. The county is building a new hangar, renovating the terminal and is updating fencing. There are an industrial park and a commerce center next to the airport.
