= Hanover County Courthouse =

Historic courthouse in Virginia, US

- U.S. National Register of Historic Places
- U.S. National Historic Landmark
- U.S. Historic district – Contributing property
- Virginia Landmarks Register
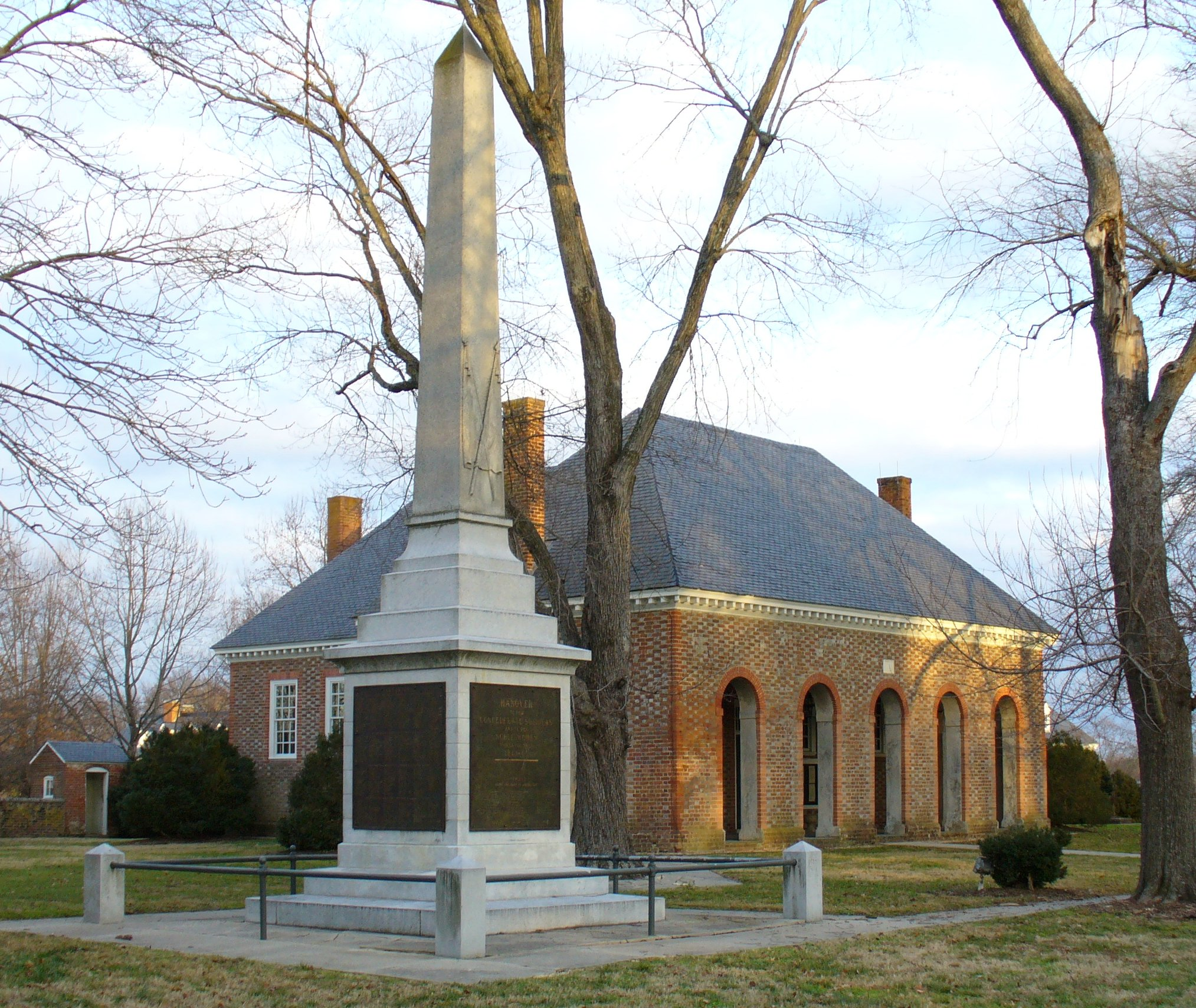
- Historic Hanover County Courthouse and Hanover Civil War Memorial

- Location within Virginia
- Interactive map showing the location of Hanover County Courthouse
- Location: Hanover Court House, Virginia
- Coordinates: 37°45′47″N 77°22′3″W
- Built: 1735
- Architectural style: Georgian
- Part of: Hanover County Courthouse Historic District (ID71000980)
- NRHP reference No.: 69000247
- VLR No.: 042-0016

Significant dates
- Added to NRHP: October 1, 1969
- Designated NHL: November 7, 1973
- Designated CP: September 22, 1971
- Designated VLR: November 5, 1968

Hanover County Courthouse is a historic courthouse located in the community of Hanover Courthouse, the county seat of Hanover County, Virginia. Built about 1735, it is one of the nation's oldest courthouses still in use for that purpose. It is historically notable as the site of the Parson's Cause case, which was argued by Patrick Henry in 1763. It was designated a National Historic Landmark in 1973. A modern courthouse complex stands nearby, which now houses most of the county's judicial functions.

== Description and history ==
The Hanover County Courthouse is located in the center of the small community formally called Hanover Courthouse (but is more colloquially known just as "Hanover"). It is set on a grassy quadrangle on the north side of United States Route 301, with other 18th-century buildings nearby that make up the Hanover County Courthouse Historic District. It is a single-story brick building, with a tall hipped roof with modillioned cornice, and three chimneys. It is laid out in a T shape, with the courtroom in the rear-projecting leg of the T, the judge's quarters on the left side, and a jury room on the right. The front of the building is distinguished by an arcade of rounded arches.

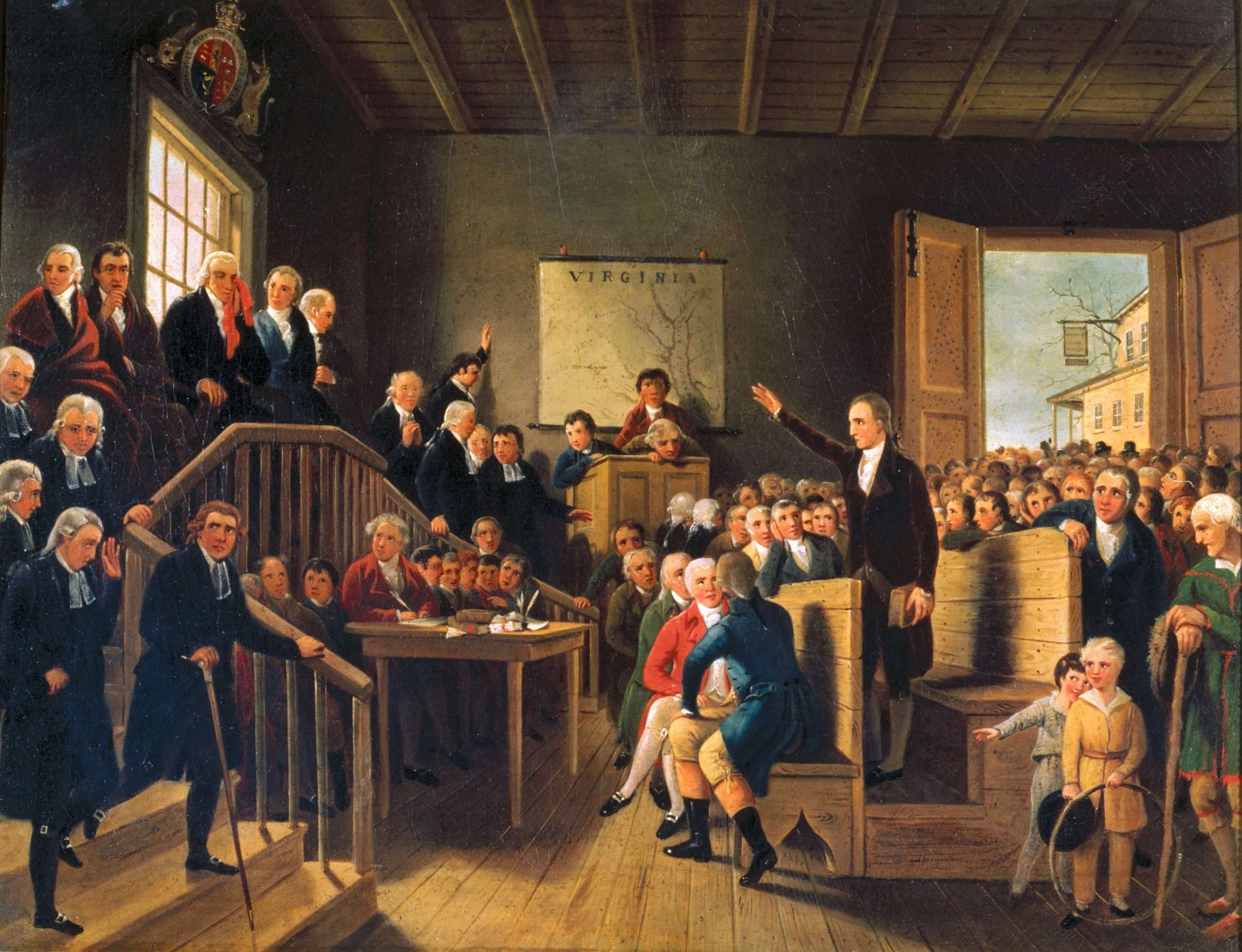
George Cooke's 1834 depiction of Patrick Henry arguing the Parson's Cause case at the Hanover County Courthouse

Hanover County was created in 1720 by the Colony of Virginia. The courthouse was built about 1735, supposedly by William Meriwether, who also built and operated the original Hanover Tavern, just across the main road. Its design was apparently based on the courthouse of King William County to the southeast.

In 1763, Patrick Henry, who lived and practiced law in Hanover County, argued the case of the Parson's Cause, involving King George III's veto of local legislation changing tax rates for the support of local Anglican ministry despite their objections and those of the House of Burgesses. Henry, representing the county, accused the King of tyranny in overturning colonial law without regard to the wishes of his subjects.

A modern government complex with two court buildings opened in 1979 adjacent to the 1735 courthouse. The older building is still actively used for periodic judicial proceedings to alleviate crowded court dockets and also for handling ceremonial events.

== See also ==
- Oldest courthouses in the United States
- List of National Historic Landmarks in Virginia
- National Register of Historic Places listings in Hanover County, Virginia
