= Tuckahoe Apartments =

- U.S. National Register of Historic Places
- Virginia Landmarks Register
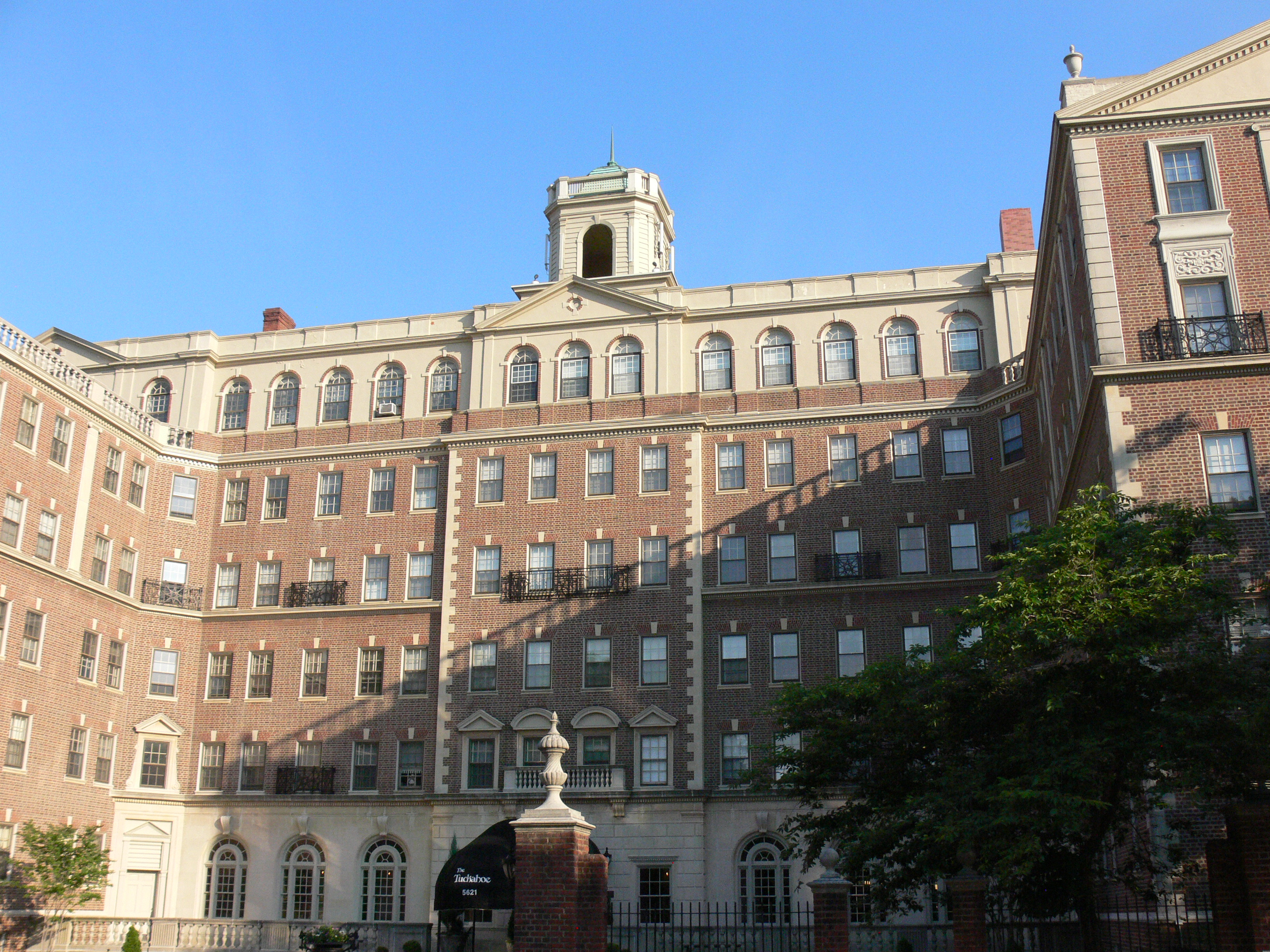
- Tuckahoe Apartments, July 2011

- Location within Virginia Location within the United States
- Location: 5621 Cary Street Rd., Richmond, Virginia
- Coordinates: 37°34′5″N 77°31′26″W
- Area: 1.8 acres (0.73 ha)
- Built: 1928-1929
- Architect: W. Duncan Lee
- Architectural style: Georgian Revival
- NRHP reference No.: 01000065
- VLR No.: 127-5820

Significant dates
- Added to NRHP: February 2, 2001
- Designated VLR: September 13, 2000

Tuckahoe Apartments, also known as The Tuckahoe, is a historic apartment building in Richmond, Virginia. It was designed by W. Duncan Lee and built in 1928–1929. It is a massive, six-story, red brick, Georgian Revival style building. It was built as a luxury "apartment-hotel". The building features original brick-walled entry court, parlors, galleries, solaria, roof terraces, and a domed cupola. The building has 59 apartments.

It was listed on the National Register of Historic Places in 2001.
