= Hanover, Virginia =

- Census-designated place
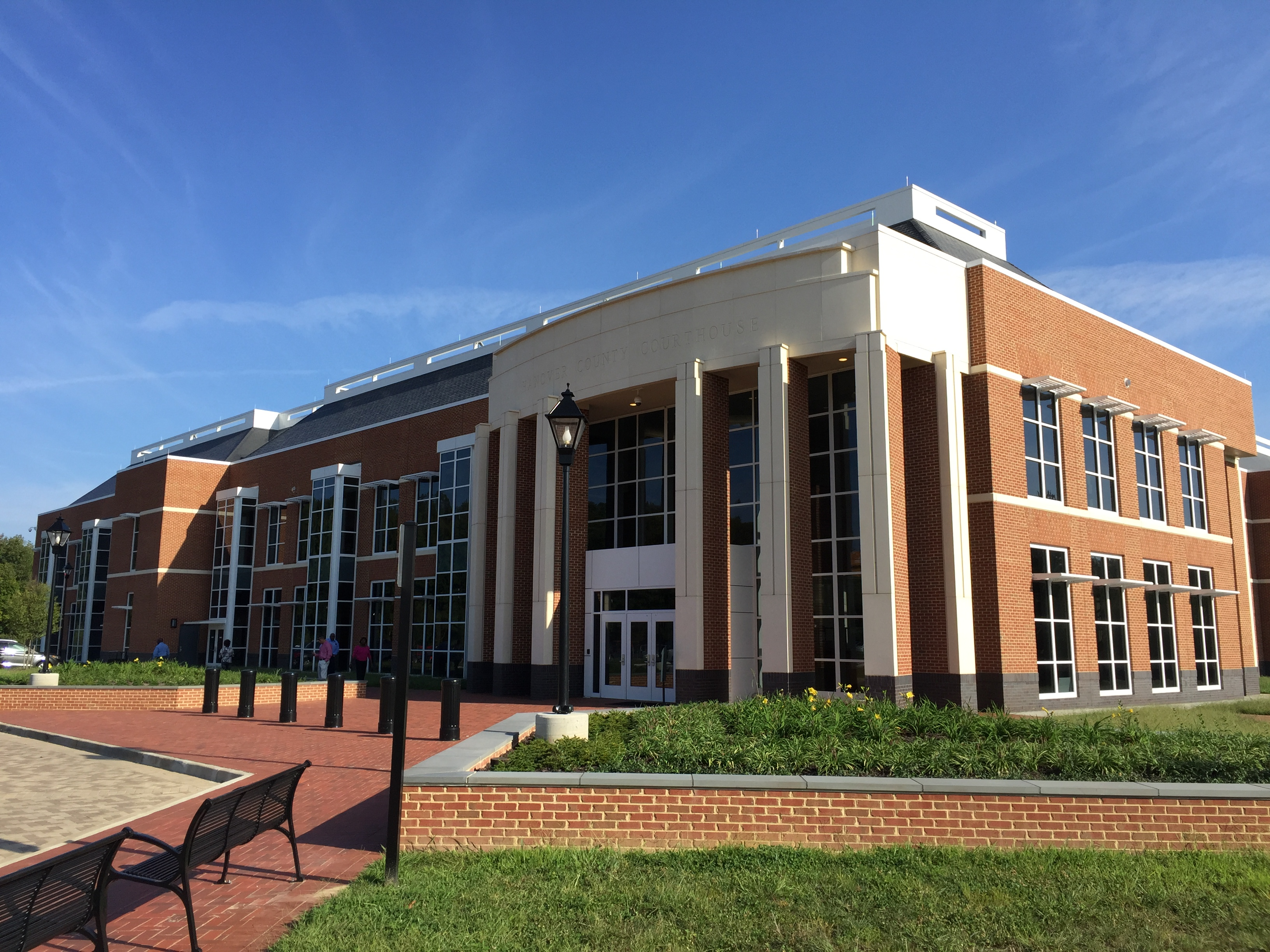
- Hanover County Courthouse

- Location in Hanover County and the state of Virginia
- Coordinates: 37°45′58″N 77°22′12″W
- Country: United States
- State: Virginia
- County: Hanover

Area
  - Total: 1.2 sq mi (3.1 km^{2})
  - Land: 1.2 sq mi (3.1 km^{2})
  - Water: 0 sq mi (0.0 km^{2})
- Elevation: 110 ft (34 m)

Population (2010)
  - Total: 252
  - Density: 212/sq mi (81.9/km^{2})
- Time zone: UTC-5 (Eastern (EST))
  - Summer (DST): UTC-4 (EDT)
- ZIP Code: 23069
- Area code: 804
- FIPS code: 51-35160
- GNIS feature ID: 2629025

Hanover is an unincorporated community and census-designated place (CDP) in Hanover County, Virginia, United States. It is the county seat and is located at the junction of U.S. Route 301 and State Route 54, south of the Pamunkey River. While historically known as Hanover Courthouse, the U.S. Geological Survey, Census Bureau, Postal Service and residents refer to it as "Hanover". The population as of the 2020 census was 52.

== Courthouse ==
Its most notable structure is the Hanover County Courthouse, designated a National Historic Landmark. The attorney Patrick Henry practiced law here and argued the Parson's Cause. It is within the Hanover County Courthouse Historic District, which includes the Hanover Tavern. Rebuilt in 1791 on the site of a Revolutionary-era tavern, the tavern was adapted in 1953 as the Barksdale Theatre, the nation's first dinner theatre. Barksdale was Virginia's first performing arts organization to seat integrated audiences. St. Paul's Episcopal Church was listed on the National Register of Historic Places in 1994.

The Hanover County Courthouse is an operating courthouse. Located along U.S. Route 301, it is across the green from the Hanover Tavern. The courthouse is the third oldest courthouse still in use in the United States. Some local historians cited the courthouse as built in 1735, but the state historical society notes it was built between 1737 and 1742.

== Geography ==
Hanover is located in northeastern Hanover County, south of the Pamunkey River, which forms the border with Caroline County. U.S. Route 301 passes through the center of the CDP, leading south 18 miles (29 km) to the center of Richmond and north 20 miles (32 km) to Bowling Green. Virginia State Route 54 leads west 6 miles (10 km) to Ashland.

According to the U.S. Census Bureau, the Hanover CDP has a total area of 1.2 square miles (3.1 km^{2}), of which 0.7 acres (2,684 m^{2}), or 0.09%, are water. Via the Pamunkey River, the community is part of the York River watershed.

== Demographics ==
Historical population
Census	Pop.	Note	%±
2010	252		—
2020	235		−6.7%
U.S. Decennial Census; 2010 2020

Hanover was first listed as a census designated place in the 2010 U.S. census.

== Notable people ==
- Robert C. Nicholas, US senator
- Patrick Henry, Statesman & founding father
- Henry Clay, American lawyer, statesman, & founding father
