= Hanover County Courthouse Historic District =

Historic district in Virginia, United States

- U.S. National Register of Historic Places
- U.S. Historic district
- Virginia Landmarks Register
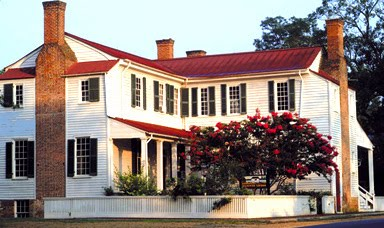
- Hanover Tavern, Hanover County Courthouse Historic District, March 2007

- Location within Virginia Location within the United States
- Location: US 301, Hanover Courthouse, Virginia
- Coordinates: 37°45′43″N 77°22′01″W
- Area: 20 acres (8.1 ha)
- Built: 1735
- NRHP reference No.: 71000980
- VLR No.: 042-0086

Significant dates
- Added to NRHP: September 22, 1971
- Designated VLR: July 6, 1971

Hanover County Courthouse Historic District is a national historic district located at Hanover Courthouse, Hanover County, Virginia, USA. The district includes four contributing buildings in the county seat of Hanover Courthouse. They are the separately listed Hanover County Courthouse (1735), the old jail (1835), the clerk's office (c. 1835), and the Hanover Tavern now known as the Barksdale Theatre.

It was listed on the National Register of Historic Places in 1971.
