= Ashland station (Virginia) =

Ashland, VA
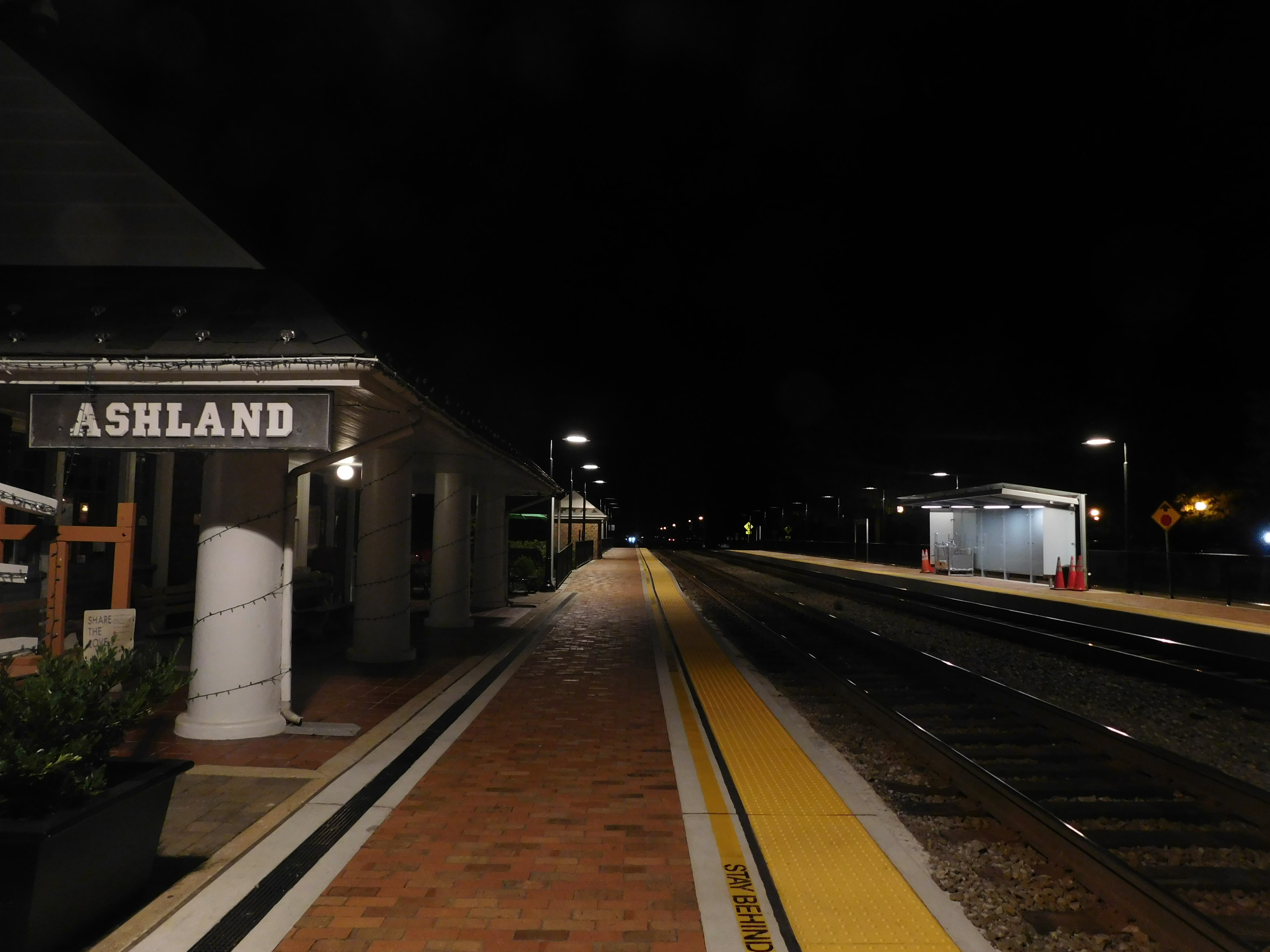
- Ashland station in October 2021 after renovations.

General information
- Location: 112 North Railroad Avenue; Ashland, Virginia; United States
- Coordinates: 37.7596°N 77.4812°W
- Line: CSX RF&P Subdivision
- Platforms: 2 side platforms
- Tracks: 2

Other information
- Station code: Amtrak: ASD

History
- Opened: 1866
- Rebuilt: 1890, 1923, 1985

Passengers
- FY 2025: 42,110 (Amtrak)

Services
Preceding station	Amtrak	Following station
Richmond Staples Mill Road toward Norfolk or Newport News	Northeast Regional	Fredericksburg toward Boston South or Springfield
Auto Train does not stop here
Carolinian does not stop here
Floridian does not stop here
Palmetto does not stop here
Silver Meteor does not stop here
Former services
Preceding station	Richmond, Fredericksburg and Potomac Railroad	Following station
Glen Allen toward Richmond: Broad Street or Main Street	Main Line	Taylorsville toward Washington, D.C.
Location

Ashland is an Amtrak intercity train station in Ashland, Virginia, serving Northeast Regional trains bound for Richmond, Newport News and Norfolk as well as many points north. The station is also designated as Ashland's visitor center. The tracks are lined with a cobblestone median in the center of town, making it a popular train-watching site for railfans.

== History ==
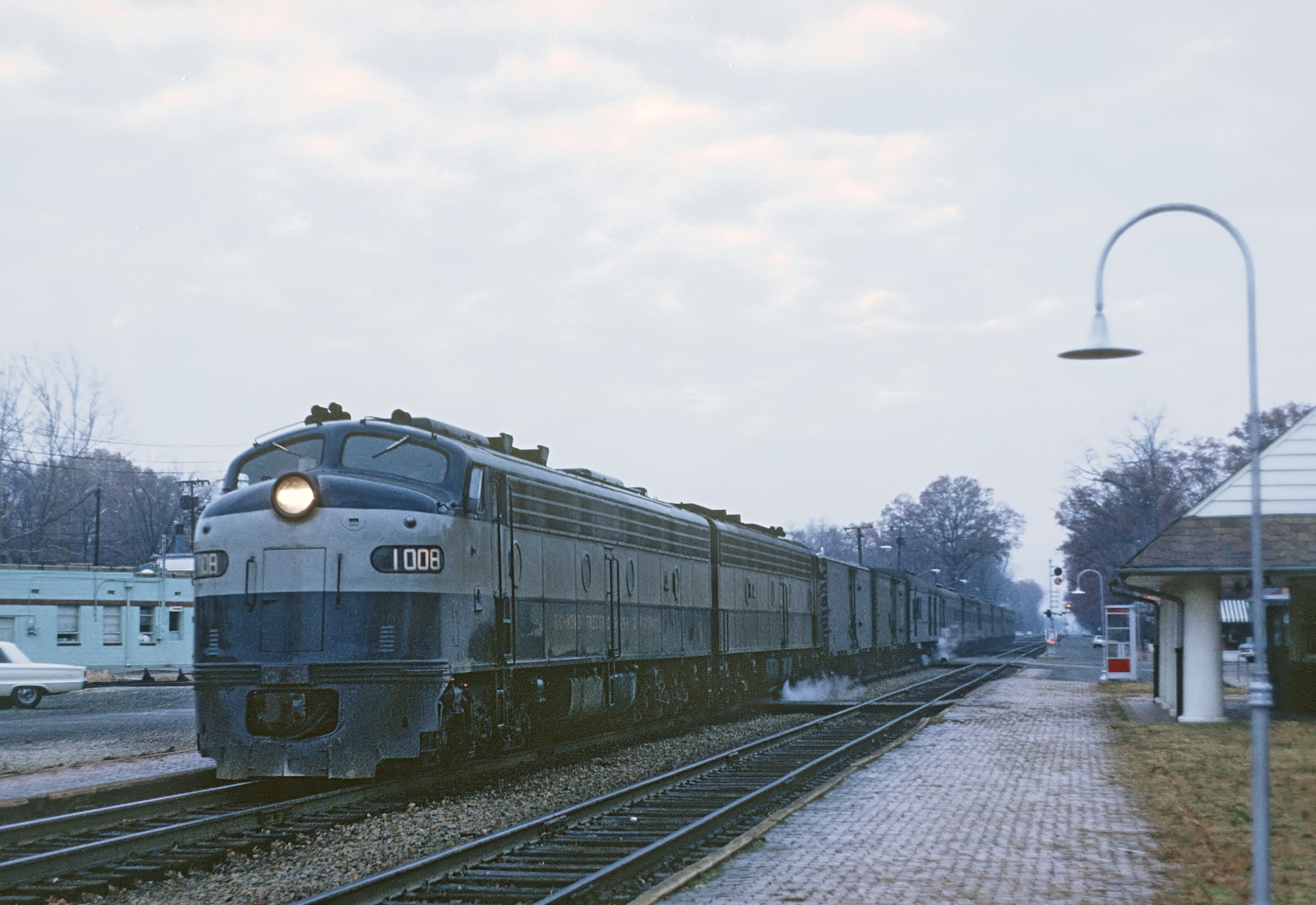
The Silver Comet stopping at Ashland on November 28, 1968

The station was built by the Richmond, Fredericksburg and Potomac Railroad in 1923, replacing a station which was originally built in 1866 and rebuilt in 1890. The station was closed in 1967, but reopened in 1985. It was originally served by the Colonial, and through numerous route changes over the years is now served by Hampton Roads-bound Northeast Regionals.

The Ashland station was racially segregated, like many railroad stations in the Southeastern U.S. built before the 1960s. It had separate waiting rooms for whites and blacks, served by a single ticket booth in the center of the building. The former black waiting room is now a museum filled with various RF&P railroad artifacts, including blueprints, model railroad trains, a bench that was once on display at the Smithsonian Museum, local newspaper and locally related magazine articles.

Construction of new platforms and mobile lifts for accessibility was completed in June 2022.
