= York River =

York River can refer to:

== Canada ==
- York River (Ontario)
- York River (Quebec)

== United States ==
- York River (Maine)
- York River (Virginia)
