= South Anna River =

Coordinates: 37.80347°N 77.40748°W

Physical characteristics
- Length: 102 miles (164 km)

The South Anna River is a principal tributary of the Pamunkey River, about 102 miles (164 km) long, in central Virginia in the United States. Via the Pamunkey and York rivers, it is part of the watershed of the Chesapeake Bay.

According to the Geographic Names Information System, it has also been known as the Anna River.

== Course ==
The South Anna River rises near Gordonsville in southwestern Orange County and flows generally southeastwardly and eastwardly through Louisa and Hanover counties. It joins the North Anna River to form the Pamunkey River about 5 miles (8.0 km) northeast of Ashland.

Near its mouth the river collects the Newfound River.

== River modifications ==
The Ashland Mill Dam in Hanover County was built in 1916.

The Byrd Mill Dam in Louisa County was built in 1745. Only the ruins of its tall foundation and a largely-intact dam remain at the site.

== See also ==
- List of Virginia rivers
