= St. Paul's Episcopal Church (Hanover, Virginia) =

Historic church in Virginia, United States

- U.S. National Register of Historic Places
- Virginia Landmarks Register
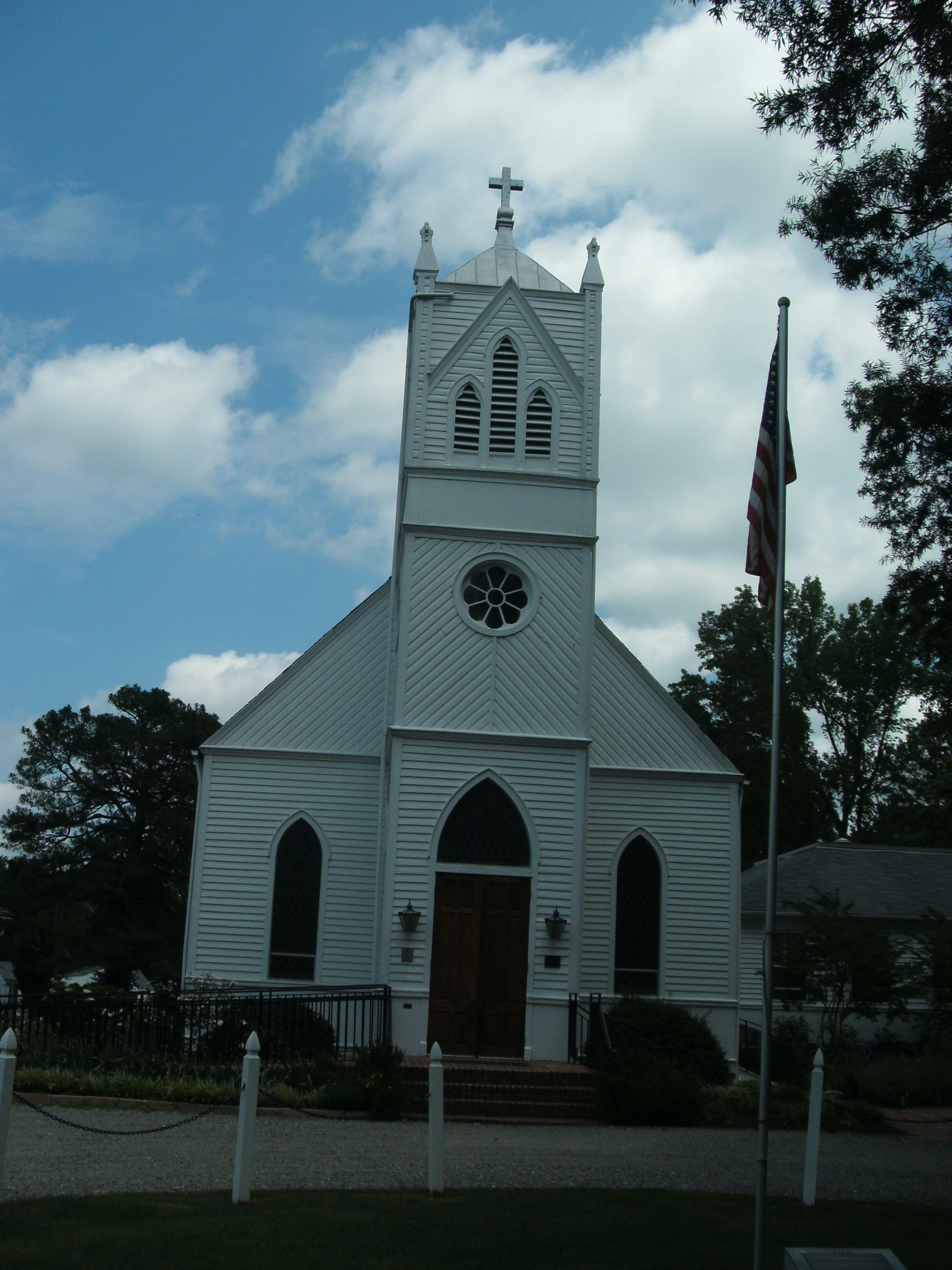

- Location within Virginia Location within the United States
- Location: 8050 Saint Pauls Church Road, Hanover Courthouse, Virginia
- Coordinates: 37°46′04″N 77°22′15″W
- Area: 8.7 acres (3.5 ha)
- Built: 1895
- Architectural style: Late Gothic Revival
- NRHP reference No.: 94000460
- VLR No.: 042-0087

Significant dates
- Added to NRHP: May 19, 1994
- Designated VLR: March 10, 1994

St. Paul's Episcopal Church is a historic Episcopal church in Hanover Courthouse, Virginia, United States. It was built in 1895, and is a one-story, frame building in the Late Gothic Revival style. It has a brick foundation and weatherboard siding with symmetrically placed lancet windows. The front facade features a protruding bell tower in the center with two flanking lancet windows. The church is connected at the northeast corner to an addition used for offices and classrooms, that was built in the 1930s. Another addition was built in the 1960s.

It was listed on the National Register of Historic Places in 1994.
