= Pamunkey River =

Tributary of the York River in Virginia, United States

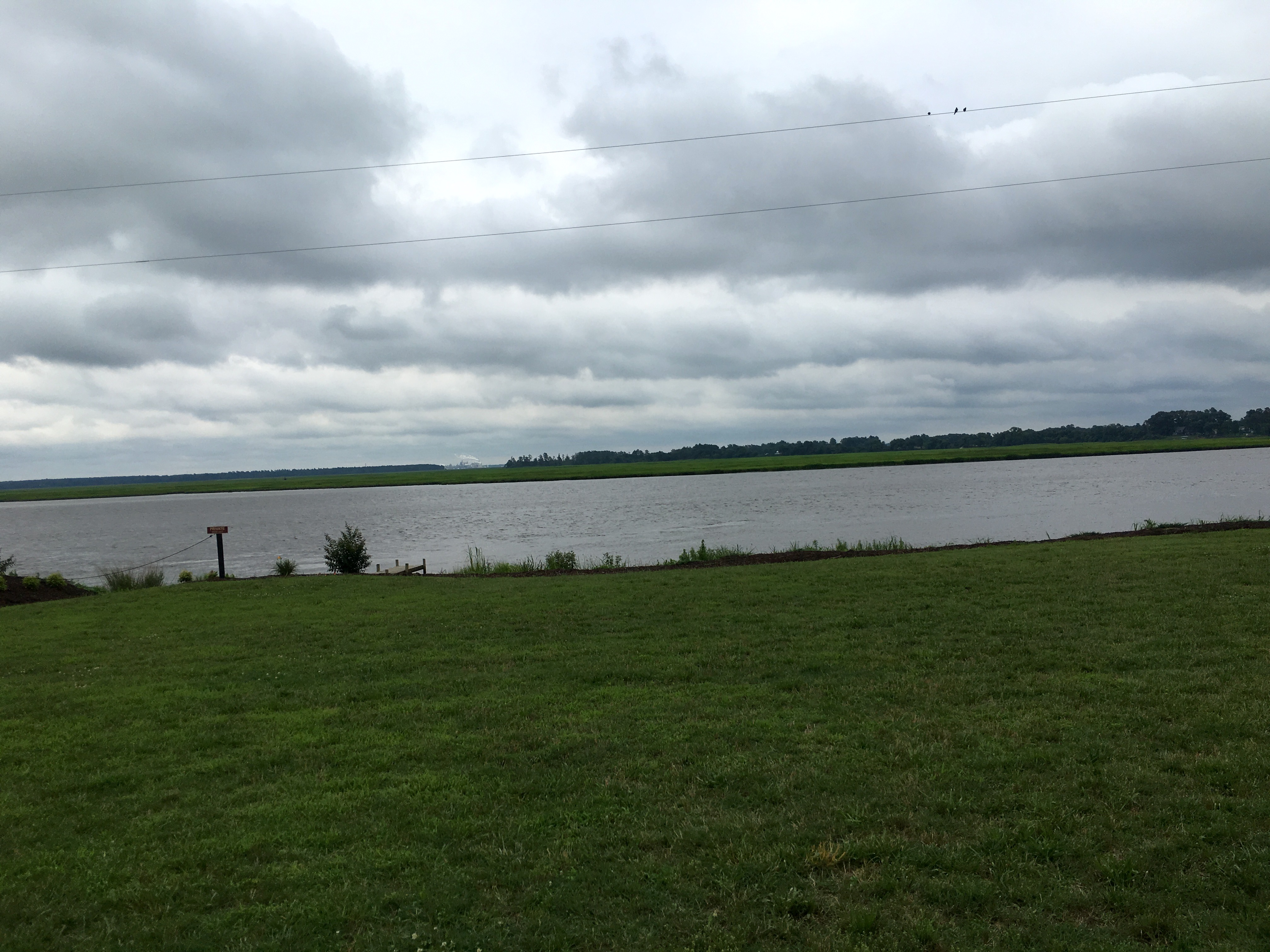
- In Lanexa, Virginia

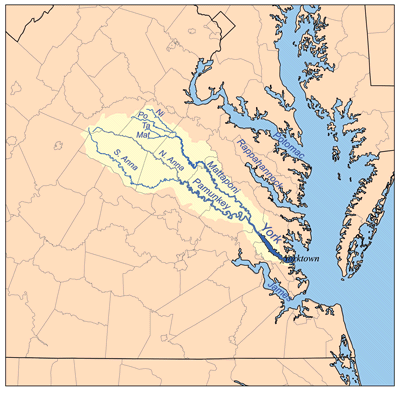
- York River watershed showing the Pamunkey River south of the Mattaponi River

Location
- Country: United States
- State: Virginia
- Counties: New Kent, King William, Caroline, Hanover

Physical characteristics
- Source: Confluence of the North Anna and South Anna rivers
  - location: Near Ashland, forms part of the boundary of Hanover County and Caroline County
  - coordinates: 37°48′13″N 77°24′27″W
- Mouth: York River
  - location: West Point, King William County
  - coordinates: 37°31′3″N 76°47′29″W
- Length: 93 mi (150 km)

Basin features
- Tributaries
  - left: North Anna River
  - right: South Anna River

The Pamunkey River is a tributary of the York River, about 93 mi (150 km) long, in eastern Virginia in the United States. Via the York River it is part of the watershed of the Chesapeake Bay.

== Course ==
The Pamunkey River is formed by the confluence of the North Anna and South Anna rivers on the boundary of Hanover and Caroline counties, about 5 mi (8 km) northeast of the town of Ashland. It flows generally southeastwardly past the Pamunkey Indian Reservation to the town of West Point, where it meets the Mattaponi River to form the York River. The river's course is used to define all or portions of the southern boundaries of Caroline and King William counties and the northern boundaries of Hanover and New Kent counties.

== Variant names ==
The U.S. Board on Geographic Names settled on "Pamunkey River" as the river's official name in 1892. According to the Geographic Names Information System, it has also been known as:

- Pamauncke River
- Pamoeoncock River
- Pamunky River
- Pemaeoncock
- Yough-ta-mund
- Youghtanund

== See also ==
- List of Virginia rivers
