= Ashland, Virginia =

- Town
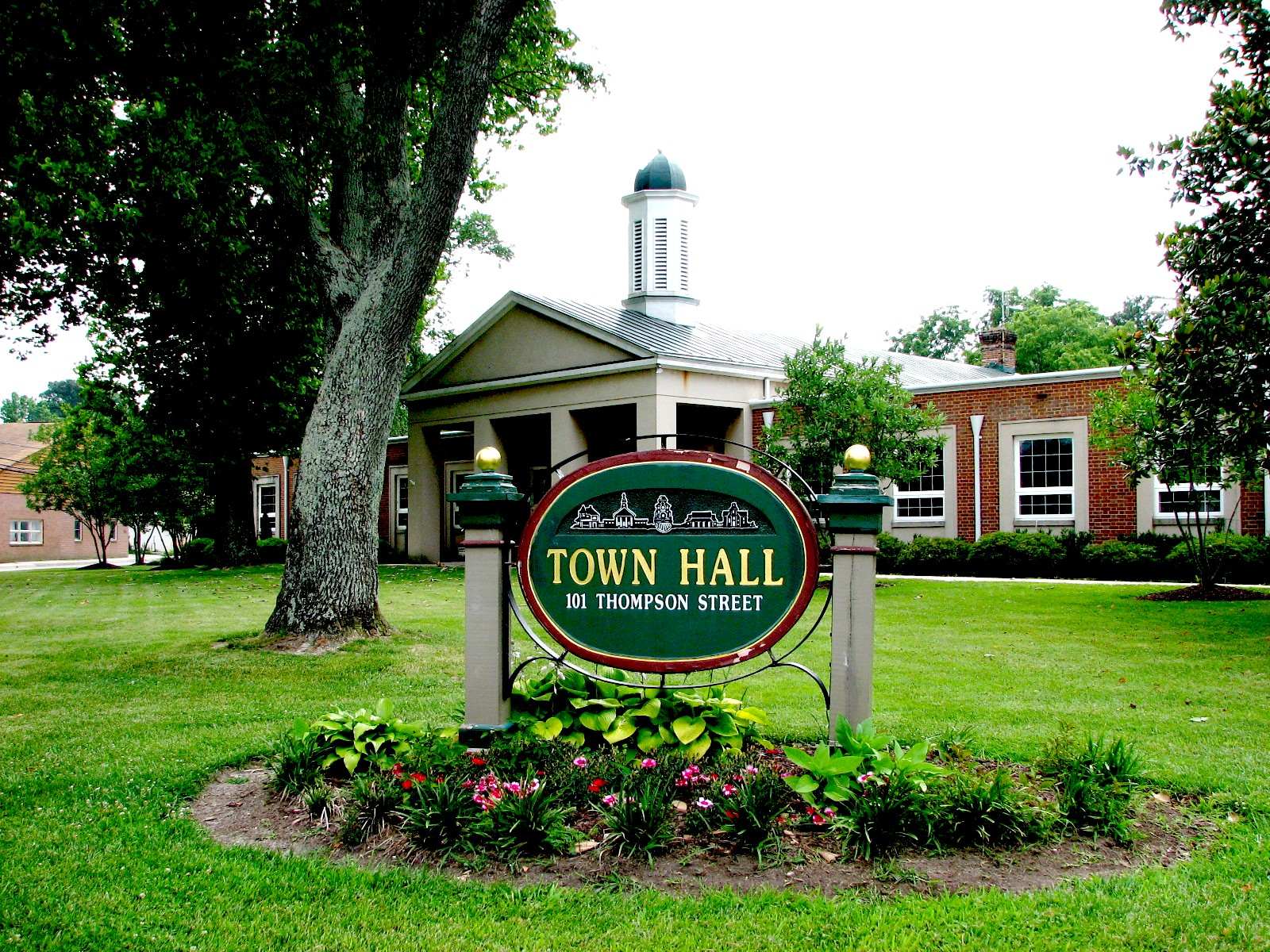
- Ashland Town Hall

- Seal Logo
- Nickname: The Center of the Universe
- Location in Hanover County and the state of Virginia
- Coordinates: 37°45′34″N 77°28′38″W
- Country: United States
- State: Virginia
- County: Hanover
- Founded: 1858

Government
  - Type: Council-Manager
  - Mayor: Steve Trivett
  - Town Manager: Joshua Farrar

Area
  - Total: 7.23 sq mi (18.7 km^{2})
  - Land: 7.20 sq mi (18.6 km^{2})
  - Water: 0.03 sq mi (0.078 km^{2})
- Elevation: 213 ft (65 m)

Population (2020)
  - Total: 7,565
  - Density: 1,000/sq mi (390/km^{2})
- Time zone: UTC−5 (Eastern (EST))
  - Summer (DST): UTC−4 (EDT)
- ZIP code: 23005
- Area code: 804
- FIPS code: 51-03368
- GNIS feature ID: 2390708
- Website: ashlandva.gov

Ashland is a town in Hanover County, Virginia, United States, located 16 miles (26 km) north of Richmond along Interstate 95 and U.S. Route 1. As of the 2020 census it had a population of 7,565, up from 7,225 at the 2010 census.

Ashland is named after the Lexington, Kentucky estate of Hanover County native and statesman Henry Clay. It is the only incorporated town in Hanover County. Although comprising only one square mile when originally incorporated in 1858, today Ashland has grown through several annexations to a size of 7.16 square miles (18.5 km^{2}).

== History ==
The Richmond, Fredericksburg and Potomac Railroad initially developed the town in the 1840s as a mineral springs resort with a racetrack. The town was named "Ashland" after native son Henry Clay's estate in Kentucky and was officially incorporated on February 19, 1858. The area had been known as "The Slashes", sometimes translated as "swamp", but which also reflected the small ravines that formed in the sandy clay soil after hard rains.

In 1861, early in the American Civil War, Ashland hosted Confederate troops at what was called "Camp Ashland" where they trained at an abandoned racetrack. During the war, John Henry Timberlake, a Virginian whose home was at Atlee, Virginia, not far from Ashland, served in Co. G, 4th Virginia Cavalry and rose to the rank of lieutenant. He supplied a map and acted as a guide to Gen. Stonewall Jackson for his trek in June 1862 through Ashland during the war to Cold Harbor. That same month, Gen. Jackson is said to have stayed at the MacMurdo House, 713 South Center Street, right on the tracks of the Richmond, Fredericksburg and Potomac Railroad. The following year, Union skirmishes occurred in the town and the Ashland Baptist Church (still standing today as the Hanover Arts and Activities Center) acted as a hospital for wounded Confederate soldiers.

The war and its aftermath devastated Ashland. However, Randolph–Macon College (founded 1830) moved to Ashland in 1868 and began using buildings of a hotel as well as building additional structures. Their involvement in the town changed the course of Ashland's success.

The college was also a hub for war-related activities after the Civil War. The R-MC students participated in the Student Army Training Corps. during World War I. The town also held events, such as the Liberty Day Parade in 1918, to raise money to buy war bonds to support the war effort. During World War II, J. Enos Ray, mayor of Ashland, became Virginia's first mayor to volunteer to join the United States Army in preparation for war before the 1940 draft was instituted. Randolph-Macon College continued to support the citizens of Ashland, and the United States at large, with its involvement in hosting military training programs. The United States Navy made use of the institution as a preflight training center and a place to train hundreds of soldiers in engineering.

In addition to the college, the railroad and other transportation services were instrumental in helping the town survive. One service was supplied by tycoon Jay Gould when he chartered the Richmond & Chesapeake Bay Railway Co. in 1905 and later established an electrified interurban line between Ashland and Richmond in 1907. However, the line maintained by Richmond & Chesapeake Bay Railway Co. did not survive and was sold at auction to Oliver Jackson Sands Jr. and Jonathan Bryan. They established the Richmond-Ashland Railway Company in 1919 which operated until 1938. A former car barn in Richmond is one of the few remaining vestiges of the line. The short-lived railcar line failed in part due to the growing use of personal vehicles and buses. In fact, in 1928, the Suburban Motor Coach Company was formed by RF&P to provide passenger service via bus between Ashland and Richmond. The county of Hanover and the Town of Ashland has since maintained the trolley line, known as the Ashland Trolley Line Trail, as a walking trail for public use and historic preservation.

As the town grew, the wider national economy grew as well. This growth sparked controversy in 2000 when a proposal to rezone an area east of Ashland to allow Walmart to build and open a store. The details of the controversy were featured in a PBS documentary entitled Store Wars: When Wal-Mart Comes to Town released in 2001. At its opening in 2003, the opposition was so strong, it was reported some demonstrators attempted to prevent shoppers from patronizing the store.

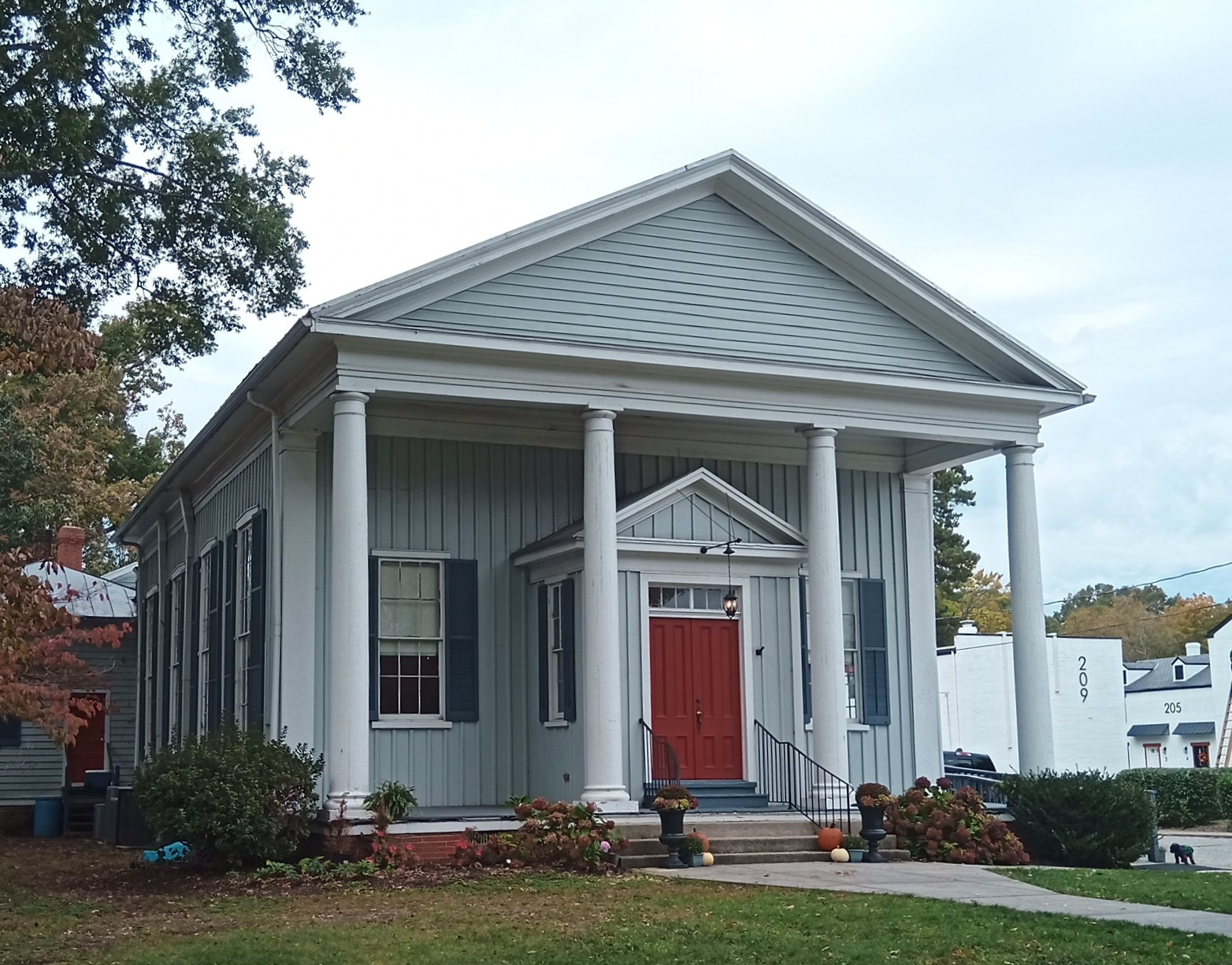
Hanover Arts and Activities Center, formerly Ashland Baptist Church, still stands on 500 South Center St.

Construction of U.S. Route 1 on the former Washington (or Richmond) Road, and later I-95, further shaped the town character and development. However, Ashland has been able to retain its historic features through the work of local and federal programs and initiatives. In the 1980s, Ashland's historic district was recognized by the Virginia Landmarks Register and the National Register of Historic Places for its varied display of building styles for a railroad suburb at the turn of the century. In 2013, Ashland's downtown area was selected as a Virginia Main Street community, a designation that earmarked the town to receive resources to revitalize the area and improve tourism. In addition to the historic homes, many churches are also part of the historical and architectural landscape of the town. One of Virginia's oldest churches is 5 miles (8 km) southeast of Ashland: Slash Church. Built as the Upper Church of St. Paul's Parish in 1729, it remains a house of worship, though now used by the Disciples of Christ. Other historic buildings either used currently or in the past as churches include Hanover Arts and Activities Center (Ashland Baptist Church, built 1860), Shiloh Baptist Church (Freedmens Baptist Church, 1866), Duncan Memorial Chapel (1879, addition in 1955), St. Ann's Performance Art Building (St. Ann's Catholic Church, 1892, Tudor-style remodeling 1925), Ashland Presbyterian Church (1875–1881), Gwathmey Baptist Church (1892). Other notable congregations that have since sold or moved their buildings include St. James the Less Episcopal Church (1880, moved from Center St. to Beverly Rd.) and The Disciples of Christ also had a historic church on Center Street (built 1900) that was replaced in 1985. The rectory of St. James the Less Episcopal Church remains, but in private ownership.

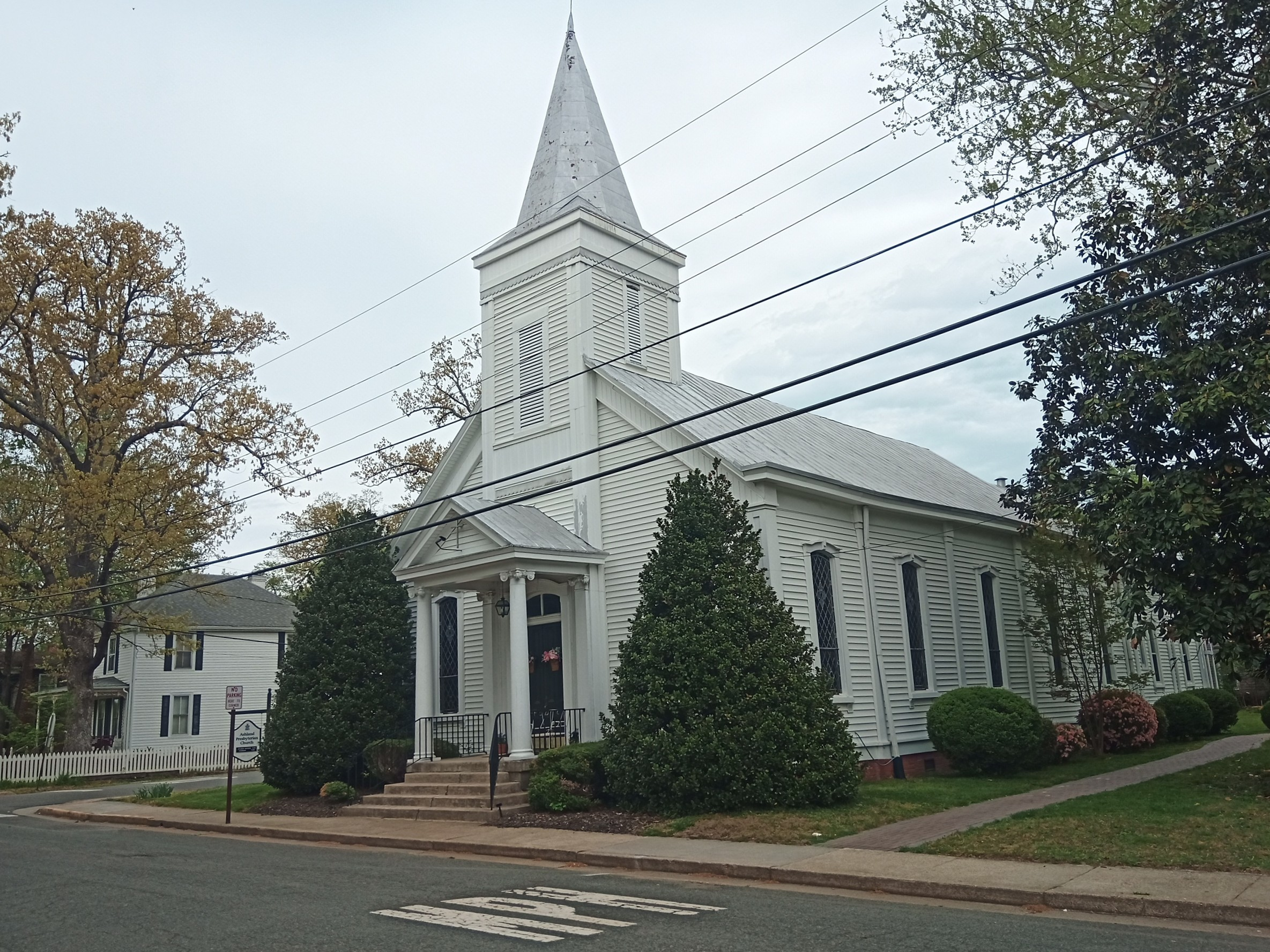
The Ashland Presbyterian Church as it stands on Virginia St. in Ashland, Virginia in 2026.

The town now also has an Eastern Orthodox congregation, St. Andrew's Orthodox Church (2001), and a messianic Jewish congregation, Beth Shalom Ministries (2004).

On October 19, 2002, Ashland made national news as the site of one of the D.C. sniper attacks. Thirty-seven year old Jeffrey Hopper was shot at 8:00 pm in the parking lot of a Ponderosa Steakhouse as he and his wife left the restaurant. A ransom demand note the snipers left nearby was instrumental in identifying them.

The local newspaper, The Herald-Progress, published its final edition on March 29, 2018, after being in operation as The Herald-Progress since 1919.

== Geography ==
Ashland is located near the center of Hanover County at 37°45′34.85″N 77°28′17.61″W (37.7596808, -77.4715595). U.S. Route 1 passes through the east side of the center of town, leading north 8 miles (13 km) to Doswell and south 16 miles (26 km) to Richmond. Interstate 95 passes through the town limits further to the east, with access from Exit 92. I-95 leads north 38 miles (61 km) to Fredericksburg and 90 miles (140 km) to Washington, D.C., while to the south it leads 16 miles to Richmond and 40 miles (64 km) to Petersburg. Virginia State Route 54 goes through the center of Ashland as England Street and Thompson Street, leading east 6 miles (10 km) to U.S. Route 301 at Hanover, the county seat, and northwest 13 miles (21 km) to Montpelier.

According to the United States Census Bureau, Ashland has a total area of 7.2 square miles (18.6 km^{2}), of which 0.03 square miles (0.08 km^{2}), or 0.43%, are water. Ashland is drained to the north by tributaries of the South Anna River, part of the Pamunkey and York River watershed, and to the south by tributaries of the Chickahominy River, part of the James River watershed.

== Climate ==
The climate in this area is humid subtropical (Köppen classification: Cfa) and is characterized by hot, humid summers and generally mild to cold winters. The mean of monthly temperatures ranges from 39.4 °F in January to 80.1 °F in July as of 2024, while the of average annual temperatures range from 47.1 °F to 69.1 °F in Hanover county. The hardiness zone is 7a.

Climate data for Ashland, Virginia (1991–2020 normals, extremes 1893–present, Station ASHLAND, VA US USC00440327)
Month	Jan	Feb	Mar	Apr	May	Jun	Jul	Aug	Sep	Oct	Nov	Dec	Year
Record high °F (°C)	82 (28)	82 (28)	92 (33)	96 (36)	97 (36)	101 (38)	103 (39)	105 (41)	105 (41)	96 (36)	88 (31)	80 (27)	105 (41)
Mean daily maximum °F (°C)	46.8 (8.2)	51.1 (10.6)	59.9 (15.5)	71.1 (21.7)	76.5 (24.7)	82.9 (28.3)	86.7 (30.4)	85.1 (29.5)	79.2 (26.2)	68.9 (20.5)	59.0 (15.0)	49.9 (9.9)	68.1 (20.1)
Daily mean °F (°C)	37.0 (2.8)	40.0 (4.4)	47.8 (8.8)	58.1 (14.5)	65.6 (18.7)	73.1 (22.8)	77.2 (25.1)	75.7 (24.3)	69.3 (20.7)	58.3 (14.6)	48.2 (9.0)	40.1 (4.5)	57.5 (14.2)
Mean daily minimum °F (°C)	27.2 (−2.7)	29.0 (−1.7)	35.7 (2.1)	45.2 (7.3)	54.7 (12.6)	63.2 (17.3)	67.6 (19.8)	66.2 (19.0)	59.5 (15.3)	47.7 (8.7)	37.4 (3.0)	30.2 (−1.0)	47.0 (8.3)
Record low °F (°C)	−18 (−28)	−11 (−24)	4 (−16)	15 (−9)	28 (−2)	37 (3)	43 (6)	41 (5)	33 (1)	19 (−7)	10 (−12)	−4 (−20)	−18 (−28)
Source: National Oceanic & Atmospheric Administration National Environmental Satellite, Data, and Information Service NOAA

== Demographics ==
Historical population
Census	Pop.	Note	%±
1860	148		—
1870	491		231.8%
1880	764		55.6%
1890	948		24.1%
1900	1,147		21.0%
1910	1,324		15.4%
1920	1,290		−2.6%
1930	1,297		0.5%
1940	1,718		32.5%
1950	2,610		51.9%
1960	2,773		6.2%
1970	2,934		5.8%
1980	4,640		58.1%
1990	5,864		26.4%
2000	6,619		12.9%
2010	7,225		9.2%
2020	7,565		4.7%

As of the census of 2020, there were 7,565 people with 2,660 households in the town. The racial makeup of the town was 64.2% White, 21.6% African American, 0.5% Native American, 1.2% Asian, and 4.8% from two or more races. Hispanic or Latino of any race were 13.5% of the population.

The median income for a household in the town was $55,521. The per capita income for the town was $26,227. About 16.9% of the population were below the poverty line.

== Public services ==
Ashland is governed by a five-member town council, and day-to-day activities are run by a town manager, appointed by the town council. The town has a Small Municipal Separate Storm Sewer System (MS4) General Permit. They must follow a MS4 Program Plan which contributes to stormwater system maintenance and management, as well as public participation and education about stormwater and how it affects the region. The town's library is part of the multi-county Pamunkey Regional Library System, although additional libraries are at the courthouse and Randolph-Macon College.

The Ashland Volunteer Fire Company, formed in the 1890s after a devastating fire in 1893, and one of the oldest in the county, is still located on 501 Archie Canon Drive. It remained a volunteer-led company until 2016 when Hanover County Fire-EMS began providing additional service. Public safety efforts are also supported by The Ashland Volunteer Rescue Squad. Founded in 1950, they have been supporting the community from their station on 203 Duncan Street until an ambulance engine caught fire in 2025. Despite the damage to the building, they continue to support Ashland and the surrounding area until repairs are complete. The Ashland Police Department has 30 sworn full-time officers and is Law Enforcement Accredited by the Commission on Accreditation for Law Enforcement Agencies, Inc. (CALEA).

== Education ==
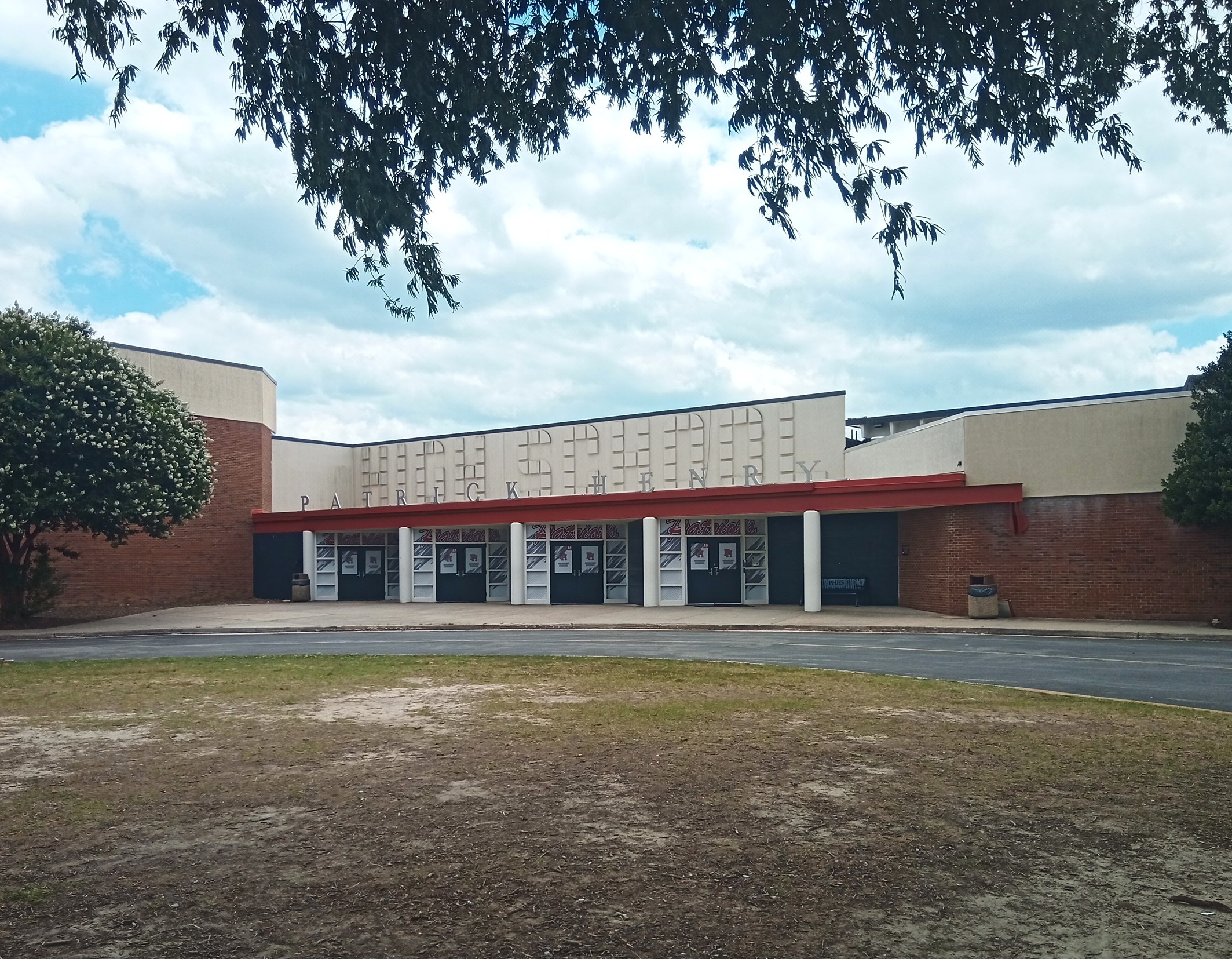
Patrick Henry High School in Ashland, Virginia.

Hanover County Public Schools oversees the primary and secondary education institutions in and around Ashland. Schools in Ashland under their operation include Ashland Elementary School (in operation since 2024 after the consolidation of Henry Clay Elementary and John M. Gandy Elementary Schools), Elmont Elementary School, Liberty Middle School, and Patrick Henry High School. The sole high school had an enrollment of 1,294 students during the 2024-2025 academic year. Post-secondary education is offered by Randolph-Macon College which is still situated near the center of the town.

== Transportation ==
Ashland's major highway connection is to I-95 at exit 92, via Virginia State Route 54. Commercial airline service is provided at Richmond International Airport, 26 miles (42 km) distant, and general aviation is served by Hanover County Municipal Airport, 5 miles (8 km) south of downtown.

Ashland's railroad station is served by Amtrak Northeast Regional trains bound for Richmond, Newport News and Norfolk, as well as points north such as Washington, D.C., and beyond on the Northeast Corridor to Baltimore, Philadelphia, New York City, and Boston. Other Amtrak long-distance trains, including the Auto Train, Carolinian, Floridian, Palmetto and Silver Meteor, pass through Ashland without stopping on CSX's RF&P Subdivision, which bisects the downtown business district.

Proposals in the 2016 Washington, D.C. to Richmond Southeast High-Speed Rail (DC2RVA) study to improve rail service between Washington, D.C., and Richmond by expanding the existing double-track railroad to triple-track have prompted concerns about its impact on the prized ambiance of downtown Ashland. The Main Street merchants' association said at a hearing that the additional track would result in "incalculable” loss to the city's "charm, the quaintness, and the aesthetic values". By 2017, it was resolved by the Commonwealth Transportation Board that the Federal Railroad Administration follow the recommendations regarding the areas of the DC2RVA study. The resolution also directed the Virginia Department of Rail and Public Transportation to avoid acquiring property, or keep it to a minimum when possible. Additionally, the department was directed to avoid interfering with the operations of Randolph-Macon College and explore any improvements which would contribute to the safety of citizens. In 2019, the DC2RVA study was completed and documented a preliminary rail design, environmental impact, and fulfilled requirements of the National Environment Policy Act.

== Local attractions and events ==
Ashland's tourist information center is located at the Ashland railroad station. Bloomberg Business in 2009 named Ashland "Best Place to Raise your Kids" in Virginia. In 2014, Movoto.com named Ashland one of America's 10 best small towns.

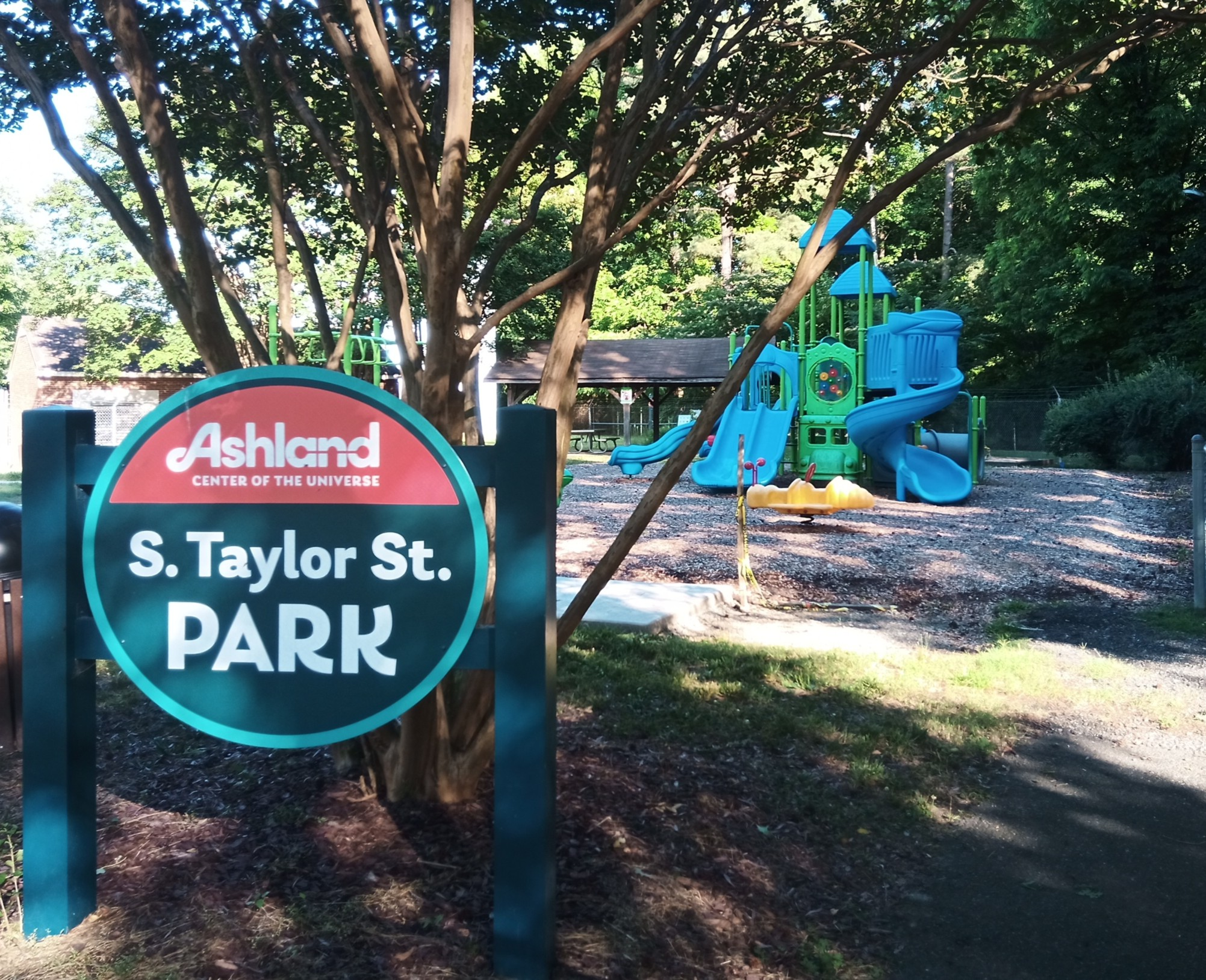
The entrance to South Taylor Street Park.

Ashland features several parks and walking trails for public use. These are managed by Hanover Parks and Recreation and the Town of Ashland's Parks and Recreation Department. The five parks within Ashland maintained by the town include Berkleytown Heritage Park, Kiwanis Pufferbelly Park, DeJarnette Park, Carter Park Pool, and South Taylor Street Park. Though several of the parks include trails, designated trails include Ashland Trolley Line Trail (0.85 miles), Fall Line Trail (5 miles, still under construction), Railside Park and Trail (0.33 miles), and Stony Run Trail (unspecified). Poor Farm Park, though having an Ashland address, is maintained by Hanover Parks and Recreation.

The "Ashland Olde Time Holiday Parade" is an event organized by the Kiwanis Club of Ashland that takes place on the Sunday before Thanksgiving every year since the late 1960s. The Kiwanis Club of Ashland has organized it since the late 1990s.

Beginning in 1982, Ashland's main festival has been the "Strawberry Faire" in June, at which vendors from around the state sell a variety of different items (with a strawberry theme). Festivities include a Strawberry Faire Pageant for Little Miss and Mister Strawberry, as well as live performances by local artists. Ten Hanover County Public Schools students each year receive Strawberry Faire scholarships.

The "Ashland Musical Variety Show" is a biennial talent show held in odd years started in the early 1980s. It features songs and skits performed by area residents and raises funds for the Hanover Arts & Activities Center in Ashland.

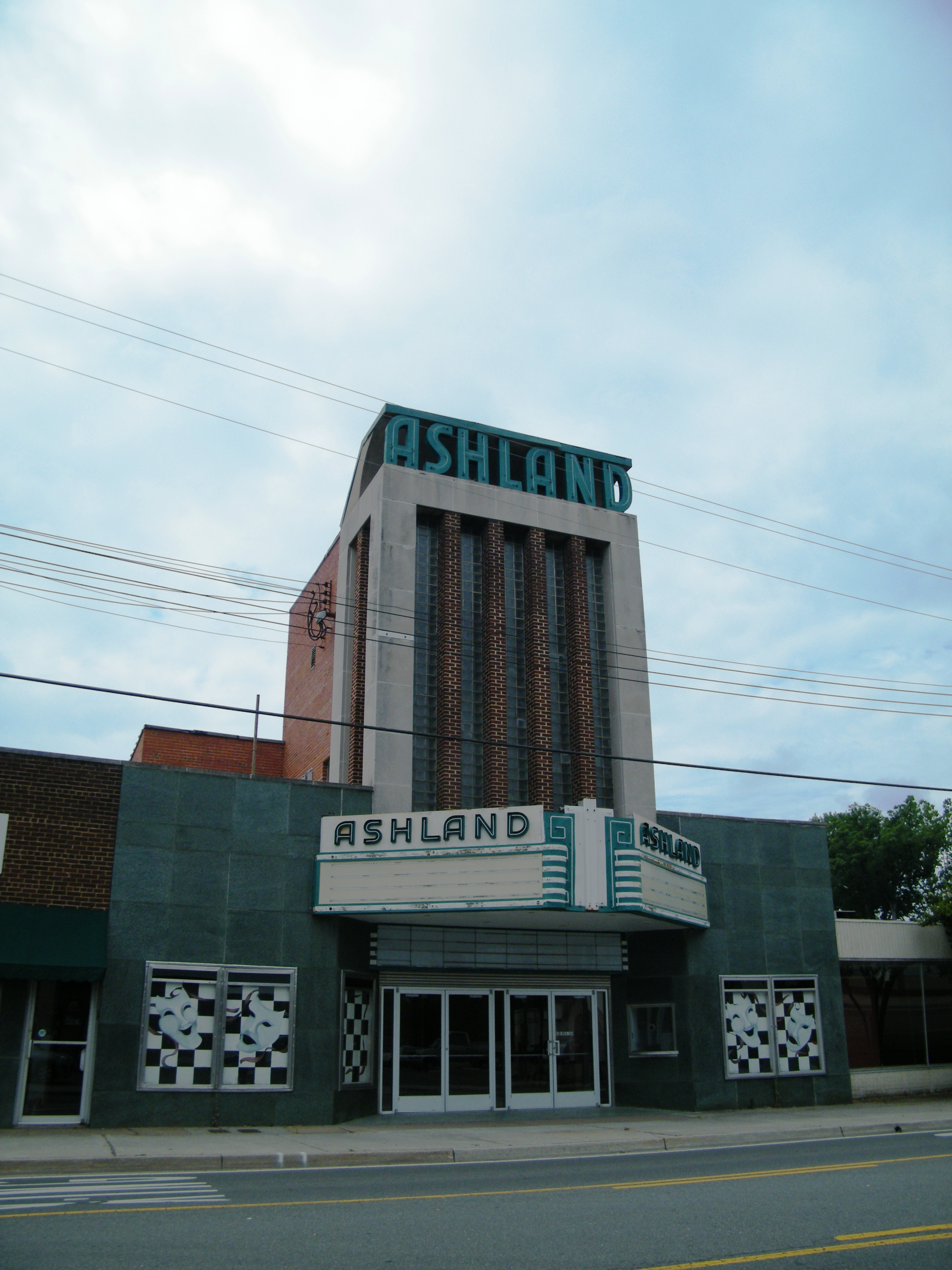
The Ashland Theatre in Ashland, Virginia circa 2011.

Another festival is the family-friendly annual "Ashland Train Day," usually held on the last Saturday in April. Vendors can be found from around the country up and down Railroad Avenue. With the Quiet Zone rules in suspension, visitors are treated to frequent CSX freight trains and Amtrak passenger trains sounding off. During the event, Railroad Ave. and England St. are blocked off from vehicle traffic.

The Ashland Theatre sits on England Street and first opened in 1948 until its closure in the 1990s. The Ashland Theatre reopened its doors in 2018 after being completely renovated. It is run by the Ashland Theatre Foundation, a non-profit organization. The building is distinguished by its vintage appearance and neon lights. It offers an array of activities such as movies, concerts, book signings, and more.

== In popular culture ==
Sarah Elmira Royster Shelton lived in Ashland on S. Center Street in 1870. She claimed to be the "lost Lenore" of Edgar Allen Poe's works. The house still stands on Center St. in private ownership.

In the 1930s, Christopher Chenery founded Meadow Stable right outside of Ashland in Caroline County, Virginia. It was here Secretariat, a Triple Crown-winning racehorse, got his start with Chenery as his trainer. The memory of the thoroughbred and his jockey, Ron Turcotte, have been immortalized in a bronze statue by sculptor Jocelyn Russell. Installed in 2024, the statue stands in downtown Ashland at the corner of England St. and Railroad Ave.

Scenes from the 1995 film Major Payne were shot at Ashland's railroad station.

In November 2025, a raccoon broke into the Ashland ABC liquor store and passed out drunk after consuming alcohol. The story made international news.

== See also ==
- Ashland Skate Park
