= National Register of Historic Places listings in Hanover County, Virginia =

Location of Hanover County in Virginia

This is a list of the National Register of Historic Places listings in Hanover County, Virginia.

This is intended to be a complete list of the properties and districts on the National Register of Historic Places in Hanover County, Virginia, United States. The locations of National Register properties and districts for which the latitude and longitude coordinates are included below, may be seen in an online map.

There are 47 properties and districts listed on the National Register in the county, including 3 National Historic Landmarks.

This National Park Service list is complete through NPS recent listings posted July 10, 2026.

== Current listings ==
	Name on the Register	Image	Date listed	Location	City or town	Description
1	Ashland Historic District	Ashland Historic District	February 11, 1983 (#83003284)	Center, Racecourse, James, Howard, and Clay Sts., and Hanover and Railroad Aves. 37°45′30″N 77°28′50″W	Ashland	
2	Ashland UDC Jefferson Davis Highway Marker	Ashland UDC Jefferson Davis Highway Marker	August 27, 2013 (#13000642)	Junction of U.S. Route 1 and Cedar Lane; 37°41′22″N 77°27′46″W	Glen Allen	
3	Beaverdam Depot	Beaverdam Depot	November 8, 1988 (#88002060)	On the CSX railroad tracks at the junction of Beaver Dam and Beaverdam School Rds. 37°56′28″N 77°39′12″W	Beaverdam	
4	Berkleytown Historic District		September 20, 2022 (#100008210)	Bounded by the CSX Railroad, Archie Cannon Dr., US 1/North Washington Hwy., and Smith St. 37°46′05″N 77°28′29″W	Ashland	
5	Brown Grove Rural Historic District		April 27, 2023 (#100008295)	Ashcake, Carters Heights, Egypt, Johnson-Town, Sliding Hill, Lewistown, Brook Springs, and Mount Hermon Rds. 37°42′57″N 77°25′22″W	Ashland vicinity	
6	Church Quarter	Church Quarter	November 22, 2000 (#00001436)	12432 Old Ridge Rd. 37°50′54″N 77°31′31″W	Doswell	
7	Henry Clay Elementary School		July 16, 2026 (#100013217)	310 South James Street; 37°45′21″N 77°29′11″W	Ashland	
8	Clover Lea	Clover Lea	February 28, 1979 (#79003045)	East of Mechanicsville off Piping Tree Rd. 37°38′36″N 77°11′05″W	Mechanicsville	
9	Cold Harbor National Cemetery	Cold Harbor National Cemetery	August 10, 1995 (#95000922)	0.5 miles (0.80 km) east of the junction of State Route 156 and Cold Harbor Rd. 37°35′22″N 77°16′48″W	Mechanicsville	
10	Cool Well	Cool Well	September 6, 2007 (#07000931)	8198 Shady Grove Rd. 37°37′35″N 77°22′32″W	Mechanicsville	
11	Dewberry	Dewberry	May 23, 1996 (#96000576)	Approximately 1 mile (1.6 km) northeast of the junction of Hewlett and Old Ridge Rds. 37°53′41″N 77°35′22″W	Beaverdam	
12	Ellington	Ellington	November 18, 2019 (#100004650)	17335 U.S. Route 1; 37°53′00″N 77°27′58″W	Doswell	
13	Fork Church	Fork Church	February 26, 1970 (#70000801)	At the junction of Old Ridge and Rocketts Mill Rds. 37°51′13″N 77°31′52″W	Ashland	
14	Hanover County Courthouse	Hanover County Courthouse	October 1, 1969 (#69000247)	Junction of U.S. Route 301 and Library Dr. 37°45′47″N 77°22′01″W	Hanover Court House	
15	Hanover County Courthouse Historic District	Hanover County Courthouse Historic District	September 22, 1971 (#71000980)	U.S. Route 301; 37°45′46″N 77°22′00″W	Hanover	
16	Hanover Meeting House	Hanover Meeting House	September 4, 1991 (#91001089)	6411 Heatherwood Dr. 37°38′42″N 77°19′50″W	Mechanicsville	Site of the first non-Anglican church in Virginia
17	Hanover Town	Hanover Town	September 17, 1974 (#74002122)	River Rd. on the western side of the Pamunkey River; 37°41′52″N 77°14′46″W	Mechanicsville	
18	Hanover Wayside	Hanover Wayside	November 22, 2002 (#02001365)	8225 Hanover Wayside Rd. 37°42′08″N 77°22′56″W	Hanover	
19	Hickory Hill	Hickory Hill	November 21, 1974 (#74002121)	East of Ashland off Hickory Hill Rd. 37°46′27″N 77°24′50″W	Ashland	
20	Hickory Hill Slave and African American Cemetery		August 12, 2020 (#100005427)	Providence Church Rd. 37°46′40″N 77°25′06″W	Ashland	
21	Immanuel Episcopal Church	Immanuel Episcopal Church	May 23, 1996 (#96000577)	Old Church Rd., 1.7 miles (2.7 km) east of its junction with U.S. Route 360; 37°38′35″N 77°12′59″W	Mechanicsville	
22	Laurel Meadow	Laurel Meadow	July 7, 1995 (#95000827)	Eastern side of Lee Davis Rd., 0.2 miles (0.32 km) south of its junction with Pole Green Rd. 37°38′00″N 77°20′12″W	Mechanicsville	
23	Little River UDC Jefferson Davis Highway Marker	Little River UDC Jefferson Davis Highway Marker	April 17, 2018 (#100002355)	15400 Washington Highway; 37°49′50″N 77°28′12″W	Doswell	
24	Macmurdo House		February 19, 2021 (#100006158)	713 South Center St. 37°45′13″N 77°28′58″W	Ashland	
25	Montpelier Historic District	Montpelier Historic District	May 16, 2002 (#02000517)	Roughly along Mountain Rd. 37°49′08″N 77°40′59″W	Montpelier	
26	Oak Forest	Oak Forest	August 23, 1999 (#99000964)	7400 Rural Point Rd. 37°40′35″N 77°21′07″W	Mechanicsville	
27	Oakland	Oakland	July 30, 1974 (#74002123)	North of Montpelier; 37°52′20″N 77°39′42″W	Montpelier	
28	Oakley Hill	Oakley Hill	May 19, 1994 (#94000459)	Southern side of State Route 156, 2,500 feet (760 m) west of its junction with Lee Davis Rd. 37°35′45″N 77°20′23″W	Mechanicsville	
29	Patrick Henry's Birthplace Archeological Site	Patrick Henry's Birthplace Archeological Site	August 2, 1982 (#82001819)	9620 Studley Farm Dr. 37°40′09″N 77°17′27″W	Studley	
30	Pine Slash	Pine Slash	November 19, 1987 (#87001946)	Rural Point Rd. 37°39′21″N 77°19′31″W	Studley	
31	Randolph-Macon College Buildings	Randolph-Macon College Buildings	June 19, 1979 (#79003044)	Randolph-Macon College campus 37°45′38″N 77°28′47″W	Ashland	
32	Richmond National Battlefield Park	Richmond National Battlefield Park	October 15, 1966 (#66000836)	East of Richmond; 37°35′24″N 77°17′06″W	Richmond	
33	Edmund Ruffin Plantation	Edmund Ruffin Plantation	October 15, 1966 (#66000837)	11 miles (18 km) northeast of Richmond on U.S. Route 360; 37°39′15″N 77°13′21″W	Richmond	Also known as Marlbourne
34	Rural Plains	Rural Plains	June 5, 1975 (#75002021)	6 miles (9.7 km) north of Mechanicsville off Studley Rd. 37°39′39″N 77°20′49″W	Mechanicsville	
35	St. Paul's Episcopal Church	St. Paul's Episcopal Church	May 19, 1994 (#94000460)	Southwestern corner of the junction of U.S. Route 301 and State Route 54; 37°45′56″N 77°22′15″W	Hanover	
36	Scotchtown	Scotchtown	October 15, 1966 (#66000835)	10 miles (16 km) northwest of Ashland on Scotchtown Rd. 37°50′40″N 77°35′10″W	Ashland	Also known as the Patrick Henry House
37	Selwyn	Selwyn	May 22, 2003 (#03000445)	6279 Powhite Farm Dr. 37°34′57″N 77°19′12″W	Mechanicsville	
38	Sharp's Oakland	Sharp's Oakland	January 24, 2002 (#01001514)	12308 Verdon Rd. 37°53′57″N 77°30′47″W	Doswell	
39	Slash Church	Slash Church	September 22, 1972 (#72001399)	Mt. Hermon Rd., north of its junction with Peaks Rd. 37°43′10″N 77°24′52″W	Ashland	
40	Spring Green	Spring Green	December 31, 2002 (#02000316)	2160 Old Church Rd. 37°37′50″N 77°10′21″W	Mechanicsville	
41	Springfield	Springfield	August 16, 1994 (#94000990)	Southern side of Old Ridge Rd., 0.4 miles (0.64 km) southwest of its junction with Coatesville Rd. 37°51′57″N 77°36′47″W	Coatesville	
42	Sycamore Tavern	Sycamore Tavern	July 24, 1974 (#74002124)	West of U.S. Route 33; 37°49′23″N 77°41′14″W	Montpelier	
43	The Tavern at Old Church	The Tavern at Old Church	May 16, 2016 (#16000260)	3350-3360 Old Church Rd. 37°38′41″N 77°13′17″W	Mechanicsville	
44	Totomoi	Totomoi	December 12, 1976 (#76002108)	West of Studley on Rural Point Rd. 37°40′08″N 77°22′19″W	Studley	
45	Trinity Church	Trinity Church	December 27, 1990 (#90001923)	Junction of Teman and Goshen Rds. 37°54′04″N 77°37′56″W	Beaverdam	
46	Virginia Industrial Home School for Colored Girls	Virginia Industrial Home School for Colored Girls	October 7, 2016 (#15000926)	11391 Barrett Center Rd. 37°42′39″N 77°21′42″W	Mechanicsville	
47	Williamsville	Williamsville	November 18, 1985 (#85002915)	Off Williamsville Rd. 37°41′50″N 77°18′23″W	Studley	

== See also ==
- List of National Historic Landmarks in Virginia
- National Register of Historic Places listings in Virginia
- National Register of Historic Places listings in Richmond, Virginia
