= Laurel Meadow =

Laurel Meadow may refer to:

- Laurel Meadow (Mechanicsville, Virginia), a historic home near Mechanicsville, Hanover County, Virginia
- Laurel Meadow (Richmond, Virginia), a historic house in Richmond, Virginia
