= Immanuel Episcopal Church =

Immanuel Episcopal Church may refer to:

in the United States;

(by state)

- Immanuel Episcopal Church on the Green, 1703 church in New Castle, Delaware
- Immanuel Episcopal Church (Winona, Mississippi), listed on the NRHP in Mississippi
- Immanuel Episcopal Church (Bellows Falls, Vermont), where Carlton Chase was rector
- Immanuel Episcopal Church (Mechanicsville, Virginia), NRHP-listed
