= Augustus Barry =

American civil war soldier

- Born: c. 1840; Ireland
- Died: August 3, 1871 (aged 30–31)
- Burial place: Cold Harbor National Cemetery, Mechanicsville, Hanover County, Virginia
- Military career
- Allegiance: United States of America
- Branch: United States Army; Union Army
- Rank: Sergeant Major
- Unit: 16th Regiment, U.S. Infantry
- Conflicts: American Civil War
- Awards: Medal of Honor

Augustus Barry (c. 1840 – August 3, 1871) was an American soldier who received the Medal of Honor for valor during the American Civil War.

== Biography ==
Barry served in the American Civil War in the 16th U.S. Infantry for the Union Army. He received the Medal of Honor on February 28, 1870, for his actions in Tennessee and Georgia during the war.

== Medal of Honor citation ==
Citation:

Gallantry in various actions during the rebellion.

== See also ==
- List of American Civil War Medal of Honor recipients: A–F
