= Spring Green =

Spring Green or spring green may refer to:

== Colors ==
- Spring green
  - Spring bud, formerly known as spring green

== Plants ==
- Spring greens (broad term), edible young leaves of certain plants
- Spring greens (British vegetable), a cultivated form of Brassica oleracea

== Places in the United States ==
- Spring Green Primitive Baptist Church, Hamilton, Martin County, North Carolina
- Spring Green (Mechanicsville, Virginia), an NRHP-listed home
- Spring Green (town), Wisconsin
  - Spring Green, Wisconsin, a village located in the town

== See also ==
- Green Spring (disambiguation)
