= Green Spring =

Green Spring or Green Springs may refer to:

== United States ==
=== Places ===
- Green Springs Park, park and spring in Enterprise, Florida
- Green Spring, Kentucky, a home rule-class city
- Green Springs, Ohio, a village in Sandusky County and Seneca County
- Green Spring, a plantation house in Green Spring Gardens Park, Fairfax County, Virginia
- Green Spring Plantation, James City County, Virginia
- Green Springs National Historic Landmark District, in Louisa County, Virginia
- Green Springs (Trevilians, Virginia), a house within Green Springs National Historic Landmark District
- Green Spring, West Virginia, a town

=== Roads ===
- Alabama State Route 149 partly follows Green Springs Highway, an interstate highway located in Jefferson County, Alabama
- Green Springs Highway, Oregon Route 66, between Ashland and Klamath Falls

== See also ==
- Greene Springs, Missouri, a ghost town in the US
- Spring Green (disambiguation)
- Spring (disambiguation)
- Green (disambiguation)
