= The Tavern at Old Church =

- U.S. National Register of Historic Places
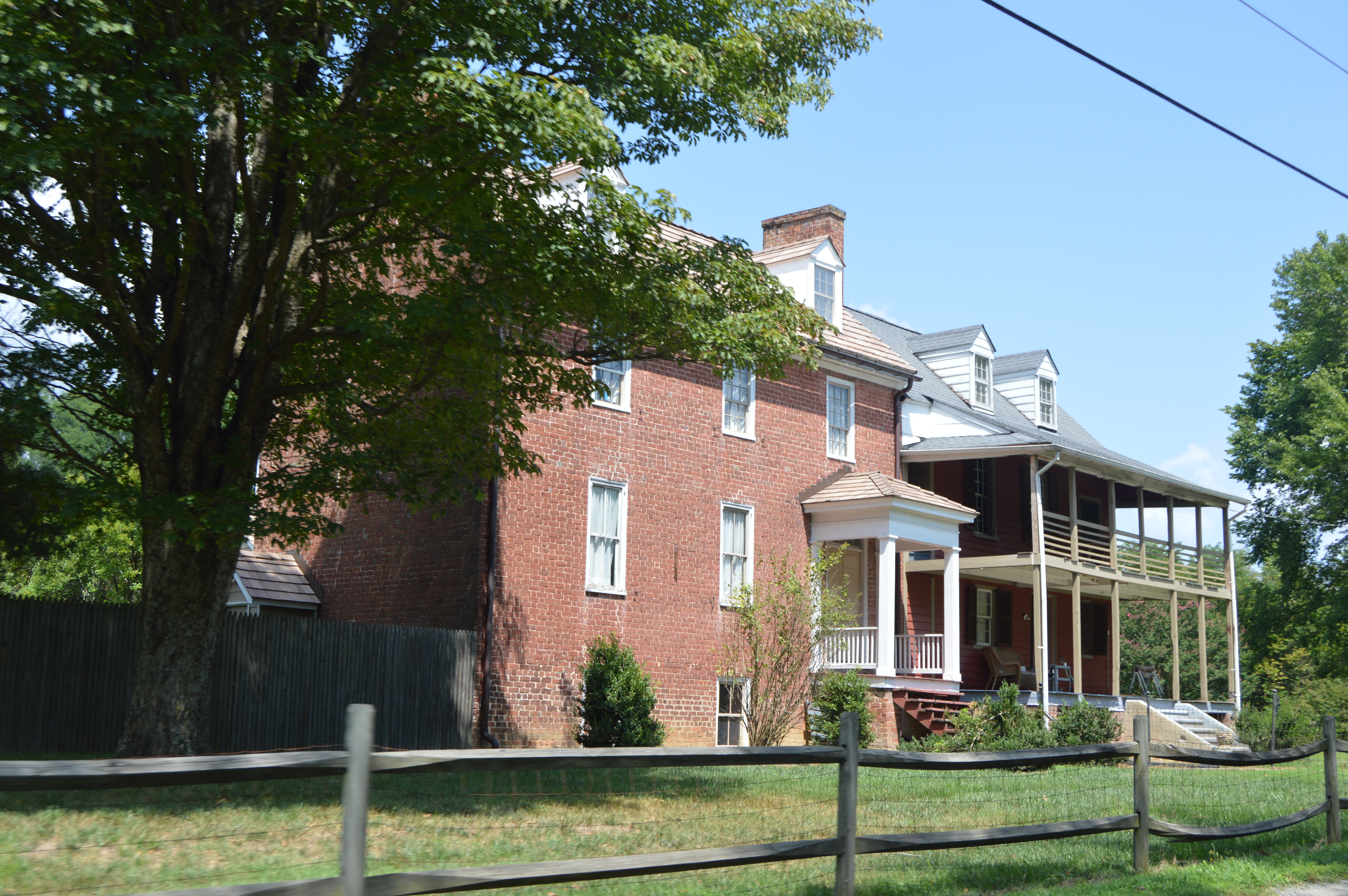
- Facade

- Location within Virginia Location within the United States
- Location: 3350-3360 Old Church Rd., Mechanicsville, Virginia
- Coordinates: 37°38′41″N 77°13′17″W
- Area: 27.3 acres (11.0 ha)
- Built: c. 1820
- Architectural style: Federal
- NRHP reference No.: 16000260
- Added to NRHP: May 16, 2016

The Tavern at Old Church is a historic 19th-century tavern complex at 3350-3360 Old Church Road east of Mechanicsville, Virginia in the hamlet of Old Church. The property includes a Federal-era tavern building built in two stages, a wood-frame structure built about 1820, and an attached brick structure built by 1830. Also included on the property are a suite of period outbuildings, a particular rarity for surviving rural 19th-century taverns in Virginia.

The property was listed on the National Register of Historic Places in 2016.

== See also ==
- National Register of Historic Places listings in Hanover County, Virginia
