= Hanover Town, Virginia =

Archaeological site in Virginia, United States

- Hanover Town
- U.S. National Register of Historic Places
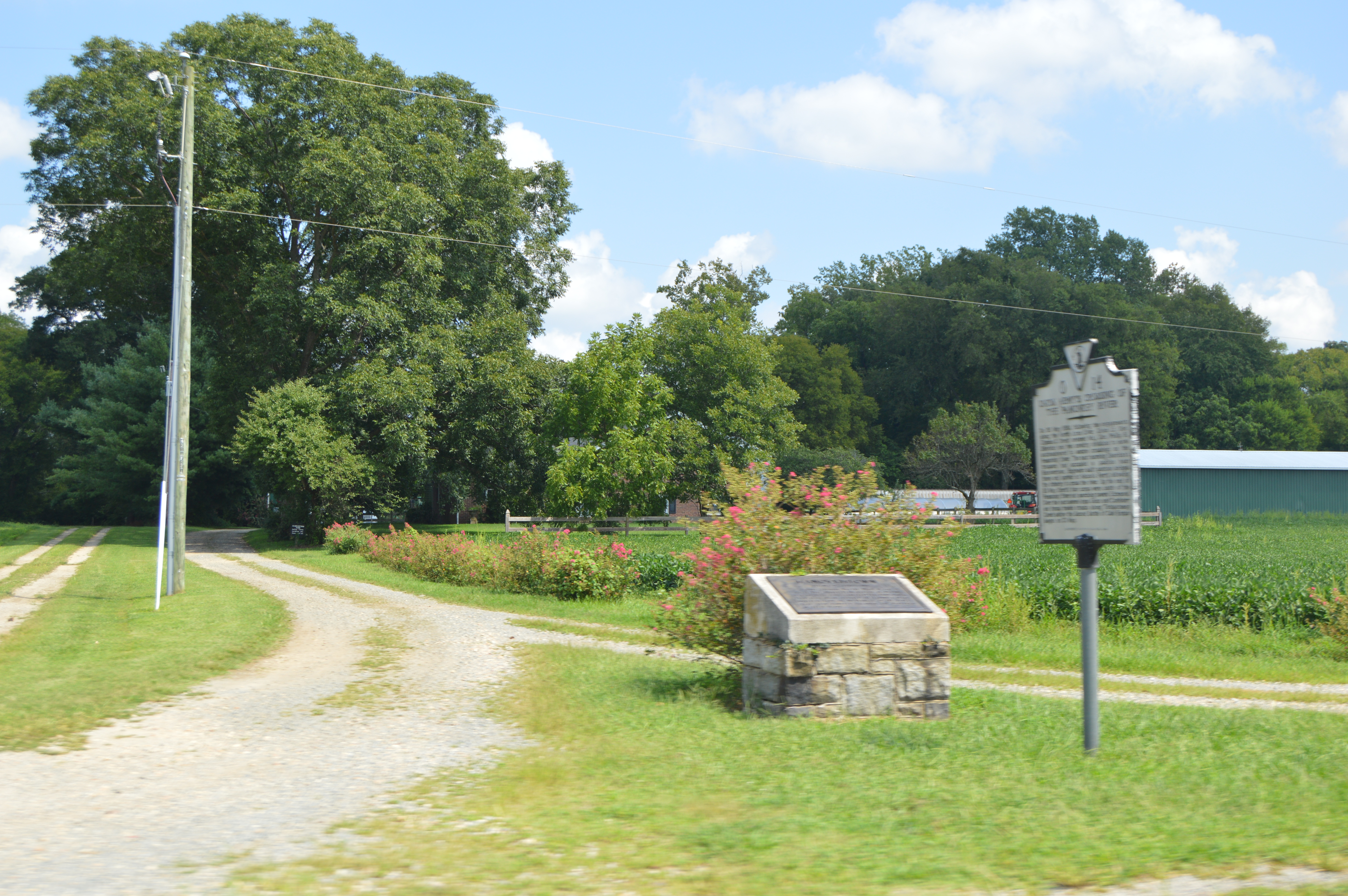
- Townsite with two historical markers

- Location within Virginia Location within the United States
- Nearest city: Mechanicsville, Virginia
- Area: 85 acres (34 ha)
- NRHP reference No.: 74002122
- Added to NRHP: September 17, 1974

Hanover Town is a former colonial-era town in Hanover County, Virginia. It was located on the upper Pamunkey River on land originally granted to John Page in 1672. Before being called Hanover Town, the location was originally known as "Page's Warehouse." By the time of the 1730 Tobacco Inspection Act there was a tobacco warehouse at the site, referred to as "Crutchfield's" after the tobacco inspector John Crutchfield. The town was chartered in 1762. The town was raided by British forces during the American Revolutionary War, and its fortunes declined in the years after independence because of silting in the river, resulting in its eventual abandonment.

The town site was listed on the National Register of Historic Places in 1974.

== See also ==
- National Register of Historic Places listings in Hanover County, Virginia
- List of ghost towns in Virginia
