= Dewberry (Beaverdam, Virginia) =

Historic house in Virginia, United States

- U.S. National Register of Historic Places
- Virginia Landmarks Register
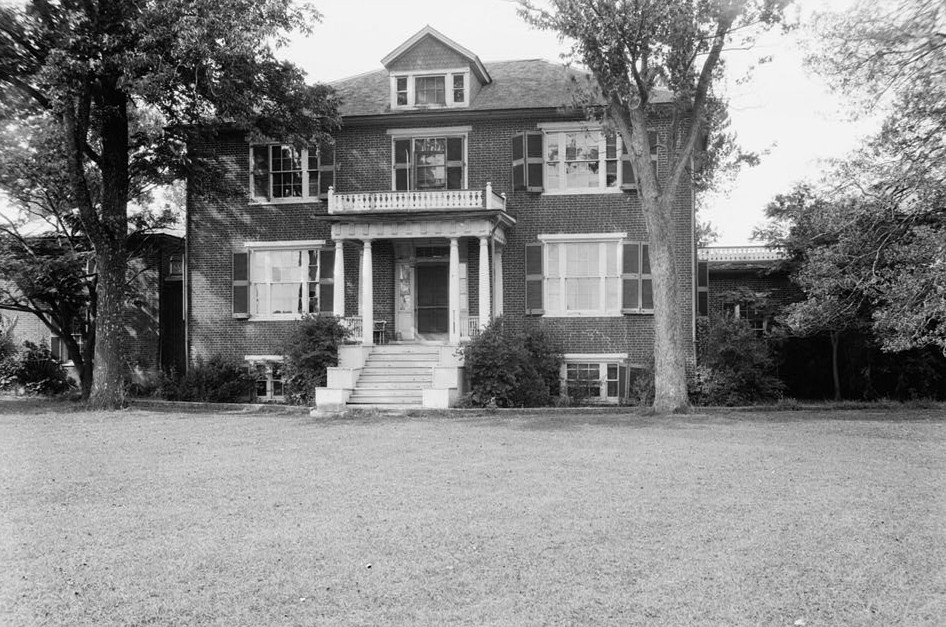
- Dewberry, HABS Photo

- Location within Virginia Location within the United States
- Location: Approximately 1 mi. NE of jct. of VA 738 and VA 601, Beaverdam, Virginia
- Coordinates: 37°53′47″N 77°35′24″W
- Area: 481.5 acres (194.9 ha)
- Built: 1833
- Architectural style: Early Classical Revival
- NRHP reference No.: 96000576
- VLR No.: 042-0007

Significant dates
- Added to NRHP: May 23, 1996
- Designated VLR: March 20, 1996

Dewberry is a historic home and approximately 480-acre farm located at Beaverdam in western Hanover County, Virginia.

== History ==
It was built in 1833 for the Rev. John Cooke, first rector of the now-historic Trinity Church nearby (Rev. Cooke laying the cornerstone in 1830). In 1831, Rev. Cooke married the widowed Elizabeth Edmonia Churchill Berkeley, who had inherited about 227 acres from her late husband. Rev. Cooke was an avid gardener, and some of the boxwoods in the formal garden date from his era. His widow purchased the property from his estate when he died in 1861, and bequeathed it to her daughters, one of whom owned it until nearly 1906. However, the property had several different owners in the early 20th century, before its purchase by Samuel Dixon in 1920, who restored and modified the existing structures, as well as constructed a dairy and made provision for electricity. His descendants still lived on the property in 1996 when it was listed in the National Register of Historic Places .

== Architecture ==
The brick dwelling has a five-part Palladian-design. The two-story, three-bay, hip-roofed, central block connects to two-story flanking wings by one-story, one-bay hyphens. The property also contains contributing formal gardens, a small brick outbuilding, and slave quarters.
