= Polegreen Church =

Archaeological site in Virginia, United States

- Hanover Meeting House
- U.S. National Register of Historic Places
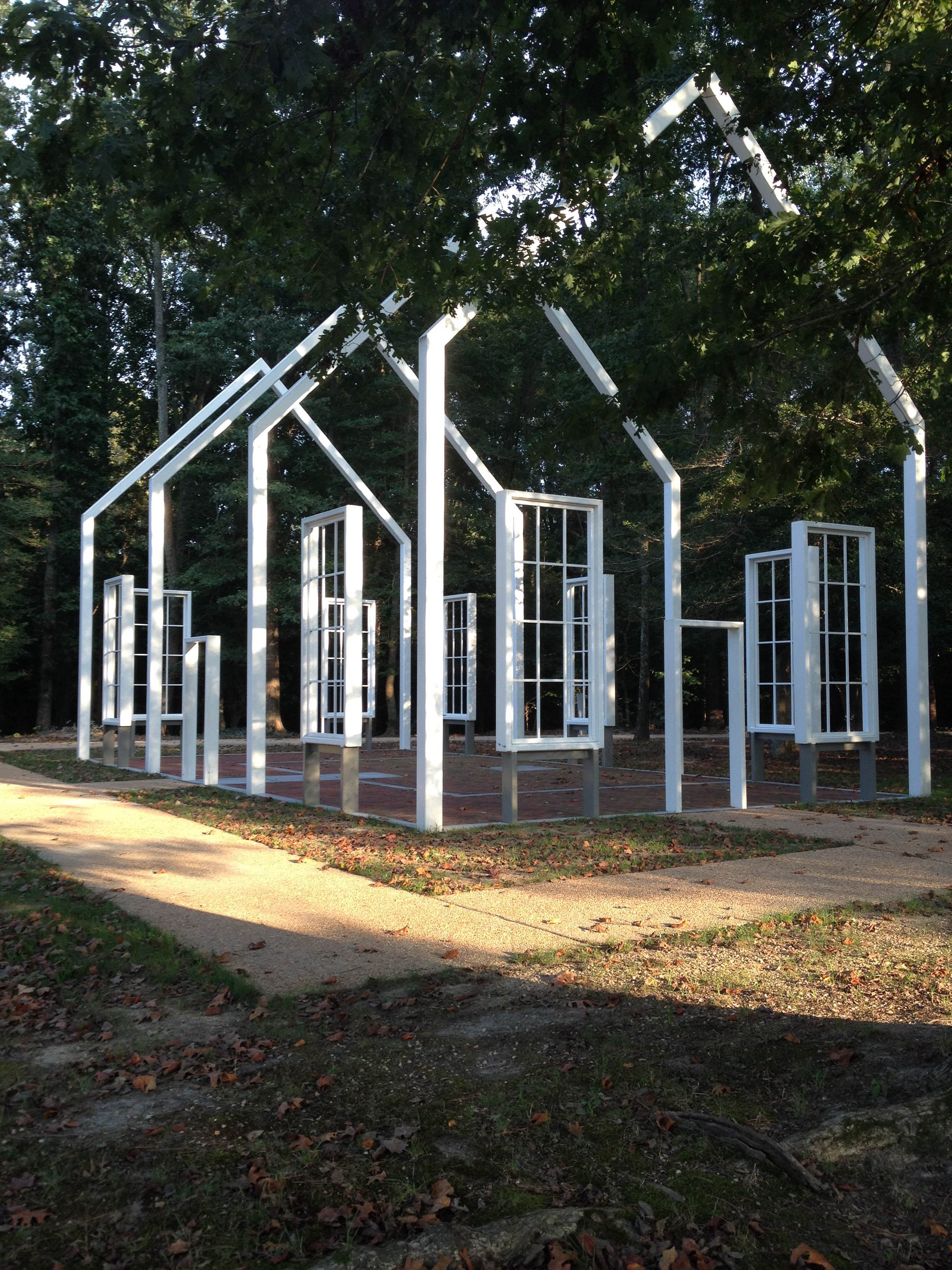
- 6411 Heatherwood Drive, Mechanicsville, VA

- Location within Virginia Location within the United States
- Nearest city: Mechanicsville, Virginia
- Coordinates: 37.645398°N 77.33041°W
- Area: 3.5 acres (1.4 ha)
- Built: 1743
- NRHP reference No.: 91001089
- Added to NRHP: September 4, 1991

The Polegreen Church, also known as the Hanover Meeting House (and locally as the "ghost church"), is the site of what may be the first non-Anglican church in Virginia. It was named after a 17th-century landowner, George Polegreen.

After Rev. George Whitefield preached at Bruton Parish Church at Williamsburg during the First Great Awakening, and his sermons were published, local mason Samuel Morris built a reading room or log cabin near Mechanicsville in rural Hanover County. In 1743, Virginia's colonial assembly permitted religious dissenters four meeting houses: three in Hanover County (including this one) and one in Henrico County; they were sometimes called "Morris churches".

Pennsylvania Presbyterian missionary Samuel Davies, one of the first non-Anglican ministers licensed in Virginia, evangelized in Hanover County and used this as his base from 1743 to 1759. Patrick Henry attended services here with his mother, and credited Davies for his oratorical skills. In 1755, Davies helped organize what came to be known as the Hanover Presbytery, encompassing all Presbyterian ministers in Virginia and North Carolina. He also became known for writing hymns, and for educating slaves (unlike Methodist and Baptist evangelists).

During the American Civil War, battle lines formed on opposite sides of Totopotomoy creek during the 1864 Overland Campaign as the Union army advanced on Richmond. Polegreen Church stood between them. A Confederate artillery shell fired to dislodge Union sharpshooters by a man whose father had been baptized at Polegreen hit the wooden building, which burned to the ground. The congregation could not afford to rebuild it.

An open-air design of steel beams painted white to show the historic structure's former dimensions has been erected at the site, along with a visitor center and signage concerning religious persecution and freedom in Western civilization. The site now hosts various lectures (including on religious freedom in Virginia), as well as weddings and other private functions. The Polegreen Church site was listed on the National Register of Historic Places in 1991. It is open to the public free of charge.

== See also ==
- National Register of Historic Places listings in Hanover County, Virginia
