= Ashland UDC Jefferson Davis Highway Marker =

Site in Hanover County, Virginia

- Jefferson Davis Highway Marker
- U.S. National Register of Historic Places
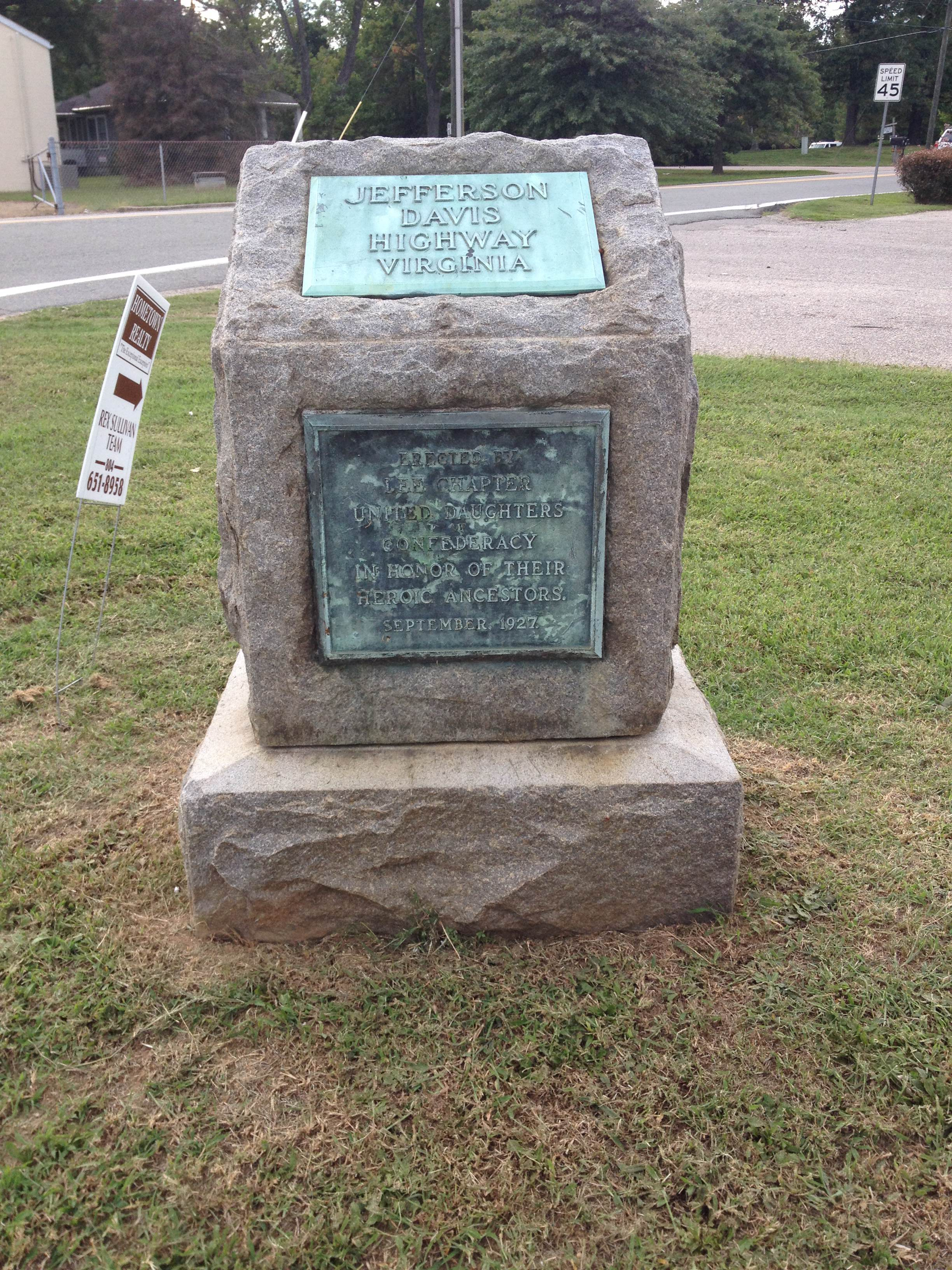
- Jefferson Davis Highway marker at the intersection of Washington Highway (US Route 1) and Cedar Lane (Virginia Route 623) near Ashland, Virginia.

- Location within Virginia
- Nearest city: Ashland, Virginia
- Coordinates: 37°41′22″N 77°27′45″W
- Area: less than one acre
- Built: 1927; 99 years ago
- MPS: UDC Commemorative Highway Markers along the Jefferson Davis Highway in Virginia
- NRHP reference No.: 13000642
- Added to NRHP: August 27, 2013

The Jefferson Davis Highway Marker is a commemorative marker on the Jefferson Davis Highway, in Hanover County, Virginia, near Ashland. It is a 42-inch-high (1.1 m) gray granite stone, with a slanted top, with two bronze plaques. The Jefferson Davis Highway was conceived and marked by the United Daughters of the Confederacy, as a counter to the Lincoln Highway in the north, during 1913–1925. In that era, named highways were being marked as automobile travel increased, and the advent of numbered highways eventually loomed. The marker was placed at the junction of what is now US Route 1 and Cedar Lane (Virginia Route 623), between Richmond and Ashland, in 1927. It has been moved twice: in the 1970s it was moved to accommodate the widening of Route 1, and it was moved across Route 1 in the 1980s.

The marker is one of a number of markers studied in a National Park Service study, UDC Commemorative Highway Markers along the Jefferson Davis Highway in Virginia.

== See also ==
- National Register of Historic Places listings in Hanover County, Virginia
