= Ashland Historic District =

Historic district in Virginia, United States

- U.S. National Register of Historic Places
- U.S. Historic district
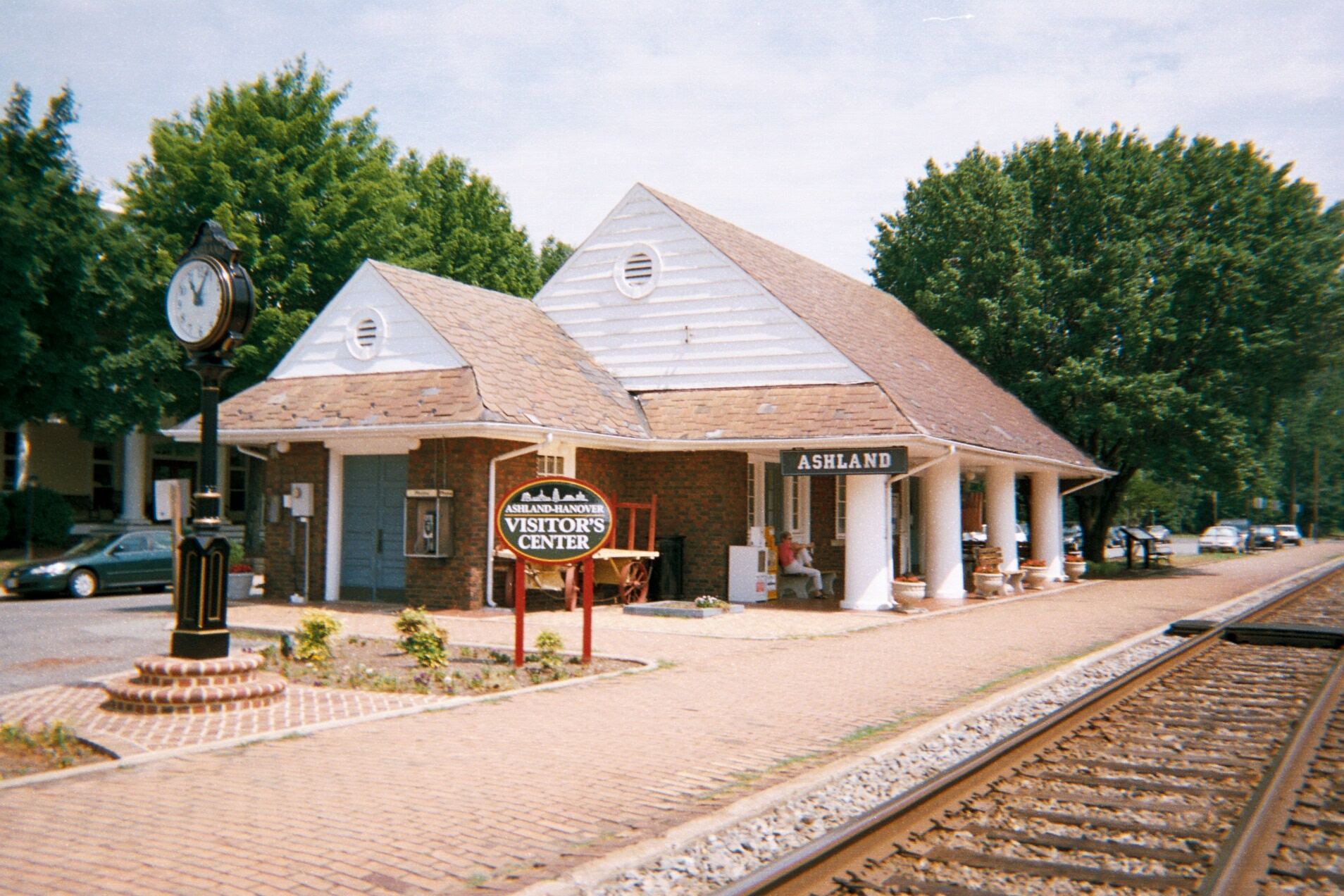

- Location within Virginia Location within the United States
- Location: Center, Racecourse, James, Howard, Clay Sts., Hanover and Railroad Aves., Ashland, Virginia
- Coordinates: 37°45′30″N 77°28′50″W
- Area: 159 acres (64 ha)
- Architectural style: Late 19th And 20th Century Revivals, Late Victorian, Early Commercial
- NRHP reference No.: 83003284
- Added to NRHP: February 11, 1983

The Ashland Historic District encompasses the historic central core of Ashland, Virginia, now a suburb of nearby Richmond. The town developed in the mid-19th century as a summer resort area, but in the late 19th and early 20th century it grew more significantly as a streetcar suburb of its larger neighbor. Its central core had its biggest building boom between about 1875 and 1920, and contains a large assortment of high-quality residences in Colonial Revival, Queen Anne, and other styles. The district is centered on the junction of Center Street with Virginia State Route 54, and has a roughly cruciform shape covering 159 acres (64 ha).

The district was listed on the National Register of Historic Places in 1983.

== See also ==
- National Register of Historic Places listings in Hanover County, Virginia
