= Laurel Meadow (Richmond, Virginia) =

Historic house in Virginia, United States

- U.S. National Register of Historic Places
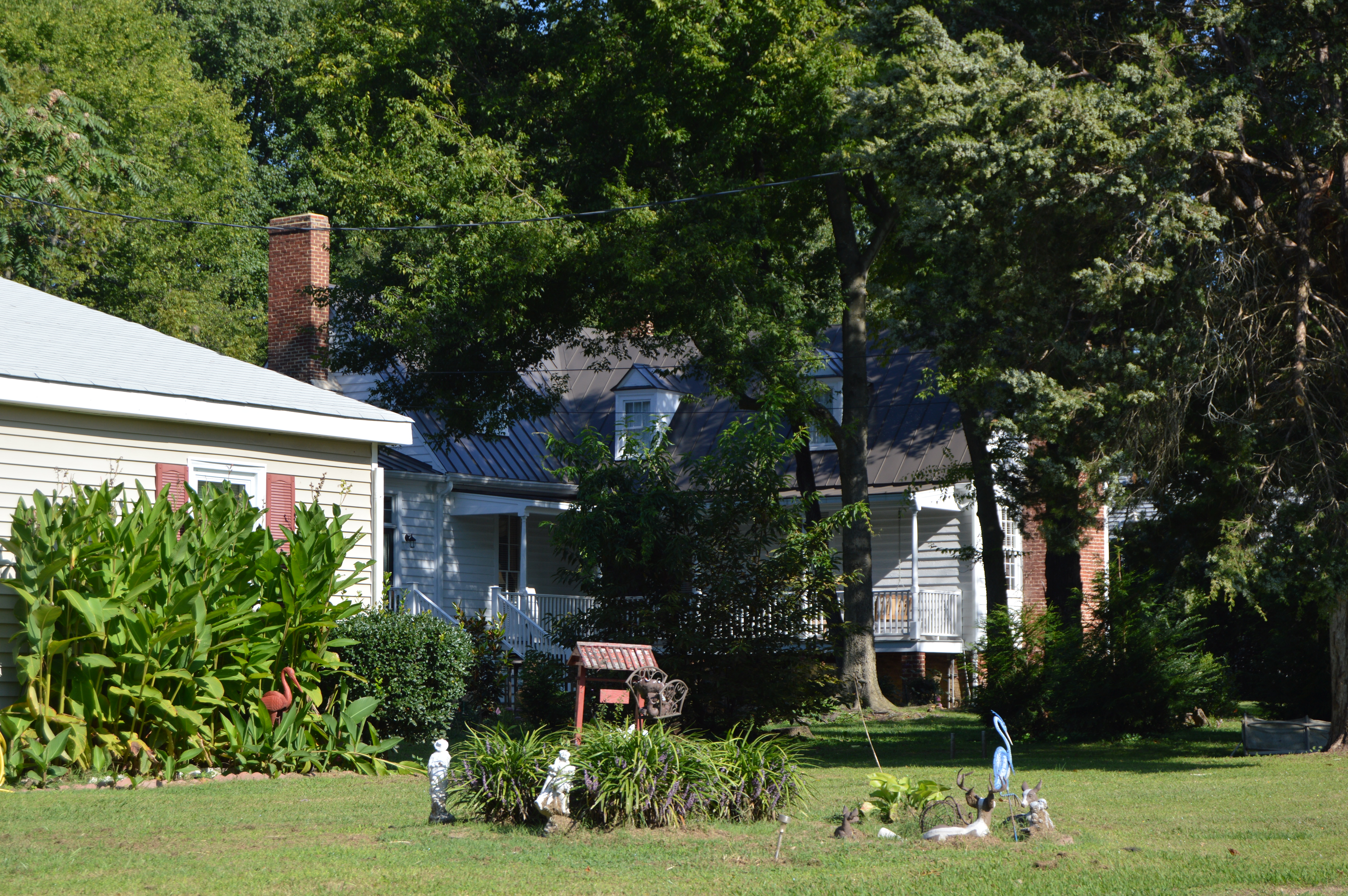
- Southern and eastern sides

- Location within Virginia Location within the United States
- Location: 1640 Bramwell Road, Richmond, Virginia
- Coordinates: 37°29′8″N 77°30′27″W
- Area: 1 acre (0.40 ha)
- Built: c. 1776
- Architectural style: Georgian
- NRHP reference No.: 13001165
- Added to NRHP: February 5, 2014

Laurel Meadow is an historic house at 1640 Bramwell Road in Richmond, Virginia. The oldest portion of this wood-frame house was built prior to 1776, when the property was acquired by David Patteson. Patteson, who had been a steward of the Westover Plantation of William Byrd III, was an officer in the Revolutionary War, a Colonel in the Virginia Militia, a member of the House of Delegates, and represented Chesterfield County at the Virginia Constitutional Ratification Convention of 1788. He voted to ratify the Constitution. The building has three portions, forming an L shape. The oldest portion is the Northwest wing, which is 1.5 stories and now houses a library and stair hall below and a sitting room above, which was probably at first a bedroom. A dining room and upper bedchamber were believed to have been added by Patteson. A third wing including a lower passage and parlor below and an upper passage and bedchamber above, was added to the Northeast section early in the 19th century, and the building was significantly restyled, giving it a Federal interior. The house is one of only a small number of colonial-era houses in the Richmond area.

The house was listed on the National Register of Historic Places in 2014.

== See also ==
- Laurel Meadow, a farmstead in eastern Hanover County
- National Register of Historic Places listings in Richmond, Virginia
