= Hickory Hill (Ashland, Virginia) =

Historic house in Virginia, United States

- U.S. National Register of Historic Places
- Virginia Landmarks Register
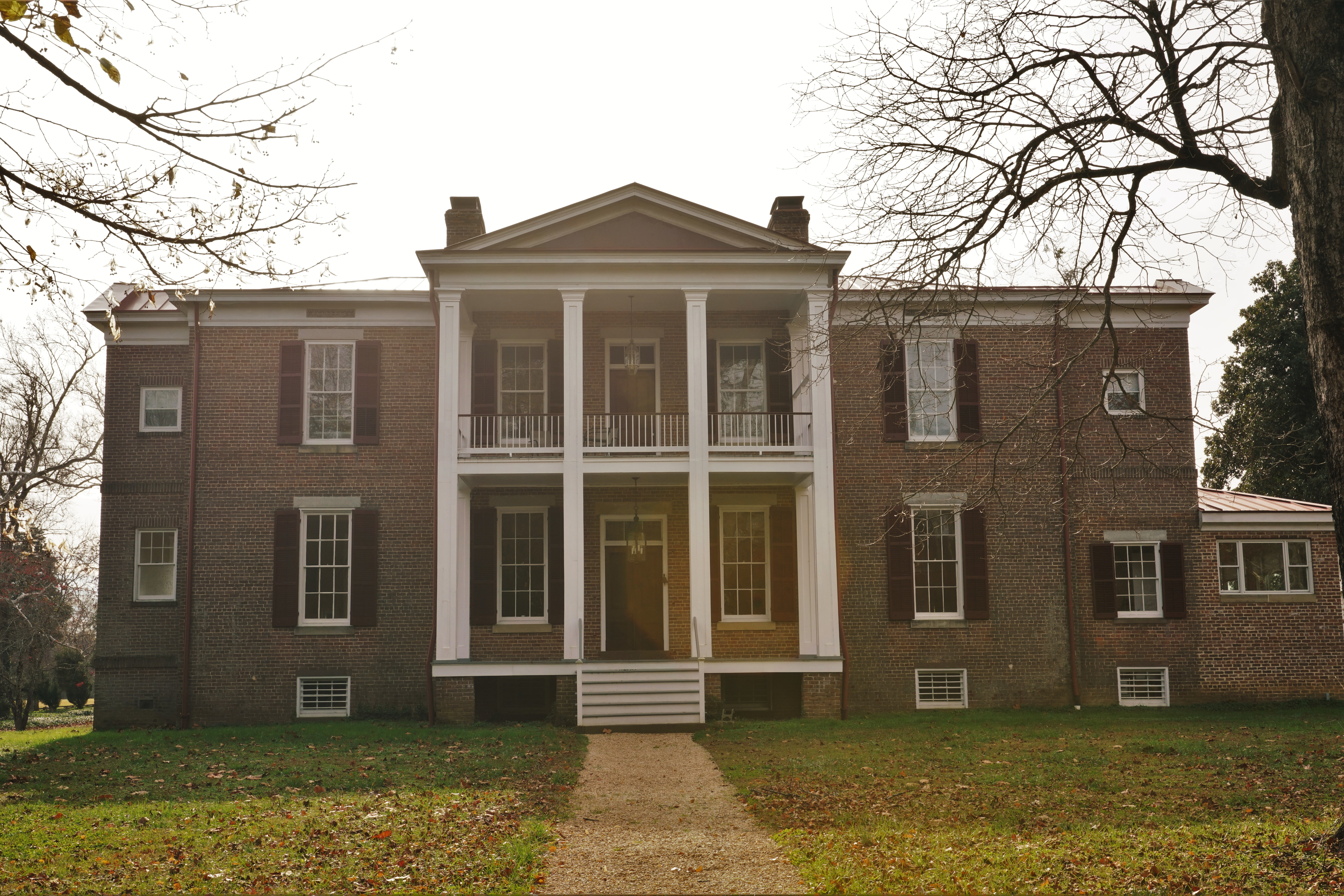
- Hickory Hill in 2021

- Location within Virginia Location within the United States
- Location: E of Ashland off VA 646, Ashland, Virginia
- Coordinates: 37°46′28″N 77°24′47″W
- Area: 640 acres (260 ha)
- Built: 1820
- NRHP reference No.: 74002121
- VLR No.: 042-0100

Significant dates
- Added to NRHP: November 21, 1974
- Designated VLR: September 17, 1974

Hickory Hill is an estate in Hanover County, Virginia. The 3,300 acre former plantation is located approximately 20 miles (32 km) north of the independent city of Richmond and 5 miles (8.0 km) east of the incorporated town of Ashland. The property was listed in the National Register of Historic Places and the Virginia Landmarks Register in 1974.

== History ==
The Hickory Hill property was long an appendage to Shirley Plantation in Charles City County, much of it having come into possession of Robert Carter by a deed dated March 2, 1734. Carter gave the plantation as a wedding gift to his daughter Anne Butler Carter (1797-1868) and her husband, William Fanning (W. F.) Wickham (1793-1880), a lawyer and planter. The dowry included all the slaves on the plantation. From September 1828 until January 29, 1864, Wickham kept a close record of the names, dates of death, and, often, kinships, of the slave population on the estate. Their son Williams Carter Wickham became an unionist delegate to the Virginia Secession Convention of 1861, then a Confederate General who was captured while recovering from his wounds on the property, but nearly immediately paroled, and after the war became an influential railroad man. His son (W.F. Wickham's grandson) Henry T. Wickham (1849-1943), who was raised at Hickory Hill when it often hosted future general Robert E. Lee, eventually continued the farm, as well as practiced as a lawyer with the Chesapeake and Ohio Railway and became one of Virginia's longest serving state legislators (including terms as president pro tempore of the Virginia Senate). The Wickham family continued to reside on the estate until selling the property in the early 2000s.

At its height, the estate consisted of 3,500 acres (1,400 ha) of land, and by 1860 was one of the largest plantations in Virginia, and had over 200 slaves working on it, only one of two such estates in Hanover County with that number of slaves, and one of nine in the entire state.

Hickory Hill produced wheat (its major crop), corn, oats, and a small amount of tobacco. Fruits and vegetables were also grown, but probably for consumption on the plantation. Unlike other Hanover County plantations, which sold locally, Hickory Hill sold its produce in Richmond where it brought a higher price. It had its own stop, Wickham Station, just below the manor house on the former Virginia Central Railroad.

== Cemetery ==
Included on the grounds of the estate is the Hickory Hill Slave and African American Cemetery on Providence Church Road, in use from circa 1820 through circa 1938. The 4.25 acres (1.72 ha) cemetery is enclosed by a white vinyl post-and-board fence which was constructed some time after 2010. Some burials may have taken place outside of the fenced-in area. Not all burial sites have gravestones, some are mere depressions in the ground. A survey found about 149 interment sites, with the strong possibility of there being more. However, poor maintenance in the 20th century, especially loss of a temporary brush arbor visible in 1980, perhaps associated with logging damage in that decade, took its toll.
