= Immanuel Episcopal Church (Mechanicsville, Virginia) =

Historic church in Virginia, US

- U.S. National Register of Historic Places
- Virginia Landmarks Register
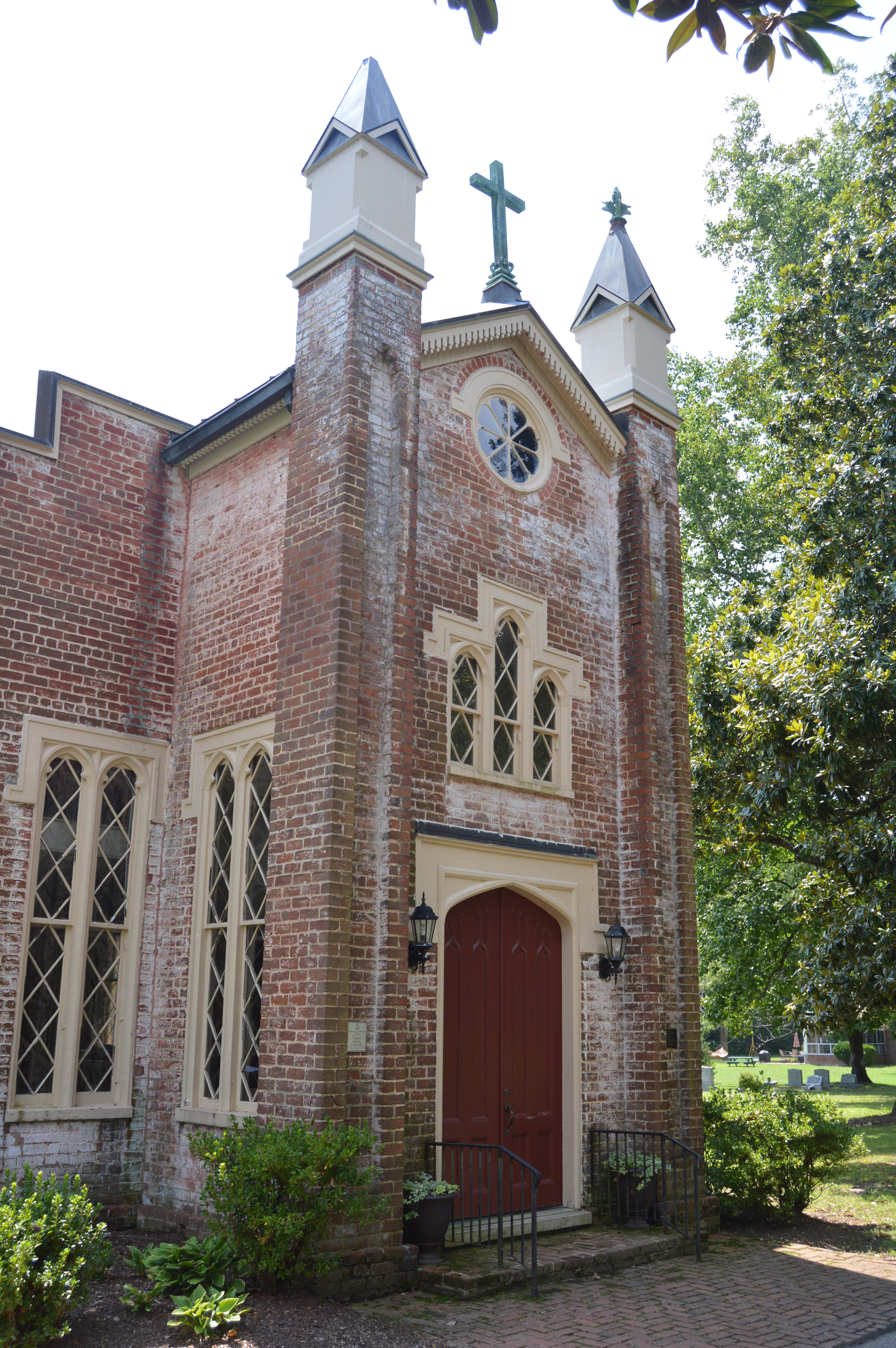
- Facade

- Location within Virginia Location within the United States
- Location: SR 606, 1.7 mi. E of jct. with US 360, Mechanicsville, Virginia
- Coordinates: 37°38′35″N 77°12′59″W
- Built: 1853, 1881, 1916, 1967
- Architectural style: Late Gothic Revival
- NRHP reference No.: 96000577
- VLR No.: 042-0125

Significant dates
- Added to NRHP: May 23, 1996
- Designated VLR: December 6, 1995

Immanuel Episcopal Church is a historic Episcopal church and cemetery located near Mechanicsville, Hanover County, Virginia.

== History ==
It was built in 1853 largely through the efforts of George Washington Bassett, grandnephew of Martha Custis Washington, who matched a contribution from St. Paul's Church in Richmond, Virginia. Bassett's farm Clover Lea included the site of the first Anglican church in the area (circa 1684 and about a furlong away). However, disestablishment after the American Revolutionary War led to the abandonment of many structures, as the Anglican Church nearly disappeared despite its change to the Episcopal Church. Its replacement by the 1840s was a dilapidated wood building at the crossroads of Old Church and shared by Episcopalians, Baptist and Campbellite (later Disciples of Christ) congregations. Rt.Rev. John Johns, assistant to Rt.Rev. William Meade consecrated the building on April 3, 1854, with Rev. William Norwood, retired from Monumental Church and St. Paul's in Richmond, conducting monthly services for several years. The church was named Immanuel to distinguish it from what had been the Upper Church of St. Paul's parish at Hanover Courthouse.

During the American Civil War, the congregation had definite Confederate sympathies. Rev. David Carraway served as rector from 1857 until his death in 1869, and before the Battle of Cold Harbor in mid-1864 was only allowed to visit Mr. Bassett and his family under Union guard. Immanuel Church also served as a hospital during the conflict. Battles were fought nearby in the Peninsular Campaign in 1862, and especially the Overland Campaign in 1864.

After the war, the devastated area took decades to recover. Bishop John Johns was unwilling to accept funds from the national church, but the diocese's Domestic and Foreign Missionary Fund covered some of the parish's expenses. The Rev. Edwin Habersham nonetheless was able to secure needed repairs and put the parish onto sound financial footing before moving to Oregon. The next long-term rector for Immanuel Episcopal Church and several other parishes nearby (including St. James the Less Church in nearby Ashland, Virginia, as well as Saint Peter's, New Kent and St. David's, Aylett, King William county.

From 1881 until 1904 (when he inherited property in Maryland and sought transfer to the Diocese of Easton), the shared rector was Rev. Sewell Hepburn (now more famous for his relative, Katharine Hepburn). In 1924, the parish called Rev. Samuel Chilton, who served for seventeen years before accepting a call as suffragan bishop of Virginia. His successor, Rev. Southall, served for many years before resigning in 1941 to become a diocesan Archdeacon. At various times in the early 20th century, this parish was paired with St. Paul's Church in Hanover, or with St. David's Church in Aylett. In mid-century, it was paired instead with the new Church of the creator in Mechanicsville or St. David's, but Richmond's suburbs were expanding to include this formerly rural area. By 1985 both congregations had become full-time positions, and the parish received a significant bequest after the sale of Clover Lea, which enabled much-needed repairs. Rev. Susan Goff, who served as Immanuel's rector and Dean of Region 11, was elected suffragan bishop of Virginia, a position she continues to hold today.

The current rectory was built in 1957 (to replace a turn of the century rectory) and the current parish house in 1982 (to replace a building completed in 1906). The St. Francis Garden for cremated remains was added in 1998.

== Architecture ==
The one-story, brick building was constructed in the Gothic Revival style. Additions made to the original church in 1881, 1916, and 1967, have given the building a "T"-plan. Surrounding the church on three sides is the contributing church cemetery, which includes several Confederate graves.

It was listed on the National Register of Historic Places in 1996.
