= Sharp's Oakland =

Historic house in Virginia, United States

- U.S. National Register of Historic Places
- Virginia Landmarks Register
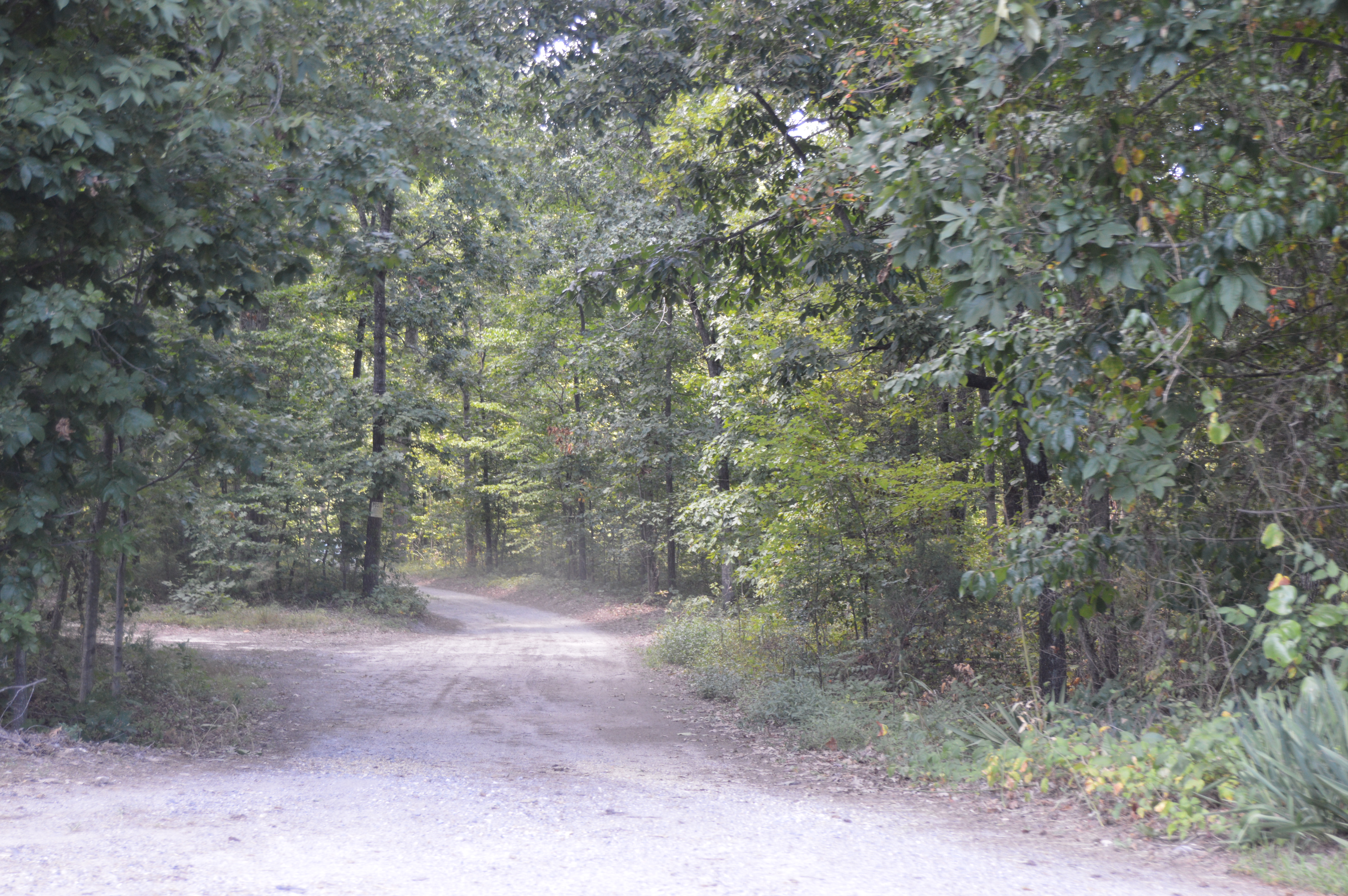
- Property entrance

- Location within Virginia Location within the United States
- Location: 12308 Verdon Rd., Doswell, Virginia
- Coordinates: 37°53′56″N 77°30′49″W
- Area: 10 acres (4.0 ha)
- Architectural style: Second Empire
- NRHP reference No.: 01001514
- VLR No.: 042-0461

Significant dates
- Added to NRHP: January 24, 2002
- Designated VLR: June 13, 2001

Sharp's Oakland is a historic home located at Doswell, Hanover County, Virginia. It was built about 1890, and is a three-story, I-house frame dwelling in the Second Empire style. It features a high mansard roof still covered with patterned wooden shingles and a simple porch with Eastlake posts. Also on the property is a contributing slave quarter with a massive chimney.

It was listed on the National Register of Historic Places in 2002.
