= Selwyn (Mechanicsville, Virginia) =

Historic house in Virginia, United States

- U.S. National Register of Historic Places
- Virginia Landmarks Register
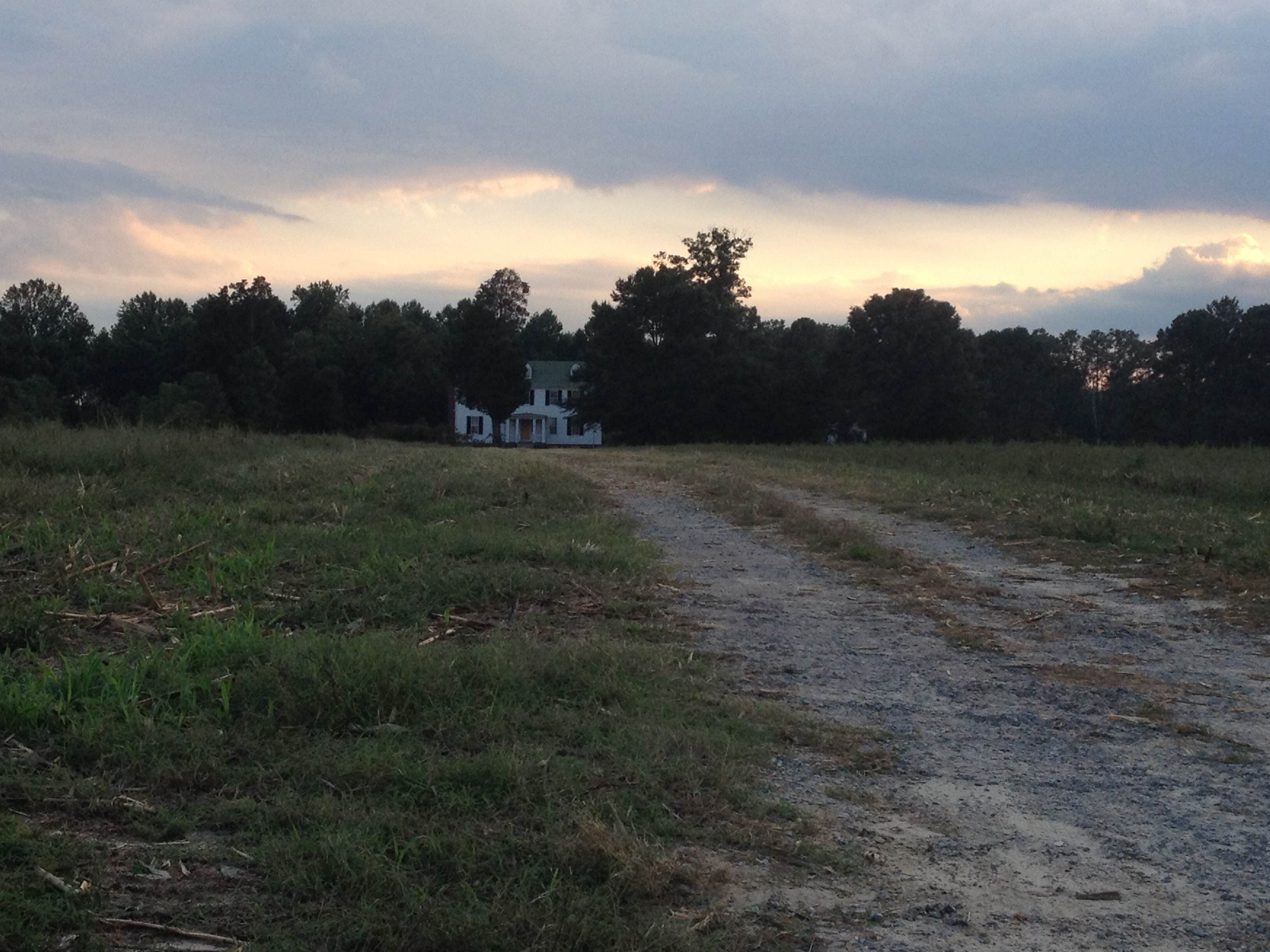

- Location within Virginia Location within the United States
- Location: 6279 Powhite Farm Dr., Mechanicsville, Virginia
- Coordinates: 37°34′57″N 77°19′12″W
- Area: 59.7 acres (24.2 ha)
- Built: c. 1820
- Architectural style: Federal, Greek Revival
- NRHP reference No.: 03000445
- VLR No.: 042-0120

Significant dates
- Added to NRHP: May 22, 2003
- Designated VLR: March 19, 2003

Selwyn is a historic home located near Mechanicsville, Hanover County, Virginia. It was built about 1820 and expanded in the 1850s. It is a large 2 1/2-story, five-bay, frame I-house dwelling in a combination of the Federal and Greek Revival styles. The house sits on a brick foundation, has a gable roof with dormers, and features exterior end chimneys. Also on the property is a contributing frame dairy.

It was listed on the National Register of Historic Places in 2003.
