= Church Quarter =

Historic house in Virginia, United States

- U.S. National Register of Historic Places
- Virginia Landmarks Register
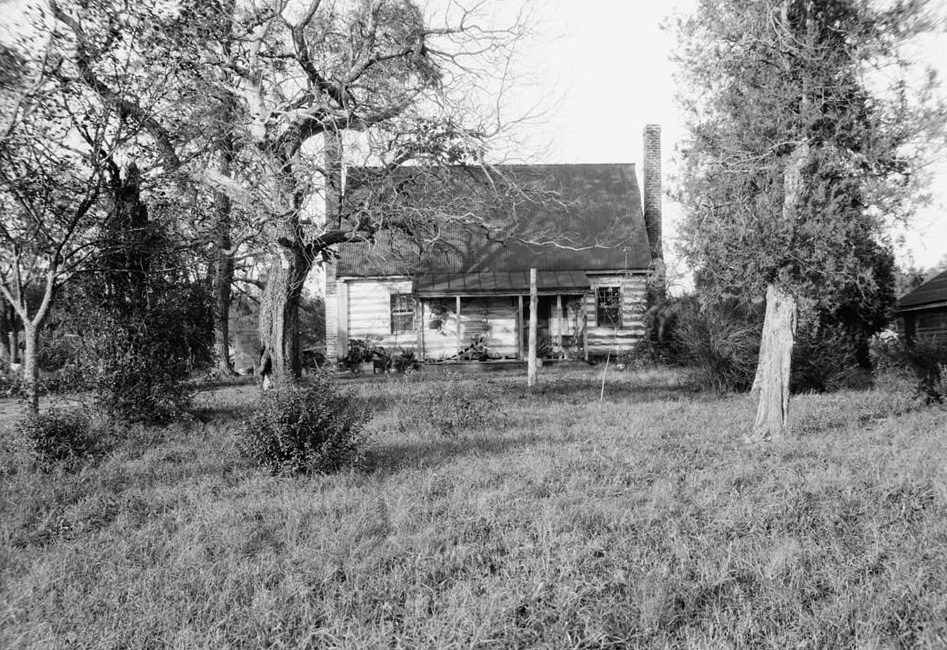
- Church Quarter, HABS Photo

- Location within Virginia Location within the United States
- Location: 12432 Old Ridge Rd., Doswell, Virginia
- Coordinates: 37°50′52″N 77°31′27″W
- Area: 3 acres (1.2 ha)
- Built: 1843
- NRHP reference No.: 00001436
- VLR No.: 042-0006

Significant dates
- Added to NRHP: November 22, 2000
- Designated VLR: September 13, 2000

Church Quarter is a historic home located at Doswell, Hanover County, Virginia. It was built in 1843, and is a one-story, three-bay, gable-roof, log dwelling. It has exposed logs with V-notching and two exterior end chimneys. Also on the property are contributing two late-19th / early-20th century outbuildings and the ruins of a brick orangery, known locally as the flower house.

The Scotchtown Chapter of the National Society Daughters of the American Revolution purchased Church Quarter in 1969 and has worked to restore the cabin and maintain it as a meeting house for the chapter. It was listed on the National Register of Historic Places in 2000.
