= Beaverdam, Virginia =

Unincorporated community in Virginia, United States

- Unincorporated community
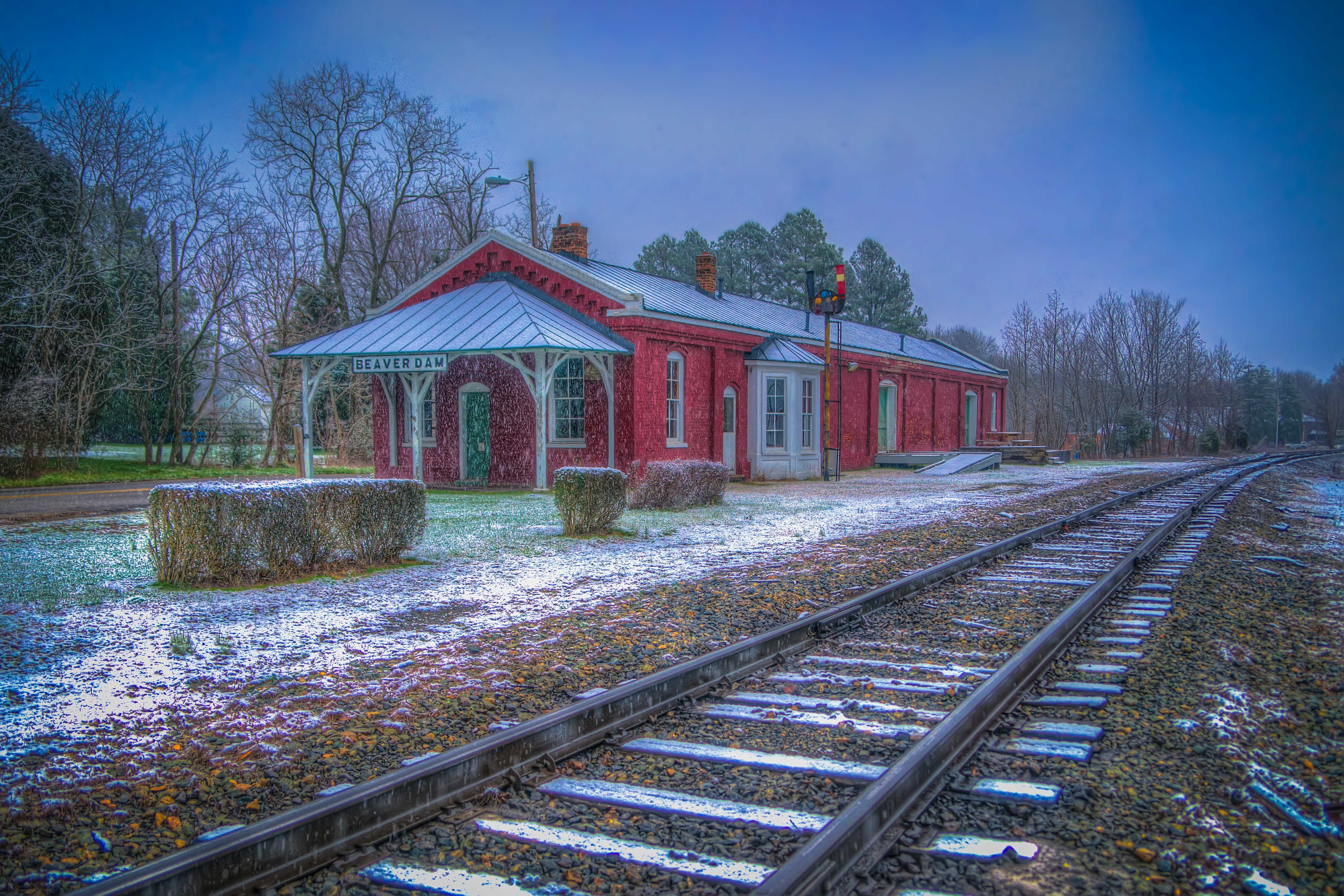
- Beaverdam station

- Location within Virginia Location within the United States
- Coordinates: 37°56′29″N 77°39′16″W
- Country: United States
- State: Virginia
- County: Hanover
- Elevation: 285 ft (87 m)
- Time zone: UTC-5 (Eastern (EST))
  - Summer (DST): UTC-4 (EDT)
- Area code: 804
- GNIS feature ID: 1492536

Beaverdam is a small unincorporated community in Hanover County in the central region of the U.S. state of Virginia. The community was named after the beaver dams in the area.

It is the location of four historic locations listed on the National Register of Historic Places: Scotchtown, a residence of Patrick Henry, the Beaverdam Depot, Dewberry, and Trinity Church. It was also the childhood home of Thomas Nelson Page, a notable author and American diplomat in the 20th century. Consisting primarily of farmland, today it is an outlying suburb of Richmond. The railroad still passes through, operated by the Buckingham Branch Railroad, a Virginia-based short line railroad.

On July 19, 1862, a New York regiment called the Harris Light Cavalry of the Union's Army of Virginia captured John S. Mosby at Beaver Dam Station. At that time, he was serving as a Captain under Col. Jeb Stuart and was carrying a letter from him commending him to Gen. Stonewall Jackson in hopes that Jackson would enable Mosby's vision of becoming a partisan ranger. Mosby was held at Old Capitol Prison in Washington, D.C. He was released in a prisoner exchange about ten days after his capture. [Mosby and Russell, 1917]

Beaverdam Elementary School of Hanover County Public Schools celebrated their centennial anniversary in 2006.

The former New York Jet, Damien Woody, lives here.

U. S. Racing Hall of Fame jockey Ted Atkinson (1916-2005) made his home in Beaverdam.

Beaverdam receives significantly more snow than other places in Hanover County [Senz, 2025], due in large part to the trees [Eakle, 2025].
