= Hanover Wayside =

- U.S. National Register of Historic Places
- U.S. Historic district
- Virginia Landmarks Register
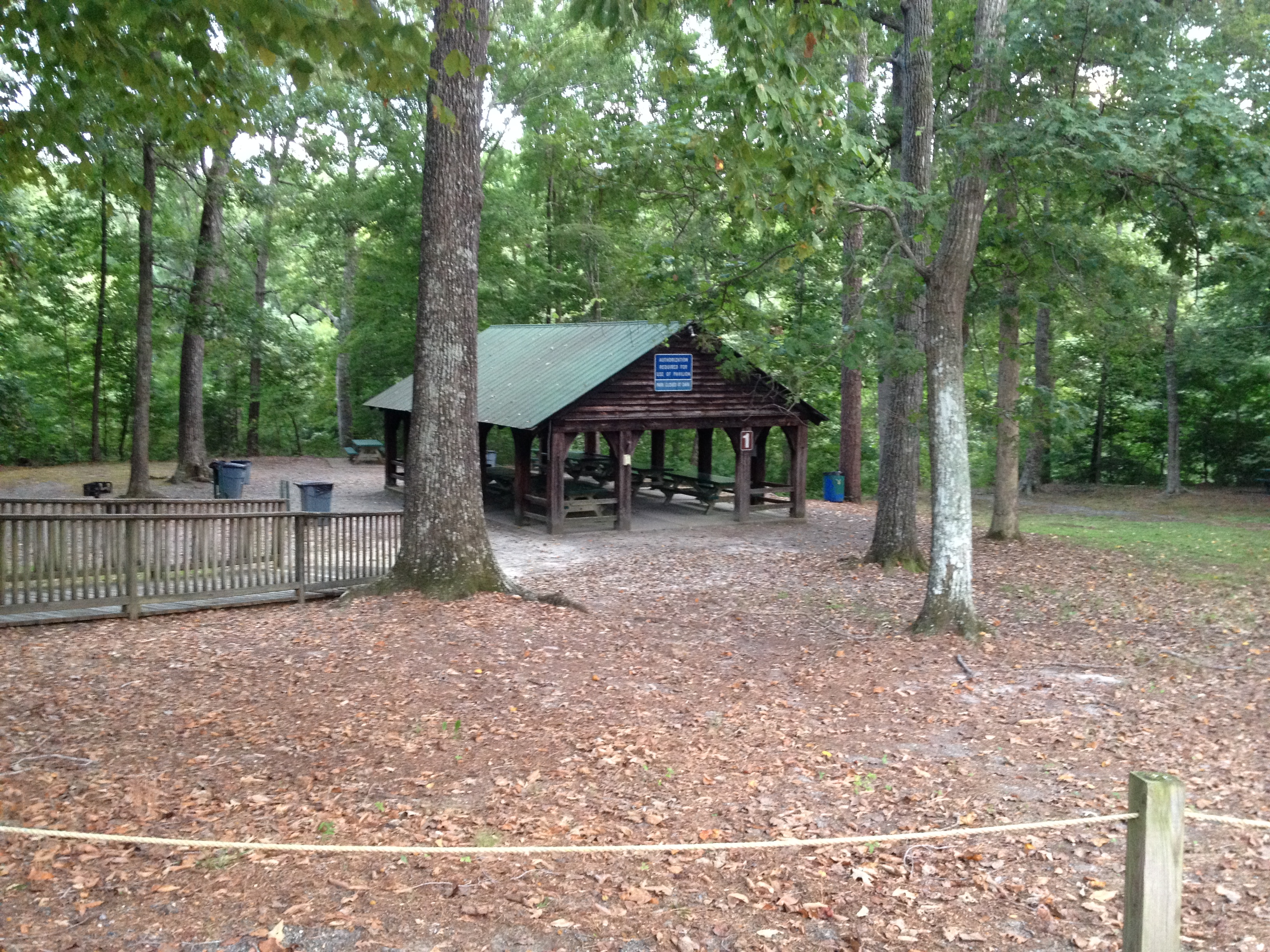
- Picnic area at the wayside

- Location within Virginia Location within the United States
- Location: 8225 Hanover Wayside Rd., near Hanover Courthouse, Virginia
- Coordinates: 37°49′09″N 77°41′04″W
- Area: 39.3 acres (15.9 ha)
- Built: 1937–1938
- Architectural style: NPS Rustic
- NRHP reference No.: 02001365
- VLR No.: 042-0286

Significant dates
- Added to NRHP: November 22, 2002
- Designated VLR: September 11, 2002

Hanover Wayside is a historic wayside and national historic district located near Hanover Courthouse, Hanover County, Virginia. The district includes five contributing buildings, one contributing site, and one contributing structure. It was built about 1937–1938 by the Civilian Conservation Corps (CCC) as a Recreation Demonstration Areas project. The buildings are in the rustic style and include the picnic shelter, wayside caretaker's house, public restroom, and garage.

It was listed on the National Register of Historic Places in 2002.
