= Oak Forest (Mechanicsville, Virginia) =

Historic house in Virginia, United States

- U.S. National Register of Historic Places
- Virginia Landmarks Register
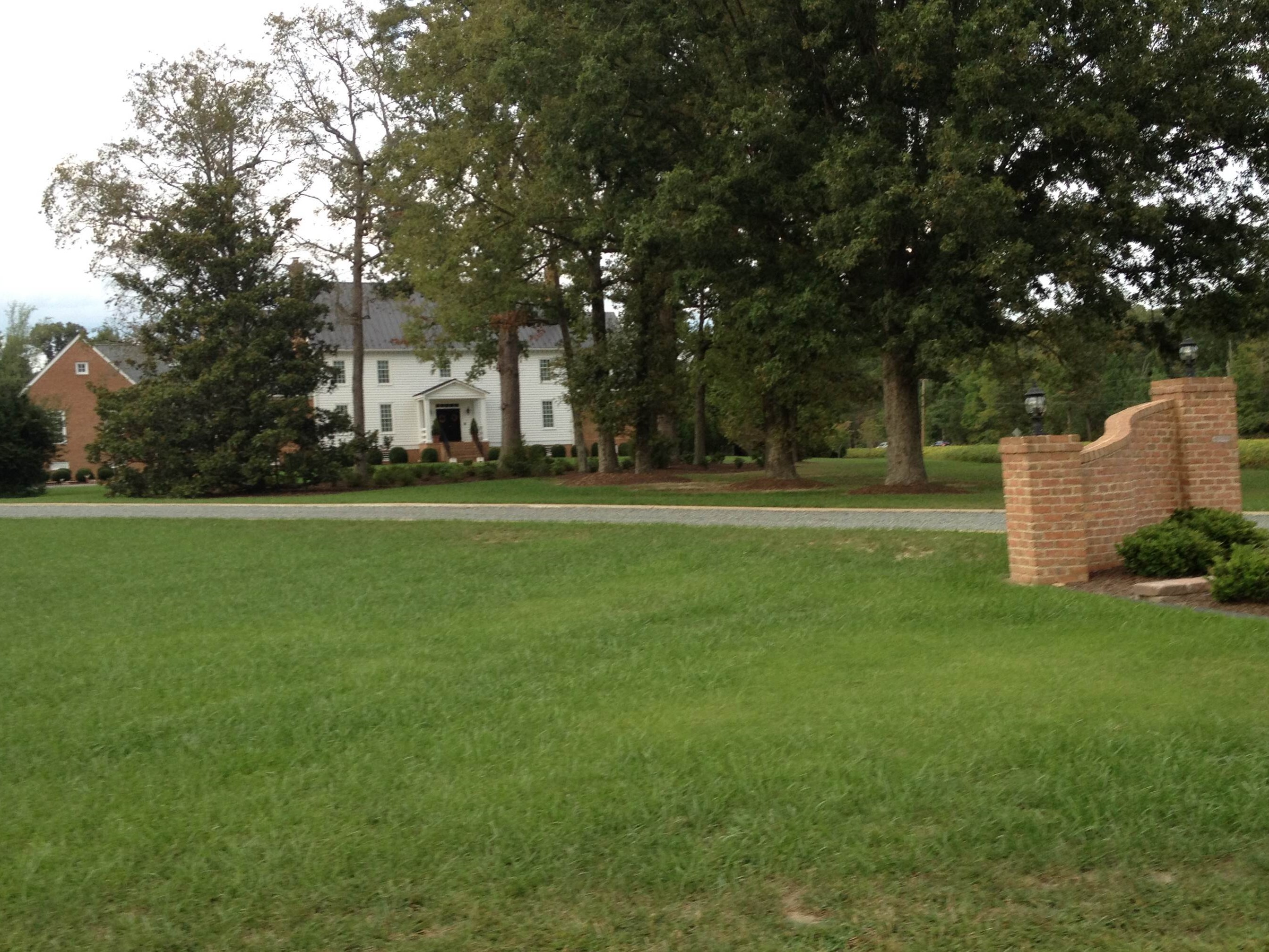

- Location within Virginia Location within the United States
- Interactive map showing the location of Oak Forest
- Location: 7400 Rural Point Road, near Mechanicsville, Virginia
- Coordinates: 37°40′28″N 77°20′53″W
- Area: 40 acres (16 ha)
- Built: 1828
- Architectural style: Federal
- NRHP reference No.: 99000964
- VLR No.: 042-0055

Significant dates
- Added to NRHP: August 23, 1999
- Designated VLR: June 16, 1999

Oak Forest is a historic home located near Mechanicsville, Hanover County, Virginia. It was built about 1828, and is a two-story, five-bay, frame I-house dwelling in the Federal style. The house sits on a brick foundation, has a standing seam metal gable roof, and exterior end chimneys. Also on the property is a contributing smokehouse.

It was listed on the National Register of Historic Places in 1999.
