= Cool Well =

Historic house in Virginia, United States

- U.S. National Register of Historic Places
- Virginia Landmarks Register
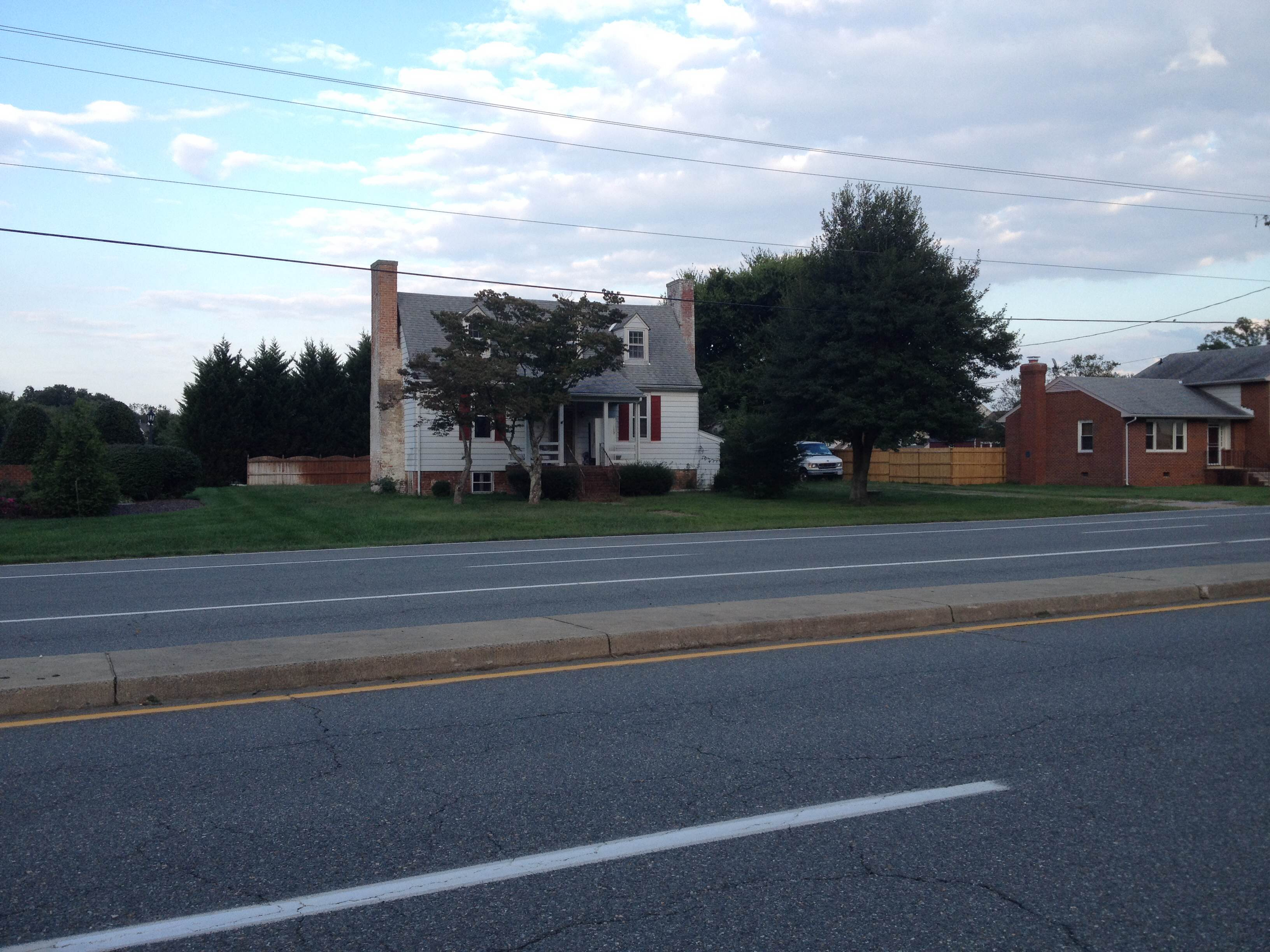

- Location within Virginia Location within the United States
- Location: 8198 Shady Grove Rd, near Mechanicsville, Virginia
- Coordinates: 37°37′36″N 77°22′35″W
- Area: 0.3 acres (0.12 ha)
- Built: 1834–1835
- Architectural style: Federal
- NRHP reference No.: 07000931
- VLR No.: 042-0248

Significant dates
- Added to NRHP: September 6, 2007
- Designated VLR: June 6, 2007

Cool Well is a historic home located near Mechanicsville, Hanover County, Virginia. It was built in 1834–1835, and is a small, 1 1/2-story, frame Tidewater cottage in the Federal style. The house sits on a brick foundation and has a gable roof with dormers.

It was listed on the National Register of Historic Places in 2007.
