= Greene Springs, Missouri =

Ghost town in the US state of Missouri

Coordinates: 37.8197602°N 94.1713335°W

Greene Springs is a ghost town in Vernon County, in the U.S. state of Missouri.

== History ==
Greene Springs was platted in 1886, and named after a nearby spring of the same name. The namesake natural spring is gone, and its location is unknown to the GNIS. The former spring had the name of Mathew J. Greene, a pioneer citizen. A post office called Greene Springs was established in 1887, and remained in operation until 1901.
