= Immanuel Episcopal Church (Winona, Mississippi) =

Historic church in Mississippi, United States

- U.S. National Register of Historic Places
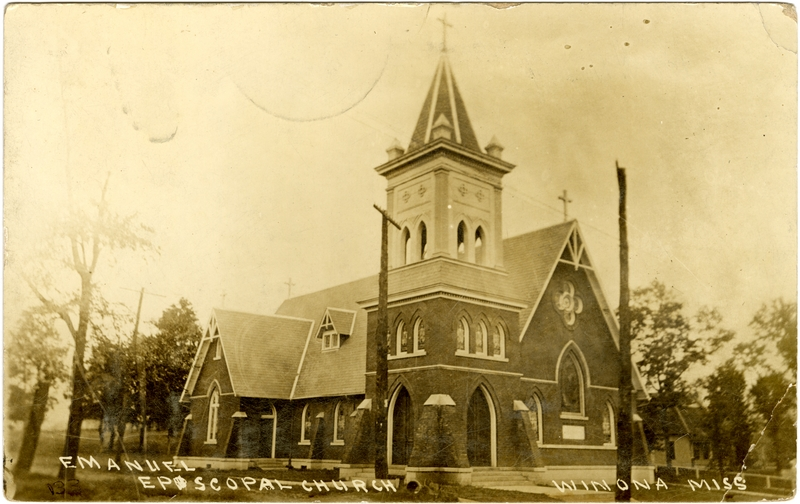

- Location within Mississippi Location within the United States
- Location: 416 Summit St., Winona, Mississippi
- Coordinates: 33°28′57″N 89°44′2″W
- Area: less than one acre
- Built: 1909
- Architectural style: Gothic
- NRHP reference No.: 05000740
- Added to NRHP: July 27, 2005

Immanuel Episcopal Church is a historic Episcopal church at 416 Summit Street in Winona, Mississippi.

It was built in 1909 and added to the National Register of Historic Places in 2005.
