= Doswell, Virginia =

Unincorporated community in Virginia, United States

Coordinates: 37°51′37″N 77°27′51″W

- Unincorporated area
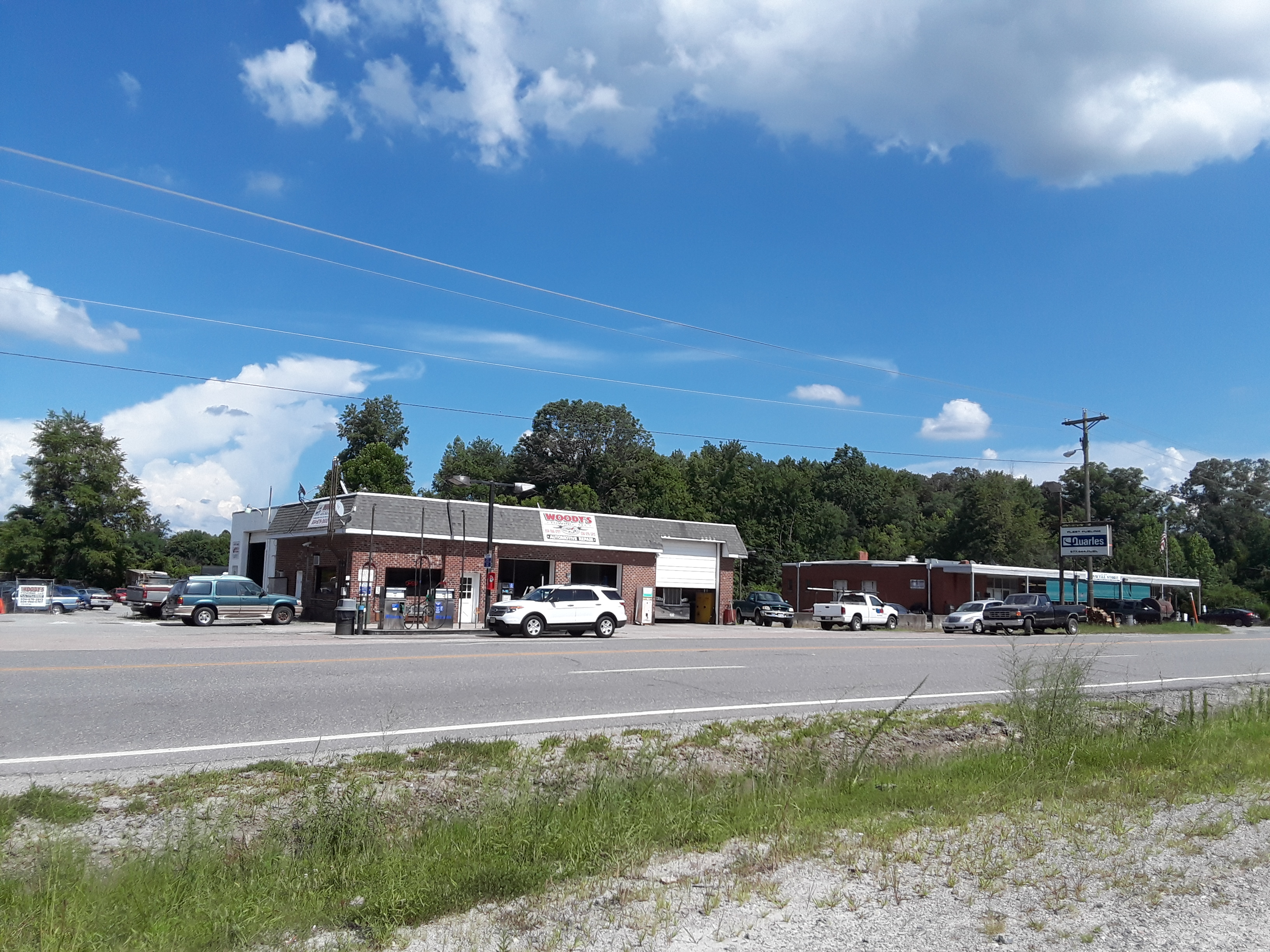
- Local businesses along US 1 in Doswell

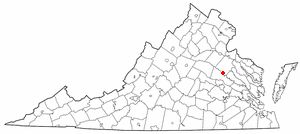
- Location of Doswell, Virginia Location in Hanover County in the Commonwealth of Virginia
- Country: United States
- State: Virginia
- County: Hanover
- Named for: Major Thomas Doswell

Population
  - Total: 1,833
- Time zone: UTC-5 (Eastern (EST))
  - Summer (DST): UTC-4 (EDT)
- ZIP codes: 23047
- Area code: 804

Doswell is an unincorporated community in Hanover County in the Central Region of the U.S. state of Virginia. It is considered a exurb of Richmond. Originally called Hanover Junction, it was located on the Virginia Central Railroad (later, part of the C&O) at a crossing of the Richmond, Fredericksburg and Potomac Railroad, a north–south route. Both railroads are now owned by CSX Transportation, although the former Virginia Central line is leased to a short-line carrier, Buckingham Branch Railroad. The area near the Doswell train station is a popular train-watching site for railfans.

== History ==
The name was changed to Doswell in the early 1890s in honor of Major Thomas Doswell (1823—90). The first Doswell in the area was James Doswell, a captain during the American Revolution.

Formerly consisting primarily of farmland, Doswell currently has many residents who commute to jobs in Richmond.

William Lee Taylor lived in Doswell while he was called to the pastorate in 1893 for the Jerusalem Baptist Church.

Doswellia kaltenbachi, an extinct species of heavily-armored archosauriform reptile from the Triassic Period, was discovered in 1974 during the construction of a sewage treatment plant in Doswell. In 1980, it was formally described and named after the community.

== Attractions ==
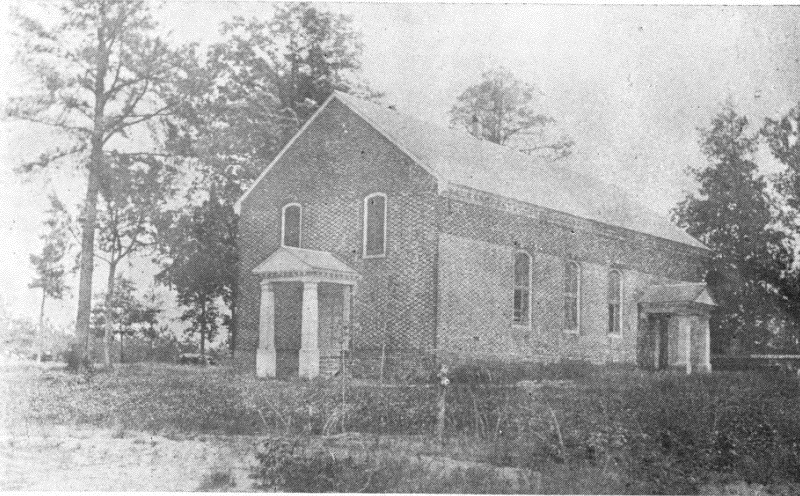
St. Martin's Church (Fork Church)

Kings Dominion, a major amusement park owned by Six Flags, and Meadow Event Park, home of the Virginia State Fair, are located in the vicinity of Doswell. There are also several historic sites in the area, such as Church Quarter and Sharp's Oakland which are listed on the National Register of Historic Places.

== Major roads ==
- I-95
- US 1
- SR 30
- SR 684 Verdon Road
- SR 688 Doswell Road

== Notable people ==
- Mittie Frances Clarke Point (1850–1937), dime novelist
- Secretariat (1970–1989), Triple Crown champion horse
- William Lee Taylor (1854–1915), African American Baptist minister, bank president, farmer
