= Cold Harbor National Cemetery =

Veterans cemetery in Hanover County, Virginia

- U.S. National Register of Historic Places
- Virginia Landmarks Register
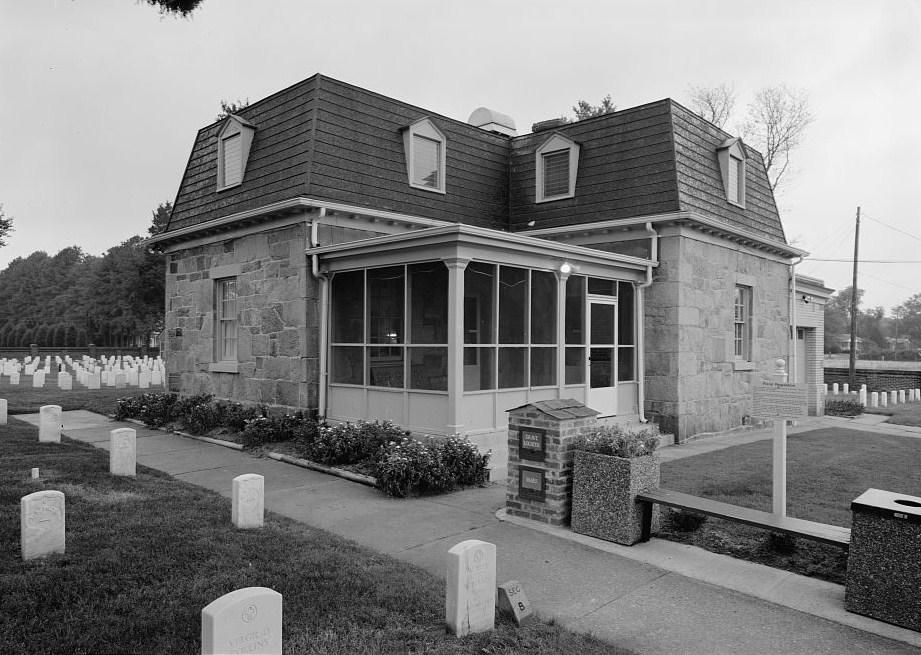
- The Lodge at Cold Harbor National Cemetery

- Location within Virginia Location within the United States
- Location: Jct. VA 156 and 619, .5 mi. E, Mechanicsville, Virginia
- Coordinates: 37°35′21″N 77°16′48″W
- Area: 1.4 acres (0.57 ha)
- Built: 1866
- Architect: Meigs, Montgomery C.
- Architectural style: Second Empire
- MPS: Civil War Era National Cemeteries MPS
- NRHP reference No.: 95000922
- VLR No.: 042-0136

Significant dates
- Added to NRHP: August 10, 1995
- Designated VLR: April 28, 1995

Cold Harbor National Cemetery is a United States National Cemetery in Mechanicsville, Hanover County, Virginia. It encompasses 1.4 acres (5,700 m^{2}), and as of the end of 2005, had 2,110 interments. Administered by the United States Department of Veterans Affairs, it is managed by the Hampton National Cemetery.

== History ==
Cold Harbor National Cemetery was established in 1866 on the site of the Battle of Cold Harbor, an American Civil War engagement. Interments were collected from a 22-mile (35 km) area, taken from the battlefields and field hospital sites of Cold Harbor, Mechanicsville (Beaver Dam Creek), Gaines's Mill, and Savage's Station. The land was appropriated in April 1865 during the first post-war search and re-burial operations conducted on local area battlefields, but not fully purchased until the cemetery was officially established the following year. Another search for buried and unburied remains occurred in 1867 and yielded over 1,000 full and partial skeletons that had been missed the previous year. Due to space limitations at Cold Harbor these remains, of which only a handful were identified, were re-interred in the larger Richmond National Cemetery.

In the book Magnolia Journey: A Union Veteran Revisits the Former Confederate States, Russell Conwell stated that in 1870 the remains of Union soldiers were still being unearthed from the battlefield by poverty-stricken local residents searching for Minie Balls to sell as lead scrap in nearby Richmond, Virginia. Although reported to cemetery superintendent Augustus Barry, who was mortally ill at the time, it does not appear that another search and reburial operation was made. Conwell feared that many soldiers' remains may have ended up in Richmond's fertilizer factories mixed in with the bones of dead artillery horses. Remains in the Cold Harbor area have been occasionally discovered by farmers and construction crews well into the 21st century.

Room for the burial of American veterans of later periods was made when the original design of the cemetery was altered by removing several paths and walkways that bisected the cemetery. The cemetery is now closed to further interments.

== Notoriety ==
Cold Harbor National Cemetery was listed on the National Register of Historic Places in 1995.

== Notable monuments ==
- Monument to the Unknowns, a 5-foot-high (1.5 m) marble sarcophagus erected by the federal government in 1877 to commemorate the 889 unknown Union soldiers buried in two trench graves at the back of the cemetery.
- The Pennsylvania Monument, a 30-foot-tall (9.1 m) granite spire with a statue of a soldier at the top, was erected in 1909 by the commonwealth of Pennsylvania, and dedicated to its regiments lost at Cold Harbor.
- The 8th New York Heavy Artillery Monument, a granite block with a bronze plaque listing the names of those from the detachment who died at Cold Harbor, erected in 1909 by the state of New York.

== Notable interments ==
- Sergeant Major Augustus Barry, Medal of Honor recipient for action in the Civil War. Sergeant Major Barry was also the first superintendent of Cold Harbor National Cemetery.
