= Springfield (Coatesville, Virginia) =

Historic house in Virginia, United States

- U.S. National Register of Historic Places
- Virginia Landmarks Register
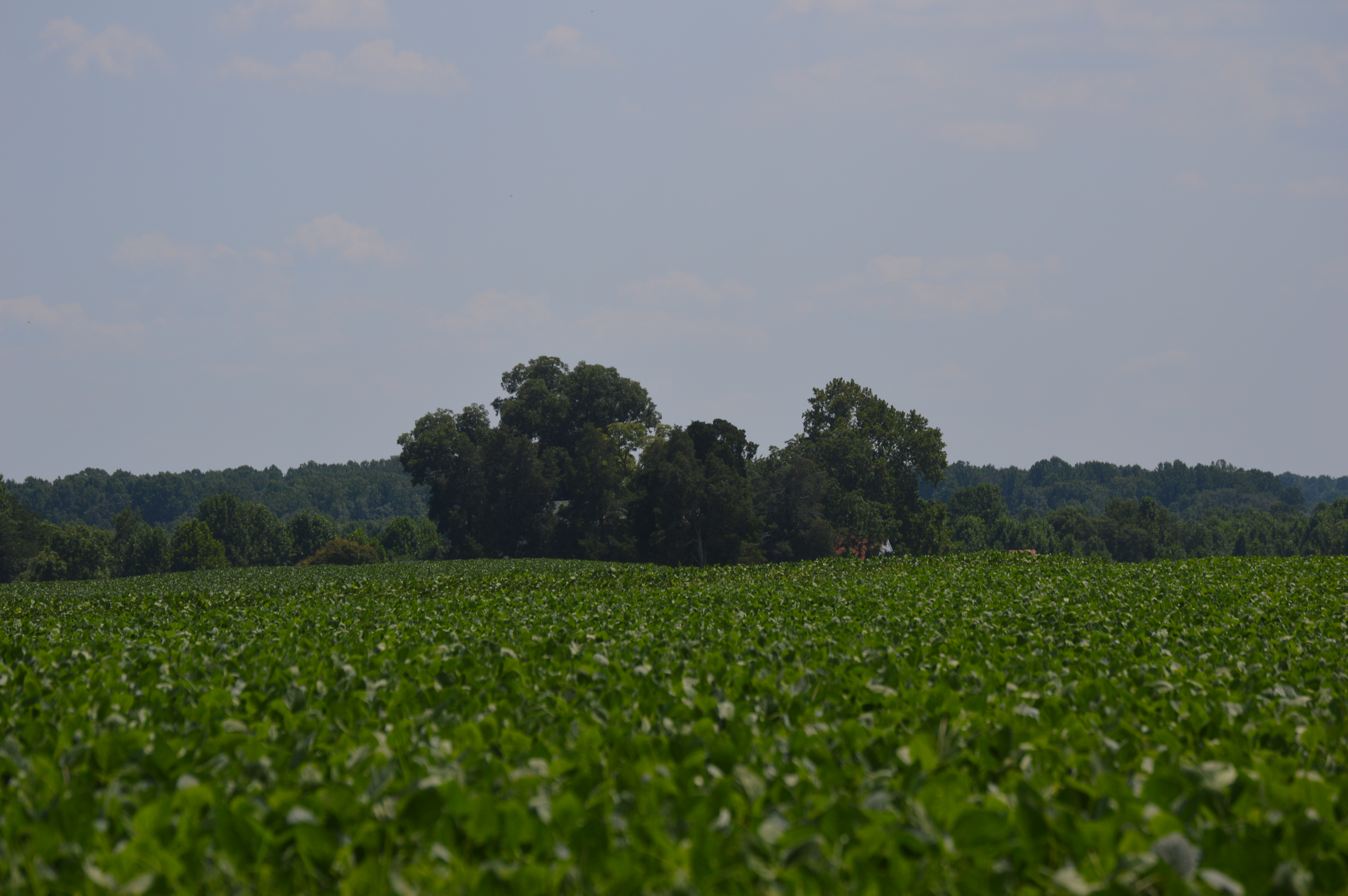
- Distant view from the north

- Location within Virginia Location within the United States
- Location: VA 631 S side, 0.4 mi. SW of jct. with VA 671, Coatesville, Virginia
- Coordinates: 37°51′57″N 77°36′48″W
- Area: 25 acres (10 ha)
- Built: c. 1820
- Architectural style: Federal
- NRHP reference No.: 94000990
- VLR No.: 042-0428

Significant dates
- Added to NRHP: August 16, 1994
- Designated VLR: June 14, 1994

Springfield is a historic home located at Coatesville, Hanover County, Virginia. It was built about 1820, and is a two-story, Federal-style brick residence with a central passage-single pile plan. It measures 48 feet by 20 feet, and is situated on an English basement with two interior end chimneys, a gable roof, and a frame gable-roofed porch. Also on the property are contributing kitchen and meat house.

It was listed on the National Register of Historic Places in 1994.
