= Oakley Hill =

Historic house in Virginia, United States

- U.S. National Register of Historic Places
- Virginia Landmarks Register
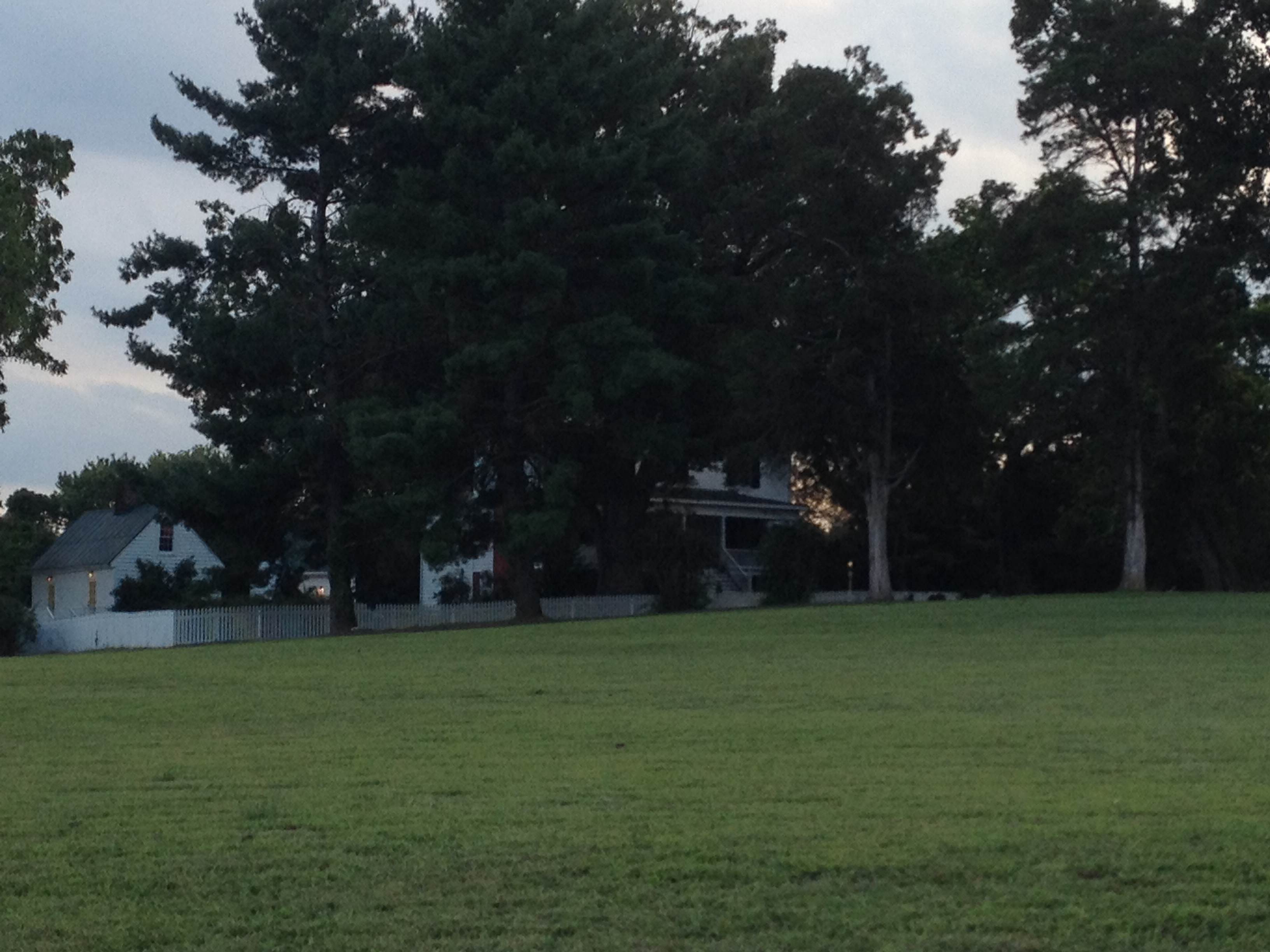

- Location within Virginia Location within the United States
- Location: VA 156 S side, 2500 ft. W of jct. with VA 643, near Mechanicsville, Virginia
- Coordinates: 37°35′43″N 77°20′24″W
- Area: 100 acres (40 ha)
- Built: 1839
- Architectural style: Greek Revival
- NRHP reference No.: 94000459
- VLR No.: 042-0137

Significant dates
- Added to NRHP: May 19, 1994
- Designated VLR: March 10, 1994

Oakley Hill is a historic plantation house located near Mechanicsville, Hanover County, Virginia. It was built about 1839 and expanded in the 1850s. It is a two-story, frame I-house dwelling in the Greek Revival style. On the rear of the house is a 1910 one-story ell. The house sits on a brick foundation, has a standing seam metal low gable roof, and interior end chimneys. The front facade features a one-story front porch with four Tuscan order columns and a Tuscan entablature. Also on the property are a contributing smokehouse and servants' house.

It was listed on the National Register of Historic Places in 1995.
