= Clover Lea =

Historic house in Virginia, United States

- U.S. National Register of Historic Places
- Virginia Landmarks Register
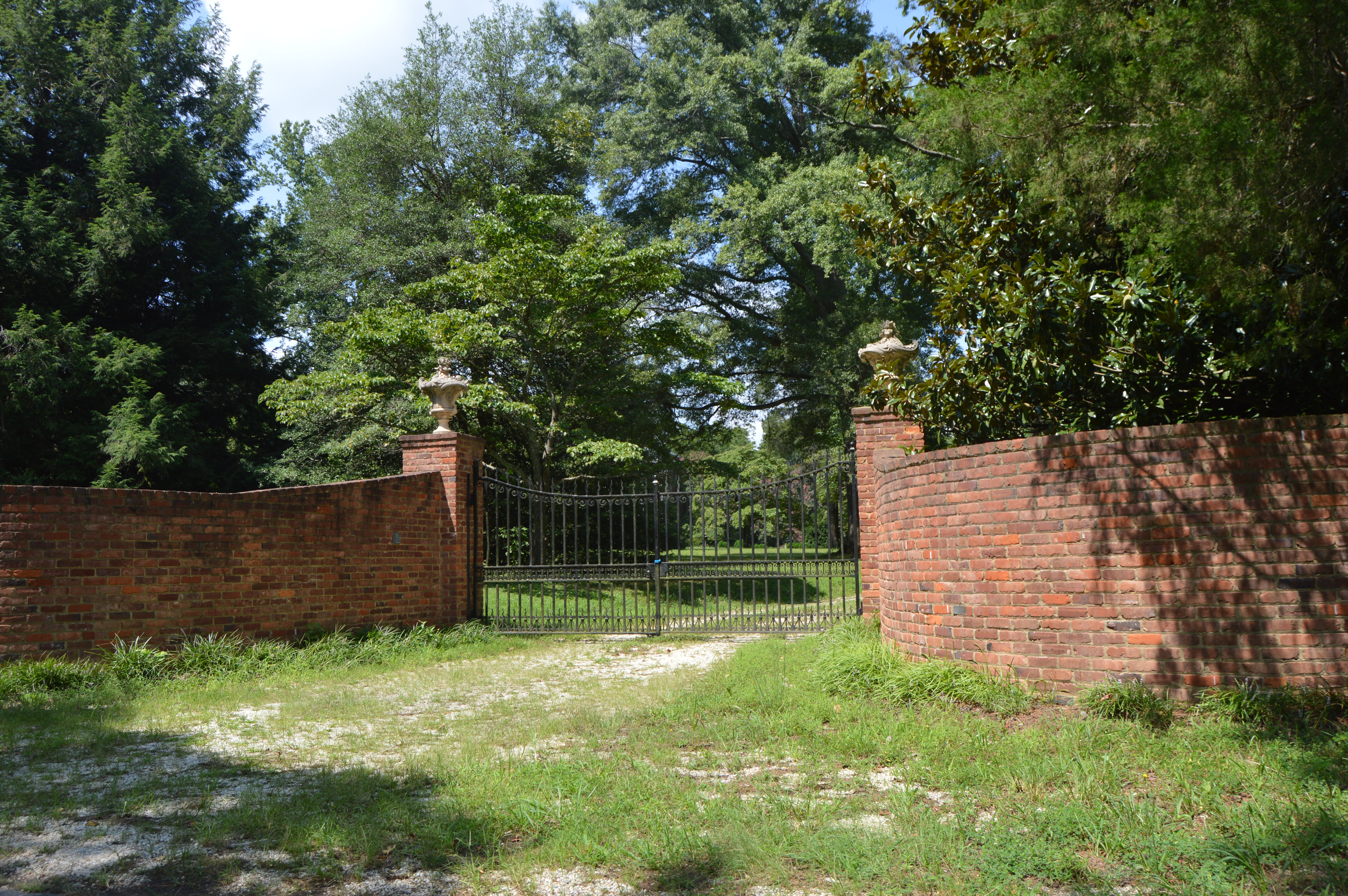
- Property entrance

- Location within Virginia Location within the United States
- Location: E of Mechanicsville off VA 629, near Mechanicsville, Virginia
- Coordinates: 37°38′36″N 77°11′07″W
- Area: 18 acres (7.3 ha)
- Built: 1845-1846
- Architectural style: Greek Revival
- NRHP reference No.: 79003045
- VLR No.: 042-0047

Significant dates
- Added to NRHP: February 28, 1979
- Designated VLR: October 17, 1978

Clover Lea is a historic home located near Mechanicsville, Hanover County, Virginia. It was built in 1845–1846, and is a two-story, three-bay, side-hall-plan brick dwelling in the Greek Revival style. The house features a two-story, Tuscan order-inspired portico which consists of six massive square wooden columns supported by brick piers. Also on the property is a contributing small carriage barn.

It was listed on the National Register of Historic Places in 1979.
