= Spring Green (Mechanicsville, Virginia) =

Historic house in Virginia, United States

- U.S. National Register of Historic Places
- Virginia Landmarks Register
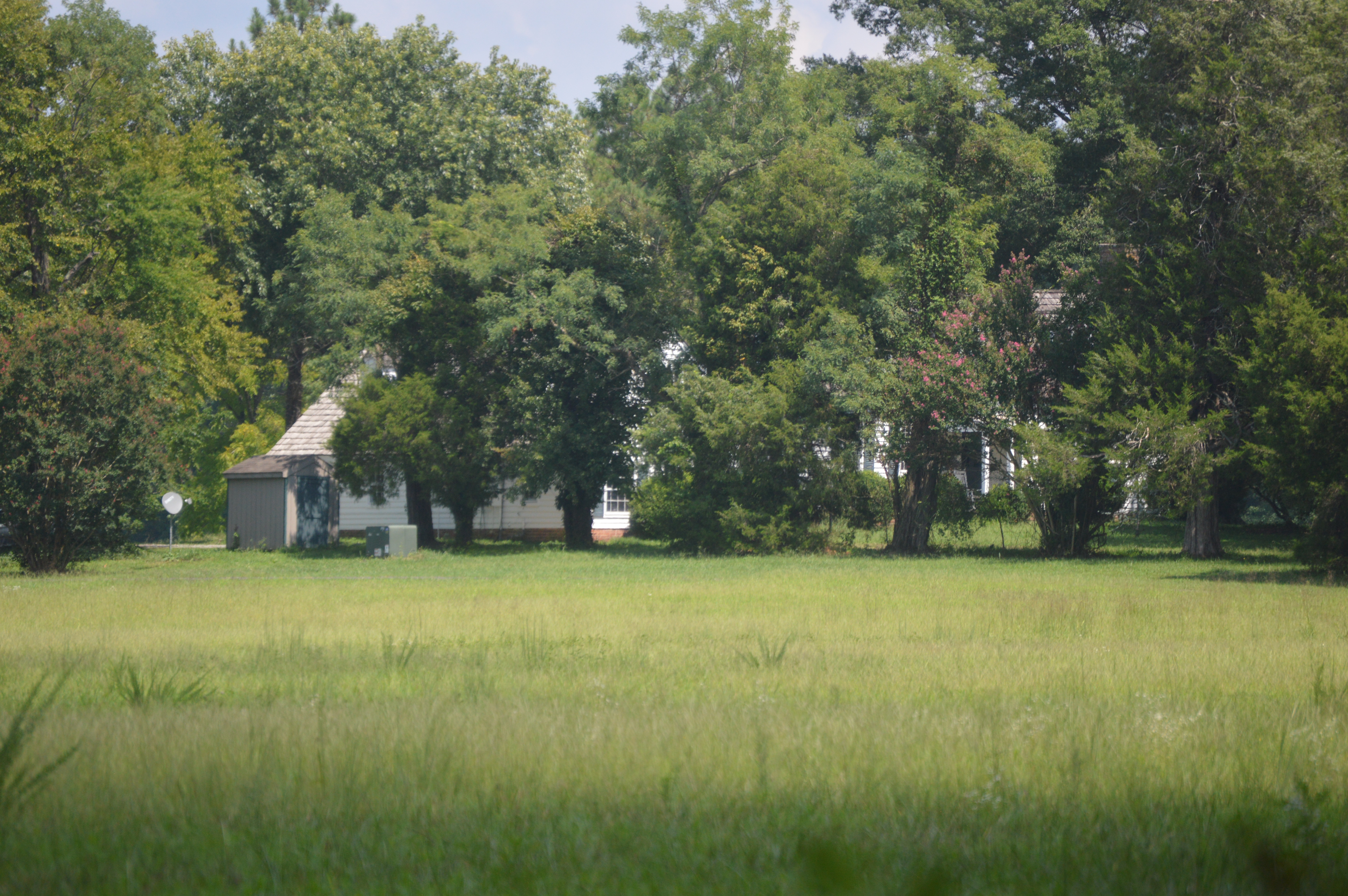
- Roadside view

- Location within Virginia Location within the United States
- Location: 2160 Old Church Rd., Mechanicsville, Virginia
- Coordinates: 37°37′49″N 77°10′21″W
- Area: 7 acres (2.8 ha)
- Built: c. 1764, c. 1800
- Architectural style: Federal
- NRHP reference No.: 02000316
- VLR No.: 042-0031

Significant dates
- Added to NRHP: December 31, 2002
- Designated VLR: September 12, 2001

Spring Green is an historic home located near Mechanicsville, Hanover County, Virginia. It was built about 1800 and encompasses an earlier dwelling dated to about 1764. It is a 1 1/2-story, five-bay, center hall, single pile frame dwelling in the Federal style. The oldest section includes the hall, east parlor with the old kitchen. The house sits on a brick foundation, has a gable roof with dormers, and exterior end chimneys. Also on the property is a contributing smokehouse.

It was listed on the National Register of Historic Places in 2002.
