= Trinity Church (Beaverdam, Virginia) =

Historic church in Virginia, US

- U.S. National Register of Historic Places
- Virginia Landmarks Register
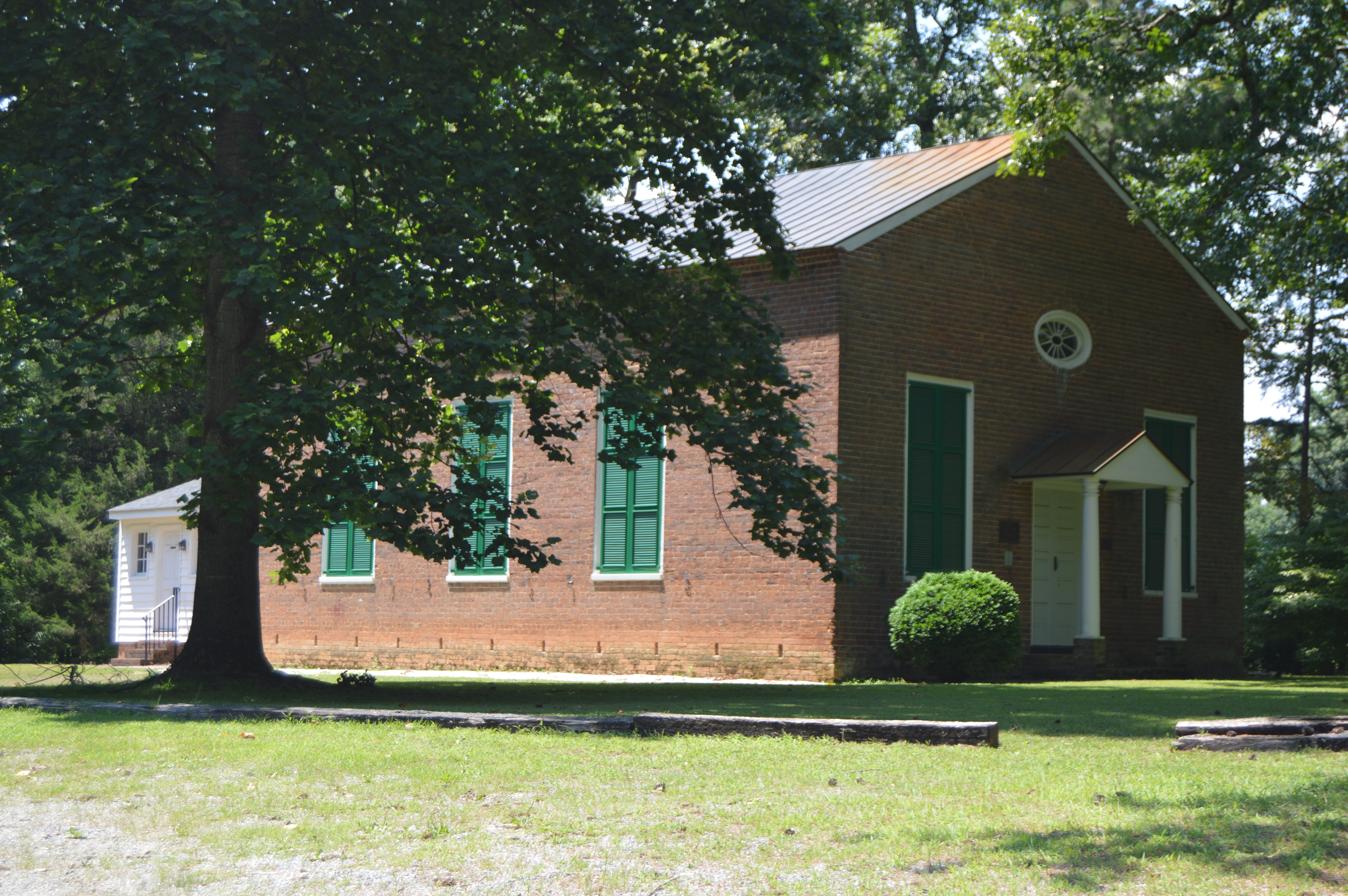
- Front and eastern side

- Location within Virginia Location within the United States
- Location: Jct. of VA 738 and VA 658, Beaverdam, Virginia
- Coordinates: 37°54′3″N 77°38′37″W
- Area: 2.4 acres (0.97 ha)
- Built: 1830
- Built by: Green, Milton & William
- Architectural style: Early Republic, Early Classical Revival
- NRHP reference No.: 90001923
- VLR No.: 042-0038

Significant dates
- Added to NRHP: December 27, 1990
- Designated VLR: February 20, 1990

Trinity Church is a historic Episcopal church located at Beaverdam, Hanover County, Virginia. It was built in 1830, and is a one-story, gable roofed brick building in an Early Classical Revival style. The front facade features a small pedimented porch supported on turned wood columns.

It was listed on the National Register of Historic Places in 1990.
