= Laurel Meadow (Mechanicsville, Virginia) =

Historic house in Virginia, United States

- U.S. National Register of Historic Places
- Virginia Landmarks Register
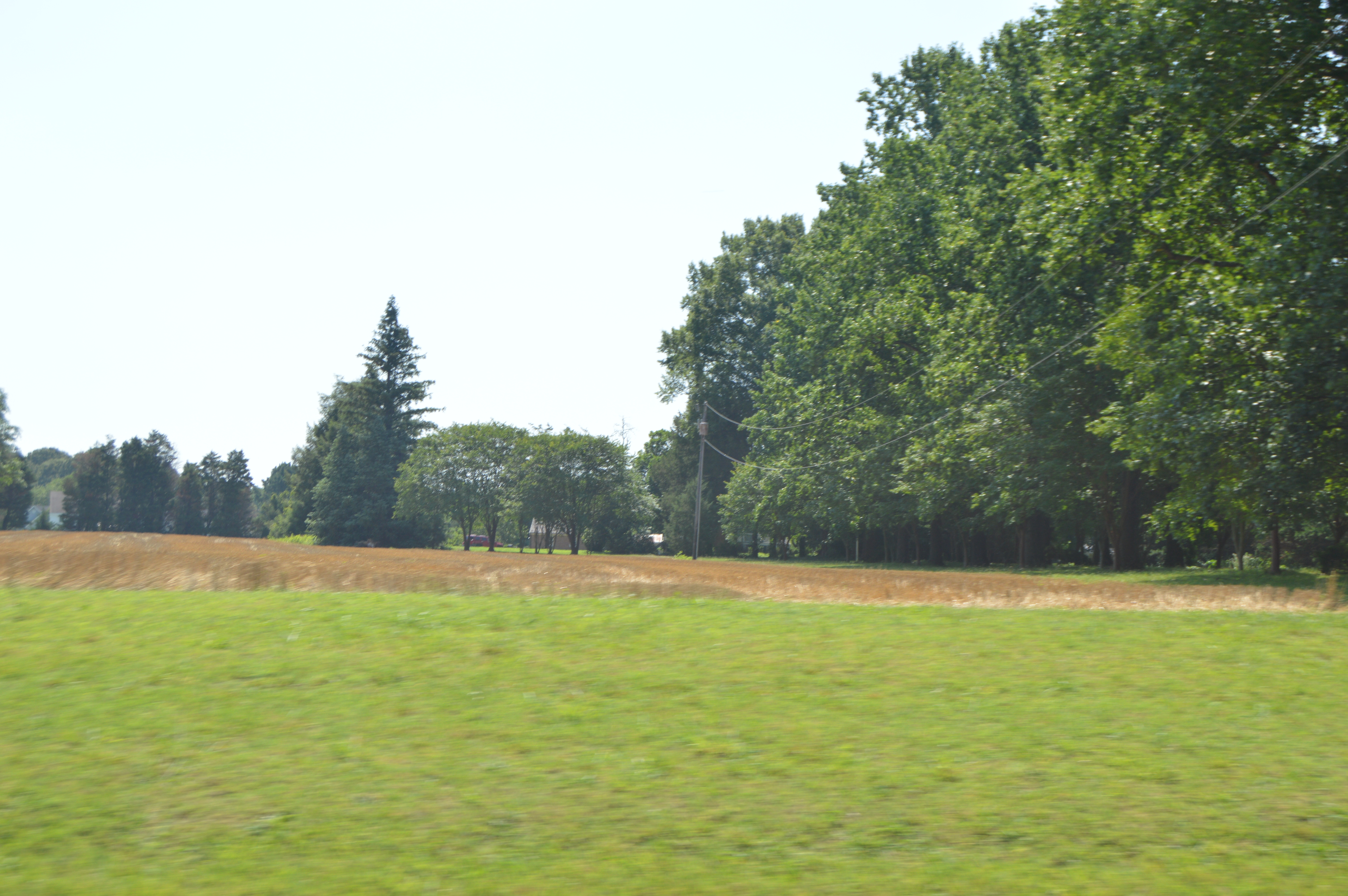
- Fields on the property

- Location within Virginia Location within the United States
- Location: VA 643 E side, 0.2 mi. S of jct. with VA 627, near Mechanicsville, Virginia
- Coordinates: 37°38′00″N 77°20′14″W
- Area: 10 acres (4.0 ha)
- Built: c. 1820
- Architectural style: Federal
- NRHP reference No.: 95000827
- VLR No.: 042-0244

Significant dates
- Added to NRHP: July 7, 1995
- Designated VLR: April 28, 1995

Laurel Meadow is a historic home located near Mechanicsville, Hanover County, Virginia. It was built about 1820, and is a 1 1/2-story, hall-parlor-plan house in the Federal style. The house sits on a brick foundation, has a gable roof with dormers, and exterior end chimneys. Also on the property are a contributing one-room schoolhouse and a barn.

It was listed on the National Register of Historic Places in 1995.
