= Mechanicsville, Virginia =

- Census-designated place
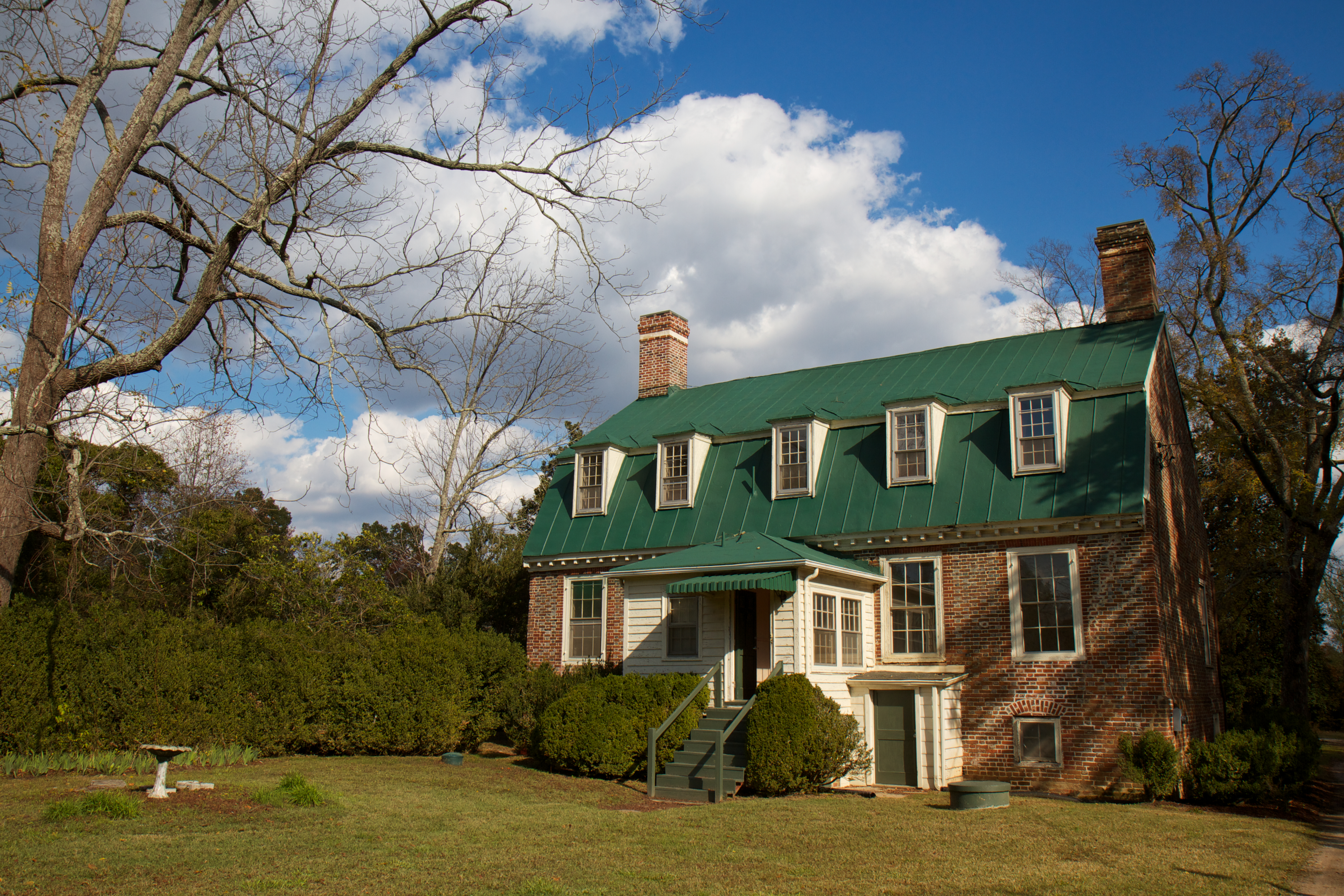
- Rural Plains

- Location in Hanover County and the state of Virginia
- Coordinates: 37°36′14″N 77°22′20″W
- Country: United States
- State: Virginia
- County: Hanover

Area
  - Total: 28.4 sq mi (73.6 km^{2})
  - Land: 28.3 sq mi (73.3 km^{2})
  - Water: 0.12 sq mi (0.3 km^{2})
- Elevation: 180 ft (55 m)

Population (2020)
  - Total: 39,482
  - Density: 1,393.4/sq mi (538.0/km^{2})
- Time zone: UTC-5 (Eastern (EST))
  - Summer (DST): UTC-4 (EDT)
- ZIP Codes: 23111, 23116
- Area code: 804
- FIPS code: 51-50856
- GNIS feature ID: 2389467

Mechanicsville is an unincorporated community and census-designated place (CDP) in Hanover County, Virginia, United States. The population was 39,482 during the 2020 census, up from 36,348 in the 2010 census.

== History ==
The area was settled by English colonists starting in the 17th century. Rural Plains, also known as Shelton House, is a structure built in 1670 and lived in by male Sheltons until 2006. Located in the northern part of the Mechanicsville CDP, it is now owned and operated by the National Park Service as one of the sites of the Richmond National Battlefield Park.

In addition to Rural Plains, Clover Lea, Cold Harbor National Cemetery, Cool Well, Hanover Meeting House, Hanover Town, Immanuel Episcopal Church, Laurel Meadow, Oak Forest, Oakley Hill, Selwyn, and Spring Green are listed on the National Register of Historic Places.

=== Antebellum period ===
The Mechanicsville Turnpike Company was established by an Act of the Virginia General Assembly in 1816, and was authorized to sell stock and establish tolls to finance the new road. The road was to be located "from the city of Richmond, crossing the Chickahominy river between the meadow and new bridges, until it intersects the swamp road on the north side of the said river." The turnpike was created in response to the petition of local citizens, so the name Mechanicsville may have already been in use at that time. The first mention of the name Mechanicsville in the Richmond Enquirer was in 1817, advertising the Mechanicsville Turnpike Company's effort to build a new road from Downtown Richmond.

The community is not identified in John Wood's 1820 map of Hanover County though it does show the locations of the Polegreen Church, Topotomoy Creek, and Beaverdam Creek. According to local sources, the name "Mechanicsville" came from a wheelwright and blacksmith shop at a crossroads on the Hanover end of the Turnpike road, one of a dozen or so buildings there before the Civil War.

=== American Civil War ===
By the Civil War, Mechanicsville was an established named community. Mechanicsville, and the surrounding area, was the site of numerous battles during the American Civil War. The first was the Battle of Beaver Dam Creek, which began on June 26, 1862. Confederate General A.P. Hill launched a series of assaults against Union Major General Fitz John Porter's army positioned along Beaver Dam Creek, just east of Mechanicsville. Union forces repulsed the Confederate attacks and afterward withdrew to a new position along Boatswain Creek near Gaines' Mill. The Beaver Dam Creek engagement was the second in the series of Civil War battles known as the Seven Days Battles. A small portion of the battlefield in the southeast part of the CDP has been preserved as part of the Richmond National Battlefield Park, a park area administered by the National Park Service.

The Battle of Gaines' Mill was the third of the Seven Days Battles, occurring farther east of Mechanicsville. A portion of the battlefield has been preserved at the Watt House as part of the Richmond National Battlefield Park.

Near Gaines' Mill was the Battle of Cold Harbor, the final major battle of Union Lt. Gen. Ulysses S. Grant's 1864 Overland Campaign. This was fought over the same ground as the Battle of Gaines' Mill. The area identified as part of the battlefield for Second Cold Harbor stretches from near the intersection of Walnut Grove Road and Mechanicsville Turnpike to Turkey Hill near the state Route 156 crossing of the Chickahominy River. An area of the battlefield that saw heavy casualties and a nearby postwar national cemetery are preserved as historic monuments.

=== Postbellum period ===
The growth of Mechanicsville from a rural community into a suburb of Richmond begin after World War II and continued throughout the second half of the twentieth century.

In downtown Mechanicsville stands a stone windmill, now a landmark in the area. The building was constructed as a Heritage Bank branch office in the 1970s. In 2007–2008, it was restored and enlarged by a new bank occupancy. The "windmill" is decorative and driven by an electric motor.

== Geography ==
Mechanicsville comprises the western portion of Hanover County's southern extension, north of the Chickahominy River. The southern border of the CDP, which follows the Chickahominy, is the Henrico County line, and at its closest point, Mechanicsville is less than two miles from the city limits of Richmond. U.S. Route 360 passes through the CDP, leading southwest 6 miles (10 km) to the center of Richmond and northeast 40 miles (64 km) to Tappahannock. Interstate 295, an eastern bypass of Richmond, crosses Mechanicsville from northwest to southeast, with access from exits 41, 38, 37, and 34. U.S. Route 301 forms the northwestern border of the CDP, leading south 9 miles (14 km) to the center of Richmond and north 29 miles (47 km) to Bowling Green.

The original rural hamlet of Mechanicsville is in the southwest part of the CDP along US 360, just southwest of I-295 Exit 37. The CDP also includes the neighborhoods or named places of Pearsons Corner, Oak Forest, Kings Charter, Rural Point, Borkeys Store, Burnside Farms, Mayfield Farms, Carneals Store, Pole Green, Newman, Dogwood Knoll, Spring Meadows, Brandy Creek Estates, Windy Hill Estates, Ellerson Mill, and Simpkins Corner.

According to the U.S. Census Bureau, the Mechanicsville CDP has a total area of 28.4 square miles (73.6 km^{2}), of which 28.3 square miles (73.3 km^{2}) are land and 0.1 square miles (0.3 km^{2}), or 0.42%, are water. The southern part of the CDP is drained by the Chickahominy River and its tributaries, flowing to the James River, while the northern part is drained by tributaries of the Pamunkey River, part of the York River watershed.

== Demographics ==
Historical population
Census	Pop.	Note	%±
1970	5,189		—
1980	9,269		78.6%
1990	22,027		137.6%
2000	30,464		38.3%
2010	36,348		19.3%
2020	39,482		8.6%

=== 2020 census ===
As of the 2020 census, Mechanicsville had a population of 39,482. The population density was 1,393.4 people per square mile (414.5/km^{2}). The median age was 42.4 years. 22.4% of residents were under the age of 18 and 19.9% of residents were 65 years of age or older. For every 100 females there were 90.7 males, and for every 100 females age 18 and over there were 85.9 males age 18 and over.

98.6% of residents lived in urban areas, while 1.4% lived in rural areas.

There were 15,418 households in Mechanicsville, of which 32.4% had children under the age of 18 living in them. Of all households, 52.6% were married-couple households, 13.7% were households with a male householder and no spouse or partner present, and 28.0% were households with a female householder and no spouse or partner present. About 24.6% of all households were made up of individuals and 13.0% had someone living alone who was 65 years of age or older.

There were 15,924 housing units, of which 3.2% were vacant. The homeowner vacancy rate was 0.9% and the rental vacancy rate was 3.4%.

Racial composition as of the 2020 census
Race	Number	Percent
White	31,960	80.9%
Black or African American	3,516	8.9%
American Indian and Alaska Native	162	0.4%
Asian	859	2.2%
Native Hawaiian and Other Pacific Islander	22	0.1%
Some other race	610	1.5%
Two or more races	2,353	6.0%
Hispanic or Latino (of any race)	1,420	3.6%

== Notable people ==
- Willie Adler, guitarist for Lamb of God
- Lucy Dacus, singer/songwriter
- Joe Douglas, NFL general manager
- Wes Freed, artist and musician
- Kevin Grubb, racing driver
- Wayne Grubb, racing driver
- Jock Jones, NFL linebacker
- Tim Menzies, singer/songwriter
- Jason Mraz, singer/songwriter
- Connor Overton, MLB pitcher
- Billy Parker, Arena Football League defensive specialist for the New York Dragons
- Will Pulisic, soccer player
- Mary Ann Redmond, singer/songwriter
- Sam Rogers, NFL fullback
- Zuriel Smith, former New England Patriots wide receiver
- Matt Taylor, bassist in the band Motion City Soundtrack
- Tony Thaxton, drummer in the band Motion City Soundtrack
- Stacy Tutt, NFL fullback
- Tyler Warren, NFL tight end
