= Sarah Henry =

Sarah Henry may refer to:

- Tuhbenahneequay (c. 1780–1873), Mississauga woman, baptized as Sarah Henry
- Sarah Shelton Henry (1738–1775), first wife of Founding Father Patrick Henry
- Sarah Winston Syme Henry (c. 1710–1784, mother of Patrick Henry
- Sarah Savage (1664–1752), née Henry, English diarist.
