= Mount Brilliant =

18th-century plantation in Hanover County, Virginia

Coordinates: 37.744°N 77.623°W

Mount Brilliant was an 18th-century plantation located west of Stone Horse Creek in northern Hanover County, Virginia, United States. The house was a story-and-a-half frame structure with dormer windows, built in the English tradition. It stood on one of the highest points in Hanover County, with pine and oak forests nearby. About a quarter of a mile from the main house stands a building that is likely enslaved people's quarters. The residence has been torn down and the land is now a cultivated field.

== History ==
Mount Brilliant was first owned by John Henry, the father of Patrick Henry and William Henry, both of whom resided at Mount Brilliant. After many years of ownership, the Henry family began referring to the property as "The Retreat." John Henry is believed to have been buried at the cemetery there.

It was owned by Robert Carter Nicholas Sr. (1728—1780) until his death, then his wife Anne Cary Nicholas and their children occupied Mount Brilliant. Nicholas was buried at the small cemetery there. During the Yorktown Campaign of the Revolutionary War, it was the headquarters of General Charles Earl Cornwallis and his officers in early June 1781. Troops destroyed or took provisions from the plantation, including hay, livestock, orchards, fences, and the barn. They also took other valuable items. Provisions were consumed by the soldiers and runaway slaves who had joined the army.

On 17 April 1985, the cemetery on the old Mount Brilliant property was marked with a historical marker due to the gravesite of John Henry.
