= Philip Henry =

English Nonconformist clergyman and diarist

The Reverend Philip Henry
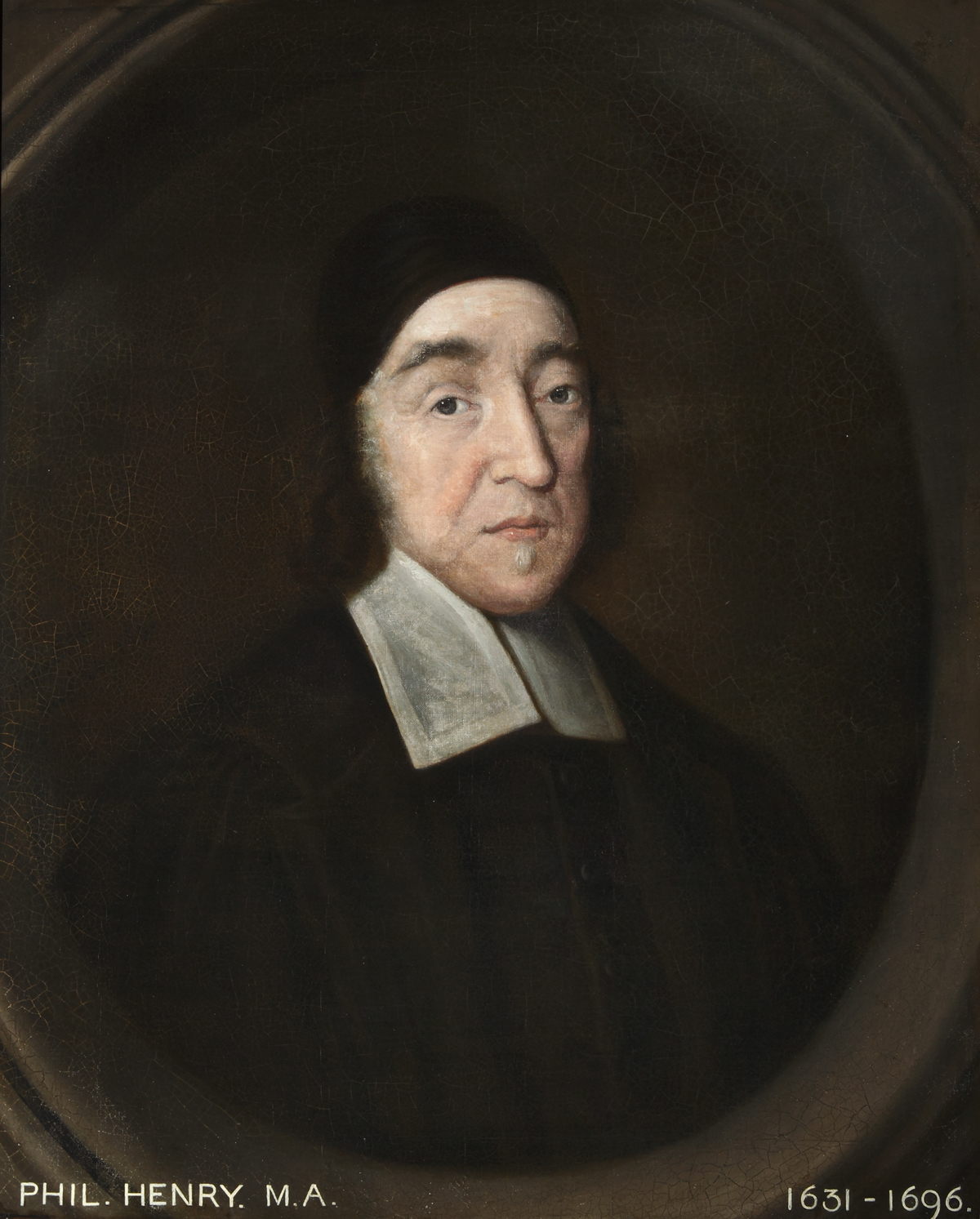
- Born: 24 August 1631
- Died: 24 June 1696 (aged 64)
- Education: Westminster School
- Spouse: Kathrine Mathews (26 April 1660-1696)
- Children: 6
- Parent(s): John Henry, Magdalen Rochdale

Philip Henry (24 August 1631 – 24 June 1696) was an English Nonconformist clergyman and diarist. His son Matthew Henry was a notable commentator on the Bible and also a Presbyterian minister.

== Early life ==
Philip Henry was born at Whitehall, London on 24 August 1631 and named after Philip Herbert, 4th Earl of Pembroke, in whose service his father had been. Philip Henry was the eldest son of John Henry, keeper of the orchard at Whitehall Palace. His father's work as a courtier provided a stable income for the family. His mother was Magdalen Rochdale.

As a child he was playmate to the princes Charles II and James II, and kept to his dying day a book given him by the latter. Archbishop William Laud took notice of him for his readiness in opening the watergate when Laud came late from the council to cross by boat to Lambeth. His father took Philip Henry to see Laud while the latter was later imprisoned in the Tower of London.

He first attended Latin school at St. Martin's Church and then transferred to Battersey. In 1643 at age 12, he was admitted to Westminster School and became a King's Scholar in October 1645. While at Westminster school, he learned Greek and Latin and was known to quote from classic authors in conversations. He was a favourite pupil of Richard Busby. During the outset of the English Civil War, a series of morning lectures were given by members of the clergy at Westminster Abbey. His mother, a Puritan, obtained leave for him to attend the early lectures. Henry credits Richard Busby's diligence in preparing him for holy communion. He ascribes his adoption of a religious life in April 1647 after hearing Stephen Marshal at St. Martin's.

In May 1647 Henry was elected to a studentship at Christ Church, Oxford, and went into residence on 15 December. He was admitted student on 24 March 1648, just before the parliamentary visitation, which removed Underwood, his tutor, substituting William Finmore (afterwards archdeacon of Chester). He graduated B.A. in 1650/1 and M.A. on 10 December 1652.

While at home on leave in January 1649 he saw Charles I going by water from Whitehall to Westminster daily to his trial, once speaking to his father. Of Charles's execution he gave an eye-witness account, including "[I] can truly say with a sad heart...there was such a Grone by the Thousands then present, as I never heard before & desire I may never hear again." His father's death left the family in financial difficulties.

== Family ==
He married Katharine Mathews (25 March 1629 – 25 May 1707) on 26 April 1660, at Whitewell Chapel. Katharine was the only child of Daniel Matthews of Bronington and Broad Oak, Flintshire. The couple had six children: John Henry (3 May 1661 – 12 April 1667), Matthew Henry, Sarah Henry, Katharine, Eleanor, and Ann Henry (1667). The eldest daughter, Sarah, wife of John Savage, kept a diary which was later published.

== Preacher ==
Henry preached his first sermon at South Hinksey, Oxfordshire, on 9 January 1653. On the introduction of Francis Palmer, afterwards professor of moral philosophy at Oxford, he was engaged in September 1653 by John Puleston, justice of the common pleas, as tutor to his sons at Emeral, Flintshire, and preacher at Worthenbury Chapel, in the parish of Bangor-on-Dee, same county. In 1654 he was with his pupils at Oxford; from 1655 he was constantly at Worthenbury, where Judge Puleston built him "a very handsome house, and settled it upon him by a lease... for threescore years, if he should so long continue minister at Worthenbury."

The rector of Bangor had been Henry Bridgeman, but the living had been sequestered in 1646. Robert Fogg, the parliamentary incumbent, initially objected to Henry's ordination as minister of Worthenbury, but afterwards withdrew it on Henry's saying he desired Fogg's consent. Accordingly, having undergone an examination by the fourth Shropshire classis (constituted by parliament, April 1647), he was ordained with five others at Prees, Shropshire, on 16 September 1657. He made a strongly Calvinistic confession, but said nothing about church government. His ideal was a modified episcopacy on James Ussher's system. In 1658 a commission of ecclesiastical promotions took Worthenbury Chapel out of Bangor parish, making it with Worthenbury Church (a donative) a new parish, of which Henry was incumbent.

He declined the vicarage of Wrexham, Denbighshire, in March 1659, and shortly afterwards a living near London. Mrs. Puleston died in 1658, and the judge on 5 September 1659. Roger Puleston, their eldest son, had no love for his tutor; they had even come to blows (16 September 1656). He appears to have sympathized with the royalist rising under Sir George Booth in August 1659, and welcomed the restoration of Charles II in 1660.

== After the Restoration ==
At the Restoration, which Henry, then newly married, welcomed, Bridgeman resumed the rectory of Bangor, and Henry's position was simply that of his curate at Worthenbury Chapel. In September 1660 he was presented at Flint assizes with Fogg and Richard Steel for not reading the common prayer, and again at the spring assizes, without effect. He had taken the oath of allegiance, but refusing reordination he was incapable of preferment. On 24 October 1661 Bridgeman, having failed to arrange matters, came to Worthenbury and read Henry's discharge before a crowd. Henry showed some feeling, but was allowed to preach farewell sermons on 27 October. The Act of Uniformity 1662, which took effect on 24 August 1662, silenced him. He surrendered his house and annuity for £100, to avoid litigation, and left Worthenbury for Broad Oak, Flintshire, a property settled upon his wife.

He consulted John Fell, then dean of Christ Church, Oxford, about his difficulties. His main objection was re-ordination, which he reckoned simony. On 10 October 1663 he was apprehended with thirteen others and imprisoned for four days at Hanmer, Flintshire, on suspicion of an insurrectionary plot. On 15 March 1665 he was cited to Malpas, Cheshire, for baptising one of his own children; at the end of the month he was treated as a layman, and was made sub-collector of tax for the township of Iscoyd. The Five Mile Act 1665 placed him in a difficulty, Broad Oak being four reputed miles from Worthenbury; on actual measurement it was found to be sixty yards over the five miles. However, he removed for a season to Whitchurch, Shropshire. All this time he was a regular attendant at parish churches, his habit being to stand throughout the service; he forbore communicating simply on the ground of the kneeling posture.

In February 1668 he preached by request in the parish church of Betley, Staffordshire, a circumstance of which accounts were reported in the House of Commons. Not till the short-lived indulgence of 1672 did he resume his public ministry in his licensed house, still avoiding encroachment on church hours. On the withdrawal of the indulgence, he continued to preach without molestation till 1681, when he was fined for keeping conventicles. In 1682 he had a public discussion with Quakers at Llanfyllin, Montgomeryshire, and was drawn into a debate on ordination at Oswestry Town Hall in Oswestry, Shropshire, with William Lloyd, at that time bishop of St. Asaph, and Henry Dodwell the elder.

== Last years ==
At the time of Monmouth's rebellion he was confined in Chester Castle for three weeks (July 1685) under a general order from the lord-lieutenant. He joined in a cautiously worded address (September 1687) to James II. In May 1688 he was placed on the commission of the peace for Flintshire, but declined to qualify. At the revolution he had great hopes of 'comprehension.' The terms of the Toleration Act he accepted with some reservations. He ministered at Broad Oak in an outbuilding near his house.

His last years were spent in pastoral work. He died at Broad Oak of a sudden attack of colic and stone, on 24 June 1696, aged sixty-four, and was buried on 27 June in Whitchurch Church. Funeral sermons were preached at Broad Oak by Francis Tallents of Shrewsbury, James Owen of Oswestry, and Matthew Henry. A marble tablet was erected to his memory in St. Alkmund's, Whitchurch, bearing a Latin inscription by John Tylston, M.D., his son-in-law. In 1712, when the church was rebuilt, his body was removed to the churchyard, and the monument to the porch. In 1844 a tablet bearing an English version of the epitaph was placed in the north aisle of the church, the original monument being transferred to Whitewell Chapel, near Broad Oak. In 1996 there was a commemoration of his life and ministry at St. Alkmund's to mark the tercentenary of his death.

== Works ==
- Diaries and Letters of Philip Henry (1882)

== See also ==
- York House, Strand
- Nonconformist
- Matthew Henry
- Sarah Savage
