= Matthew Henry =

British Nonconformist minister and author (1662–1714)

The Reverend Matthew Henry
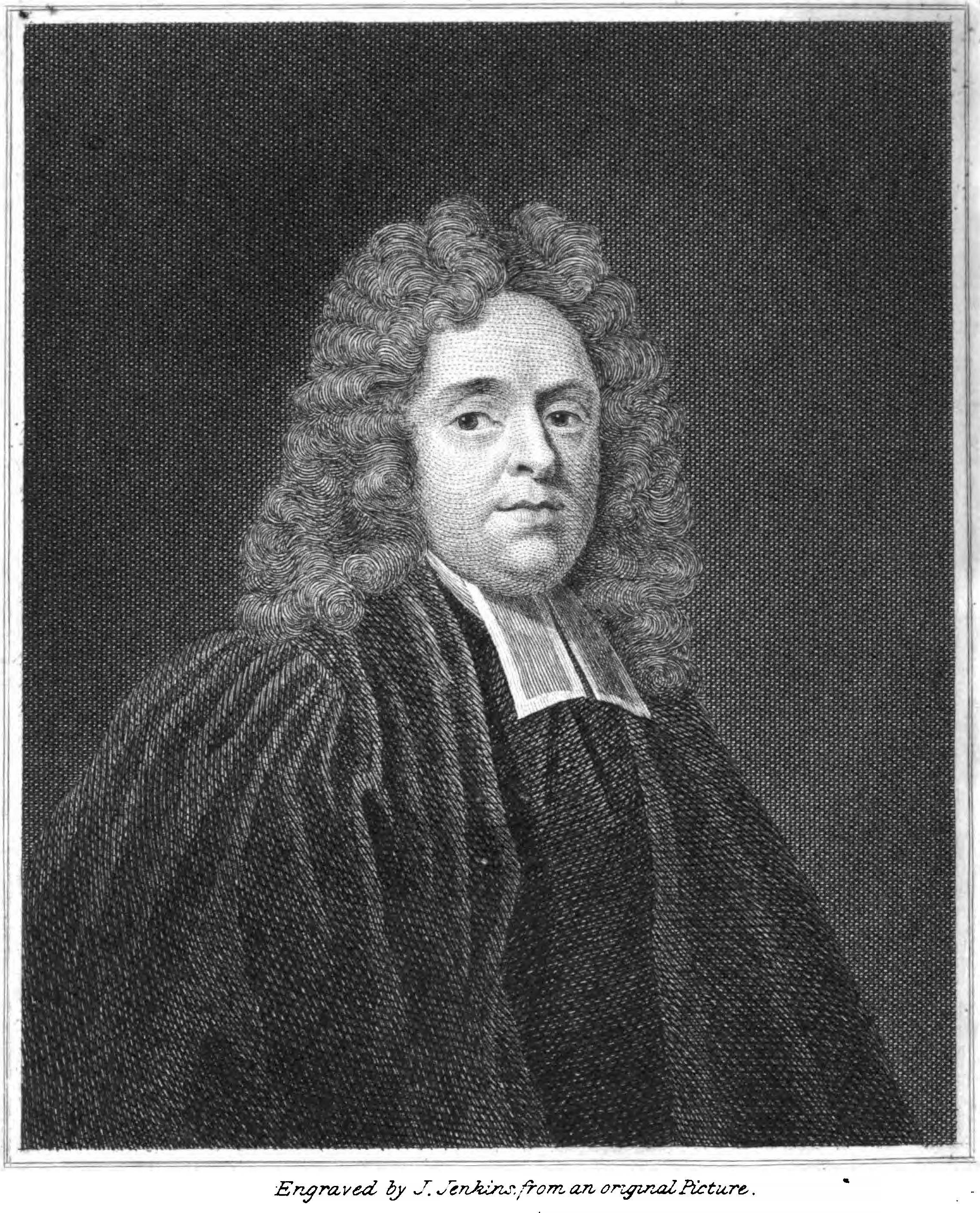
- Born: 18 October 1662; Flintshire, Wales
- Died: 22 June 1714 (aged 51); Nantwich, Cheshire
- Education: Gray's Inn
- Notable work: Exposition of the Old and New Testaments
- Spouse(s): Kathrine Hardware (1687–1689), Mary Warburton (1690-)
- Children: 9
- Parents: Philip Henry (father); Kathrine Matthews (mother)

Matthew Henry (18 October 1662 – 22 June 1714) was a British Nonconformist and Presbyterian minister and author who was born in Wales but spent much of his life in England. He is best known for the six-volume biblical commentary Exposition of the Old and New Testaments.

== Life ==
Matthew Henry was the second son born to Philip and Kathrine Henry. He was born prematurely at his mother's family estate, Broad Oak, a farmhouse on the borders of Flintshire and Shropshire. He was baptized the next day by the local parish rector. His father, Philip Henry, a Church of England cleric, had just been ejected under the Act of Uniformity 1662. As a young child, he was frequently afflicted with fevers. Unlike most of those who had been ejected, Philip Henry possessed some private means, and was able to provide his son a good education. Henry's sister was diarist Sarah Savage.

=== Early life ===
By the age of nine, Henry was able to write Latin and read part of the Greek New Testament. He was tutored in grammar by William Turner in 1668 who was temporarily staying at Broad Oak. His father provided much of Henry's early education at home. Henry practiced writing by copying his father's sermons and as a child he exhibited a natural public speaking ability. In 1680, at eighteen, his father sent him to a school in Islington, London to be tutored by the Nonconformist minister Thomas Doolittle. Henry later transferred to Gray's Inn, in the heart of the capital, to study law. While at Gray's Inn, he also studied French and literature. He soon gave up his legal studies for theology. Henry was invited by his friend George Illidge, to give his first sermon to a congregation at Nantwich. Having been well received he returned to speak two more times that summer.

==== Chester ====
In 1686, he was offered an invitation by a local Nonconformist minister to move to Chester, Cheshire and establish a congregation. He was initially hesitant to accept, not willing to take away members from an already established minister but upon Harvey's insistence he accepted. Henry was ordained on 9 May 1687 by a group of six Nonconformist ministers. He presented a paper written in Latin as part of his ordination. He then became minister of a new Presbyterian congregation at Chester. The congregation grew under his leadership and in 1699 he oversaw the construction of a new building. While in Chester, Henry founded the Presbyterian Chapel in Trinity Street. After becoming established in Chester, he began to travel around to nearby cities speaking. He became a member of the local Chester union of ministers. Henry said of living in Chester "I cannot think of leaving Chester, until Chester leaves me."

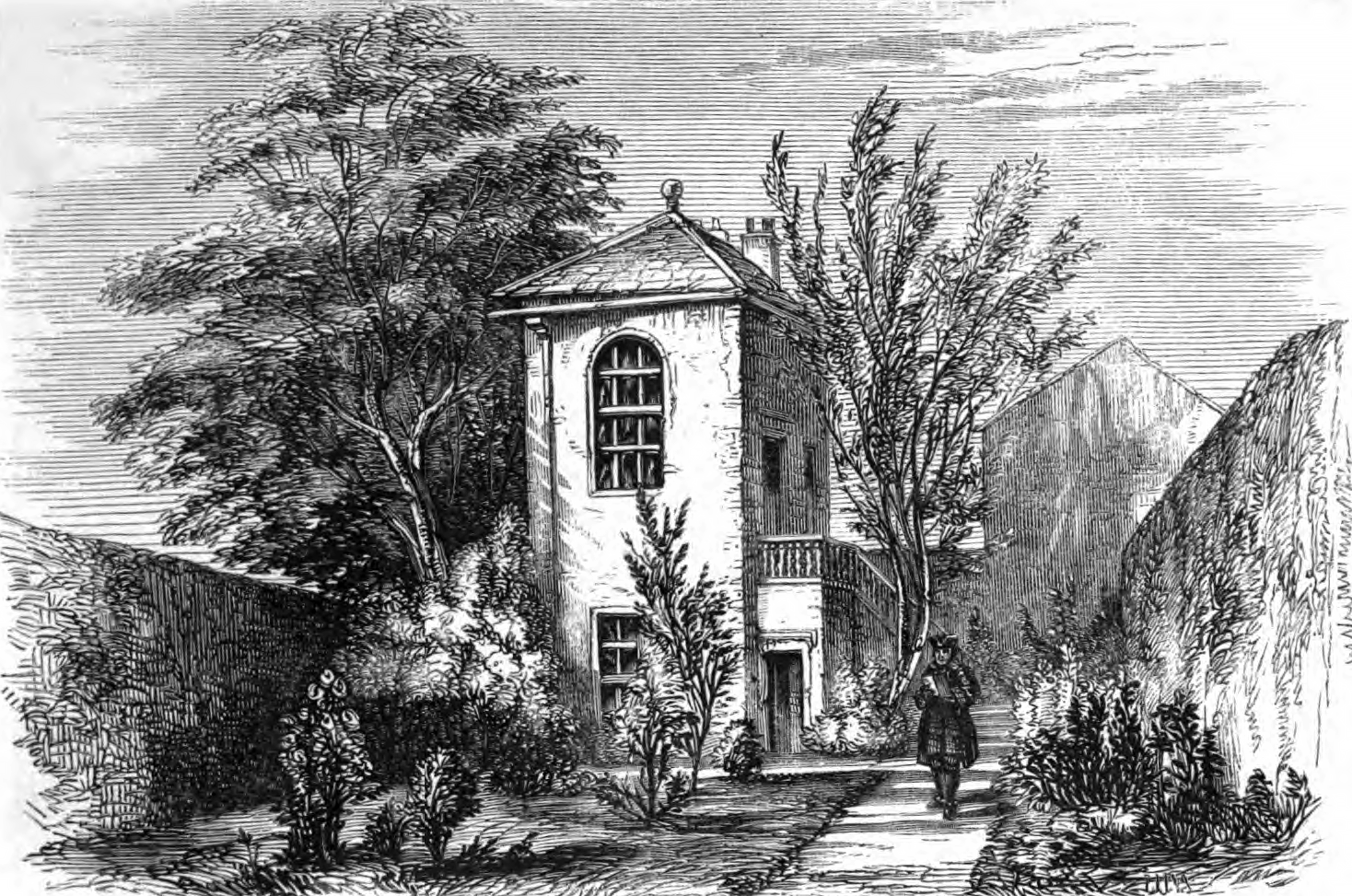
Matthew Henry Summer Home - Chester

After moving to Chester, he married Kathrine Hardware on 19 July 1687, after her mother initially objected to the marriage. Kathrine Hardware's parents then moved to Chester and Henry and his wife lived with them. Shortly after the birth of their first child, Kathrine died of smallpox on 14 February 1689, at age 25. He named the infant Kathrine after the mother, but the child died 15 months later. He continued to live with the Hardwares after the death of his wife and continued his ministerial duties.

He was introduced to Mary Warburton, a relative of Mrs. Hardware. On 8 July 1690, he married Mary Warburton in Chester. His second child, Elizabeth was born on 2 April 1691, and died in infancy in July 1692. A third child, born in 1693, died three weeks after birth.

At age 26 in 1688, the number of speaking engagements started to impact his health. He was frequently subject to fevers. A letter from his father instructed him "....in your earnestness [when speaking], keep the reins upon it." His impassioned speaking style was well-received by his listeners and contributed to his growing popularity. On occasion, he could move his audience to tears. He became a popular speaker and received constant invitations to speak and give lectures. He travelled almost weekly to different cities to speak.

He spent significant amounts of time studying and writing his sermons and lectures in advance. Henry preferred to use an expository speaking style. For each speaking engagement, he would employ different base texts to expand upon his general topic. His approach to teaching was "Choose for your pulpit subjects the plainest, and most needful truths; and endeavor to make them plainer." When writing, he would remain close to the literal interpretation of biblical passages. These writings would later form the basis on which he developed his commentary.

Between the years of 1687–1712, Matthew Henry continued to live in Chester. In 1694, Esther Henry was born to Matthew Henry and his wife. Esther lived to adulthood. On 24 June 1697 his daughter Ann was born. This child also died in infancy in 1698 in a local measles outbreak. Henry was very saddened at her death. Ann was his fourth child to have died in infancy. Matthew Henry and his wife Mary had their first son in 1700 and named him Philip, who later in life took his mother's name, Warburton. Another child, Elizabeth, was born in 1701. In August 1703, he had another daughter; this one he named Sarah after his older sister. Two more children were born who survived to adulthood: Theodosia in 1708 and Mary in 1711.

=== Journey to London ===
In 1698, Henry travelled to London to speak for the first time since moving to Chester. On the trip to London, he made speaking stops in Nantwich, Newcastle-under-Lyme, Lichfield and other towns on the way. Towards the end of this time period, he was frequently invited to speak in London where he eventually moved. He travelled to London again to speak in 1704 and this time Mary accompanied him. Up until this time, his health had been quite good despite the pace at which he worked. In August 1704 he fainted while he was speaking but quickly resumed speaking. The next two days he travelled to Nantwich and then to Haslington. Upon his return to Chester, he was bedridden with a fever for three weeks.

=== Hackney ===
He moved again in 1712 to Mare Street, Hackney after accepting an invitation to take over the ministry of the Hackney congregation. He began work there on 18 May 1712 with a congregation of less than one hundred members. He would also travel to Wapping, Rotherhithe and other surrounding areas and give evening lectures before returning to the duties of the Hackney congregation. Henry also began giving catechetical lectures in London. His Exposition of the Old and New Testaments was nearing the publication stage and was a contributing motive to the move to Hackney, close to the publisher. In 1713, his health began declining after a return visit to Chester.

=== Death ===
In 1713, he began suffering from frequent attacks of nephritis. He continued to maintain his frequent speaking engagements and work on his commentary. On 21 June 1714 Henry was on a speaking tour around Chester and was returning to Hackney. While en route, he was thrown off his horse but denied injury and insisted on making it to Nantwich where he was scheduled to speak. His travelling companions noted a lack of energy. That evening he could no longer travel and stopped at the Queen's Aid House in Nantwich. On 22 June 1714, he died of apoplexy.

== Literary work ==
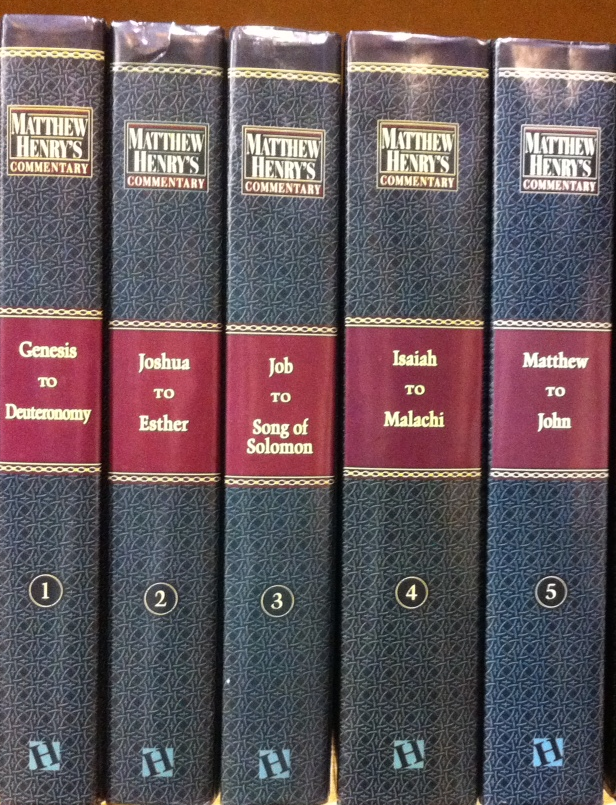
The Biblical commentaries written by Matthew Henry

Henry's well-known six-volume Exposition of the Old and New Testaments (1708–1710) or Complete Commentary provides an exhaustive paragraph-by-paragraph (or section-by-section) study of the Bible, covering the whole of the Old Testament, and the Gospels and Acts in the New Testament. Thirteen other non-conformist ministers finished the sixth volume of Romans through Revelation after Henry's death, partly based on notes taken by Henry's hearers. The entire Commentary was re-edited by George Burder and John Hughes in 1811.

Henry's commentaries are primarily theological, dealing with the scripture text as presented, with his prime intention being explanation for practical and devotional purposes, giving a theological commentary on each chapter of Scripture. Henry recommended Matthew Poole's Synopsis Criticorum for a more technical analysis.

Henry's Commentary identifies the "man of sin", the focus of latter day apostasy, and the Antichrist as the papacy in his interpretation of 2 Thessalonians 2:3. The commentary lists three "blasphemous titles" which it states have been attached to the "bishops of Rome." This anti-papist passage in the Commentary was not directly authored by Henry, but occurs in the sixth volume on Romans to Revelation, completed posthumously by his 13 friends.

Famous evangelical Protestant preachers used and heartily commended the work, such as George Whitefield and Charles Spurgeon, with Whitefield reading it through four times – the last time on his knees. Spurgeon stated, "Every minister ought to read it entirely and carefully through once at least." John Wesley published an abbreviated edition of the Commentary and wrote of Henry:

He is allowed by all competent judges, to have been a person of strong understanding, of various learning, of solid piety, and much experience in the ways of God. And his exposition is generally clear and intelligible, the thoughts being expressed in plain words: It is also found, agreeable to the tenor of scripture, and to the analogy of faith. It is frequently full, giving a sufficient explication of the passages which require explaining. It is in many parts deep, penetrating farther into the inspired writings than most other comments do. It does not entertain us with vain speculations, but is practical throughout: and usually spiritual too teaching us how to worship God, not in form only, but in spirit and in truth.

Several abbreviated editions of the Commentary were published in the twentieth century; more recently, Martin H. Manser edited The New Matthew Henry Commentary: The Classic Work with Updated Language.

== Quotations ==
Matthew Henry once said this about the relationship between men and women, from the story of the creation of Eve, in the Book of Genesis:

The woman was made of a rib out of the side of Adam; not made out of his head to rule over him, nor out of his feet to be trampled upon by him, but out of his side to be equal with him, under his arm to be protected, and near his heart to be beloved.

The quote is inspired by the words of Peter Lombard in his book Sentences:

She {Eve} was formed not from just any part of his body {Adam’s body}, but from his side, so that it should be shown that she was created for the partnership of love, lest, if perhaps she had been made from his head, she should be perceived as set over man in domination; or if from his feet, as if subject to him in servitude. Therefore, since she was made neither to dominate, nor to serve the man, but as his partner, she had to be produced neither from his head, nor from his feet, but from his side, so that he would know that she was to be placed beside himself.

== Bibliography ==
- The Miscellaneous Works of the Rev. Matthew Henry: Containing in Addition to Those Heretofore Published (1833)
- An Account of the Life and Death of Mr. Philip Henry (1712)
- The Communicant's Companion (1828)
- Directions for Daily Communion with God (1866)
- A Method for Prayer (1834)
- A Scripture-catechism, in the Method of the Assemblies (1714)
- The Miscellaneous Works of the Rev. Matthew Henry (1830)
- A Discourse on Meekness and Quietness of Spirit (1836)
- The Pleasantness of a Religious Life (1714)

== See also ==
- Philip Henry
- Sarah Savage
