= Rural Plains =

Historic house in Virginia, United States

- U.S. National Register of Historic Places
- Virginia Landmarks Register
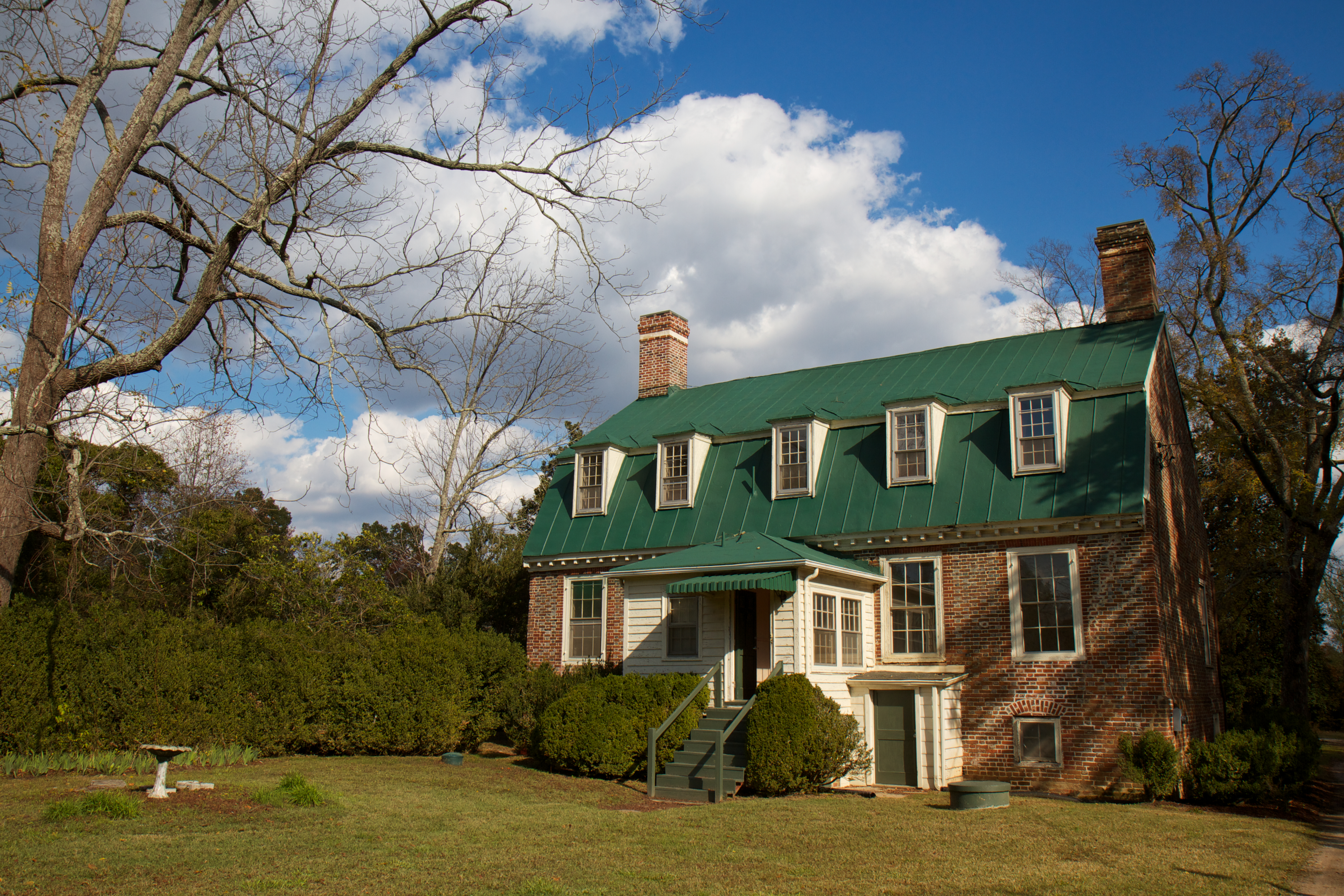
- Rural Plains, November 2010

- Location within Virginia Location within the United States
- Location: 6 mi. N of Mechanicsville off VA 606, near Mechanicsville, Virginia
- Area: 125 acres (51 ha)
- NRHP reference No.: 75002021
- VLR No.: 042-0029

Significant dates
- Added to NRHP: June 5, 1975
- Designated VLR: March 18, 1975

Rural Plains, also informally known as Shelton House, is a historic farm house dating to the 1660s in Mechanicsville, Virginia, Hanover County; it is one of the sites included within the Richmond National Battlefield Park. The building was added to the National Register of Historic Places in 1975.

== History ==
John Shelton built Rural Plains in 1670. A subsequent John Shelton, the tavern keeper at Hanover Court House, was the father of Sarah Shelton, who married the statesman Patrick Henry in 1754. Shelton family, as well as popular lore, state that this marriage took place in the house's first floor parlor, though evidence cannot confirm this claim. Sarah's father gave Henry and her a wedding present of 300 acres of the Rural Plains property, which became known as Pine Slash. Their original residence at Pine Slash was destroyed by a fire in 1757; they then moved into the overseer's house today. This building, referred to as the "Honeymoon Cottage" still stands today a mile away from the Shelton House.

During the Battle of Totopotomoy Creek (the house stands 0.4 miles away from Totopotomoy Creek) on May 30, 1864, the house suffered severe damage from artillery fire. Union signalmen climbed atop the house to convey messages to their troops. Confederate cannoneers tried to shoot them down, striking the building 51 times, but the signalmen survived. The scars of the damage remain today, but the Sheltons, who had sheltered in the basement during the battle, continued to reside in the house.

The house was continuously inhabited by nine generations of Sheltons until the property was transferred to become part of Richmond National Battlefield Park in 2006. The Park owns 124 acres and manages the site in cooperation with the private Rural Plains Foundation, which was established in 2013.

== Architecture ==
It was initially popularly assumed that the house was built around the same time as the property was acquired, but various architectural features, including brickwork, window size and the original gambrel roof suggested a style which was not used in Virginia until several decades later. The double-pile house is divided by a central passage and the front rooms are deeper than the back rooms. Each room contains a corner fireplace.

Many features which were in the house when first deeded to the National Park Service were not original. Much of the woodwork has been replaced. The rear front porch was relatively recently built. Additional windows have been installed. The single largest change in the house came during a major remodeling since construction; the high quality Greek Revival trim, doors, and windows from this remodel suggest that this remodeling took place in the second quarter of the nineteenth century. Since the property was obtained by Richmond National Battlefield Park, there have been continuous efforts to identify the original architectural features of the Shelton House and restore it to its original condition.

== Gallery ==
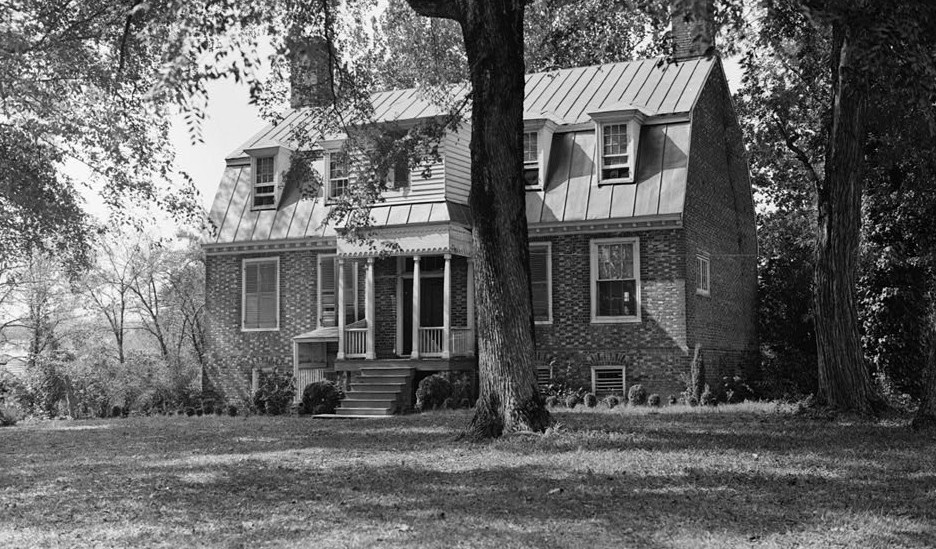
Rural_Plains, HABS Photo

== See also ==
- List of the oldest buildings in Virginia
