= Sarah Shelton Henry =

American woman, wife of first governor of Virginia (1738–1775)

Sarah Shelton (1738–1775), was the first wife of Founding Father Patrick Henry, the first Governor of Virginia.

== Early life and marriage ==
Shelton was born and raised in her family's home of thirteen rooms in Rural Plains in Hanover County, Virginia. In 1754, at age sixteen, Sarah and Patrick were married. Almost a year later, Sarah gave birth to her first child Martha and by 1771, the couple had six children together.

== Mental illness ==
Sarah Shelton did not start to show signs of mental illness until after the birth of her last child, Edward, whom many called Neddy. Patrick Henry's mother sent a letter to his sister which stated, "We feel Sarah is losing her mind after the birth of little Neddy". It is unknown when Sarah's private doctor strongly suggested that she be sent to the new Eastern State Hospital in Williamsburg, Virginia. However, her husband disagreed and did not want to send her to an asylum. He likely wanted to keep her home due to the horrible conditions and treatments. Patrick was politically active when he decided to keep his wife in confinement in the cellar of their home. Because of her husband's money and resources, she was able to avoid suffering the consequences of the poor laws.

It was said that her behavior was so unmanageable that "she was confined in a cellar room, bound in a straightjacket, and attended by a servant." After three or four years in confinement, Sarah died in the spring of 1775. Although the precise location of her burial is unknown, it is believed that her grave is thirty feet from the cellar door.

== See also ==
- Or Give Me Death, 2003 novel by Ann Rinaldi
- In Sickness and in Health: The Marriage of Patrick Henry and Sarah Shelton, 2021 biography by Mark Couvillon
