= William Henry (brother of Patrick Henry) =

William Henry (1734–1785) was the son of John and Sarah Winston Syme Henry. William Henry lived in Virginia and served in the House of Burgesses. He was elected to the Assembly as a member from Fluvanna County.

He was the older brother of Founding Father Patrick Henry, who is known for his famous "Give me Liberty or give me Death!" speech.
