= Patrick Henry =

American Founding Father (1736–1799)

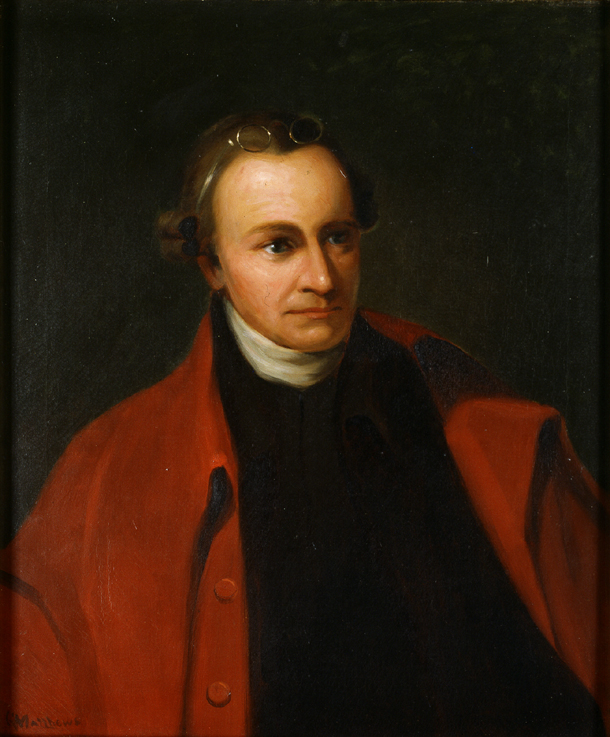
- Portrait by George Bagby Matthews after Thomas Sully, c. 1891

1st and 6th Governor of Virginia
- In office December 1, 1784 – December 1, 1786
- Preceded by: Benjamin Harrison V
- Succeeded by: Edmund Randolph
- In office July 5, 1776 – June 1, 1779
- Preceded by: Edmund Pendleton (acting)
- Succeeded by: Thomas Jefferson

Delegate from Virginia to the Continental Congress
- In office September 5, 1774 – August 1, 1775
- Preceded by: Office established
- Succeeded by: Thomas Nelson Jr.

Member of the Virginia House of Delegates
- Constituency: Henry County (1779–1784); Prince Edward County (1787–1790); Charlotte County (1799)

Member of the Virginia House of Burgesses
- Constituency: Louisa County (1765–1768); Hanover County (1769–1776)

Personal details
- Born: May 29, 1736 [O.S. May 18, 1736] Studley, Colony of Virginia, British America
- Died: June 6, 1799 (aged 63) Red Hill, Virginia, U.S.
- Resting place: Red Hill Patrick Henry National Memorial
- Party: Anti-Federalist; Anti-Administration; Federalist
- Spouses: Sarah Shelton (m. 1754; died 1775) Dorothea Dandridge Henry (m. 1777)
- Children: 17
- Parents: John Henry (father); Sarah Winston Syme Henry (mother)
- Relatives: William Henry (brother), Elizabeth Henry Campbell Russell (sister), Annie Henry Christian (sister)
- Profession: Politician; planter; lawyer

Military service
- Allegiance: United Colonies
- Branch/service: Virginia militia
- Years of service: 1775–1776
- Rank: Colonel (1st Virginia Regiment); Captain (Hanover County Militia)
- Commands: 1st Virginia Regiment; Hanover County Militia
- Battles/wars: American Revolutionary War

Patrick Henry (May 29, 1736 [O.S. May 18, 1736] – June 6, 1799) was an American politician, planter and orator who declared to the Second Virginia Convention (1775): "Give me liberty or give me death!" A Founding Father, he served as the first and sixth post-colonial governor of Virginia, from 1776 to 1779 and from 1784 to 1786.

A native of Hanover County, Virginia, Henry was primarily educated at home. After an unsuccessful venture running a store, as well as assisting his father-in-law at Hanover Tavern, he became a lawyer through self-study. Beginning his practice in 1760, Henry soon became prominent through his victory in the Parson's Cause against the Anglican clergy. He was elected to the Virginia House of Burgesses, where he quickly became notable for his inflammatory rhetoric against the Stamp Act of 1765.

In 1774, Henry served as a delegate to the First Continental Congress where he signed the Petition to the King, which he helped to draft, and the Continental Association. He gained further popularity among the people of Virginia, both through his oratory at the convention and by marching troops towards the colonial capital of Williamsburg after the Gunpowder Incident until the munitions seized by the royal government were paid for. Henry urged independence, and when the Fifth Virginia Convention endorsed this in 1776, he served on the committee charged with drafting the Virginia Declaration of Rights and the original Virginia Constitution. Henry was promptly elected governor under the new charter and served a total of five one-year terms.

After leaving the governorship in 1779, Henry served in the Virginia House of Delegates until he began his last two terms as governor in 1784. The actions of the national government under the Articles of Confederation made Henry fear a strong federal government, and he declined appointment as a delegate to the 1787 Constitutional Convention. He actively opposed the ratification of the United States Constitution, both fearing a powerful central government and because there was as yet no Bill of Rights. He returned to the practice of law in his final years, declining several offices under the federal government. A slaveholder throughout his adult life, he hoped to see the institution end but had no plan beyond ending the importation of slaves. Henry is remembered for his oratory and as an enthusiastic promoter of the fight for independence.

== Early life (1736–1759) ==
Henry was born on the family farm, Studley, in Hanover County in the Colony of Virginia, on May 29, 1736. His father was John Henry, an immigrant from Aberdeenshire, Scotland, who had attended King's College, University of Aberdeen, before emigrating to Virginia in the 1720s. Settling in Hanover County in about 1732, John Henry married Sarah Winston Syme, a wealthy widow from a prominent local family of English ancestry.

Patrick Henry shared his name with his uncle, an Anglican minister, and until the elder Patrick's death in 1777 often went as Patrick Henry Jr. Henry attended a local school until about the age of 10. There was no academy in Hanover County, and he was tutored at home by his father. The young Henry engaged in the typical recreations of the times, such as music and dancing, and was particularly fond of hunting. Since the family's stock, considerable lands, and slaves would pass to his older half-brother John Syme Jr., due to the custom of primogeniture, Henry needed to make his own way in the world. At age 15, he became a clerk for a local merchant and a year later opened a store with his older brother William. The store was not successful. His sisters were pioneer and writer Annie Henry Christian and Elizabeth Henry Campbell Russell, a Methodist lay leader.

The religious revival known as the First Great Awakening reached Virginia when Henry was a child. His father was staunchly Anglican, but his mother often took him to hear Presbyterian preachers. Although Henry remained a lifelong Anglican communicant, ministers such as Samuel Davies taught him that it is not enough to save one's own soul, but one should help to save society. He also learned that oratory should reach the heart, not just persuade based on reason. His oratorical technique would follow that of these preachers, seeking to reach the people by speaking to them in their own language.

Religion played a key role in Henry's life; his father and namesake uncle were both devout and were both major influences in his life. Nevertheless, he was uncomfortable with the role of the Anglican Church as the established religion in Virginia, and he fought for religious liberty throughout his career. Henry wrote to a group of Baptists who had sent a letter of congratulations following Henry's 1776 election as governor, "My earnest wish is, that Christian charity, forbearance and love may unite all different persuasions as brethren." He criticized his state of Virginia, feeling that slavery and lack of religious toleration had retarded its development. He told the Virginia Ratifying Convention in 1788, "That religion or the duty which we owe to our Creator, and the manner of discharging it, can be directed only by reason and conviction, not by force or violence, and therefore all men have an equal, natural and unalienable right to the free exercise of religion according to the dictates of conscience, and that no particular religious sect or society ought to be favored or established by law in preference to others."

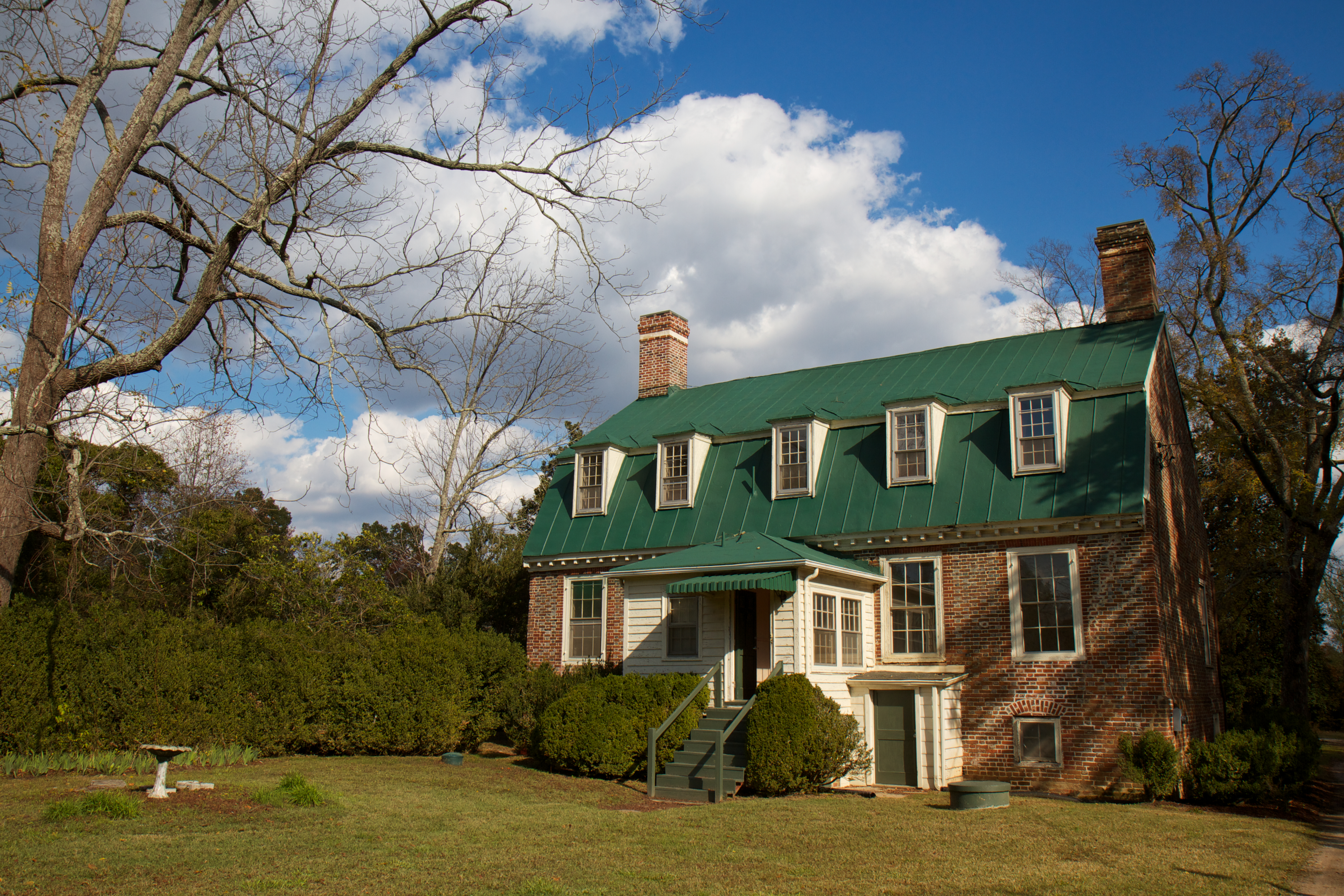
View of Rural Plains near Totopotomoy Creek in Virginia. Henry was reportedly married to Sarah Shelton in the parlor.

In 1754, Henry married Sarah Shelton, reportedly in the parlor of her family house, Rural Plains (which also became known as Shelton House). As a wedding gift, her father gave the couple six slaves and the 300-acre (1.2 km^{2}) Pine Slash Farm near Mechanicsville. Pine Slash was exhausted from earlier cultivations, and Henry worked with the slaves to clear fresh fields. The latter half of the 1750s were years of drought in Virginia, and after the main house burned down, Henry gave up and moved to the Hanover Tavern, owned by Sarah's father.

Henry often served as host at Hanover Tavern as part of his duties and entertained the guests by playing the fiddle. Among those who stayed there during this time was Thomas Jefferson, aged 17, en route to his studies at the College of William & Mary, and who later wrote that he became well acquainted with Henry then, despite their age difference of six years. Jefferson in 1824 told Daniel Webster, "Patrick Henry was originally a bar-keeper", a characterization that Henry's biographers have found to be unfair; that his position was more general than that, and that the main business of Hanover Tavern was serving travelers, not alcohol. William Wirt, Henry's earliest biographer, rejects Jefferson's suggestion that Henry's profession was a bartender but notes it would have been "very natural in Mr. Henry's situation" to do what was necessary to ensure that guests were properly seen to.

== Revolutionary lawyer and politician (1760–1775) ==
=== Parson's Cause (1760–1763) ===
While at Hanover Tavern, Henry found time to study the law. How long he did so is unclear; he later said it was as little as a month. On the advice of a local lawyer, Henry in 1760 applied for a lawyer's license, appearing before the examiners—prominent attorneys in the colonial capital of Williamsburg. The examiners were impressed by Henry's mind even though his knowledge of legal procedures was scant. He passed in April 1760, and he thereafter opened a practice, appearing in the courts of Hanover and nearby counties. Henry became a skilled lawyer because in court "he displayed quick wit, knowledge of human nature, and forensic gifts."

The droughts of the 1750s had led to a rise in the price of tobacco. Hard currency was scarce in Virginia, and salaries in the colony were often expressed in terms of pounds of tobacco. Prior to the drought, the price of tobacco had long been twopence per pound (0.45 kilograms) and in 1755 and 1758, the Virginia House of Burgesses, the elected lower house of the colonial legislature, passed the Two Penny Act, allowing debts expressed in tobacco to be paid at the rate of twopence per pound for a limited period. These payees included public officials, including Anglican clergy—Anglicanism was Virginia's established church—and several ministers petitioned the Board of Trade in London to overrule the Burgesses, which it did. Five clergymen then brought suit for back pay, cases known as the Parson's Cause; of them, only the Reverend James Maury was successful, and a jury was to be empaneled in Hanover County on December 1, 1763, to fix damages. Henry was engaged as counsel by Maury's parish vestry for this hearing. Patrick Henry's father, Colonel John Henry, was the presiding judge.

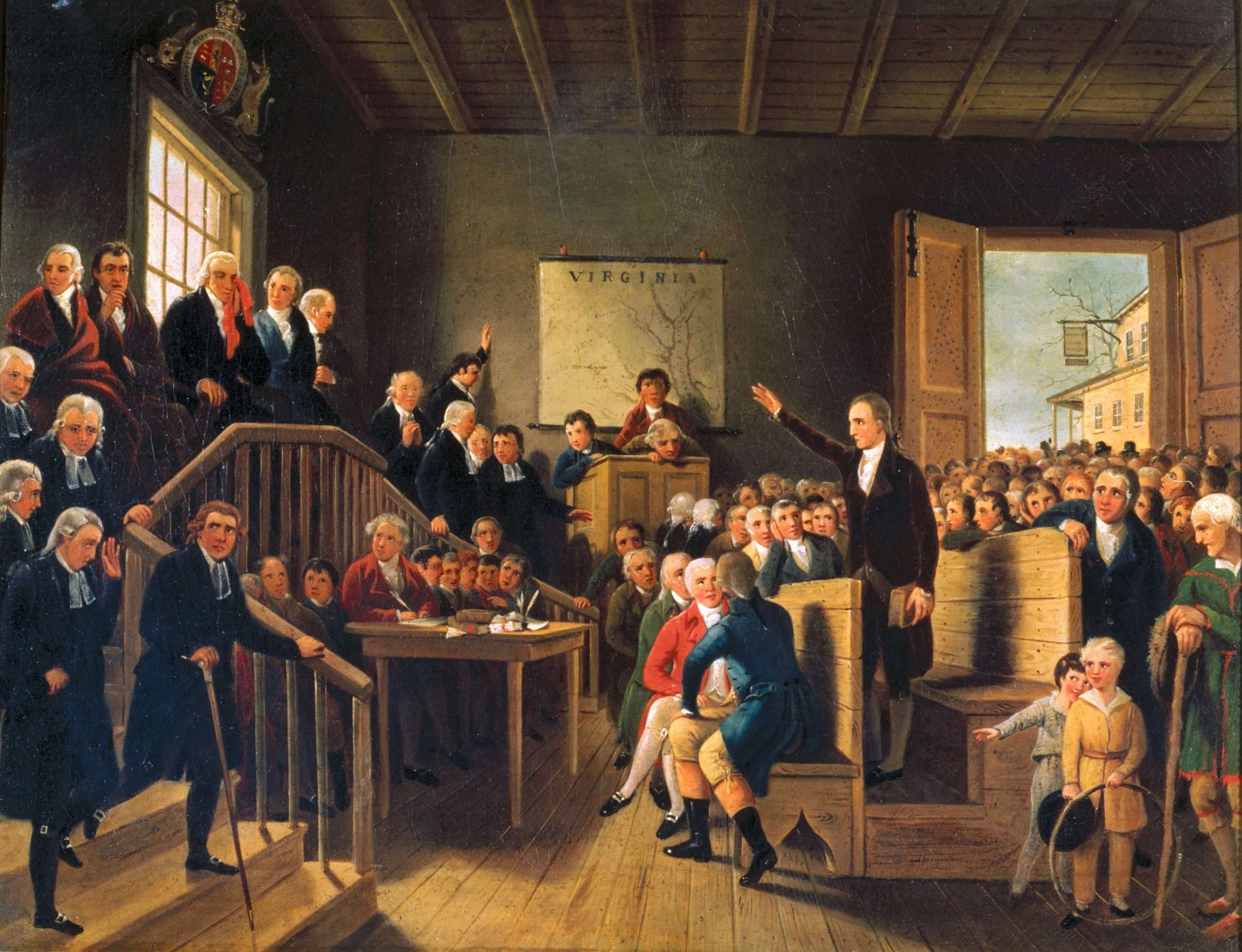
Patrick Henry Arguing the Parson's Cause (George Cooke, c. 1834)

After the evidence was presented proving the facts at issue, Maury's counsel gave a speech in praise of the clergy, many of whom were in attendance. Henry responded with a one-hour speech, ignoring the question of damages, but which focused on the unconstitutionality of the veto of the Two Penny Act by the king's government. Henry deemed any king who annulled good laws, such as the Two Penny Act, as a "tyrant" who "forfeits all right to his subjects' obedience", and the clergy, by challenging an impartial law designed to bring economic relief, had shown themselves to be "enemies of the community". The opposing counsel accused Henry of treason, and some took up that cry, but Henry continued, and the judge did nothing to stop him. Henry urged the jury to make an example of Maury, for the benefit of any who might seek to imitate him and suggested the jury return damages of one farthing. The jury was out for only moments and fixed damages at one penny. Henry was hailed as a hero. According to biographer Henry Mayer, Henry had "defined the prerogatives of the local elite by the unorthodox means of mobilizing the emotions of the lower ranks of religious and political outsiders." Henry's popularity greatly increased, and he added 164 new clients in the year after the Parson's Cause.

=== Stamp Act (1764–1765) ===
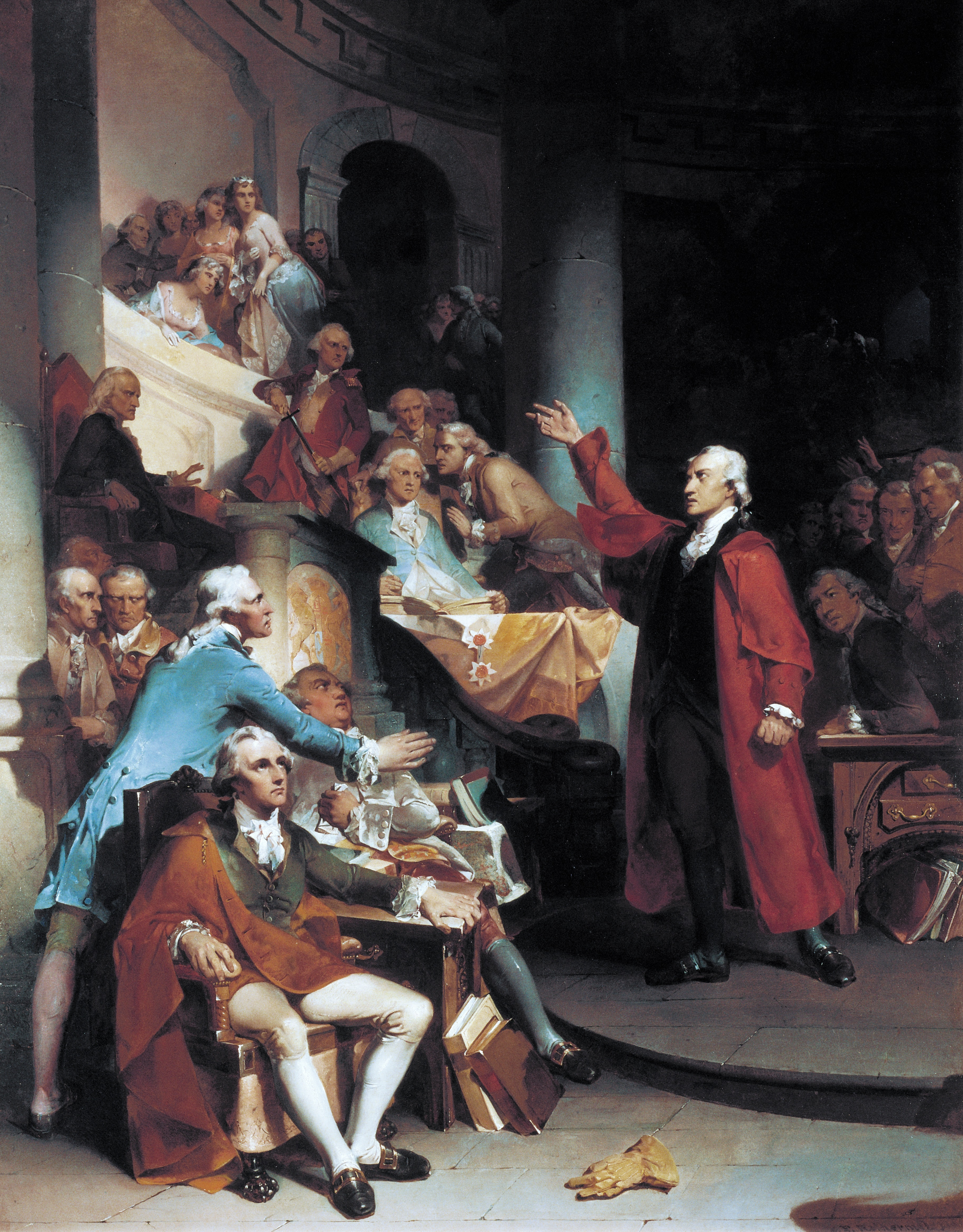
Patrick Henry Before the Virginia House of Burgesses (Peter F. Rothermel, 1851)

In the wake of the Parson's Cause, Henry began to gain a following in backwoods Virginia because of his oratory defending the liberties of the common people and thanks to his friendly manner. He boosted his standing further in 1764 by representing Nathaniel West Dandridge, elected for Hanover County, in an election contest before the Burgesses. Dandridge was alleged to have bribed voters with drink, a practice common but illegal. Henry is said to have made a brilliant speech in defense of the rights of voters, but the text does not survive. Henry lost the case but met influential members on the Committee of Privileges and Elections, such as Richard Henry Lee, Peyton Randolph and George Wythe. In 1765, William Johnson, the brother of Thomas Johnson (who had been one of Henry's clients in the Parson's Cause), resigned as burgess for Louisa County. As Henry owned land in the county (acquired from his father to settle a loan), he was eligible to be a candidate, and he won the seat in May 1765. He left immediately for Williamsburg as the session had already begun.

The expense of the Seven Years' War (called the French and Indian War in North America) (1756–1763) had nearly doubled Britain's national debt, and as much of the war had taken place in and around North America, the British government looked for ways of directly taxing the American colonies. The 1765 Stamp Act was both a means of raising revenue and one of asserting authority over the colonies. The Burgesses instructed their agent in London, Edward Montague, to oppose the measure, and other colonial legislatures similarly instructed their representatives. Considerable debate began over the proposed measure, and in Virginia pamphleteers developed arguments Henry had made in the Parson's Cause.

Patrick Henry was sworn into a sleepy session of the legislature on May 20; many of the members had left town. On about May 28, a ship arrived with an urgent letter from Montague: the Stamp Act had passed. On May 29, Henry introduced the Virginia Stamp Act Resolves. The first two resolutions affirmed that the colonists had the same rights and privileges as Britons; the next two stated that taxation should be exacted only by one's representatives. The fifth was the most provocative, as it named the Virginia legislature, the General Assembly, as the representatives of Virginia empowered to tax. Two other resolutions were offered, though their authorship is uncertain. Edmund and Helen Morgan, in their account of the Stamp Act crisis, suggest that Henry saw the Stamp Act as both a threat to Virginians' rights and an opportunity to advance himself politically.

If this be treason, make the most of it!

— Henry addressing the Virginia House of Burgesses

There are no verbatim transcriptions of Henry's speech in opposition to the Stamp Act. Texts are reconstructions, for the most part based on recollections decades later, by which time both the speech and Henry had become famous. For example, Jefferson, still in his studies at the nearby College of William & Mary, recalled the splendor of Henry's oratory. No attempt was made to reconstruct Henry's words until 1790, when James Madison wrote to former burgess Edmund Pendleton, but Madison learned that Pendleton had not been present; a second attempt did not occur until Wirt began work on his biography of Henry in 1805. A French traveler whose name is not known and whose journal was discovered in 1921 recorded at the time of Henry's speech that "one of the members stood up and said that he had read that in former times Tarquin and Julius had their Brutus, Charles had his Cromwell, and he did not doubt but some good American would stand up, in favour of his country". As Henry had seemingly called for the killing of King George III, there were cries of "Treason!" in the chamber, including by Speaker John Robinson. John Tyler Sr. (father of the future president), who was standing with Jefferson as they watched the session, called this one of "the trying moments which is decisive of character", and both recalled that Henry did not waver: "If this be treason, make the most of it!".

The Burgesses adopted the first five resolutions—the two others, which denied the right of any other body but the General Assembly to tax Virginians and which branded anyone who stated that Parliament had that right an enemy of the colony, were not passed. According to the Morgans, the passed resolutions differed little from language in petitions sent by the Burgesses to London in 1764, and the opposition to Henry may have been in part because he was an upstart in Virginia politics. On May 31, with Henry absent and likely returning home, the Burgesses expunged the fifth resolution, and Royal Governor Francis Fauquier refused to allow any of them to be printed in the official newspaper, the Virginia Gazette. With the official texts of the passed resolutions denied them, newspapers in the colonies and in Britain printed all seven resolutions, all of them presented as the resolves of the influential Colony of Virginia. The resolutions, more radical as a group than what was actually passed, reached Britain by mid-August, the first American reaction to the passage of the Stamp Act. In North America, they galvanized opposition to the Stamp Act and made Virginia the leader in opposition to Parliament's action. According to Thad Tate in Henry's American National Biography article, "Not only in Virginia but across the mainland British colonies, Henry quickly established his reputation as an uncompromising opponent of imperial policy." The Morgans note "In Virginia the Stamp Act provided the opportunity for Patrick Henry's spectacular entry into politics".

=== Lawyer and landowner (1766–1773) ===
Fauquier dissolved the Burgesses on June 1, 1765, hoping new elections would purge the radicals, but this proved not to be the case as conservative leaders were instead voted out. The governor did not call the Burgesses into session until November 1766, by which time the Stamp Act had been repealed by Parliament, preventing Virginia from sending delegates to the Stamp Act Congress in New York. Henry's role in the active resistance that took place in Virginia against the Stamp Act is uncertain. Although the lack of a legislative session sidelined Henry during the crisis, it also undermined the established leaders of the chamber, who remained scattered through the colony with little opportunity to confer as the public rage for change grew hotter.

When the Burgesses eventually convened, Henry sometimes opposed the colonial leaders but united with them against British policies. In the late 1760s and early 1770s, Henry spent more time concentrating on his personal affairs, though he advanced in standing within the Burgesses serving on powerful committees. The Henry family moved to a new house on his Louisa County property, probably in late 1765, and lived there until 1769 when he returned to Hanover County. His law practice remained strong until the courts under royal authority closed in 1774. Jefferson later complained that Henry was lazy and ignorant in the practice of the law, his sole talent trying cases before juries, and accused Henry of charging criminal defendants high fees to get them acquitted. Norine Dickson Campbell, in her biography of Henry, found Jefferson's comments unfounded, noting that Henry's rates were moderate for the time and citing earlier historians as to Henry's competence. Jefferson's comments came years after the two, once friends, quarreled. In 1769, Henry was admitted to practice before the General Court of Virginia in Williamsburg, a venue more prestigious than the county courts.

Henry invested some of his earnings in frontier lands, in what is now the western part of Virginia, as well as in what became present-day West Virginia and Kentucky. He claimed ownership though many of them were controlled by the Native Americans, and he sought to get the colonial (and, later, state) government to recognize his claims. This was common among Virginia's leading citizens, such as George Washington. Henry foresaw the potential of the Ohio Valley and was involved in schemes to found settlements. Income from land deals in 1771 enabled him to buy Scotchtown, a large plantation in Hanover County, which he purchased from John Payne, the father of Dolley Madison—she lived there for a brief time as a child. Scotchtown, with 16 rooms, was one of the largest mansions in Virginia.

Henry was a lifelong slaveholder from the time of his marriage at age 18. Henry professed that slavery was wrong and expressed hopes for its abolition, but he had no plan for doing so nor for the multiracial society that would result, for he did not believe schemes to settle freed slaves in Africa were realistic, "to re-export them is now impracticable, and sorry I am for it." He wrote in 1773, "I am the master of slaves of my own purchase. I am drawn along by the general inconvenience of living here without them. I will not, I cannot justify it." But the number of slaves he owned increased over time and as a result of his second marriage in 1777, so that at his death in 1799, he owned 67 slaves. In 1778, Henry and other planters, believing there to be a surplus of slave labor in Virginia, easily brought the transatlantic importation of new enslaved Africans to an end. The planters supported the effort to limit slave imports for their own economic reasons and for fear of slave rebellions, but they did not seek abolition of slaves already in Virginia, although moving towards abolition was said to be a reason for passing the act. With a surplus of slaves and the ability to import more African slaves cut off, Virginia later became a source of slaves sold south in the coastwise slave trade.

=== Renewed involvement and First Continental Congress (1773–1775) ===
In 1773, Henry came into conflict with the royal governor, John Murray, 4th Earl of Dunmore. The governor, appointed in 1771, had sent British soldiers to Pittsylvania County to aid in apprehending a gang of counterfeiters. Once captured, they were immediately taken to Williamsburg for trial before the General Court, ignoring precedent that judicial proceedings should begin in the county where the offense took place or where the suspect had been captured. This was a sensitive matter especially because of the recent Gaspee Affair in Rhode Island, in which the British sought to capture and transport overseas for trial those who had burned a British ship. The Burgesses wanted to rebuke Dunmore for his actions, and Henry was part of a committee of eight that drafted a resolution thanking the governor for the capture of the gang but affirming that using the "usual mode" of criminal procedure protected both the guilty and the innocent. They also penned a plan, adopted by the Burgesses, for a committee of correspondence to communicate with leaders in other colonies to inform and coordinate with each other. The members included Henry.

Although Henry had by this time come to believe that conflict with Great Britain, and independence, were inevitable, he had no strategy for this. The Burgesses were sitting when in 1774, word came that Parliament had voted to close the port of Boston in retaliation for the Boston Tea Party, and several burgesses, including Henry, convened at the Raleigh Tavern to formulate a response. According to George Mason, a former burgess from Fairfax County who joined the committee in the work, Henry took the lead. Mason and Henry formed a close political relationship that lasted until Mason's death in 1792. The resolution that Henry's committee produced set June 1, 1774, the date upon which the Port of Boston was to be closed, as a day of fasting and prayer. It passed the Burgesses, but Dunmore dissolved the body. Undeterred, the former legislators met at the Raleigh Tavern and reconstituted themselves as a convention to meet again in August, after there was time for county meetings to show local sentiment. They also called for a boycott of tea and other products.

The five Virginia Conventions (1774–1776) would guide the Colony of Virginia to independence as royal authority came to an end. Their work was advanced by many resolutions of county meetings, denying the authority of Parliament over the colonies and calling for a boycott of imports. The first convention met in Williamsburg in the chamber of the Burgesses beginning on August 1; Dunmore was absent from the capital fighting the Native Americans and could not interfere. Divided between those who wanted separation from Britain and those who still hoped for some accommodation, it met for a week; one major decision was the election of delegates to a Continental Congress in Philadelphia. Henry was chosen as one of seven delegates, tying for second place with Washington, burgess for Fairfax County, both receiving three votes less than Randolph.

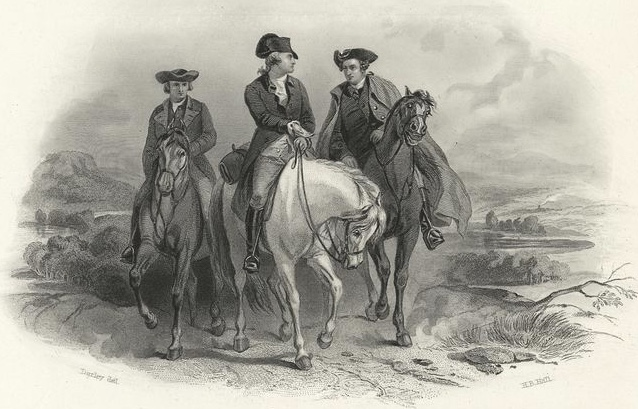
19th century engraving of Washington (center), Henry (right) and Pendleton riding to Philadelphia for the First Continental Congress

As Washington's estate, Mount Vernon, lay on the way from Scotchtown to Philadelphia, he invited Henry to stop there and to ride to Philadelphia with him. Henry and Pendleton, another Virginia delegate to the Congress and a political rival of Henry's, accepted the invitation. Delegates and prominent Philadelphians took an intense interest in the Virginians, who had taken the lead in resistance to Britain but whom few in the other colonies had met. This was Henry's first stay in the North aside from a brief business trip to New York in 1770, but he found that his actions were well known. The sessions began on September 5, 1774, at Carpenters' Hall. Silas Deane of Connecticut described Henry as "the compleatest speaker I ever heard ... but in a Letter I can give You no Idea of the Music of his Voice, or the highwrought, yet Natural elegance of his Stile, or Manner". The secretary of the Congress, Charles Thomson, wrote that when Henry rose, he had expected little from a man dressed as plainly as a rural minister. "But as he proceeded, [he] evinced such [an] unusual force of argument, and such novel and impassioned eloquence as soon electrified the whole house. Then the excited inquiry passed from man to man ... 'Who is it? Who is it?' The answer from the few who knew him was, it is Patrick Henry."

Henry was involved in the first dispute within the Congress on whether each colony should have an equal vote, taking the position that there should be proportional representation giving the larger colonies a greater voice. He argued that colonial borders must be swept away in the need for Americans to unify and create a government to fill the void left with the end of British authority, "Fleets and armies and the present state of things shew that Government is dissolved. Where are your landmarks? your boundaries of colonies? The distinctions between Virginians, Pennsylvanians, New Yorkers, and New Englanders are no more. I am not a Virginian, but an American." Henry lost the argument, and his theatrics made Congress's leaders afraid he would be unpredictable if placed on the lead committee charged with composing a statement regarding colonial rights. Instead, he was put on the next most important committee, one inquiring into commercial regulation. In the end, though, neither committee produced much of importance. Henry believed the purpose of the Congress should be to mobilize public opinion towards war. In this, he found common cause with John Adams and Samuel Adams of Massachusetts, but not all were of that opinion. According to Tate, Henry "turned out not to be an especially influential member of the body". The Congress decided on a petition to the king; Henry prepared two drafts, but neither proved satisfactory. When Congress on October 26 approved a draft prepared by John Dickinson of Pennsylvania, who had consulted with Henry and also Richard Henry Lee, Henry had already departed for home, and Lee signed on his behalf. The petition was rejected in London.

After the birth of their sixth child in 1771, Patrick's wife Sarah Shelton Henry began to exhibit symptoms of mental illness, and one reason for the move from Louisa County to Scotchtown was so they could be near family members. Henry's biographer, Jon Kukla believes she was the victim of postpartum psychosis, for which there was no treatment. At times, she was restrained in a form of straitjacket. Although Virginia had opened the first public mental facility in North America in 1773, Henry decided that she was better off at Scotchtown and prepared a large apartment for her there. She died in 1775, after which Henry avoided all objects that reminded him of her and sold Scotchtown in 1777.

=== "Liberty or Death" (1775) ===
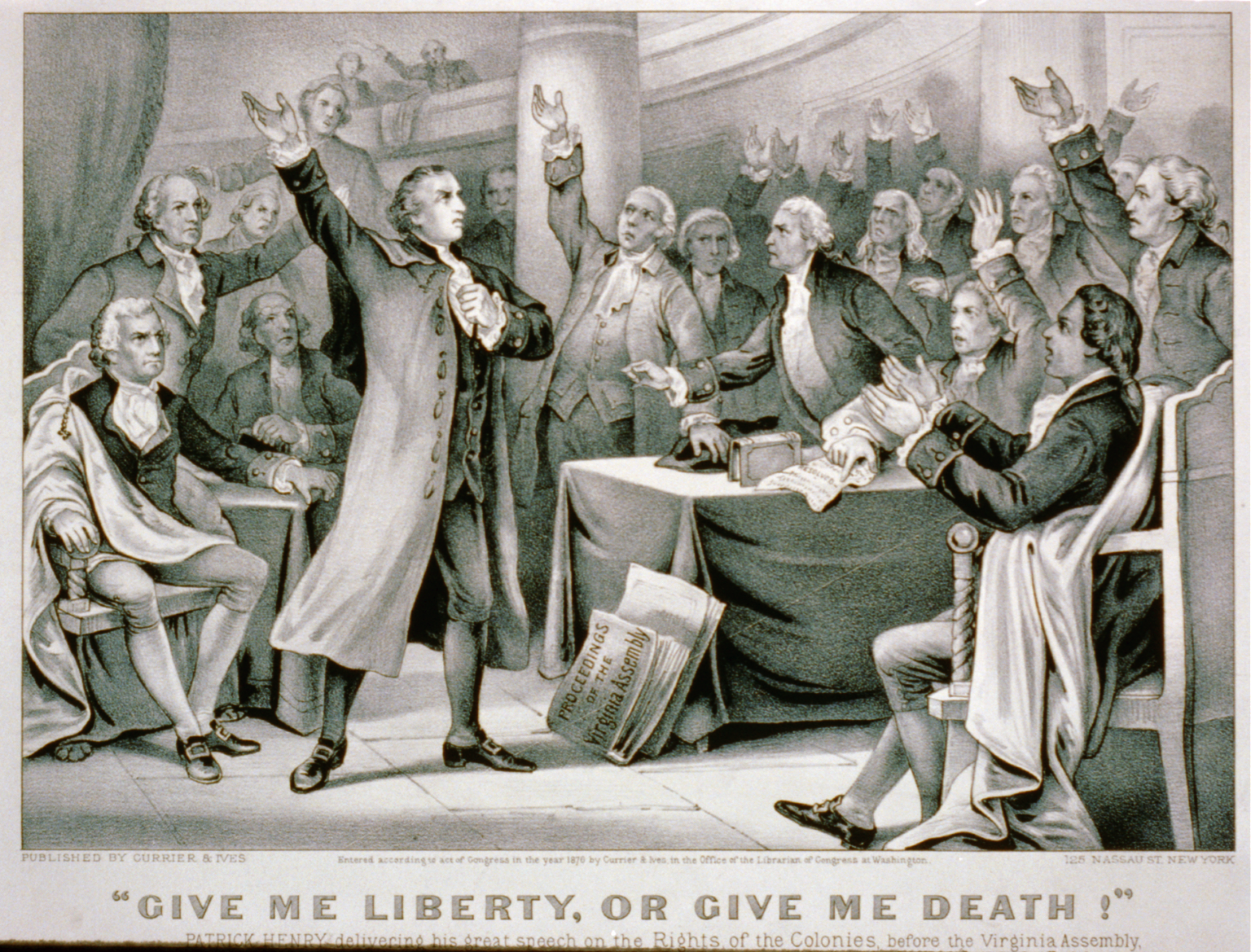
Currier & Ives depiction of Henry giving his famous speech

"Give Me Liberty or Give Me Death"
Read by Bob Gonzalez for LibriVox
Audio 00:08:51 (full text)

Hanover County elected Henry as a delegate to the Second Virginia Convention, which convened at St. John's Episcopal Church in the town of Richmond on March 20, 1775. Richmond was selected as better protected from royal authority. The convention debated whether Virginia should adopt language from a petition by the planters of the Colony of Jamaica. This document contained complaints about British actions but admitted the king could veto colonial legislation, and it urged reconciliation. Henry offered amendments to raise a militia independent of royal authority in terms that recognized that conflict with Britain was inevitable, sparking the opposition of moderates. On March 23, he defended his amendments, concluding with the statement for which he is well known:

If we were base enough to desire it, it is now too late to retire from the contest. There is no retreat but in submission and slavery! Our chains are forged! Their clanking may be heard on the plains of Boston! The war is inevitable and let it come! I repeat it, sir, let it come.

It is in vain, sir, to extenuate the matter. Gentlemen may cry, Peace, Peace but there is no peace. The war is actually begun! The next gale that sweeps from the north will bring to our ears the clash of resounding arms! Our brethren are already in the field! Why stand we here idle? What is it that gentlemen wish? What would they have? Is life so dear, or peace so sweet, as to be purchased at the price of chains and slavery? Forbid it, Almighty God! I know not what course others may take; but as for me, give me liberty or give me death!

As he concluded, Henry plunged an ivory paper cutter towards his chest in imitation of the Roman patriot Cato the Younger. Henry's speech carried the day, and the convention adopted his amendments. Still, they passed only narrowly, as many delegates were uncertain where the resistance urged by Henry and other radicals would lead, and few counties formed independent militia companies at the urging of the convention.

The text of Henry's speech first appeared in print in Wirt's 1817 biography, published 18 years after Patrick Henry's death. Wirt corresponded with men who had heard the speech and others who were acquainted with people who were there at the time. All agreed that the speech had produced a profound effect, but it seems that only one person attempted to render an actual text. Judge St. George Tucker, who had been present for the speech, gave Wirt his recollections and Wirt wrote back stating that "I have taken almost entirely Mr. Henry's speech in the Convention of '75 from you, as well as your description of its effect on your verbatim." The original letter with Tucker's remembrances has been lost.

For 160 years Wirt's account was taken at face value. In the 1970s, historians began to question the authenticity of Wirt's reconstruction. Contemporary historians observe that Henry was known to have used fear of Indian and slave revolts in promoting military action against the British and that, according to the only written first-hand account of the speech, Henry used some graphic name-calling that Wirt did not include in his heroic rendition. Tucker's account was based upon recollections and not notes, several decades after the speech; he wrote, "In vain should I attempt to give any idea of his speech". Scholars have argued to what extent the speech we know is the work of Wirt or Tucker.

=== Gunpowder incident (1775) ===
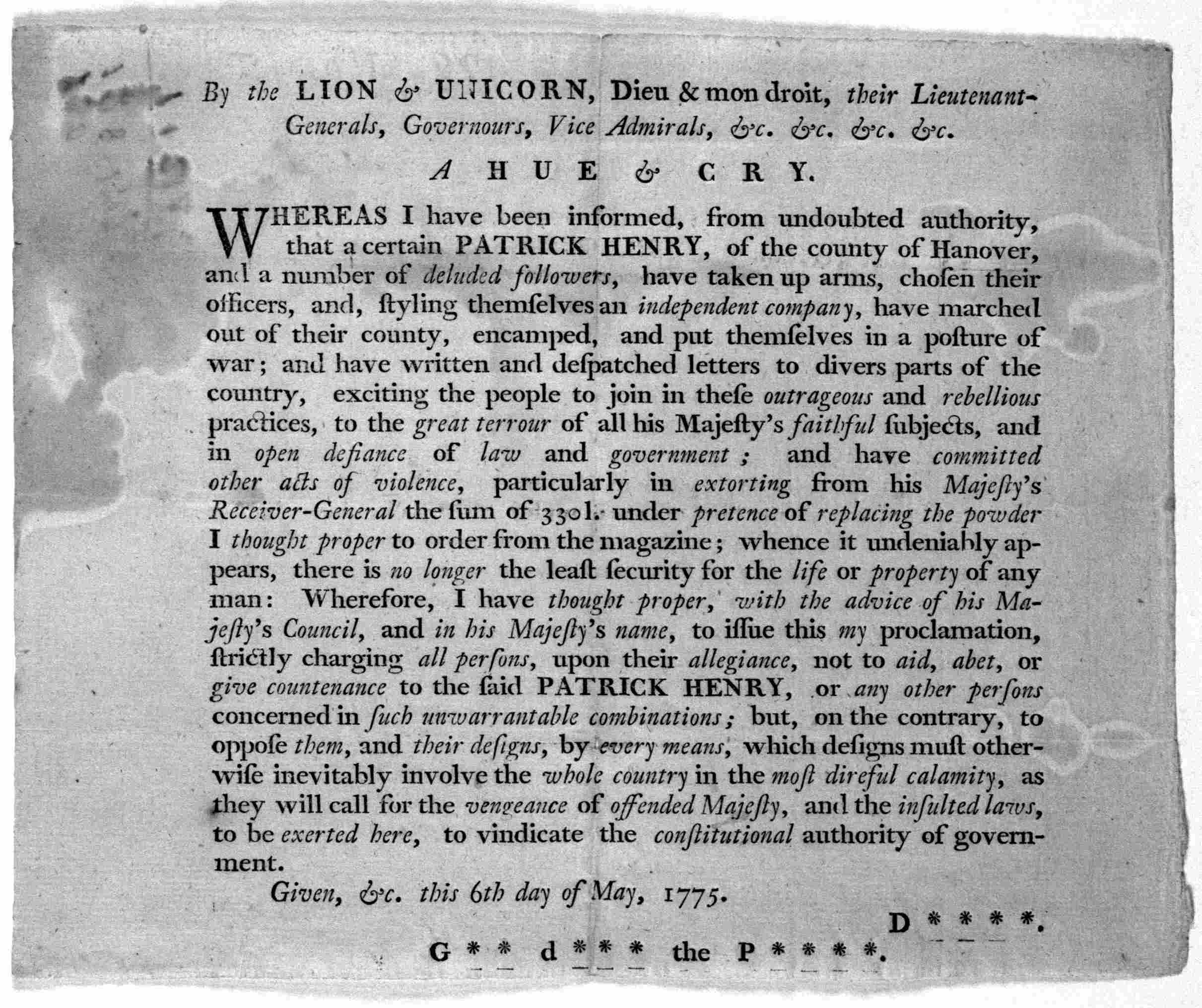
Royal proclamation against Henry, 1775

On April 21, 1775, Dunmore had British marines under his command seize gunpowder from the magazine in Williamsburg and take it to a naval ship. The gunpowder belonged to the government, to be issued in case of need, such as a slave uprising. Dunmore's actions outraged many Virginians. Henry had departed for Philadelphia, having been elected a delegate to the Second Continental Congress, but a messenger caught up with him before he left Hanover County, and he returned to take command of the local militia. Seeking the restoration of the powder, or that the colonists be compensated for it, on May 2, Henry led his troops towards Williamsburg with, as Dunmore wrote, "all the Appearances of actual War". By this time, word of the Battles of Lexington and Concord had arrived, and many Virginians believed that war with Britain had begun. With his troops reinforced by eager volunteers from nearby counties, Henry likely had force enough to take Williamsburg and deal Dunmore a humiliating defeat, but increasingly prominent messengers urging caution slowed his advance, and in New Kent County, still some 16 miles (26 km) from Williamsburg, three of Henry's fellow delegates to Congress helped persuade him to leave off his march. As Henry insisted the colonists be compensated, a member of the Governor's Council agreed to pay the value of the powder by bill of exchange.

Although Dunmore issued a proclamation against "a certain Patrick Henry, of the County of Hanover, and a Number of his deluded Followers", 15 county committees quickly approved Henry's action, and when he finally departed for Philadelphia, he was escorted to the Potomac by militia who lined the shore, cheering as his ferry pulled away. Not all approved; Henry's march appalled some moderates who feared he might provoke a conflict in which Virginia stood alone against Britain's might. They also saw him as a threat to the sanctity of property, for anyone's might be taken by Henry and his troops. As popular support for independence grew, opponents either joined in the movement or decided it was wiser to remain silent.

Henry belatedly arrived at the Congress on May 18, 1775. Jefferson later stated that Henry played only a supporting role, and though there is not a complete record, the fact that he was not written of as having an impact appears to confirm that. The Congress appointed Washington as head of American forces, an appointment that Henry supported. At the end of the session, in August, Henry left Philadelphia for Virginia and would never again hold office outside its borders.

While Henry was returning, the Third Virginia Convention in August commissioned him as colonel of the 1st Virginia Regiment, and he took up the appointment later that month. Although Henry had little military experience, this was not considered a major drawback at the time, and he was held to have distinguished himself in the march on Williamsburg. General Washington, though, felt that the convention had "made a Capital mistake when they took Henry out of the Senate to place him in the Field". In September, Virginia's Committee of Safety placed Henry in charge of all Virginia's forces. Despite the high title, Henry was placed under tight civilian control, and to an extent the willingness of moderates to go along with the appointment reflected a view that in that position, the volatile Henry would be contained.

Henry moved to organize his regiment and had no difficulty recruiting men. As commander, he organized a navy. In November 1775, Dunmore, who though he had abandoned Williamsburg still held Norfolk, issued a proclamation offering freedom to any black slave or indentured servant willing and able to serve in his forces, which already included several hundred former slaves. Henry wrote to all county lieutenants, stating that the proclamation "is fatal to the publick Safety" and urging an "unremitting Attention to the Government of the SLAVES may, I hope, counteract this dangerous Attempt. Constant, and well directed Patrols, seem indispensably necessary."

Henry saw no action himself, and there were murmurs in the convention against his command; some feared he was too radical to be an effective military leader. In February 1776, Virginia's forces were reorganized as they were placed under Continental command. Henry was to retain his rank of colonel but was placed under a former subordinate. Henry refused and left the army; his troops were outraged by the slight to him and considered leaving service, but he calmed the situation.

== Independence and first time as governor (1776–1779) ==
Henry did not sit in the Fourth Virginia Convention which met in December 1775, as he was ineligible because of his military commission. Once he was again a civilian, the freeholders of Hanover County in April 1776 elected him to the fifth convention, to meet the following month. Most delegates were for independence but were divided on how and when to declare it. Henry introduced a resolution declaring Virginia independent and urging the Congress to declare all the colonies free. When he at last spoke, according to clergyman Edmund Randolph, Henry "appeared in an element for which he was born. To cut the knot, which calm prudence was puzzled to untie, was worthy of the magnificence of his genius. He entered into no subtlety of reasoning but was roused by the now apparent spirit of the people as a pillar of fire, which notwithstanding the darkness of the prospect would conduct to the promised land." The eventual resolution was based in large part on Henry's and passed unanimously on May 15, 1776. As well as declaring Virginia independent, the resolution instructed the state's delegates in Congress to press for American independence, which they would, with Lee introducing the motion and Jefferson penning the Declaration.

The convention then proceeded to consider a constitution for Virginia's government. Henry was appointed to a committee under the leadership of Archibald Cary. Much of the work fell to the final appointee to the committee, George Mason of Fairfax County, who did not arrive in Williamsburg until May 18, delayed by illness. Mason first drafted a Declaration of Rights; it was discussed in the Cary Committee on May 25. Mason's draft, more than the final declaration, would be highly influential, used by Jefferson in writing the Declaration of Independence and by writers of many 18th- and 19th-century state constitutions. When the draft was debated, Henry, at the request of a young delegate from Orange County, James Madison, produced an amendment changing Mason's call for religious tolerance to one requiring full freedom of religion. This was seen as a threat to Virginia's established religion, Anglicanism, and did not pass. Madison reworked it and had another delegate introduce it, likely Randolph, and it passed. Mason's draft called for a ban on bills of attainder. Henry got it removed by telling the delegates that some high offender might be reached by no other means. The convention approved the Declaration of Rights on June 12.

Virginia's form of government, to be placed in its constitution, became a national concern; Jefferson, in Philadelphia though he would have preferred to be in Williamsburg, sent a plan, and John Adams sent Henry a pamphlet containing his own views, to which Henry replied, "your sentiments are precisely the same I have long since taken up, and they come recommended by you". But it was Mason's plan for the government of Virginia which dominated, with much power given to the Virginia House of Delegates, the lower house of the legislature. The House of Delegates and the Senate of Virginia together formed the General Assembly, as the Virginia legislature is known. Under the 1776 constitution, the governor, elected by the two houses of the legislature, was not even given the power to veto legislation and was required to act with the approval of the Governor's Council on important matters. Henry opposed the weakness of the governor, feeling it was risky at a time of war to have the executive so weak, but his views did not prevail. He had reason to rue the office's lack of power, as on June 29, 1776, the convention elected him as Virginia's first post-independence governor, by 60 votes to 45 for Thomas Nelson Jr. The election of Henry, at that time Virginia's most popular politician, helped assure acceptance of the new authorities but also placed him in a figurehead position, removed from the true power in the new government, the House of Delegates.

Henry was taken ill almost immediately upon being sworn in as governor on July 5 and recuperated at Scotchtown. He returned to Williamsburg in September and corresponded with General Washington about the military situation. Washington, who was less effective because of the inadequacies of his troops, complained about the state militias, feeling a Continental Army committed for the duration of the war was needed. Henry helped recruit new troops for Washington, but his efforts were hampered by several issues, including the weakness of Henry's office. In December 1776, with the General Assembly alarmed at reports Washington's army was in retreat as the British occupied Philadelphia, legislators granted Henry temporary expanded powers, something that Jefferson was still unhappy about years later, feeling that Henry was trying to set himself up as dictator. In March 1777, Henry wrote to Washington seeking permission to recruit soldiers for terms of up to eight months. Washington's anger in his response that such troops were not useful caused Henry to drop the matter, stating that he deferred to Washington's experience in military matters. Recruiting remained a problem; many Virginians were willing to be members of the county militia but did not want to join the Continental Army lest they be sent out of state or exposed to disease. Desertion was also a problem Henry labored to solve with limited success; many Virginians had been induced to enlist with promises they would not be sent outside the state or local area, and they left when orders came to march.

Henry was elected to a second one-year term without opposition and took the oath on July 2, 1777. On October 9 at Scotchtown, he married Dorothea Dandridge, daughter of his old client, Nathaniel West Dandridge of Hanover County. This made him closer kin to Washington, as Nathaniel Dandridge was Martha Washington's uncle. To add to the six children he had by Sarah Henry, he would have eleven more by Dorothea, though two by the second marriage died very young. She brought 12 slaves with her, adding to the 30 Patrick Henry already had. He sold Scotchtown in 1777 and moved to Leatherwood Plantation in Henry County, which the General Assembly had just created and named for him.

When Washington and his troops encamped at Valley Forge in the winter of 1777–78, Henry arranged for livestock and other food to be sent to their relief. There was discontent against Washington, who was not seen by some as a successful general, and this resulted in the so-called Conway Cabal. Henry supported Washington when Dr. Benjamin Rush of Philadelphia, one of those unenthusiastic about Washington, sent the governor an unsigned letter, discussing machinations against the general. Henry immediately sent Washington the letter, and though it is uncertain if Henry recognized Rush's handwriting, Washington did, tipping him off to the conspiracy. President Washington wrote of Henry in 1794, "I have always respected and esteemed him; nay more, I have conceived myself under obligation to him for the friendly manner in which he transmitted to me some insidious anonymous writings in the close of the year 1777 with a view to embark him in the opposition that was forming against me at that time".

In an effort to secure Virginia's vast claims in the West (to the Mississippi River and north to present-day Minnesota) against British and Native American forces, Henry in December 1777 sent George Rogers Clark on an expedition against Kaskaskia, site of a British and French settlement. This part of Clark's mission was secret; his public orders merely stated he was to raise a militia and go to Kentucky (then part of Virginia). Clark captured Kaskaskia in July 1778 and remained north of the Ohio River for the remainder of Henry's governorship. Although the expedition did not turn out as well as hoped, Henry trumpeted its successes, but after he left the governorship in 1779 and was elected to the House of Delegates, he became a foe of Clark.

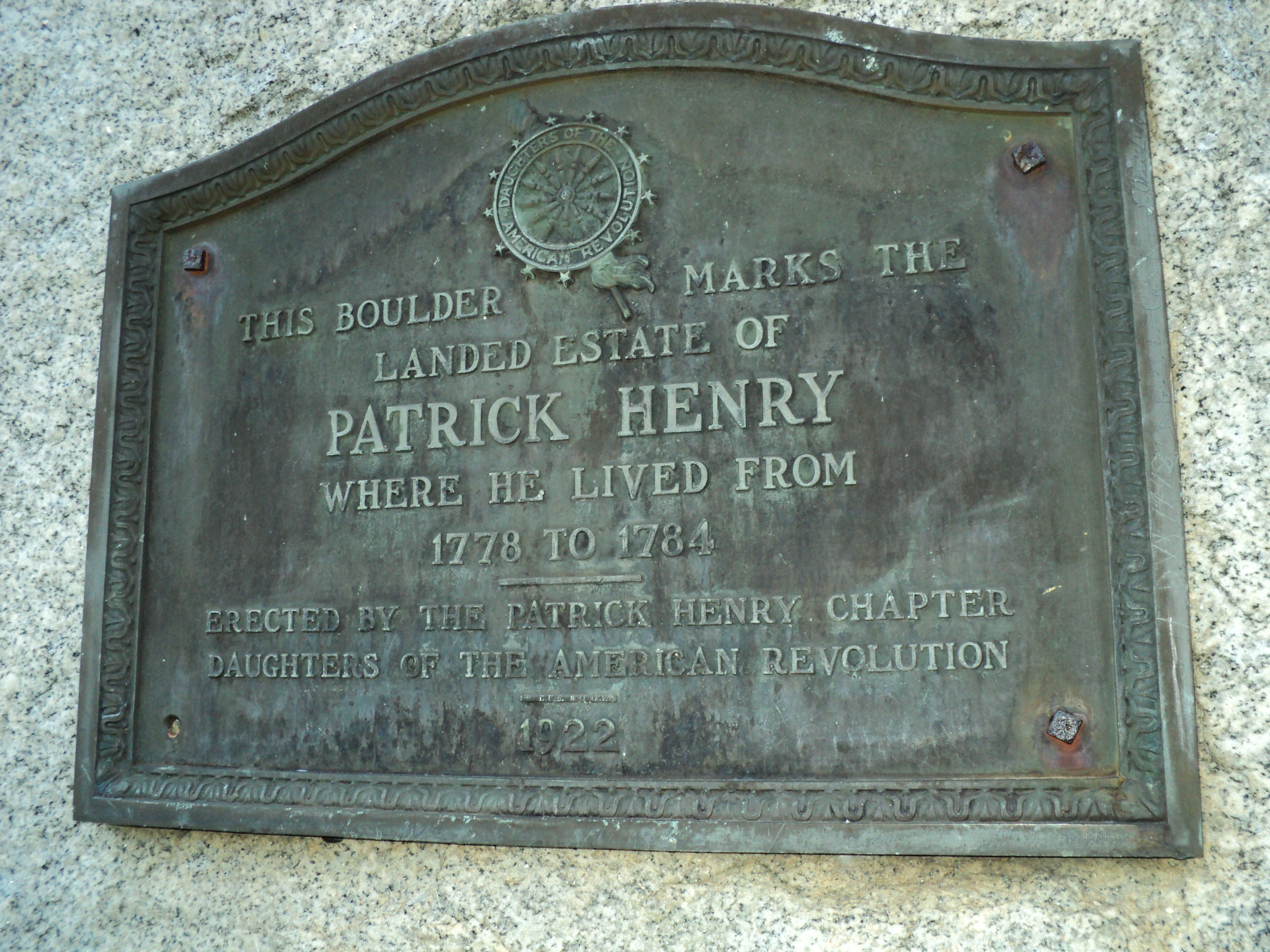
Boulder and plaque marking former location of Leatherwood Plantation in Henry County, Virginia

Henry was elected to a third term on May 29, 1778, again without opposition. Jefferson led the committee of notables sent to inform him of his election. In December 1778, Henry sent an urgent appeal to Congress for naval aid in protecting Chesapeake Bay. None was forthcoming, and on May 8, 1779, in the final days of Henry's governorship, British ships under Sir George Collier entered the bay, landed troops, and took Portsmouth and Suffolk, destroying valuable supplies. The British departed on May 24, and Henry, limited to three consecutive terms in office by the 1776 constitution, left office soon after, succeeded by Jefferson, and with his family returned to Leatherwood.

== Leatherwood and the House of Delegates (1779–1784) ==
At Leatherwood, Henry devoted himself to local affairs in the thinly-populated county and was given seats on the county court (the local governing body), as prominent landowners were, and on the parish vestry. He refused to be elected a delegate to Congress, stating that his personal business and past illness made that impossible. When Governor Jefferson sent a note to him in early 1780, Henry replied with gratitude, complaining of his isolation, and wrote of his many concerns about the state of affairs as the war continued. The freeholders of Henry County soon thereafter sent its eponym to the House of Delegates. But within weeks, health problems recurred, causing his return to Leatherwood. While in Richmond (where the capital had been moved) Henry opposed a congressional plan to revalue Continental currency and impose certain taxes, feeling it would mostly benefit the North. He was successful in defeating it, but after he left Richmond, supporters persuaded the legislature to pass it. Once he returned home, he was heavily involved in efforts to recruit local volunteers to suppress bands of Loyalists who were conducting raids in the frontier area. Henry rode with the troops, though he did not lead them, and they were generally successful in suppressing the resistance. The volunteers were disbanded in September 1780.

In January 1781, British forces under the renegade former American general Benedict Arnold sailed up the James River and captured Richmond with little opposition as Henry joined the other legislators and Governor Jefferson in fleeing to Charlottesville. Although Arnold soon withdrew to Portsmouth, in February, troops under Lord Cornwallis entered the state from North Carolina; the war, which had for the most part been fought out of state, would have many of its final moves played in Virginia. With Washington's army near New York, Henry sought to recruit soldiers to defend the state and in March helped draft an angry remonstrance from the House of Delegates to Congress, demanding help. Nevertheless, in May, British forces under Colonel Banastre Tarleton raided Charlottesville, nearly capturing the Virginia government, which fled to Staunton. There is a story that Henry fled with other prominent leaders and sought refuge at the home of a woman who initially spurned them as cowards for fleeing Charlottesville. But on learning Henry was with the group, she decided it must be all right, and offered them the best she had.

Jefferson did not go to Staunton: his term as governor had just expired, but the legislature had not met to hold an election. After the raid, he took refuge at his farm in Bedford County, and Virginia had no governor for ten days. Several legislators complained of Jefferson's actions and called for an inquiry into the conduct of the executive (Jefferson and his council), and Henry was among those who took the lead. The resolution passed, but the inquiry was set for the next session, and the legislature thought better of it. Jefferson was angered at Henry's actions and held a grudge that did not abate until well after Henry's death in 1799.

With the war effectively ended by the American victory at the siege of Yorktown, Henry served as delegate from his county through 1784, when he was elected again as governor. Peace brought many adjustments, and Henry sponsored legislation to reform Virginia's currency and to adjust payments from contracts still outstanding from before periods of high inflation. Jefferson and others wanted to reopen contracts that had been already settled but in depreciated currency; Henry thought that unjust, and because of his influence in the General Assembly, his version prevailed. This had international implications, as some of the creditors were British, who sought payment in hard money rather than the depreciated currency that had been paid into escrow. At the May 1783 House of Delegates session, Henry successfully sponsored a resolution to repeal the trade embargo against Britain. That passed despite opposition from Speaker John Tyler Sr. Henry also introduced legislation to permit Loyalists to return to Virginia. There was considerable opposition to that, and the measure was held over until later in the year, by which time public sentiment had been gauged through meetings in each county. Henry spoke in the debate, asking "shall we, who have laid the proud British lion at our feet, be frightened of its whelps?" Once it was amended (though in what way is not clear), the bill passed in November 1783.

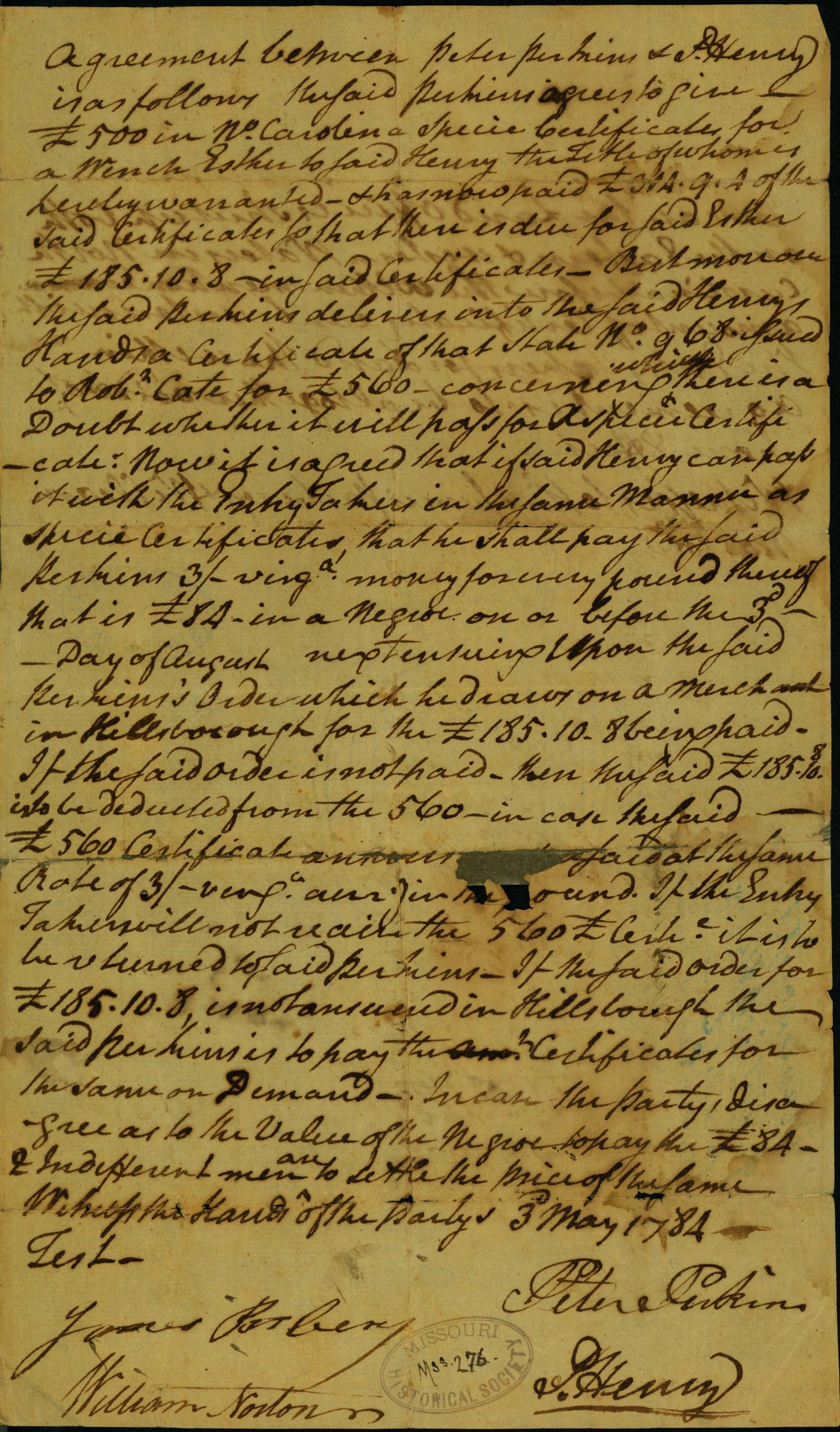
Agreement between Patrick Henry and Peter Perkins for the purchase of an enslaved woman named Esther, May 3, 1784

Henry worked together with James Madison, a delegate after three years in Congress, on a number of issues. They differed, though, on state support for Virginia's Protestant churches. Madison, like Jefferson, desired a separation between church and state that meant no public financing of religion, but Henry believed that taxpayers who were Christians should be assessed for the maintenance of the Protestant church of their choice, financing an array of churches in the way that Anglicanism had been funded in Virginia until the start of the war. Henry was not alone in this belief; both Washington and Lee supported such plans. According to Thomas S. Kidd in his biography of Henry, "the general assessment plan is one of the main reasons Henry is not more widely esteemed as a Founder, for in this debate, he seems to have diverted from the progressive flow of history." The General Assembly might well have passed the bill, but on November 17, 1784, the legislators elected Henry as governor. Madison believed that Henry took the position for family reasons—his wife and children were likely quite happy to be in Richmond rather than in remote Henry County—but the cost was Henry's bill as Madison got it postponed to the following year and eventually defeated. Instead, Madison got Jefferson's Statute for Religious Freedom through the legislature. This law requiring a separation of church and state passed the General Assembly in 1786.

== Second period as governor (1784–1786) ==
Henry's second time as governor was for two years, as the legislature re-elected him in 1785. It was, generally, more placid than his first. During this time, Henry and his family lived at "Salisbury", in Chesterfield County, about 13 miles (21 km) from Richmond in open country that he rented, though he had an official residence close to the Virginia Capitol, which was then under construction. The General Assembly had passed legislation for new arms for the militia, and Henry worked with Lafayette to have them sent from France.

Each county's militia was under firm local control, a state of affairs that had resulted in problems during the war as local militia refused orders from Henry and other governors when asked to serve out of state or conscript recruits into the Continental Army. In 1784, seeking to bring the militias under central control, the General Assembly passed an act terminating all militia officer commissions and allowing Henry, with the consent of the Governor's Council, to appoint replacements. The Virginia Constitution required that there be a recommendation from the county court. Instead of asking the county court, Henry solicited recommendations from prominent citizens in each county whom he or his council members knew. The result was near revolt in the counties, as citizens protested the act as unconstitutional, and counties refused to obey. The law went widely unenforced, and in October 1785, Henry requested the legislators to repeal it; they complied the following year.

Residents of western North Carolina, what is today the state of Tennessee, sought to separate and become the State of Franklin. A former delegate, Arthur Campbell, wanted to join Virginia's adjacent Washington County as part of the scheme in 1785. Henry had Campbell removed as a militia officer and from his other county offices, as well as ousting Campbell's supporters, replacing them with residents of known loyalty. Although Henry urged leniency in his report to the General Assembly that October, stating that the Washington County separatists had been led astray by anxiety because of the poor economy, he had the legislature pass a Treason Act forbidding the setting-up of a rival government within Virginia territory.

Henry also sought to advance Virginia's development, both as governor and through his personal investments. He backed schemes to open navigation on the upper Potomac and James rivers, envisioning canals to connect them to the Ohio River Valley. He also supported a scheme to develop a canal across the Great Dismal Swamp, believing that with it, the trade of eastern North Carolina would flow through Norfolk. He owned land along the proposed route and sought to interest General Washington in the scheme but was not successful. Despite Henry's support for internal improvements, he failed to notify Virginia's representatives of their appointment to meet with Maryland over navigation on the Potomac, and only two, including George Mason, attended what became known as the Mount Vernon Conference in 1785. Randolph, unable to attend because of lack of timely notification, hinted that the reason for Henry's neglect was not forgetfulness but a growing hostility towards things federal. In 1786, Henry was more assiduous in notifying delegates to the Annapolis Conference called with the support of Madison, who was appointed a delegate. Henry stepped down at the end of his fifth term, stating he needed to devote time to his family and earn money to support it. Randolph succeeded him as governor.

== Opponent of the Constitution (1787–1790) ==
Disinclined to return to distant Leatherwood after his time as governor ended in November 1786, Henry hoped to purchase land in Hanover County but bought property in Prince Edward County instead. Hampden-Sydney College, which he had helped found in 1775, is located in that county, and Henry enrolled his sons there. The local freeholders elected Henry to the House of Delegates in early 1787, and he served there until the end of 1790. Governor Randolph offered to make Henry a delegate to the Constitutional Convention, scheduled to meet in Philadelphia later that year to consider changes to the Articles of Confederation, the document that had governed the loose union among the states since 1777. Henry refused the appointment, alleging it would be difficult financially. One legend is that when Henry was asked why he had not gone, he replied, "I smelt a rat."

Henry's record of urging unity made him a potential supporter of a closer bond between the states, and as late as the end of 1786, Madison hoped for Henry as an ally in the fight. Several factors had eroded Henry's trust in the Northern states, including what he deemed Congress's failure to send adequate troops to protect Virginia settlers in the Ohio River Valley. Henry was outraged by the Jay–Gardoqui Treaty, which would have ceded exclusive navigation on the Mississippi River to Spain for 25 years. This was in exchange for commercial concessions that would benefit New England, where there was a growing separatist movement. Northern votes were sufficient to relax John Jay's negotiating instructions, which had originally forbidden restricting American navigation on the Mississippi, to allow him to reach a deal; Southern votes were sufficient to block the treaty's ratification. These events caused Henry and some other Virginia leaders to feel betrayed and to have little trust in the good faith of the North.

When the Philadelphia convention adjourned in September 1787, its president, Washington, returned home and immediately sent a copy of the new Constitution to Henry, recommending he support it. Henry was in Richmond for the autumn legislative session as delegate for Prince Edward County. While thanking Washington for presiding in Philadelphia and for sending the document, he said of it, "I have to lament that I cannot bring my Mind to accord with the proposed Constitution. The Concern I feel on this account is really greater than I am able to express." He hinted, though, that he was still open to changing his mind. This allowed Henry to remain noncommittal as opponents of the Constitution, such as Mason and Edmund Randolph (both delegates at Philadelphia) published their opinions, and to refine his views. In the initial Virginia battle over the Constitution, the call for a convention to decide whether the state should ratify it, Henry and Mason were among those who supported allowing the convention to ratify it, conditional on amendments being made. The matter was compromised with language allowing the convention's members full rein in deciding what to do, and it was set for June 1788, with elections in March; both those who supported it and those who did not felt time would be to their advantage.

Henry was elected to the convention from Prince Edward County without difficulty, though John Blair Smith, president of Hampden-Sydney, caused him some annoyance by having students read at an assembly, in Henry's presence, a speech by Henry on the subject of the Constitution and Smith's own rebuttal. Henry opposed the Constitution because of its grant of a strong executive, the president; he had not fought to free Virginia from King George to surrender such powers to what might prove a despot. Henry accordingly deemed the Constitution a backwards step and a betrayal of those who had died in the Revolutionary cause. At the Virginia Ratifying Convention, which began on June 2, 1788, according to Kidd, Henry's "personality blazed in all its power and glory." Henry suggested that the framers of the Constitution had no right to begin it "We the People" and ignore the powers of the states. He suggested that the document put too much power in the hands of too few. He noted that the Constitution, proposed without a Bill of Rights, did not protect individual rights:

Will the abandonment of your most sacred rights tend the security of your liberty? Liberty, the greatest of all earthly blessings—give us that precious jewel and you may take everything else. But I fear I have lived long enough to become an old-fashioned fellow. Perhaps an invincible attachment to the dearest rights of man may, in these refined, enlightened days, be deemed old-fashioned: if so, I am contented to be so.

Madison, the lead supporter of the Constitution, was inhibited in replying to Henry's criticisms, since he was ill through most of the convention. Henry likely realized he was fighting a losing battle as sentiment in the convention moved towards ratification, but he continued to speak at length, and his speeches fill nearly one-quarter of the pages of the Richmond convention's debates. Governor Randolph, who had become a supporter of ratification, suggested that if the convention allowed Henry to continue arguing, it would last six months rather than six weeks. After the convention voted on June 25 to ratify the Constitution, Henry was somewhat mollified by the fact that the convention had proposed about 40 amendments; some of them were later incorporated in the Bill of Rights. Mason, Henry's ally in opposing ratification, intended a fiery diatribe on the faults of the new plan of government; he was talked out of it. By one account, Henry told other opponents that he had done his duty in opposing ratification, and as republicans, with the issues settled in a democratic way, they had best all go home. Madison wrote to Washington that Henry still hoped for amendments to weaken the power of the federal government, possibly to be proposed by a second national convention.

Henry returned to the House of Delegates where he successfully defeated Madison's effort to become federal senator from Virginia, for under the original Constitution senators were elected by legislators, not the people. Although Henry made it clear he would not serve in office outside Virginia, he received a number of votes in the election. Madison gained election to the House of Representatives in a district where he was opposed by James Monroe, though Madison's supporters complained that Henry's supporters in the legislature had unfairly placed Orange County, Madison's home county, in a district leaning anti-Federalist. Henry also saw to it that the requested amendments were incorporated in petitions from the legislature to the federal Congress. Despite his qualms, Henry served as one of Virginia's presidential electors, voting for Washington (elected President) and John Adams (elected Vice President). Henry was disappointed when the First Congress passed only amendments dealing with personal liberties, not those designed to weaken the government.

A final cause Henry engaged in before leaving the House of Delegates at the end of 1790 was over the Funding Act of 1790, by which the federal government took over the debts of the states, much of which dated from the Revolutionary War. On November 3, 1790, Henry introduced a resolution which was passed by the House of Delegates and by the state Senate, declaring the act "repugnant to the constitution of the United States, as it goes to the exercise of a power not granted to the general [federal] government". This would prove the first of many resolutions passed by Southern state legislatures in the decades to come, defending states' rights and strict interpretation of the Constitution.

== Later years ==
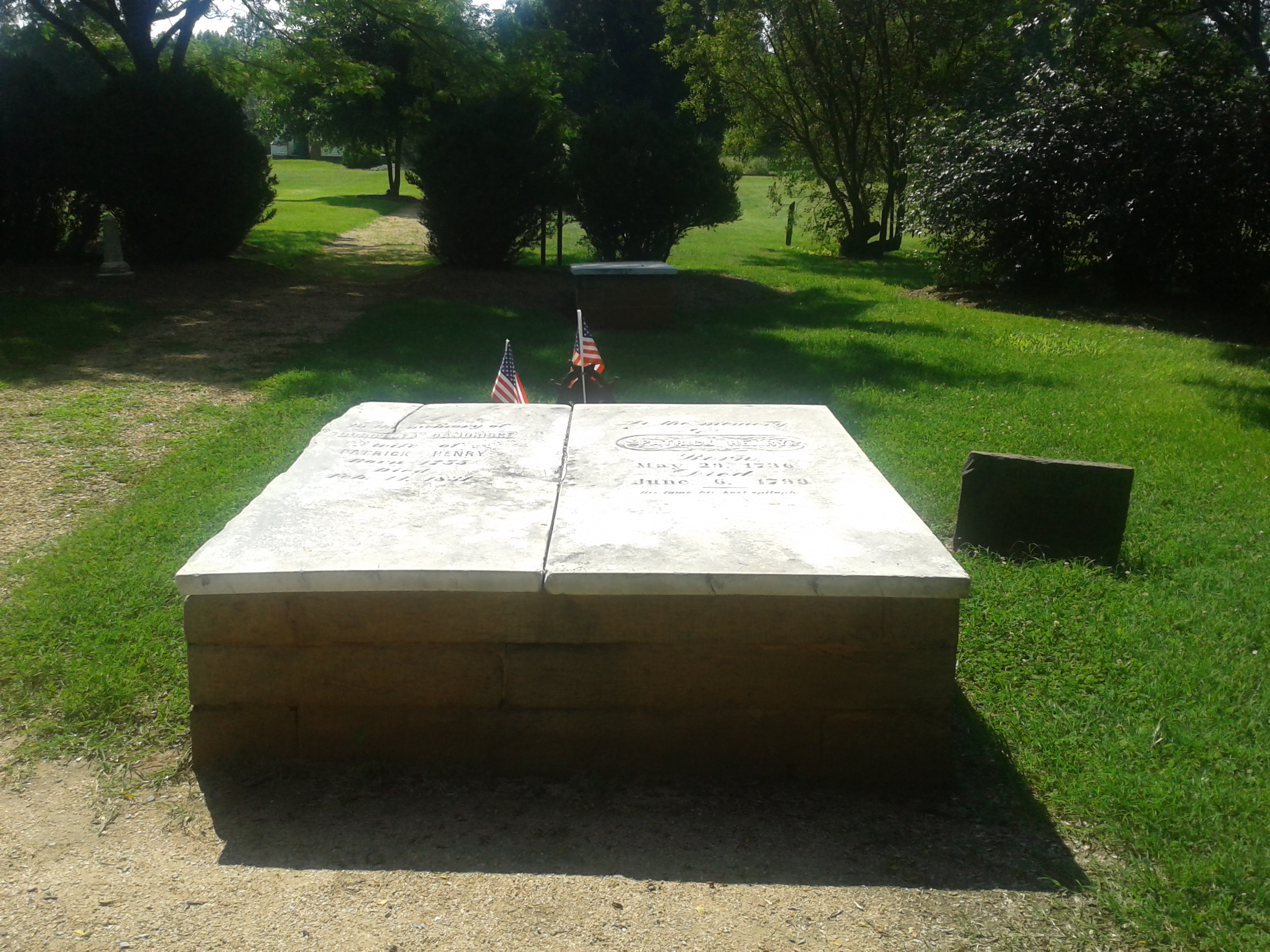
Graves of Patrick Henry and his wife Dorothea in the family burying ground at Red Hill. Henry's inscription reads, "His fame his best epitaph".

Leaving the House of Delegates after 1790, Henry found himself in debt, owing in part to expenses while governor, and sought to secure his family's fortune through land speculation and a return to the practice of law. Not fully reconciled to the federal government, Henry contemplated a new republic in the sparsely settled frontier lands, but his plans came to nothing. He did not travel as widely for cases as he had in the 1760s, confining his practice mostly to Prince Edward and Bedford counties, though in a compelling case, or for a large enough fee, he would travel to Richmond or over the mountains to Greenbrier County (today in West Virginia).

When the new federal court opened in Virginia in 1790, British creditors promptly filed over a hundred cases seeking to enforce claims from the Revolutionary War. Henry was part of the defense team in Jones v. Walker before the federal court in 1791; his co-counsel included John Marshall, who prepared the written pleadings while Henry did much of the courtroom advocacy. Henry argued the case for three days; Marshall, looking back, called him "a great orator ... and much more, a learned lawyer, a most accurate thinker, and a profound reasoner". The case ended inconclusively after one of the judges died, but the legal teams reassembled for the case of Ware v. Hylton. Argued before another three-judge panel that included Chief Justice of the United States John Jay and Associate Justice James Iredell, Henry's argument provoked Justice Iredell to exclaim, "Gracious God! He is an orator indeed." Henry and Marshall were initially successful, but the plaintiffs appealed, and after Marshall argued his only case before the Supreme Court, that court in 1796 ruled for the British creditors.

Henry's friendship with Washington had cooled somewhat amid the ratification debates, but by 1794, both men were looking to reconcile. Henry found himself more aligned with Washington than with Jefferson and Madison, and Washington still considered himself indebted to Henry for notifying him about the Conway Cabal. Washington offered Henry a seat on the Supreme Court in 1794, but he refused, feeling his family needed him. Washington also tried to get Henry to accept positions as Secretary of State and as minister to Spain, and Virginia Governor "Light-Horse" Harry Lee wanted to appoint him to the Senate. Henry refused each time. Henry's continuing popularity in Virginia made him an attractive ally, and even Jefferson tried to recruit him, sending word though a mutual friend that he bore no grudge. After Washington made it clear he would not seek a third term in 1796, Marshall and Lee discussed a possible Henry run for president with him, but Henry was unwilling. The General Assembly elected him as governor again that year, but he declined, citing age and health. Henry's refusal to accept these offices increased his popularity as he was, like Washington, seen as a Cincinnatus, giving up power to return to his farm and his plow.

Henry sold his property in Prince Edward County in 1792, moving with his family to Long Island, a plantation in Campbell County. In 1794, Henry purchased Red Hill near Brookneal, Virginia in Charlotte County, where he and his family lived much of the year, though they moved to Long Island in the "sickly season". Henry was gratified at the election of his old friend John Adams as president in 1796 over his foe Jefferson, but Henry's commitment to the Federalist Party was tested by the repressive Alien and Sedition Acts of 1798. He chose to say nothing but supported the campaign of Marshall, a moderate Federalist, for the House of Representatives; Marshall won narrowly. Henry was under considerable pressure from Virginia Federalists to return to politics, but it was not until former president Washington urged him to run for the legislature in early 1799 that Henry gave in. Turning down an offer from President Adams to make him an envoy to France, Henry was elected as delegate from Charlotte County on March 4, 1799. The legislature had no immediate session scheduled, so he returned to Red Hill and never left again, dying there of intussusception at his home on June 6, 1799. He was buried at Red Hill. In Henry's will, he left his estates and his 67 slaves to be divided between his wife and his six sons. He did not free any slaves, despite his speeches against enslavement by tyrants and despite his various comments opposing the institution of slavery itself.

The tributes to Henry upon his death were many. The Virginia Gazette printed a death notice bordered in black, "As long as our rivers flow, or mountains stand, Virginia ... will say to rising generations, imitate my H E N R Y". The Petersburg Intelligencer regretted the death of a man who might have been able "to conciliate all parties and produce that harmony and accord" needed at a time of national controversy. The Argus, a paper which supported Jefferson's faction, noted that Henry "pointed out those evils in our Constitution ... against which we now complain ... If any are disposed to censure Mr. Henry for his late political transition [to supporting the Federalists], if anything has been written on that subject, let the Genius of American Independence drop a tear, and blot it out forever."

== Monuments and memorials ==
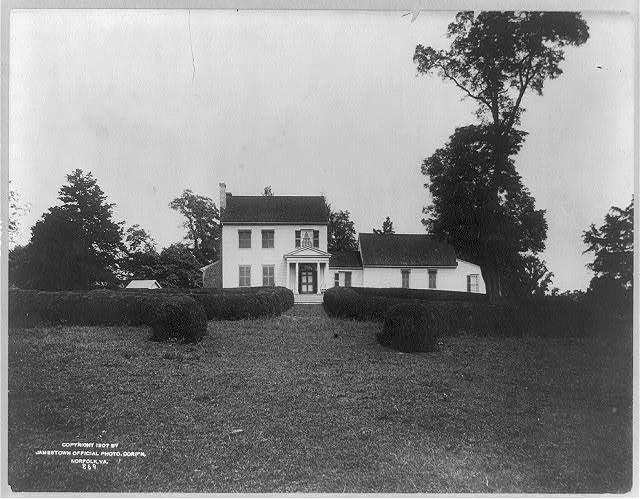
Red Hill Plantation, Virginia, c. 1907

Several of Henry's homes are recognized for their association with him. Scotchtown Plantation is a National Historic Landmark. The Red Hill Patrick Henry National Memorial preserves Henry's final home, gravesite, and law office. The site of his birthplace, which burned in 1807 and is now reduced to archaeological remains, is also preserved; it is listed on the National Register of Historic Places. A plaque placed by the Daughters of the American Revolution marks the site of Leatherwood in Henry County.

Henry helped found Hampden-Sydney College, believing that "every free state" should promote "useful knowledge amongst its citizens". He was an original trustee and sent seven of his sons there. Henry was instrumental in getting its charter passed by the General Assembly in 1783. Emory and Henry University in Emory, Virginia was named for him and John Emory, an early bishop in Virginia. According to the college, "Bishop Emory symbolizes belief in the union of faith and learning, while Governor Henry represents the commitment to the ideals of freedom and civic virtue."

Fort Henry stood in what is now Wheeling, West Virginia, but was at the time part of Virginia. It was built in 1774 and named Fort Fincastle after one of Lord Dunmore's titles but was renamed for Henry, then governor, after independence. Fort Patrick Henry was built during the American Revolutionary War along the South Fork Holston River at the present-day site of Kingsport, Tennessee. This fort serves as the namesake of Fort Patrick Henry Dam and its reservoir on the river. At least four ships have been named in Henry's honor: the passenger and freight packet ship Patrick Henry, the Civil War Confederate Navy steamboat CSS Patrick Henry, the World War II Liberty ship SS Patrick Henry and the ballistic missile submarine USS Patrick Henry (SSBN-599).

Camp Patrick Henry was a World War II-era military camp near Newport News, Virginia. Decommissioned in 1946, it became the site of the Newport News/Williamsburg International Airport on 925 acres (3.74 km^{2}). When opened in 1949, the airport was called Patrick Henry Field and was later renamed Patrick Henry International Airport, a name it retained until 1990. The airport code is still PHF.

Patrick Henry has been honored twice on U.S. postage stamps. On October 7, 1955, the United States Post Office Department issued a $1 definitive stamp honoring Henry, one of the high values in the Liberty issue. A painting of Henry by American artist Alonzo Chappel was used as the inspiration and as the model by the engraver for this issue. In 1960–1961, the U.S. Post Office issued the American Credo series, six stamps with well-known patriotic quotations. Patrick Henry's most famous words are inscribed on the final issue in the series, a 4-cent stamp first released in Richmond on January 11, 1961.

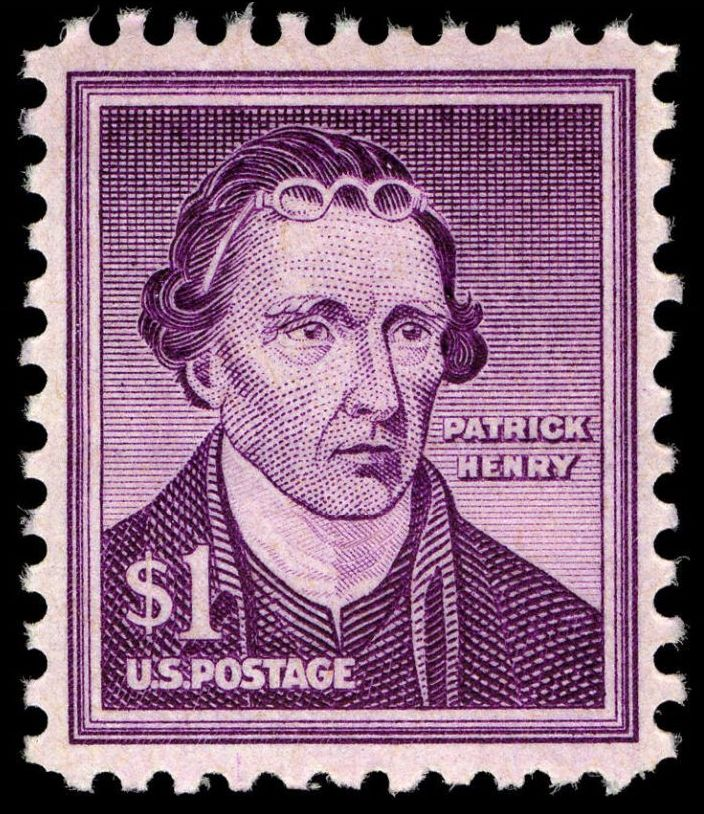
Patrick Henry, Liberty issue, 1955

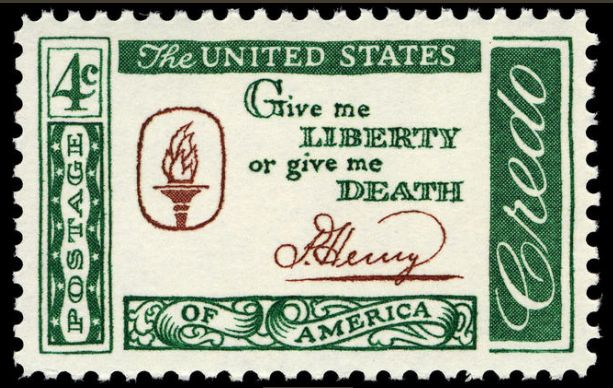
1961 issue honoring Henry in the American Credo series

== Legacy and historical view ==
As historian Richard Beeman put it, Henry was a man who "did not bother to write much of anything down", a handicap when being evaluated by history. The lack of primary source materials regarding Henry—only a handful of papers and a few of his speeches survive—has frustrated Henry's biographers from Wirt (1817) to Beeman (1974). Two years before publishing his book, Wirt commented: "It is all speaking, speaking, speaking. 'Tis true he could talk—Gods! how he could talk! but ... to make the matter worse, from 1763 to 1789 ... not one of his speeches lives in print, writing or memory". Beeman, for his part, concludes, "the Revolutionary firebrand, whatever his achievements, possessed a miserable sense of history". This was a deficiency not possessed by Jefferson, who not only survived Henry by a quarter century, but who got to fill the vacuum of information about Henry with his own recollections and opinions. Wirt did not print many of Jefferson's criticisms of Henry, who had irritated Jefferson to such an extent he was still criticizing Henry to guests at Monticello in 1824. Jefferson's negative assessments of Henry, whether justified or not, have adversely affected Henry's historical reputation.

Henry has always been acclaimed by Americans for the brilliance of his political oratory. Kukla writes, "Henry explained the Revolution to ordinary men and women through America in words they understood—and inspired them to fight for liberty." Mayer argues, "Henry had forged a popular and partisan political style whose democratic implications took another generation to realize fully and accept. His career pointed the transition from the political squirearchy of the eighteenth century to the mass politics of Andrew Jackson's day". In his study of Henry's oratory, David A. McCants suggests that Henry's position as great American orator of his day was not so much because of his "heroism and eloquence" but for adapting the clashing philosophies, religious and political, that met in Henry's Virginia, to create a new style of oratory that appealed to the masses. According to Tate, "by his unmatched oratorical powers, by employing a certain common touch to win the unwavering loyalty of his constituents, and by closely identifying with their interests, he almost certainly contributed to making the Revolution a more widely popular movement than it might otherwise have become". Kidd argues that the historical focus on the quality of Henry's oratory may result from a discomfort with the content of his speeches, especially his opposition to the Constitution.

During the Civil War era, both sides claimed Henry as a partisan, abolitionists citing his writings against slavery, and those sympathetic to the Southern cause pointing to his hostility to the Constitution. That opposition by Henry came to be seen by many writers, even those friendly to Henry, as a blot on an otherwise admirable career. Beeman, writing in 1986, just before the Constitution's bicentennial, predicted that during that anniversary, "it will be hard to avoid depicting Henry as one of history's losers, as one too short-sighted to see beyond the bounds of his own native state to glimpse the promise of national greatness embodied in the federal Constitution."

Henry has been cited as a hero to both Left and Right but has become a particular favorite of the latter. He is especially attractive to Christian conservatives, who cite his deep religious beliefs as well as his writings and speeches in favor of Christian virtue and in defense of religious liberty. Because Henry was educated at home by his father, he has become a symbol of the homeschooling movement. In 2000, Patrick Henry College was founded in Purcellville, Virginia, in large part for those who had been homeschooled. Although Henry's most famous declaration has proved as adaptable as ever in the hands of the Right (one sign at a Tea Party rally in 2010 read "Give Me Liberty or Give Me Debt"), according to Kidd, "few Americans today, Tea Partiers or others, take seriously Henry's fundamental criticisms of the Constitution."

Tate writes of Henry, "Of the numerous leaders who were active largely at the state level and who generally opposed ratification of the Federal Constitution, Henry was one of the few who came to be ranked among the truly major figures of the American Revolution." Kukla concurs, noting that except for two years in the Continental Congress, Henry never held national office, "and yet he was a founder of the republic". Kidd notes the hazy view of Henry that Americans today have:

Henry's memory has taken on a vague, patriotic cast that fails to capture his fractious yet exemplary life. The "real" Henry was branded a traitor and apostate on multiple occasions by his many enemies, including Thomas Jefferson. His vision of the American republic was not a matter of sentiment and grand words and gestures; it was grounded in virtue, religious faith, and responsive local government. Standing against his fellow Founders James Madison and Thomas Jefferson at almost every turn in the 1780s and '90s, and steadfastly opposing the adoption of the Constitution, he was the boldest of patriots.

== See also ==
- History of Virginia
- William H. Roane (grandson)
- William Wirt Henry (grandson)

== Notes ==
=== Bibliography ===
- Beeman, Richard R. (July 1987). "The Democratic Faith of Patrick Henry". The Virginia Magazine of History and Biography. 95 (3): 301–316. ISSN 0042-6636.
- Campbell, Norine Dickson (1969). Patrick Henry: Patriot and Statesman. New York, NY: The Devin-Adair Company. ISBN 9780815965015. OCLC 694997.
- Chernow, Ron (2005). Alexander Hamilton. Penguin.
- Kidd, Thomas S. (2011). Patrick Henry: First Among Patriots. New York, NY: Basic Books. ISBN 978-0-465-00928-2.
- Kukla, Jon (2017). Patrick Henry: Champion of Liberty. New York, NY: Simon & Schuster. ISBN 978-1-4391-9081-4.
- Mayer, Henry (1986). A Son of Thunder: Patrick Henry and the American Republic. New York, NY: Grove Press. ISBN 978-0-8021-3815-6.
- McCants, David A. (1990). Patrick Henry, the Orator. Westport, CT: Greenwood Press. ISBN 978-0-313-26210-4.
- McDonnell, Michael A. (2012). The Politics of War: Race, Class and Conflict in Revolutionary Virginia. Chapel Hill, NC: The University of North Carolina Press. ISBN 978-1-4696-0107-6.
- Meade, Robert D. (1957). Patrick Henry: Patriot in the Making. Philadelphia, PA: Lippincott. OCLC 964630.
- Morgan, Edmund S.; Morgan, Helen M. (1995) [1953]. The Stamp Act Crisis: Prologue to Revolution. Chapel Hill, NC: The University of North Carolina Press. ISBN 978-0-8078-4513-4.
- Raphael, Ray (2004). Founding Myths: Stories that Hide Our Patriotic Past. New York, NY: The New Press. ISBN 978-1-56584-921-1.

Political offices
Preceded by Edmund Pendleton; Acting	Governor of Virginia; 1776–1779	Succeeded by Thomas Jefferson
Preceded by Benjamin Harrison V	Governor of Virginia; 1784–1786	Succeeded by Edmund Randolph
