= Sarah Savage =

English diarist

- Born: Sarah Henry; 7 August 1664; Broad Oak, Flintshire, Wales
- Died: 27 February 1752 (aged 87); West Bromwich, Staffordshire, England
- Occupation: Diarist
- Spouse: John Savage
- Children: 5
- Relatives: Matthew Henry
- Writing career
- Language: English
- Genre: Spiritual literature

Sarah Savage (nee Henry) (7 August 1664 – 27 February 1752) was an English diarist. She started her diary at age 22 and continued a daily diary until her 80s. Her diaries are a resource providing insight into the daily spiritual life of seventeenth and eighteenth century women.

== Life ==
Sarah Henry was born on 7 August 1664 in Broad Oak, Flintshire, Wales to Philip and Katherine Henry. Her father, Philip Henry, was a nonconformist minister. Sarah Henry was the second-oldest of six children. Her brother was Matthew Henry. She was tutored at home and learned to read from William Turner. At age seven her father began teaching her Hebrew.

Sarah Henry started keeping a "Spiritual Diary" starting in August 1686. She married John Savage, a farmer and land agent, on March 28, 1687. Savage had nine children but only four survived to adulthood. Her husband, John Savage, died on 29 September 1729.

In 1736, she retired to West Bromwich. Sarah Savage died on 27 February 1752 at her home in West Bromwich.

== Diary ==
In her diaries, she frequently documented the sermons that she heard and attributed her faith to many aspects of her daily life, including her feared infertility (she would eventually have children), the death of two children, the death of her husband, when she was 65 years old, and her own nearing death at age 87. Through her diary, she also held "conversations" with a close friend who had died, Jane Hunt, constructing dialogues between herself and Hunt based on Hunt's own diaries, letters, and books.

Only fragments of Savage's diary have survived, those portions dating from August 1686 to 1 December 1688 and from 1714 to 1723. The diaries were first published by John Bickerton Williams, a relative of Savage on the Henry side, in 1818 as the Memoirs of the Life and Character of Mrs. Sarah Savage.

== See also ==
- Philip Henry
- Matthew Henry
