= Sarah Winston Syme Henry =

Mother of Patrick Henry (1710–1784)

- Born: Sarah Winston ca. 1710; Hanover County, Virginia Colony
- Died: November 1784 (aged 73–74); Clifford, Virginia Colony
- Other names: Sarah Winston Syme; Sarah Winston Henry
- Spouses: John Syme; John Henry
- Children: William Henry; Patrick Henry; Annie Henry Christian; Elizabeth Henry Campbell Russell

Sarah Winston Syme Henry, the mother of Patrick Henry, was a woman who educated her son and worked for the independence of the Thirteen Colonies.

== Early life ==
Sarah Winston was born about 1710. Her parents, Mary (Dabney) and Isaac Winston, came from families who immigrated in the 1660s to Colonial Virginia. Sarah descended from distinguished Presbyterian families from Yorkshire, England. Isaac immigrated from Wales about 1702, and settled in Hanover County in Colonial Virginia.

== Marriage to John Syme ==
Sarah married John Syme in 1726, becoming Sarah Winston Syme. Having immigrated from Aberdeenshire, Scotland recently, he established himself in Hanover County on a large tobacco plantation of several hundred acres called Studley Farm.

John Henry, who owned 400 acres of uncleared land in the county, joined Syme to help him work the plantation and to learn tobacco-farming methods. He lived and worked there for four years and was the farm manager when Syme was away.

Sarah and John had a son, John Syme, Jr., before John Syme died in 1731. That boy, who inherited the farm upon reaching legal age, would also have a long legislative career, representing Hanover County in the House of Burgesses multiple times beginning in 1761, and last serving a state senator representing Hanover and nearby Caroline Counties in the state senate in 1788. Meanwhile, William Byrd II, who visited Studley Farm in 1732, described the young widow: "A portly, handsome Dame… much less reserved than most of her countrymen… [which] became her well and set off her other agreeable qualities to good advantage."

== Marriage to John Henry ==
Sarah Winston Syme married John Henry in 1732, becoming Sarah Winston Syme Henry. The Henry family was "more respected for their good sense and superior education than for their riches", as a cousin, David Henry, wrote in The Country Gentleman. An immigrant from Aberdeenshire, Scotland, John was the son of Alexander Henry and Jean Robertson Henry. He was known as a man of good character and moderate means. The newly married couple lived on Studley Farm with Henry's baby, John Syme, Jr. who inherited the farm from his father and would own it when he came of age.

Sarah and John had children of their own, including William, Patrick, and daughters, Jane, Sarah, Susanna, Mary, Anne, Elizabeth, and Lucy. Native Americans camped near the plantation and William developed an interest in Native Americans' way of life and lore. He stayed there for weeks at a time, where he hunted and fished. Patrick, who was named after his uncle, a rector of Saint Paul's Anglican Church in Virginia. William and Patrick attended a private school near their home. Patrick attended until the age of ten when he did not have an interest in the subjects at school and resented the severe beatings that boys received from their instructors. The girls learned domestic skills at home.

Henry was a "woman of recognized mental power and an unusual command of language." Her brother William was considered one of the great orators of the colony. Her husband, John Henry had studied Latin, Greek, geography, ancient and modern history, philosophy, mathematics, and theology at King's College in Scotland. He received a liberal education and was well grounded in the classics. John Henry opened a school for his boys and neighborhood children, which improved their level of education that they received and brought in extra income for the family. John was appointed by the Virginia General Assembly to be a justice of the peace, a seat he held for many years. He was a Colonel of the militia and a surveyor. He made a map of Virginia, which was published in 1770 in England.

Even though Henry was a dissenter, she took her children to her brother-in-law's church and was particularly interested in the "well-prepared" sermons of George Whitefield, a leader of the Great Awakening movement, when he visited the church. Also a dissenter, her father held services by "unlicensed preachers" in his house, for which he was fined £300 by the General Court of Colonia Virginia. Henry also took her children to hear the sermons of Samuel Davies when he preached to Presbyterians in Hanover County, which her brother-in-law did not condone. Patrick particularly enjoyed the sermons, later adopting Davies' style. After the church services, Henry questioned her son about the sermons, to help him think through the key points. As a result, he improved his skills at thinking deeply about a subject and organizing his thoughts. It also taught him to speak clearly. Davies also introduced topics that encouraged Patrick to further his studies.

When John Syme, Jr. came of age, he took over management of Studley Farm and made it a horse farm. The Henrys then moved to a plantation called Mount Brilliant, in the Piedmont area of Virginia. Patrick married Sarah Shelton. He studied law and received his law license. Patrick became a delegate to the Second Virginia Convention (1775) in Richmond, where he said in a speech, "I know not what course others may take, but for me, give me liberty or give me death!". William became a planter.

== Death ==
John Henry died at Mount Brilliant in February 1773 or 1775. He is generally believed to have been buried at the Mount Brilliant cemetery. Their daughter Jane married Col. Samuel Meredith and after John's death, Henry lived with them.

Sarah Winton Syme Henry died at the home of her son-in-law Col. Samuel Meredith in November 1784 (Note: Waldrup states that Henry died in 1783.) at Winton and is buried at the cemetery there. Winton is now the Winton Golf Course Manor House. A historical marker on Patrick Henry Highway (Virginia Route 151), across the street from St. Peter's Baptist Church, in Clifford, Virginia commemorates the location of her grave. It was erected in 1932 by the Conservation & Development Commission.

After she died, Samuel said of her in a letter to Patrick: "She has been in my family upward of 11 years, and from the beginning to the end of that time, it most evidently appeared to me that it was one continued sense of piety and devotion, guided by such a share of good sense as rendered her amiable and agreeable to all who were so happy as to be acquainted with her."

== Legacy ==
When women sought the right to vote in the United States, a descendant of Sarah Winston Henry wrote to politician Hon. James Thomas Heflin in Washington, D.C.,

Dear Sir: My mother asks me to send her congratulations to you for your attitude on the votes-for-women proposition. As the oldest living descendant of the mother of Patrick Henry, Sarah Winston Henry, who gave three sons to the cause of the Revolution and who never heard of sex emancipation and would not have listened to it, she has the right to express an opinion on matters concerning her country's welfare. Mother says that you struck the nail most squarely on the head when you said that many of the suffragettes were the products of unhappy homes.

— Jean Cabell O'Neil

== Sources ==
- Waldrup, Carole Chandler (2004). More Colonial women : 25 pioneers of early America. Jefferson, N.C. : McFarland & Co. ISBN 978-0-7864-1839-8.
