= Edmund Winston =

Virginia judge and politician

The Honorable Edmund Winston

Judge of the General Court of Virginia
- In office December 11, 1788 – February 6, 1813
- Preceded by: Peter Lyons
- Succeeded by: John Dabney

Member of the Virginia Senate
- In office 1782–1783
- Succeeded by: Charles Lynch
- Constituency: Bedford, Campbell, Henry, and Pittsylvania Counties
- In office 1777–1781
- Constituency: Bedford, Henry, and Pittsylvania Counties
- In office 1776–1776
- Constituency: Bedford and Pittsylvania Counties

Personal details
- Born: 1745 Hanover County, Virginia, British America
- Died: August 18, 1818 (aged 72–73) Lynchburg, Virginia, U.S.
- Spouse(s): Alice Taylor (m. 1771; died 1784); Dorothea Dandridge (m. 1802)
- Children: 6
- Occupation: Lawyer, politician, judge
- Profession: Law

Edmund Winston Sr. (1745 – August 18, 1818) was a lawyer, politician, jurist, and patriot who represented south central Virginia in the Virginia Senate (1776-1783) then became a judge of the general court of Virginia (now the Virginia Supreme Court).

== Early life and education ==
Winston was born in 1745 in Hanover County, Virginia, the son of Lt. William Winston and Sarah Dabney. In 1704 his grandfather had sailed to the Virginia Colony from Yorkshire, England with his young family. Several sons (now this man's uncles) had settled further south in the colony, including Judge Anthony Winston of Buckingham County, whose daughter this man would marry, as discussed below. Edmund was his father's only son, and had two sisters.

== Career ==
Winston moved westward along the James River as a young man and settled near Lynchburg, where he became a planter in several nearby counties, as well as owned a wharf named for his family. Winston also was admitted to the Virginia bar in 1767 and supported the American Revolution, furnishing supplies in support of the cause of independence. He was a first cousin of patriot firebrand and later Virginia governor Patrick Henry, who after his governmental service became a planter in Charlotte County, Virginia at its border with what became Campbell County, which as discussed below, Winston represented in the Virginia Senate, before (as also discussed below) becoming Henry's executor and marrying his widow.

Meanwhile, voters from then-large Bedford and Pittsylvania Counties elected Winston as their representative in the Senate of Virginia in 1776, and he continued to win-re-election and serve until 1783, when he was replaced by Charles Lynch. However, Winston was not seated in the new legislature's first session because the Bedford County clerk had not been sworn, and the names of the counties in his district increased with the creation of Henry and later Campbell from Pittsylvania and Bedford Counties.

By 1781, Thomas Jefferson recorded in his book, Notes on the State of Virginia, that lead from western Virginia was loaded on the boats at "Lynch's ferry, or Winston's, on [the] James River." In the 1787 Virginia tax census, Winston (or his son of the same name) was listed as non-resident and non-titheable but the owner of on five enslaved teenagers and six enslaved adults in Bedford County, as well as two horses and nine cattle. He was taxed on eleven enslaved teenagers as well as six adult slaves, seven horses and sixteen cattle in Campbell County, and eleven teenage slaves, eight adult slaves, nine horses and twelve cattle in Henry County. Because his court sat in Richmond, the new Commonwealth's capital city, he may also be the "Edmd. Wilson" listed on the Richmond census, as related to George Winston whose paid the city tax for him as well as eight teenage slaves, three enslaved adults and a horse.

Winston served as Commonwealth attorney in Campbell County during 1787-88. He and Campbell County clerk Robert Alexander became the county's representatives to the Virginia Ratifying Convention of 1788, which ultimately ratified the U. S. Constitution, although Winston, like his cousin Patrick Henry and fellow delegate Alexander, voted against ratification.

In 1788, Winston was elected by the Virginia General Assembly to the General Court of Virginia, which heard appeals from the county courts, and served in the role until 1813. During his first two weeks on the bench, from December 11 to December 24 of 1788, he was also an ex officio member of the Supreme Court of Virginia until it became a separate body with five judges.

Winston was a friend of Thomas Jefferson, and, according to the Jefferson Papers, visited him at Monticello on multiple occasions.

== Family and children ==
In October 1771, Winston married his cousin Alice Taylor Winston, a daughter of his uncle, Judge (and former burgess) Anthony Winston, of downriver Buckingham County. They had six children, George Dabney, Sarah, Alice, Mary, Edmund Jr., and Elizabeth. Alice died in 1784, leaving him with six children ages 1–10. Their daughter Sarah married George Cabell, prominent surgeon and builder of Point of Honor, a manor house now owned by the city of Lynchburg. Their son Edmund Winston Jr. lived in Amherst County, Virginia outside Lynchburg and married Caroline Jordan.

This Edmund Winston was a first cousin and long-time friend of Governor Patrick Henry, who appointed him as an executor of his will. After Henry's death in 1799, Winston was active in the settlement of the Red Hill estate and various tracts of land. This process involved frequent communication with Henry’s widow, Dorothea Dandridge Henry.

In June 1802, Winston married Dorothea in Charlotte County. Dorothea bore no additional children with Winston, but he helped support her children from Patrick Henry (including Edward Winston Henry 1794-1866), as well as Henry's and Winston's children from earlier wives. In total, they had 21 children in their blended family; many of whom were adults at the time of this late marriage. They lived at the Huntingtour Estate in Buckingham County.

== Death ==
Winston died on August 18, 1818, in Lynchburg, Virginia.

== See also ==
- List of justices of the Supreme Court of Virginia
