= Dorothea Dandridge Henry =

First Lady of Virginia, wife of Patrick Henry

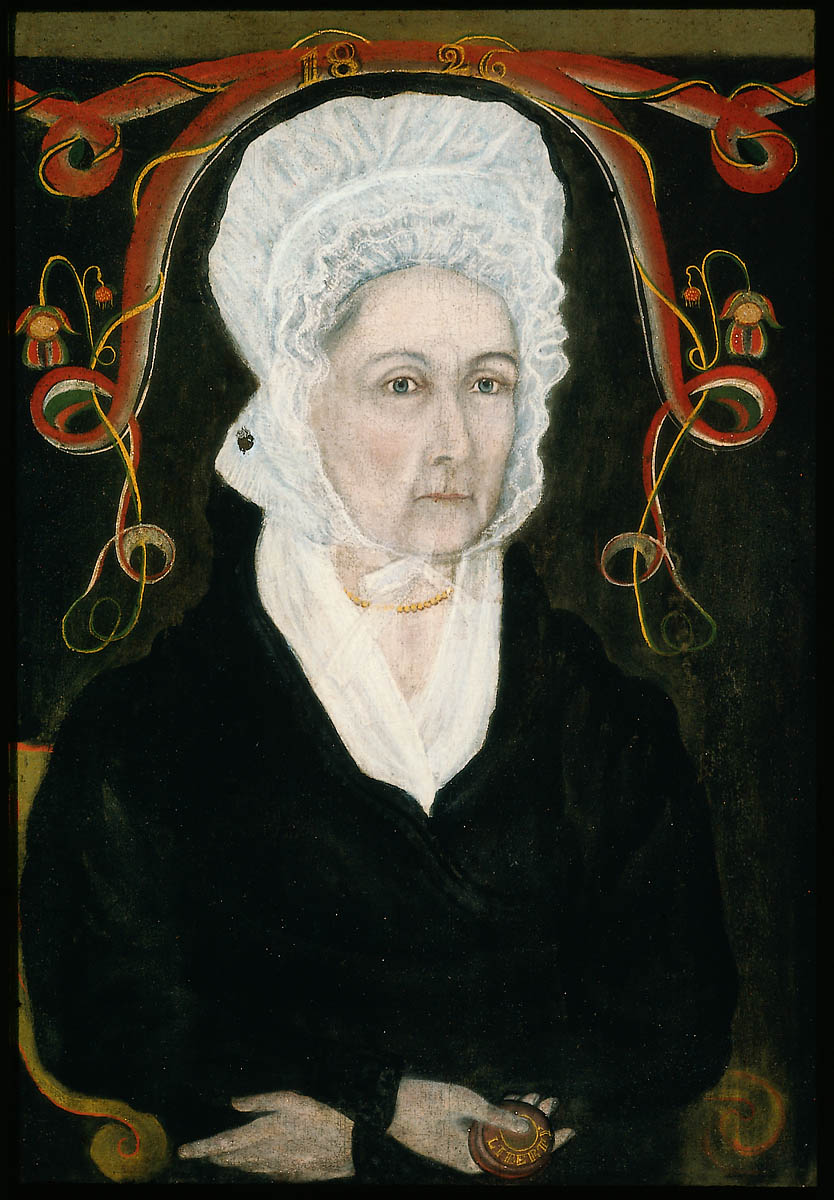

First Lady of Virginia
- In role December 1, 1784 – December 1, 1786
- Governor: Patrick Henry
- Preceded by: Elizabeth Harrison
- Succeeded by: Elizabeth Randolph
- In role October 19, 1777 – June 1, 1779
- Governor: Patrick Henry
- Preceded by: Position Established
- Succeeded by: Martha Jefferson

Personal details
- Born: September 25, 1757 Hanover, Virginia, British America
- Died: February 14, 1831 (aged 73) Seven Islands, Halifax County, Virginia, U.S.
- Resting place: Red Hill Patrick Henry National Memorial
- Spouses: Patrick Henry (m. 1777; died 1799) Edmund Winston (m. 1802)
- Children: 11 children 12 step-children

Dorothea Henry (née Dandridge; September 25, 1757 – February 14, 1831) was the wife of Patrick Henry. Upon their marriage while he was in office, she served as the first and sixth First Lady of Virginia during Henry's terms as governor, from 1777 to 1779 and 1784 to 1786.

== Early life and education ==
Born in 1757, Dorothea was the daughter of Nathaniel West Dandridge and Dorothea Spotswood. She was a cousin of Martha Dandridge Washington, wife of George Washington.

Dorothea had a prominent family background. Her maternal grandfather served as Lieutenant Governor and Acting Governor of the Colony of Virginia, Alexander Spotswood. Her paternal grandfather was a British Navy Commander, Captain William Dandridge. Her paternal great-grandmother, Lady Unity West, was a great-granddaughter of Thomas West, 3rd Baron De La Warr, for whom Delaware Bay, the Delaware River, and the State of Delaware were named.

== First lady of Virginia ==
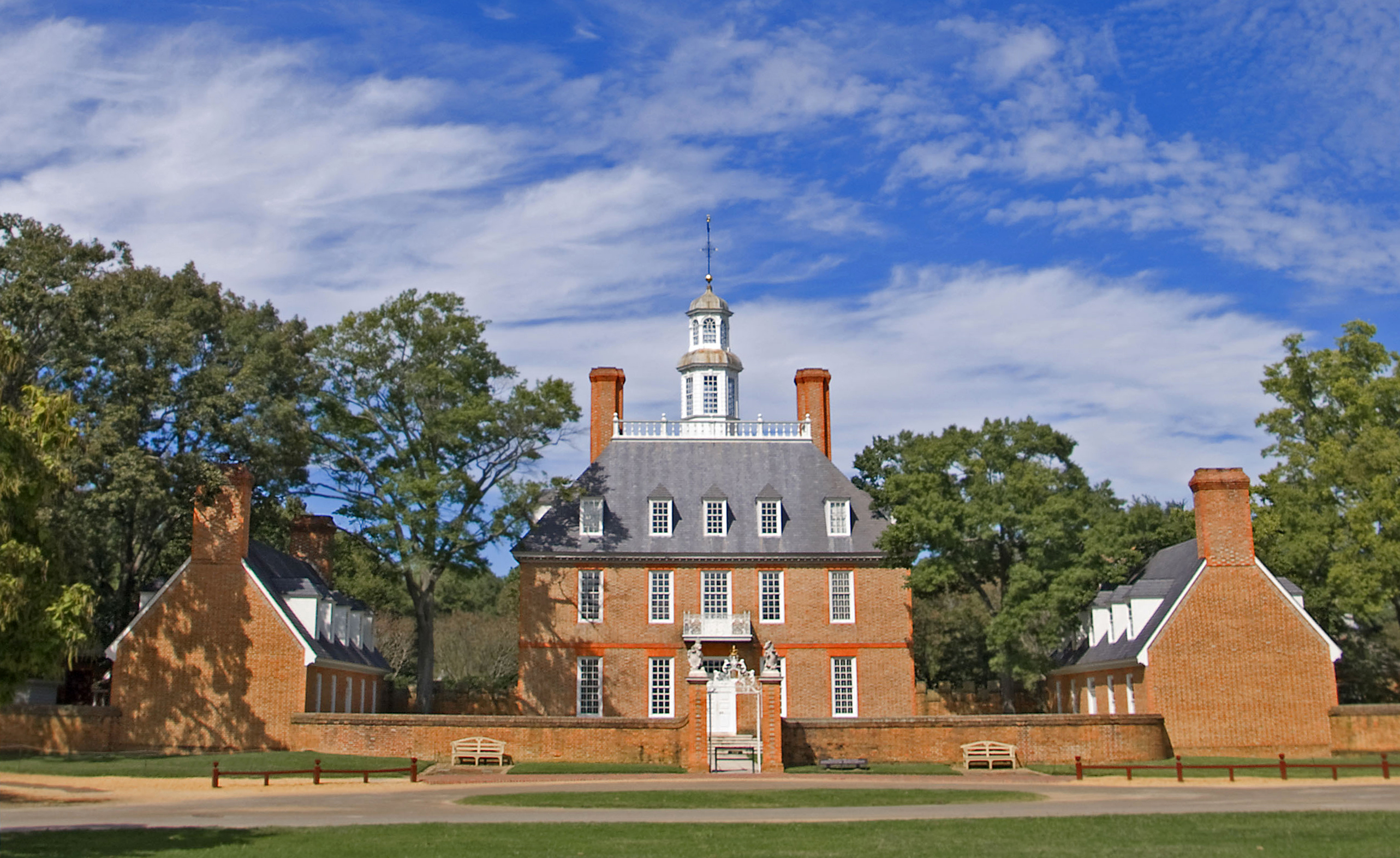
Governor's Palace, Governor Henry's residence in Williamsburg

Upon her marriage to the sitting governor, Patrick Henry, 20-year-old Dorothea became the inaugural First Lady of Virginia from 1777 to 1779, during the American Revolution. The marriage was regarded as a wise match that helped solidify support for Henry in the Commonwealth, especially given that Dorothea belonged to an old and prominent Virginia family.

Mrs. Henry lived with her husband at the Governor's Palace in Williamsburg, Virginia. With the support of her cousin, Martha Washington, Mrs. Henry helped raise funds and support for the Virginia militia. Dorothea has been described as serving in the role of First Lady with grace and tact.

After Henry's first term as governor, they resided at the Leatherwood Plantation in Henry County, Virginia from 1779 to 1784. In 1784, Henry returned to the governor's office, and they moved to the new capitol of Richmond, Virginia.

In 1794, they retired to the Red Hill plantation and estate, comprising nearly 3,000 acres in Charlotte County.

== Marriages and children ==
Dorothea married Patrick Henry on October 9, 1777, at the age of 20 at Fork Church. They had 11 children, but only 9 lived to adulthood. Combined with the 6 children from Patrick's first marriage to Sarah Shelton, they raised a total of 15 children. After Patrick Henry's death in 1799, Dorothea married Judge Edmund Winston in 1802. He was a first cousin of Henry and had been an executor of his estate.

In his will, Henry gave his wife Dorothea his Red Hill estate along with 20 slaves of her choosing. He also gave her permission to free one or two of them if she desired. By 1805, she had freed at least five through manumission.

Combined with Winston's 6 children with his late wife, they had 21 children in their blended family, many of whom were adults at the time of their marriage.

=== Death and legacy ===
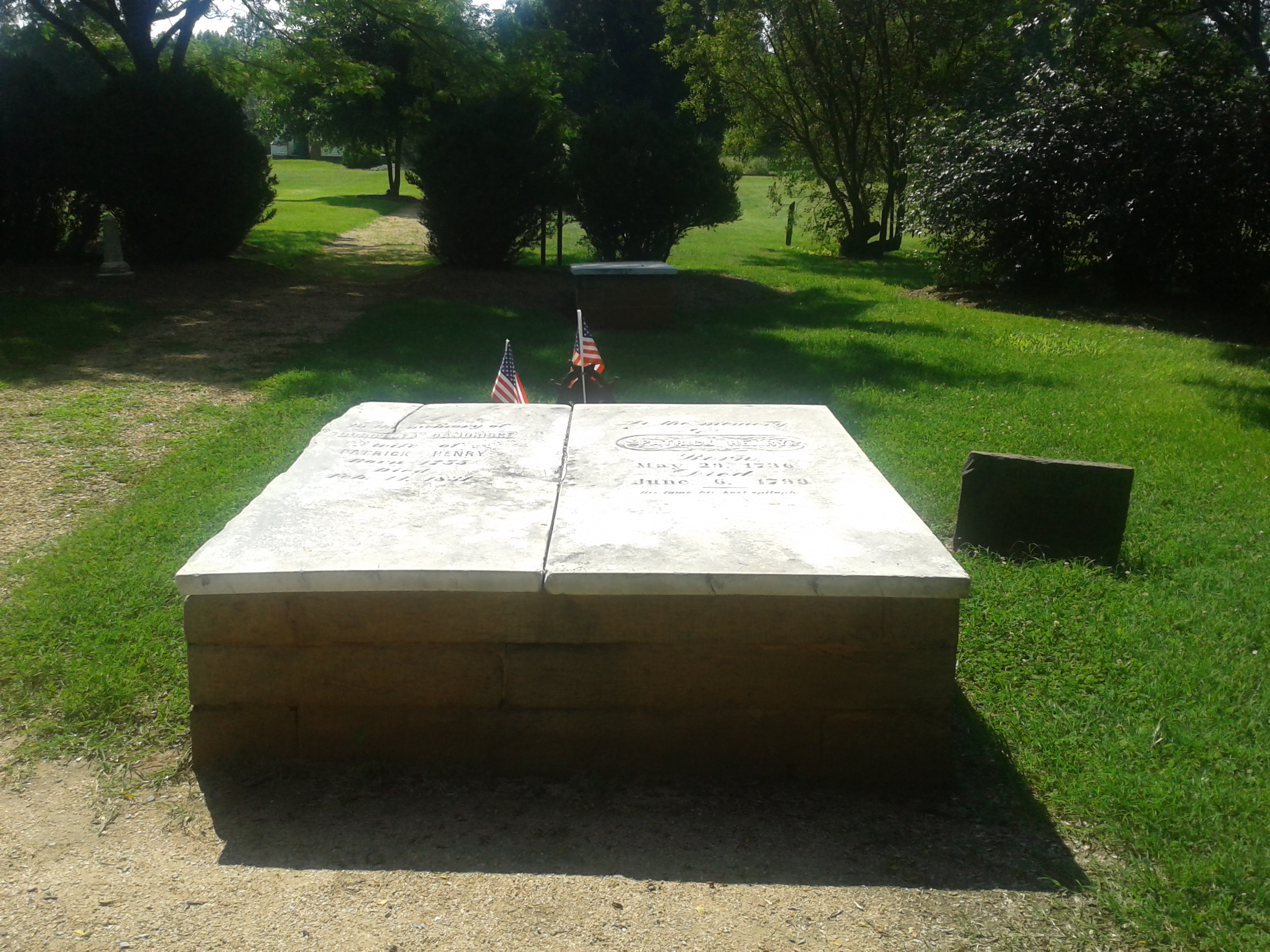
Dorothea Henry's grave at the Red Hill Patrick Henry National Memorial

Dorothea died in 1831 at her daughter's home at Seven Islands plantation in Halifax County, Virginia at the age of 75. She was buried at Red Hill next to her first husband. The Dorothea Henry Chapter of the Virginia Daughters of the American Revolution is named in her honor.
