= Scotchtown (plantation) =

Historic house in Virginia, United States

- Patrick Henry's Scotchtown
- U.S. National Register of Historic Places
- U.S. National Historic Landmark
- Virginia Landmarks Register
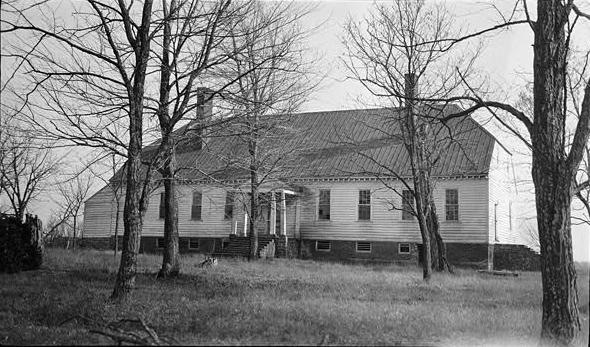
- Scotchtown Plantation

- Location within Virginia Location within the United States
- Location: 10 mi. NW of Ashland on VA 685, Ashland, Virginia
- Coordinates: 37°50′39.7″N 77°35′4.4″W
- Area: 41 acres (170,000 m^{2})
- Built: after 1717, expanded ca. 1760s
- Architectural style: Georgian/first period colonial
- Website: preservationvirginia.org/historic-sites/patrick-henrys-scotchtown
- NRHP reference No.: 66000835
- VLR No.: 042-0030

Significant dates
- Added to NRHP: October 15, 1966
- Designated NHL: December 21, 1965
- Designated VLR: September 9, 1969

Scotchtown is a plantation located in Hanover County, Virginia, that from 1771 to 1778 was owned and used as a residence by U.S. Founding Father Patrick Henry, his wife Sarah and their children. He was a revolutionary and elected in 1778 as the first Governor of Virginia. The house is located in Beaverdam, Virginia, 10 miles (16 km) northwest of Ashland, Virginia on VA 685. The house, at 93 feet (28 m) by 35 feet (11 m), is one of the largest 18th-century homes to survive in the Americas. In its present configuration, it has eight substantial rooms on the first floor surrounding a central passage, with a full attic above and English basement with windows below. It was designated a National Historic Landmark in 1965.

The house is owned and managed by Preservation Virginia, which operates a number of other historic properties across the Commonwealth, including the John Marshall House, the Old Cape Henry Lighthouse, Bacon's Castle, and Historic Jamestowne.

== History ==
The Scotchtown property was given as a land grant to Charles Chiswell, a prominent planter and iron mine owner, in 1717. Chiswell built a small house on the property, probably in the 1720s. It was expanded to its present size around 1760. It was first given the name "Scotch Town" in a 1757 deed of sale. At this time the house also was used as a store that bought and sold local tobacco.

Patrick Henry purchased the house in 1771 and lived there with his wife, Sarah Shelton Henry, and their six children. This was his home during his most influential period, including his famous "Give me liberty or give me death!" speech at St. John's Episcopal Church in Richmond, Virginia. It was also his residence when he was elected Governor of Virginia in 1776. His wife Sarah, who suffered from mental illness, died at the site in 1775. He resided at Scotchtown until 1777. That year he married his second wife and in 1778 they relocated, after his election, to the Governor's Palace in Williamsburg.

The house was purchased by the Wilson Miles Cary family after their original home had been taken over as a small-pox rest camp. They briefly resided there until attempting to sell it in December 1781. The house and land were transferred to Benjamin Forsythe in Hanover County's 1787 tax records, but Cary is charged once more in 1792. An ad in a 1794 Richmond paper announces, "Scotch-Town Grammar School will be conducted the present year by Peter and Thomas Nelson. Peter Nelson, Rector, St. Martin's, Hanover".

Beginning in 1801, the property was owned by John M. Sheppard-Taylor. Little is known about the Sheppard-Taylor family, other than the changes they made to the appearance of the house over the generations. Sheppard divided the land between his children, leaving his daughters Lavinia and Sally Taylor the house and a few acres. The house was abandoned after the death of Sally Taylor, until Hanover circuit court Judge Leon M. Bazile ordered the house to be auctioned. The house was sold to Preservation Virginia (formerly known as the Association for the Preservation of Virginia Antiquities) in 1958.

Scotchtown was long believed to have been the girlhood home of Dolley Madison, wife of president James Madison, who was distantly related to Patrick Henry. But, there is little evidence beyond Madison's own recollections of the house as a child to support this fact. Dolley Madison's recollections may have been memories of visits to the house during her childhood.

== Preservation ==
The property was sold at auction in July 1958, when it was purchased by Preservation Virginia for $37,000. Extensive archaeological work has taken place in the decades following. A number of projects have restored the house to its late 18th-century appearance, including rebuilding outbuildings such as the icehouse, kitchen, and law office.

Scotchtown was declared a National Historic Landmark in 1965 as an unusual 18th-century structure associated with a Founding Father. The property received a grant from the Institute of Museum and Library Services in 1993 to "reexamine its policies, procedures, and the current condition of its collection and structures," including restructuring its programming. It is currently open for visitors seasonally or by appointment.

== See also ==
- List of National Historic Landmarks in Virginia
- National Register of Historic Places listings in Hanover County, Virginia
- Birthplace of Patrick Henry
- Pine Slash
- Leatherwood Plantation
- Red Hill Patrick Henry National Memorial
