= Birthplace of Patrick Henry =

Archaeological site in Virginia, United States

- Patrick Henry's Birthplace Archeological Site
- U.S. National Register of Historic Places
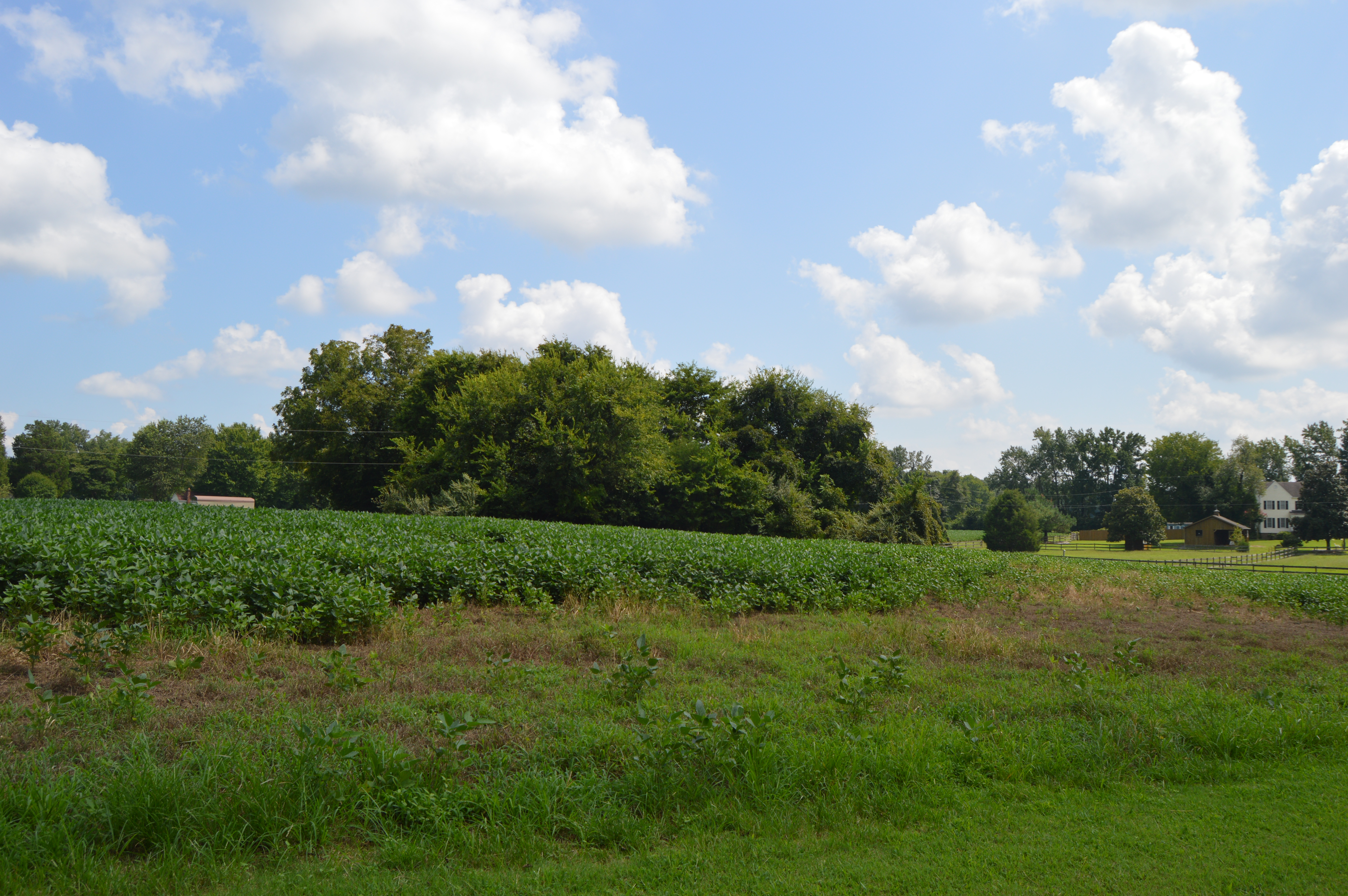
- Overview of the site

- Location within Virginia Location within the United States
- Nearest city: Studley, Virginia
- Coordinates: 37.669113°N 77.290977°W
- Area: 6 acres (2.4 ha)
- Built by: John Symes
- NRHP reference No.: 82001819
- Added to NRHP: August 2, 1982

The Birthplace of Patrick Henry (1736–1799), the Founding Father and American statesman from Virginia, was a farmhouse called "Studley", located in what is now the village of Studley in Hanover County, Virginia. The house, a two-story brick structure, was built in the 1720s by John Symes, whose wife Sarah married Patrick Henry's father John after Symes died. Patrick Henry was born in the house on May 29, 1736. By 1796 the farmstead included a significant number of outbuildings. The house was destroyed by fire in 1807, and now only archaeological remnants remain.

There is an interpretive plaque near the site at 9620 Studley Farms Drive. The site was listed on the National Register of Historic Places in 1982.

== See also ==
- National Register of Historic Places listings in Hanover County, Virginia
- Pine Slash
- Scotchtown plantation
- Leatherwood Plantation
- Red Hill Patrick Henry National Memorial
