= Red Hill Patrick Henry National Memorial =

1000 acres in Virginia (US), affiliated area of the National Park Service

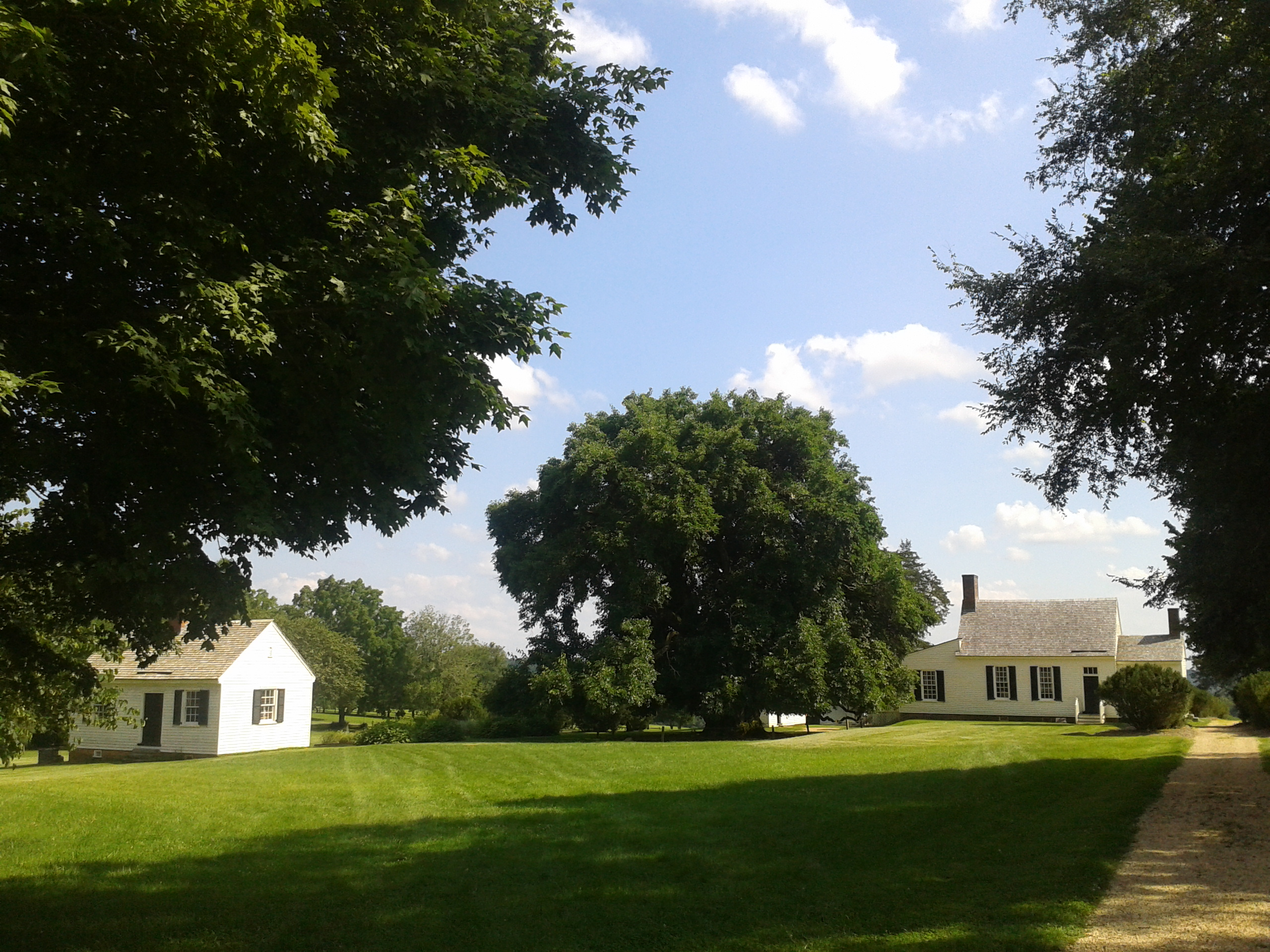
- Red Hill, 2016

- Location within the United States
- Location: Charlotte County, Virginia, United States
- Nearest city: Lynchburg, Virginia
- Coordinates: 37°1′56″N 78°53′53″W
- Area: 1,000 acres (400 ha)
- Designation: U.S. National Memorial
- Authorized: 99th U.S. Congress
- Established: May 13, 1986; 40 years ago
- Governing body: Patrick Henry Memorial Foundation
- Website: Red Hill
- Red Hill
- U.S. National Register of Historic Places
- U.S. National Memorial
- Virginia Landmarks Register
- Location within Virginia Location within the United States
- Nearest city: Lynchburg, Virginia
- Area: 1,000 acres (400 ha)
- Architect: Stanhope Johnson
- Architectural style: Colonial
- Restored: 1950s and 1960s
- Restored by: Patrick Henry Memorial Foundation
- Website: Red Hill
- NRHP reference No.: 78003012
- VLR No.: 019-0027

Significant dates
- Added to NRHP: February 14, 1978
- Designated VLR: September 18, 1973

Red Hill Patrick Henry National Memorial, also known as Patrick Henry's Red Hill, in Charlotte County, Virginia, near the Town of Brookneal, is the final home and burial place of Founding Father Patrick Henry, legislator and orator of the American Revolution. Henry bought Red Hill Plantation at his retirement in 1794 and occupied it with his wife, Dorothea, and their children until 1799, the year of his death. In addition to the main house, Henry used another building as his law office. There were also dependencies and slave quarters on the working 2,930-acre tobacco plantation. The plantation was located on the Staunton River for transportation.

== Creation and maintenance of the memorial ==
Congress authorized the establishment of a Patrick Henry National Monument on August 15, 1935 (49 Stat. 652) pending the acquisition of the property by the Secretary of the Interior. The purchase never occurred, and the enabling legislation was repealed on December 21, 1944 (58 Stat. 852).

The site was taken over by the Patrick Henry Memorial Foundation, established in 1944, which in the 1950s and 1960s restored Henry's law office and preserved his grave onsite. It also reconstructed his last home and several dependencies. A new museum was built to provide for interpretation of his life and place in 1976.

Red Hill Plantation was listed on the National Register of Historic Places on February 14, 1978. The national memorial was authorized by the United States Congress on May 12, 1986 (100 Stat. 429). Owned by the Patrick Henry Memorial Foundation, Red Hill is operated as a house museum and is an affiliated area of the National Park Service, meaning that the Foundation can request certain assistance from the NPS in preserving and interpreting the site.

Planning in the 2000s for the site included a master plan to guide improvements. The first project, supported by 2006 grant money, made improvements and additions of walking trails to help visitors understand transportation and plantation agriculture. It related the site to 18th century bateaux trade and transportation along the river, its ferry site, and the later addition of a 19th-century "railroad flag stop."

In 2018, the Foundation acquired a stretch of land known as the "Quarter Place" which housed the enslaved and later free Black populations at Red Hill. The Quarter Place is home to one of the largest intact cemeteries for the enslaved in Virginia, holding the remains of 147 persons.

Currently, the Patrick Henry Memorial Foundation cares for about 1,000 acres of Henry's original land.

== Collections ==
Red Hill houses the largest collection of Patrick Henry artifacts in the United States, including documents, furniture, personal items, and decorative arts. In total, the museum houses approximately 3,000 objects related to Patrick Henry and the history of Red Hill.

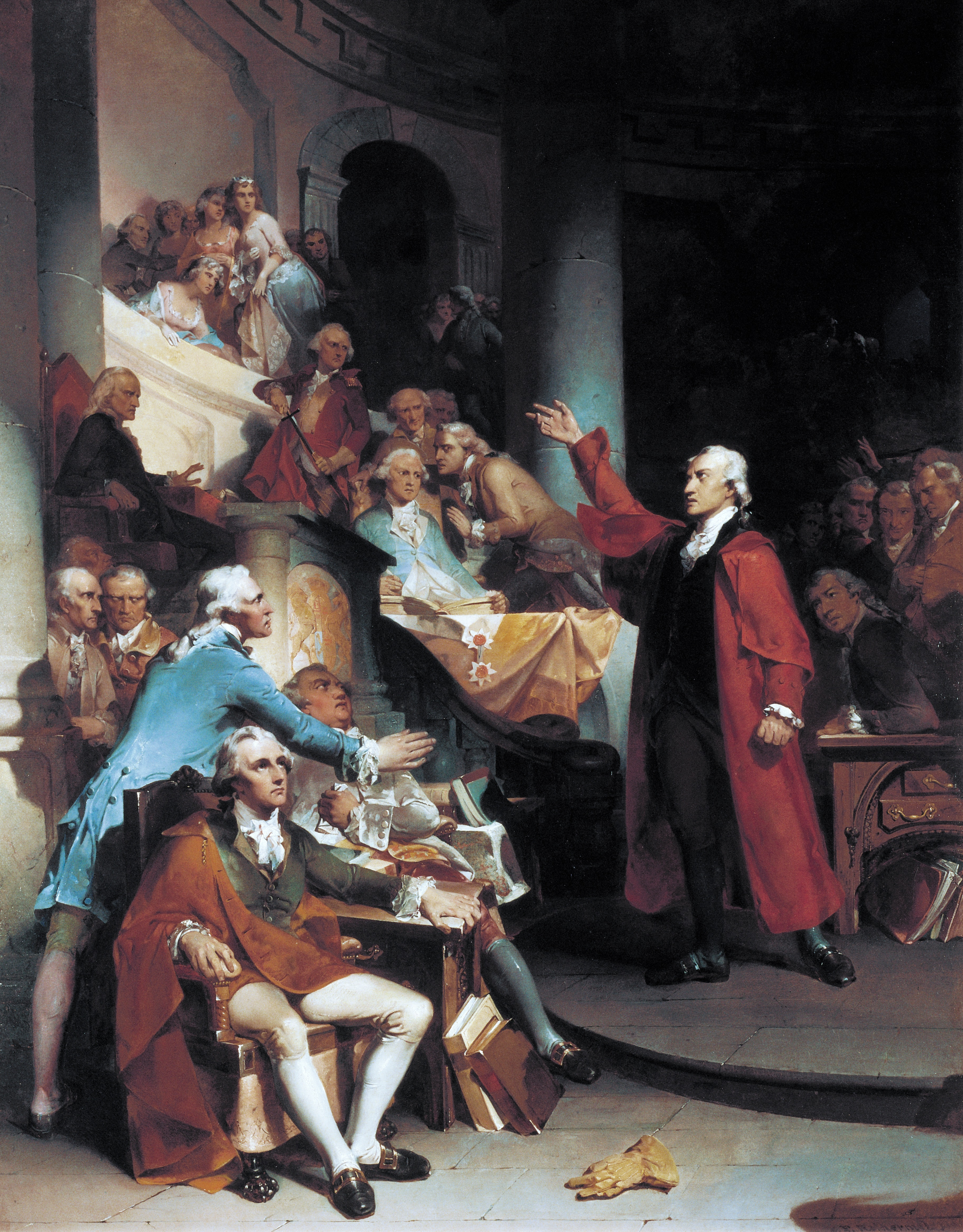
Patrick Henry Before the Virginia House of Burgesses (1851) by Peter F. Rothermel is on display at Red Hill.

The centerpiece of the collection is Peter F. Rothermel's landmark painting, Patrick Henry Before the Virginia House of Burgesses, painted in 1851. The painting was donated to the Patrick Henry Memorial Foundation in 1959 and is on display in a permanent exhibition. Other important artifacts include the paper cutter held by Henry while delivering his "Give me liberty or give me death!" speech, and the last letter Henry wrote.

== Gallery ==
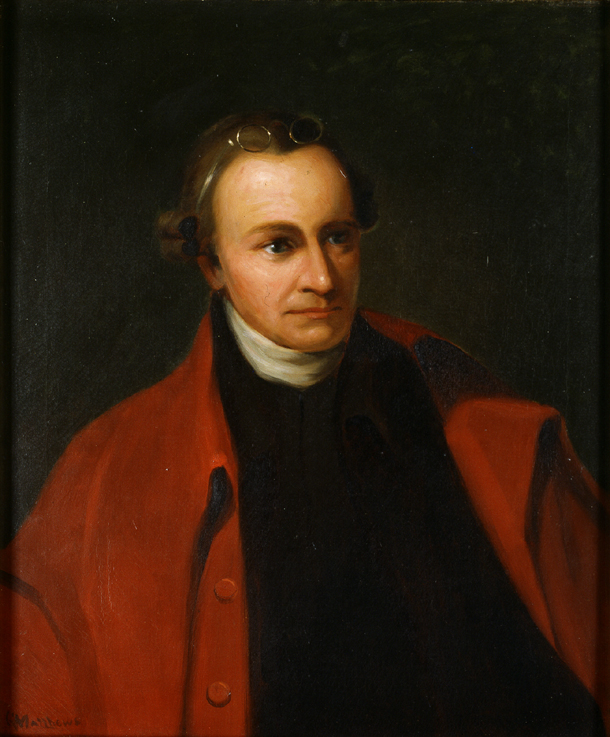
Patrick Henry by George Bagby Matthews, c. 1891.

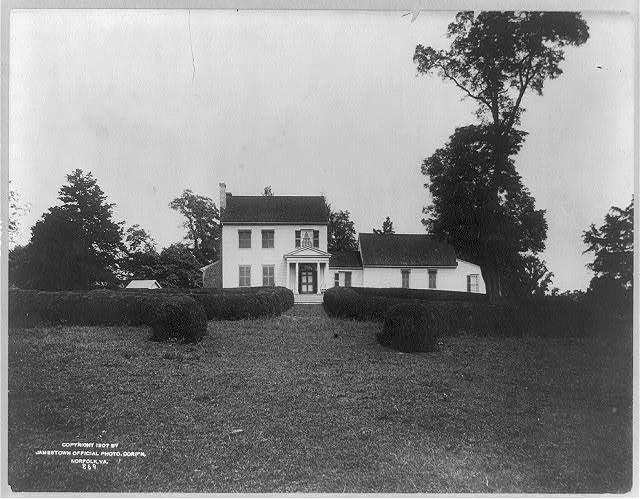
Red Hill main house, c. 1907

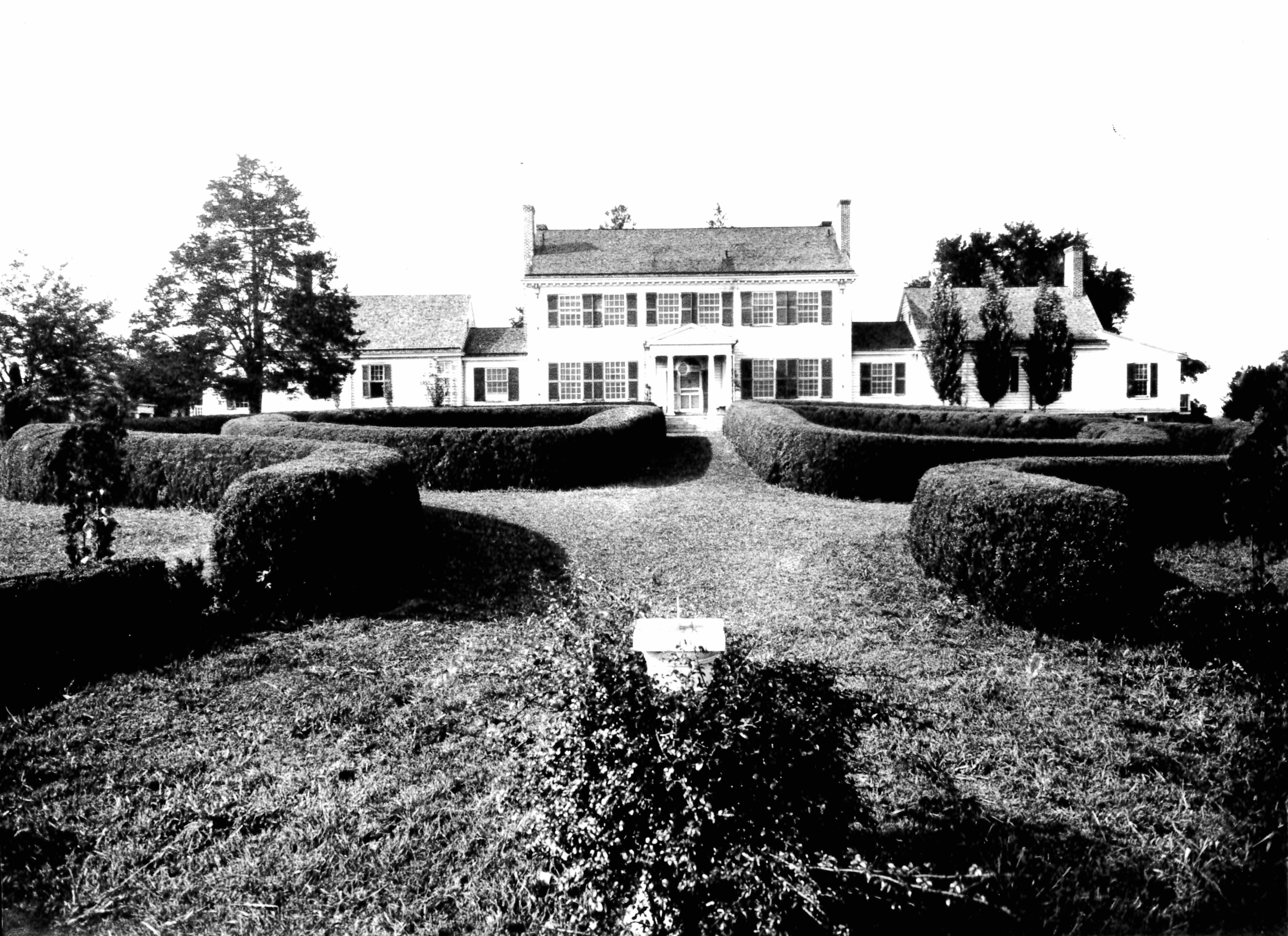
The Red Hill mansion prior to burning down, 1912

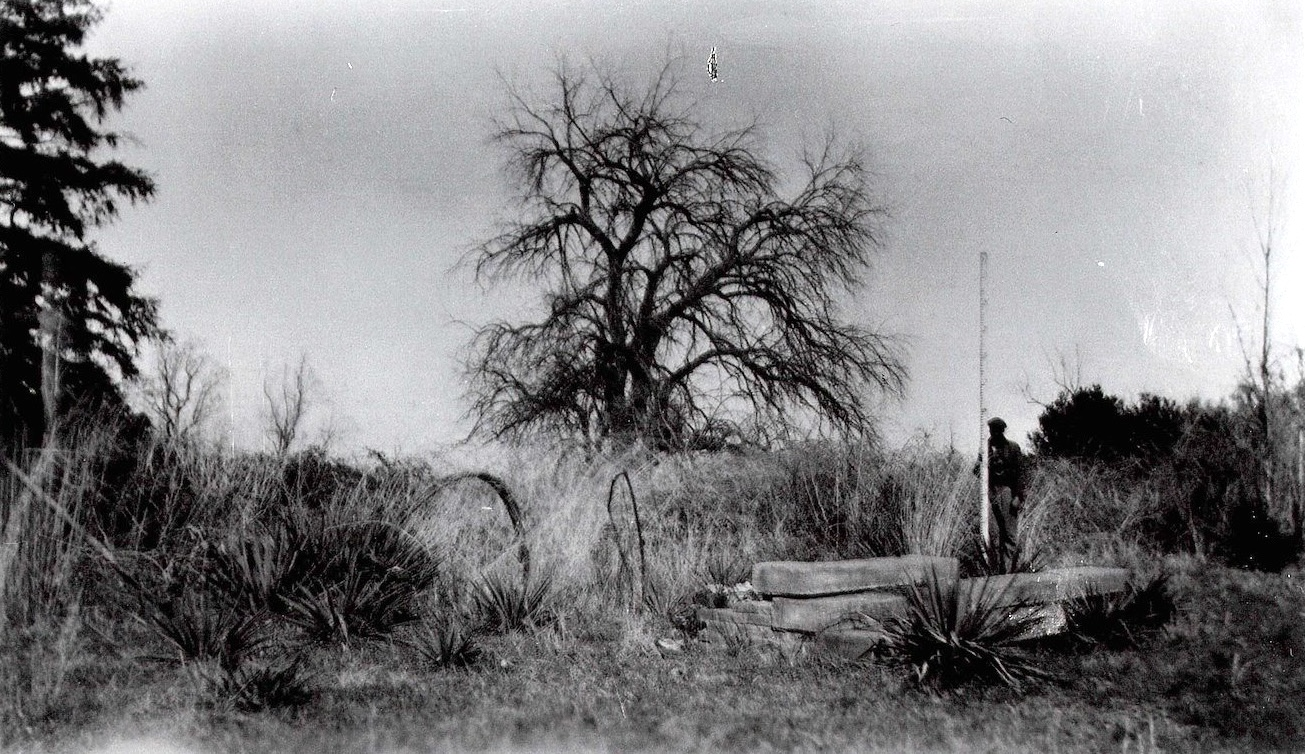
Ruins of the Red Hill mansion, 1936

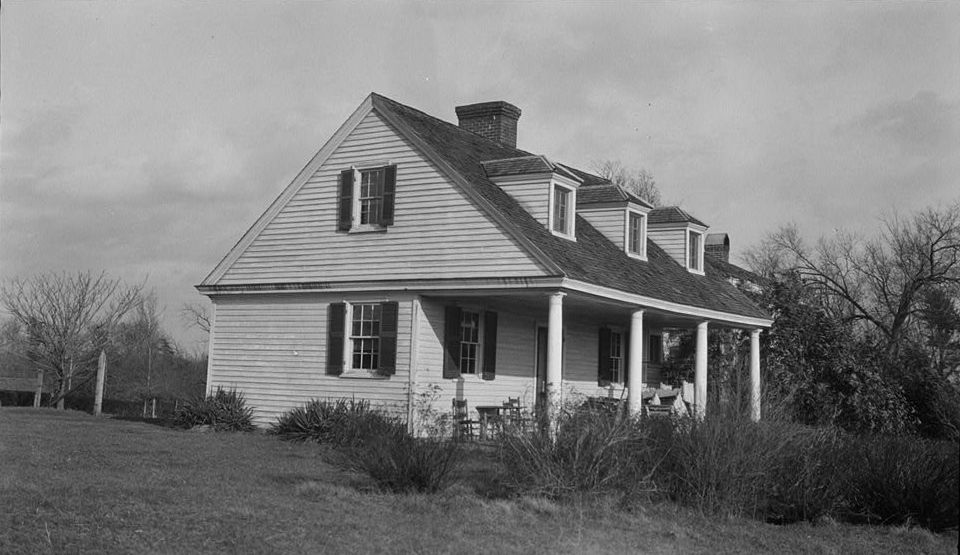
Law office of Patrick Henry at Red Hill, 1950

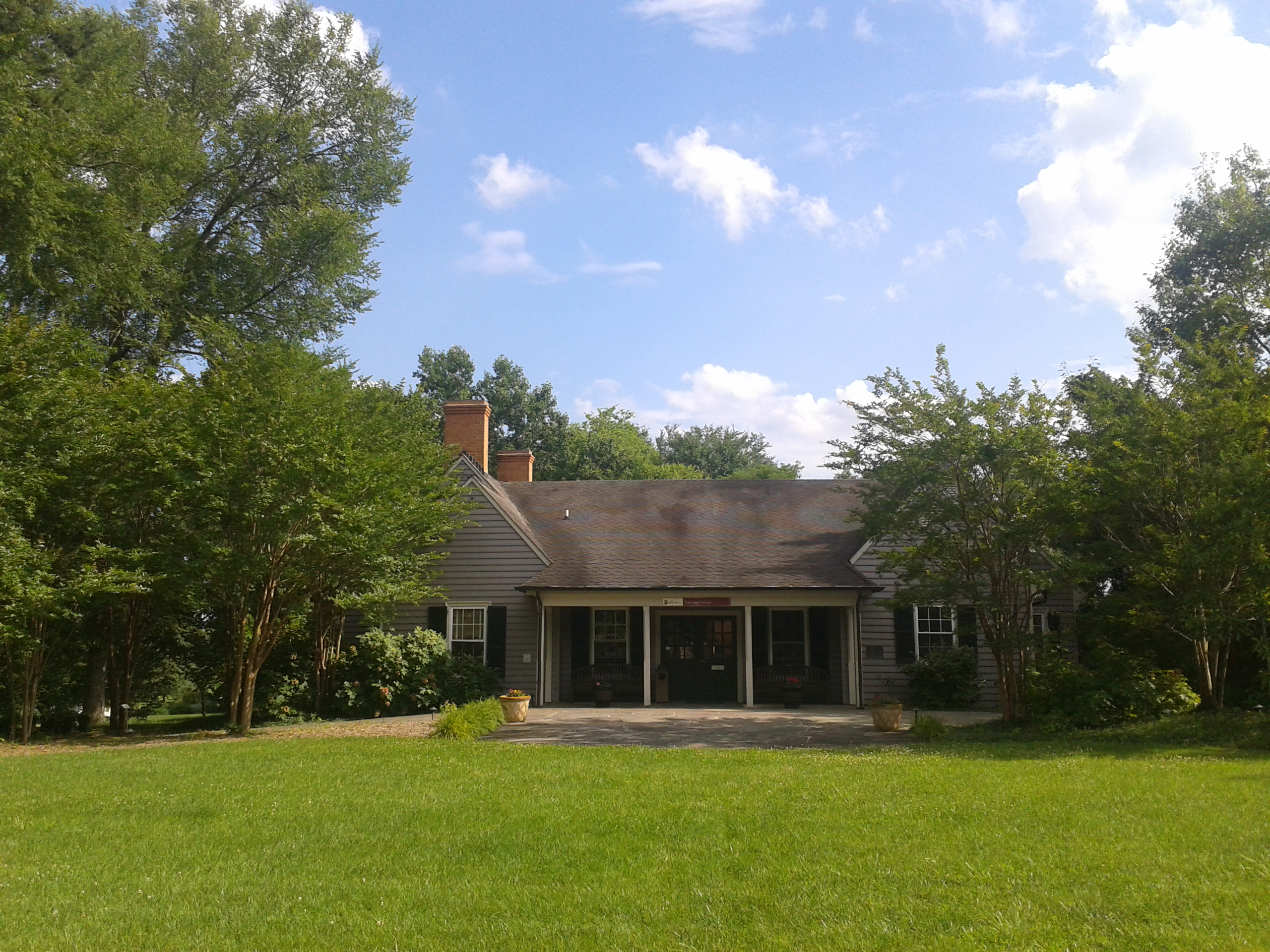
Red Hill Visitor Center

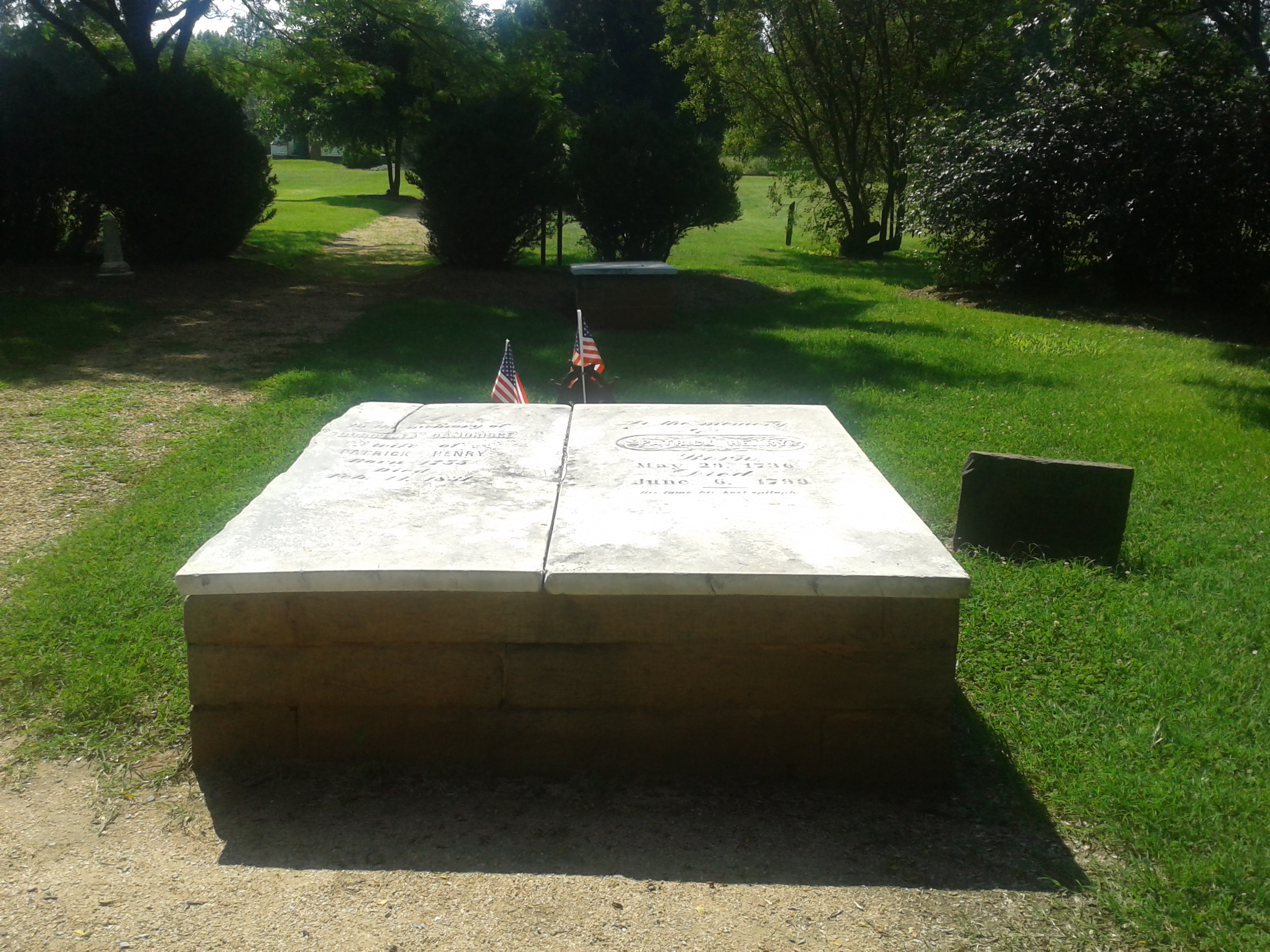
Patrick and Dorothea Henry's graves

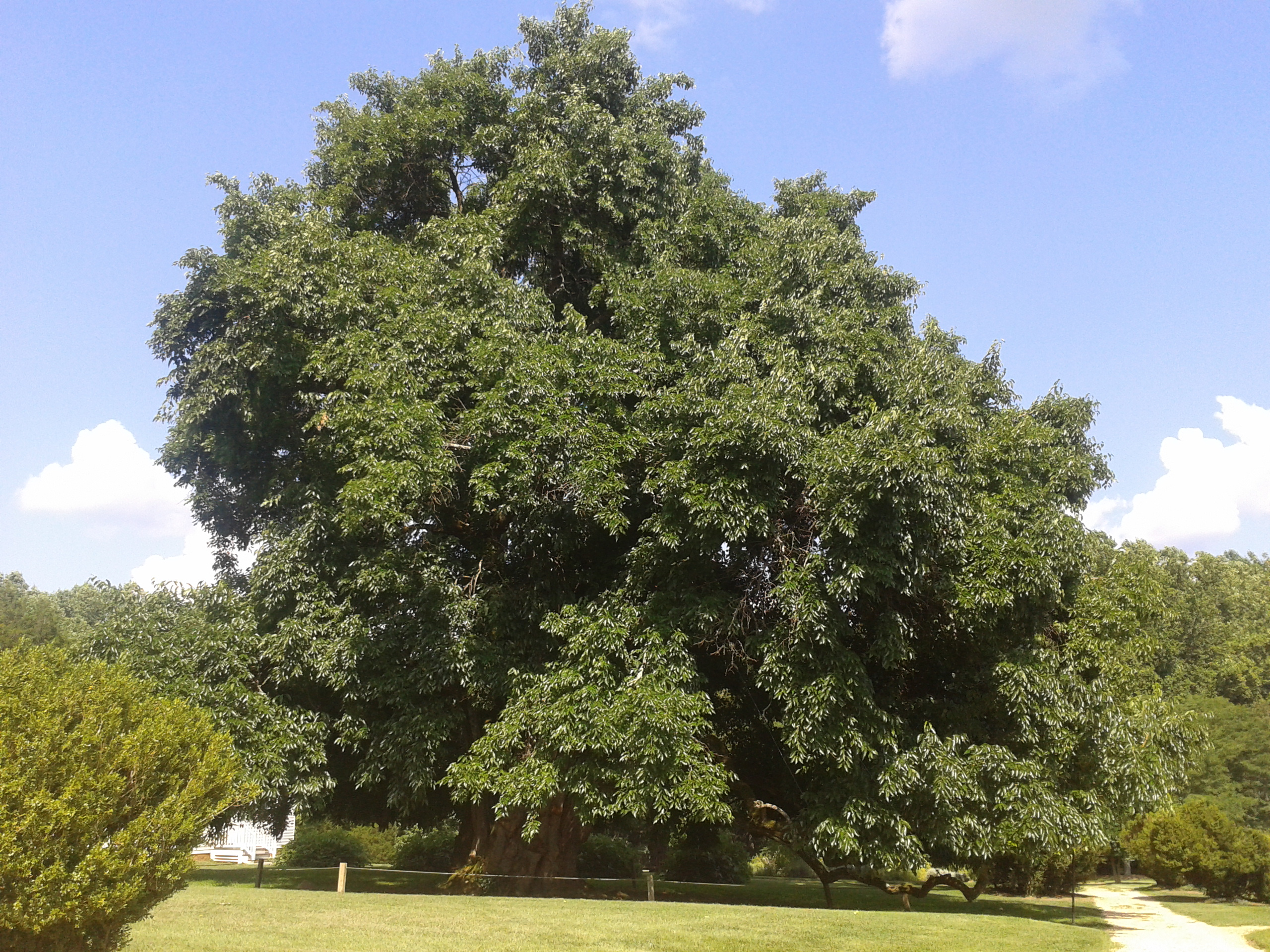
The National Champion Osage Orange tree, over 350 years old.

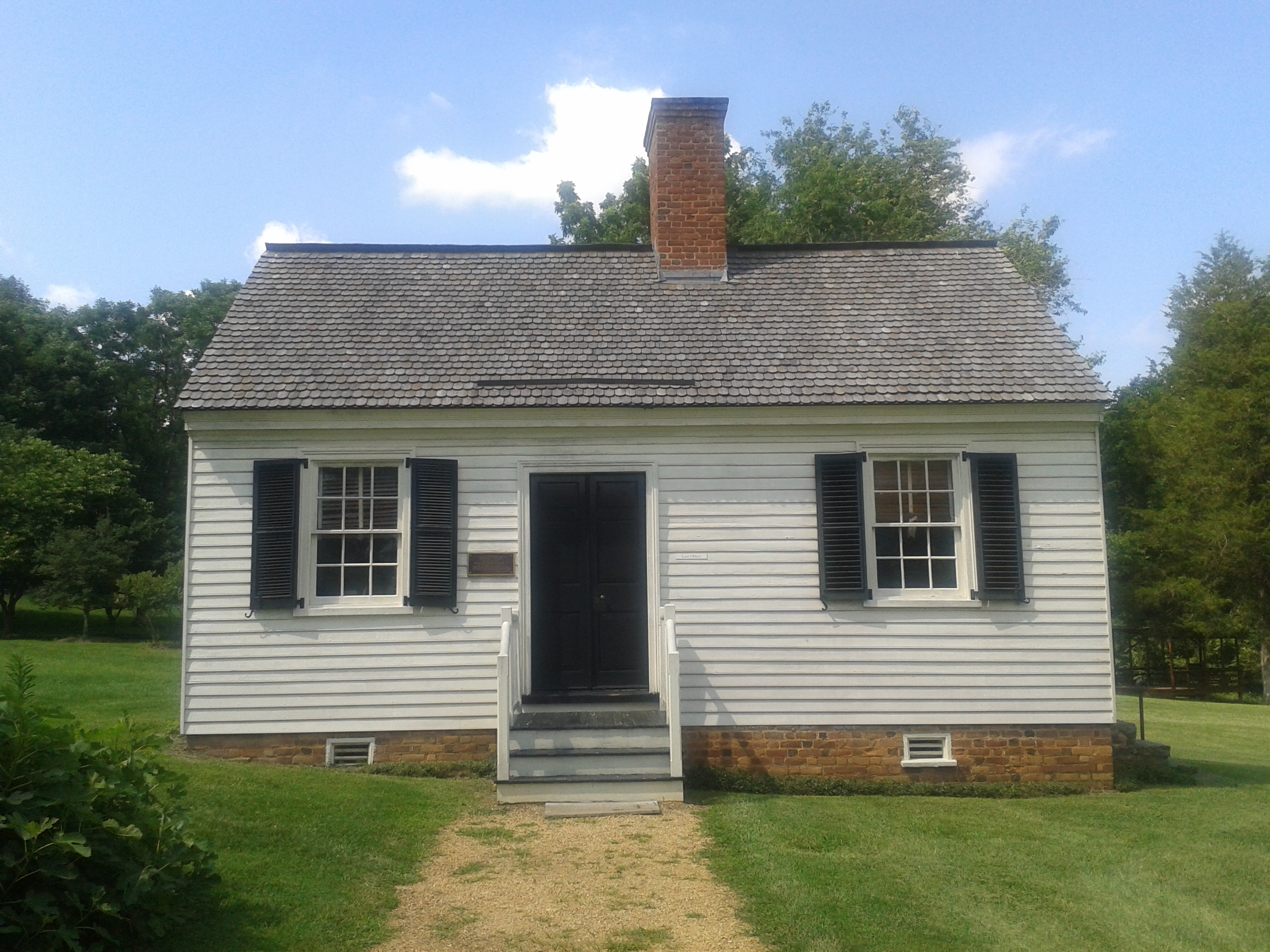
Patrick Henry's restored law office.

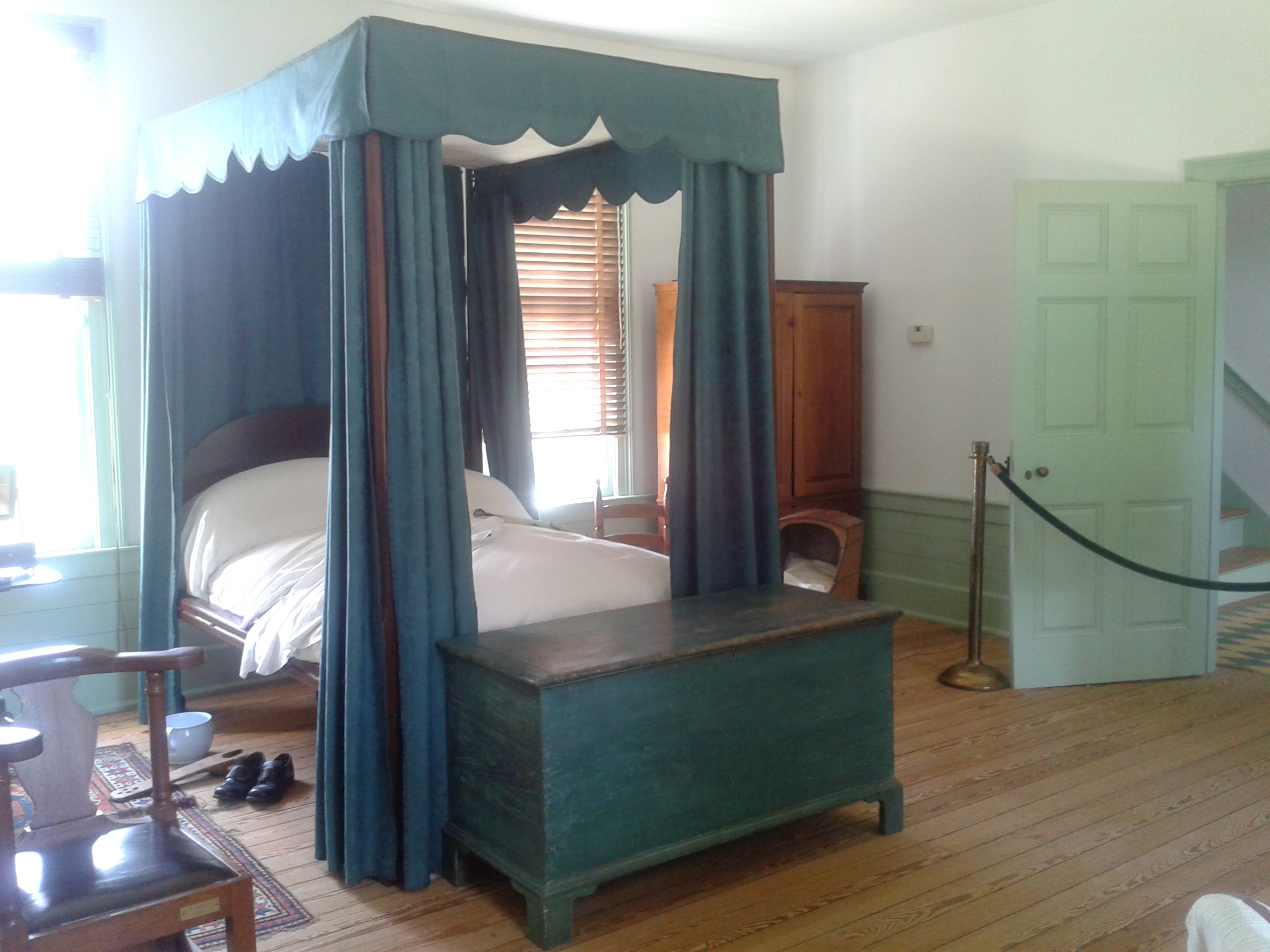
Interior of the Patrick Henry House

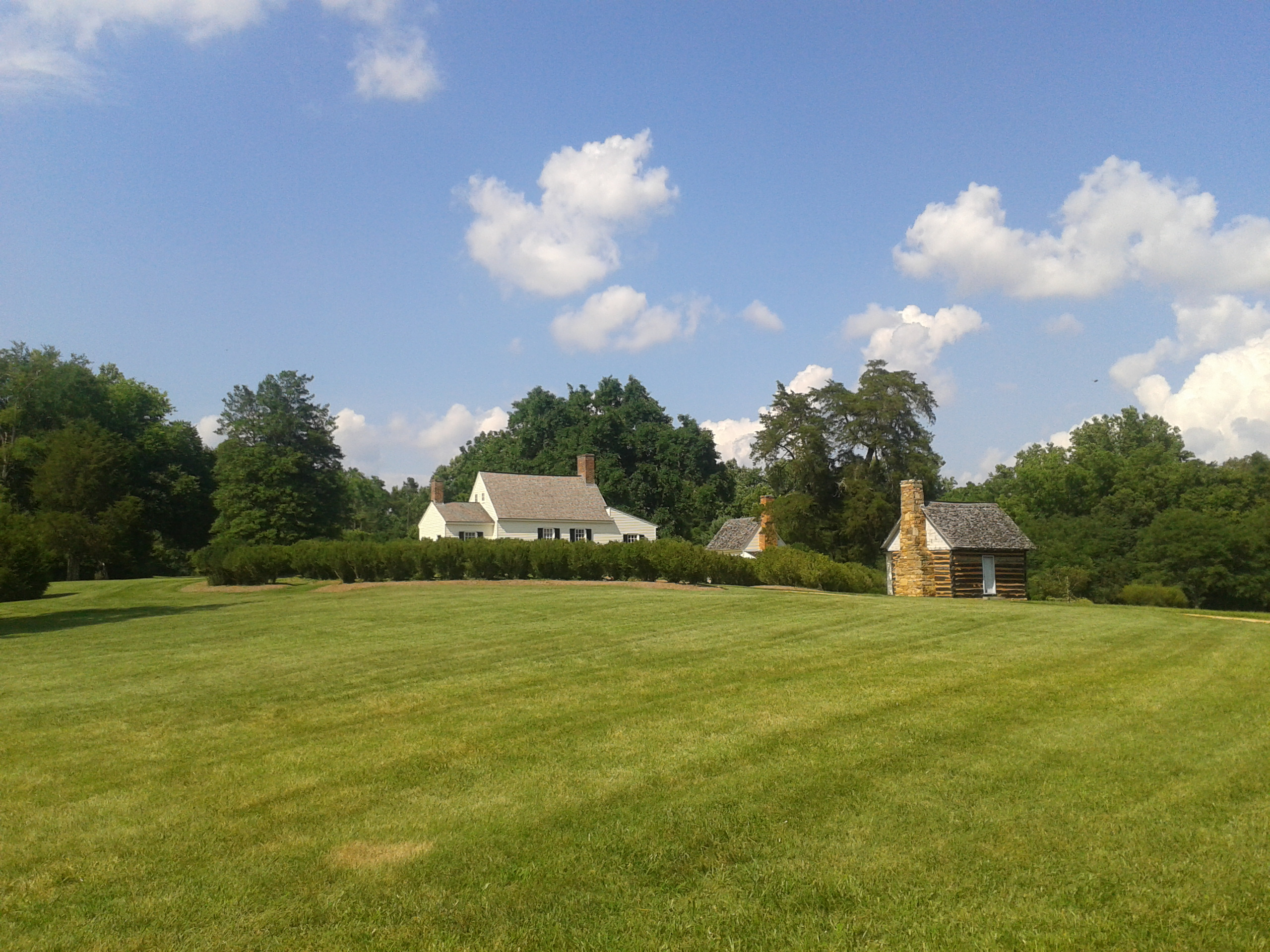
View of the historic grounds looking north.

== See also ==
- Birthplace of Patrick Henry
- Pine Slash
- Scotchtown plantation
- Leatherwood Plantation
- List of national memorials of the United States
