= Robert Alexander (Virginia patriot) =

American politician

Member of the Virginia Ratifying Convention for Campbell County
- In office June 2, 1788 – June 26, 1788 Serving with Edmund Winston

Personal details
- Born: Robert Alexander; November 1746 Augusta County, Colony of Virginia
- Died: December 1820 (aged 74) Campbell County, Virginia
- Party: Anti-Federalist
- Spouse: Anne Austin
- Children: 2 sons, 8 daughters
- Profession: clerk, planter, politician

Robert Alexander (November 1746 – December 1820) was a Virginia patriot and planter who served as the first clerk of court for newly established Campbell County, Virginia, as well as represented it in the Virginia Ratifying Convention .

== Early and family life ==
Born in then-vast Augusta County, to Esther Alexander and her schoolmaster husband Robert, who had immigrated from Ulster to the Pennsylvania colony in 1737, then nine years later moved his young family south to the Shenandoah Valley of Virginia, where he established a school that became a predecessor of what became in this man's lifetime Washington College, and is now Washington and Lee University. The family included five additional brothers and four sisters.

Alexander married Anne Austin in March 1774. She may have inherited land in what became Campbell County in this man's lifetime (as discussed below), and definitely bore two sons who survived to adulthood, as well as eight daughters.

== Career ==
Having learned to read and write under his father's tutelage, Alexander on January 25, 1773, became deputy to the clerk of the court of Bedford County (which had been formed in 1753 and would be subject to several boundary changes before 1786). When relations with Britain grew tense, Alexander became clerk to Bedford County's Committee of Safety when it was formed on May 23, 1775. On May 26, 1778, Alexander accepted a commission as lieutenant of the Bedford County militia, and he was promoted to captain on June 29, 1779. Although he never went on active duty during the Revolutionary War, he was called Captain Alexander for the rest of his life.

In 1781, the Virginia General Assembly split Bedford County and created Campbell County. When the new county's justices of the peace first met, they selected Alexander as the county clerk, a position he retained until his death, when he was succeeded by his son John, who had been appointed clerk of the Superior Court of Law in Campbell County in 1809.

In March 1788, Campbell county voters elected Alexander and lawyer Edmund Winston to represent them at the Virginia Ratifying Convention. He was so unknown outside his region (and unrelated to the Alexander family of the Northern Neck of Virginia, one of the First Families of Virginia) that Richmond newspapers incorrectly identified him as "John Alexander." He also took no recorded part in the debates, but voted for amendments before ratification, then voted (unsuccessfully) to reject the new federal Constitution without them.

Alexander prospered from the fees he earned as the county clerk and as administrator of estates, and by 1782 owned 565 acres of land in Bedford County and by 1789 acquired almost 1750 acres in Campbell County. In the 1787 Virginia tax census, he (or possibly a relative with the same name) was identified as both non-tithable and non-resident in Bedford County, but as owning three enslaved teenagers, two adult slaves, three horses and seventeen cattle there. In Campbell County "Ro. Alexander" paid taxes on six enslaved teenager as well as four adults, five horses, 21 cattle and a two-wheeled carriage. When Alexander wrote his will in 1814, he owned a thousand-acre plantation and eighteen slaves. His house, known as "Rock Castle", was one of the largest in Campbell County, and later was the home of Confederate general and U.S. Senator Robert E. Withers, but his Rustburg home near the courthouse burned long before the 20th century began.

== Death and legacy ==
Alexander died between the adjournment of the Franklin county court session on November 17, 1820, and the next session which began on December 11. According to historian Brent Tarter, several colorful anecdotes about early Campbell County featured Alexander, who often carried a large musket and was prone to wild behavior when drunk.
