= Totomoi =

- U.S. National Register of Historic Places
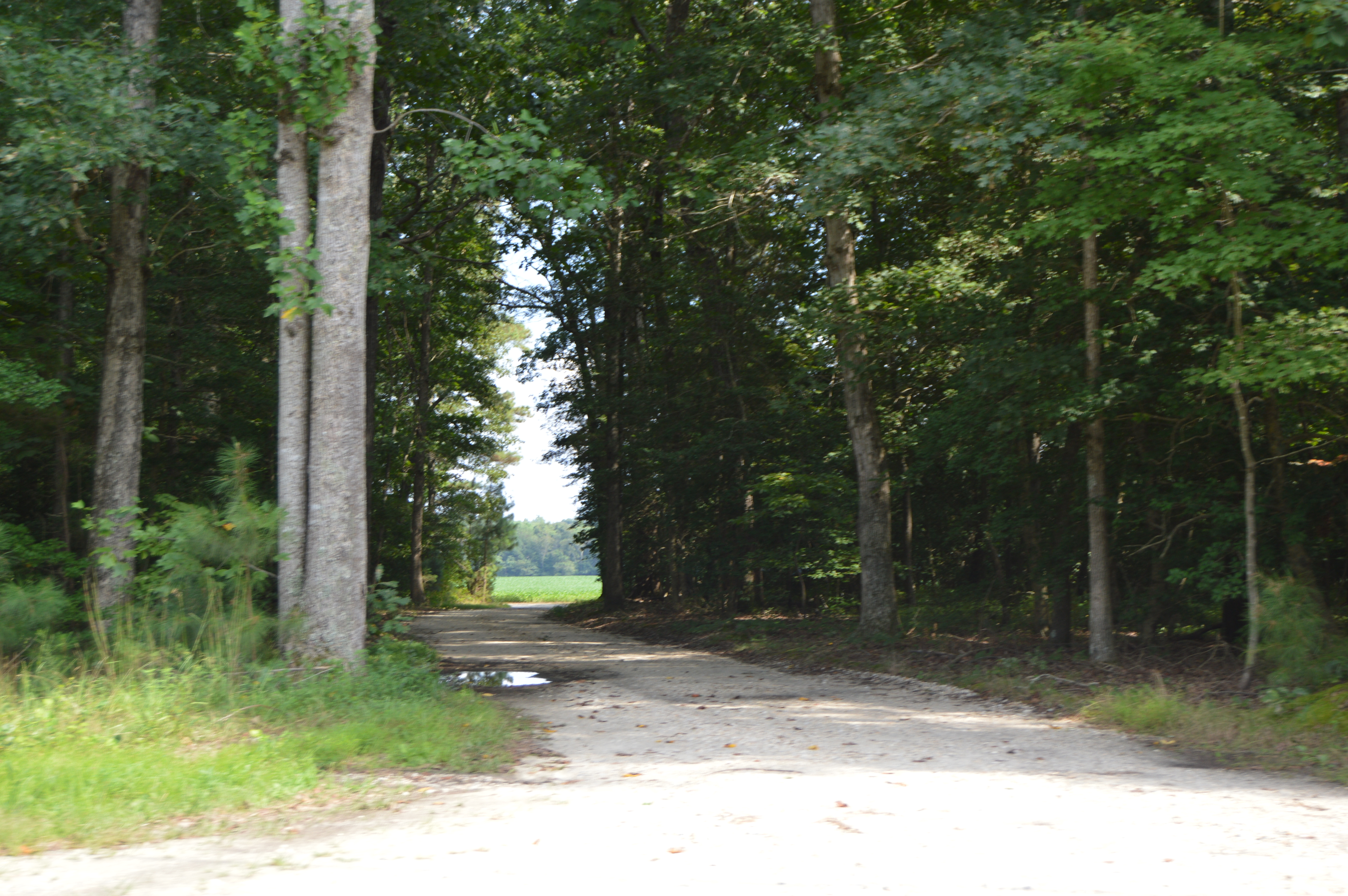
- Property entrance

- Location within Virginia Location within the United States
- Location: 8055 Rural Point Road, Studley, Virginia
- Coordinates: 37°40′14″N 77°22′1″W
- Area: 544 acres (220 ha)
- Built: 1800
- NRHP reference No.: 76002108
- Added to NRHP: December 12, 1976

Totomoi is an historic plantation in Hanover County, Virginia. The 544-acre (220 ha) property is located at 8055 Rural Point Road, near Studley. The property was, according to long-held family tradition, believed to belong to the family as early as the 17th century, but the discovery in the 21st century of family records place its purchase to 1800. The main plantation house is a brick two story building constructed in 1800 by Thomas Tinsley, one of six generations of that name. The main block is three bays wide, with a broad hall across the front and two rooms behind. Additions in 1820 and 1840 added single story ells to the east side of the house. The property includes a cluster of early 20th century farm outbuildings, and probably contains archaeological remnants of its 19th-century structures. The property, was, as of 2012, still owned by Tinsley's descendants.

Totomoi was listed on the National Register of Historic Places in 1976.

== See also ==
- National Register of Historic Places listings in Hanover County, Virginia
