= Wyoming (Studley, Virginia) =

Historic house in Virginia, United States

- U.S. National Register of Historic Places
- Virginia Landmarks Register
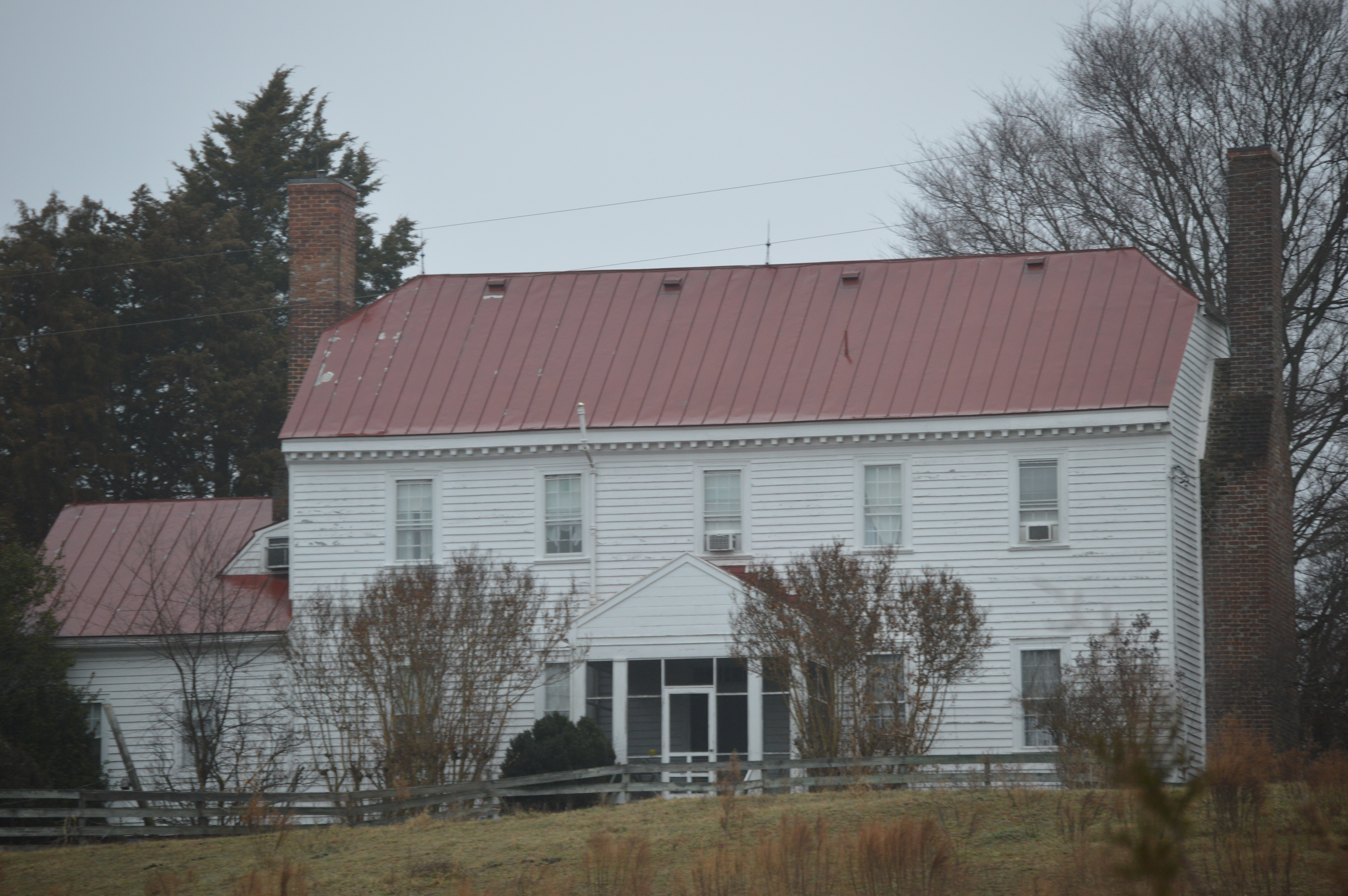
- Roadside view

- Location within Virginia Location within the United States
- Location: N of Studley on VA 615, near Studley, Virginia
- Coordinates: 37°43′24″N 77°17′10″W
- Area: 9 acres (3.6 ha)
- Built: c. 1800
- Architectural style: Georgian
- NRHP reference No.: 80004197
- VLR No.: 050-0075

Significant dates
- Added to NRHP: February 8, 1980
- Designated VLR: September 18, 1979

Wyoming is a historic home located near Studley in King William County, Virginia. Built about 1800 for the Hoomes family, the two-story, five-bay frame dwelling is in the Georgian style with a single-pile, central hall plan set on a brick foundation. The house is topped by a clipped gable roof with a standing-seam sheet metal surface and modillion cornice. It measures 55 feet long and 25 feet deep.

It was listed on the National Register of Historic Places in 1980.
