= Studley, Virginia =

Unincorporated community in Virginia, United States

- Unincorporated community
- Location within Virginia Location within the United States
- Coordinates: 37°40′33″N 77°17′27″W
- Country: United States
- State: Virginia
- County: Hanover
- Elevation: 171 ft (52 m)
- Time zone: UTC−5 (Eastern (EST))
  - Summer (DST): UTC−4 (EDT)
- ZIP code: 23162
- Area code: 804
- GNIS feature ID: 1477787

Studley is an unincorporated community in Hanover County, Virginia, United States. Studley is 12 miles (19 km) northeast of downtown Richmond. Studley has a post office with ZIP code 23162.

Patrick Henry's Birthplace Archeological Site, Pine Slash, Totomoi, Williamsville, and Wyoming are listed on the National Register of Historic Places.
