= Leatherwood Plantation =

Coordinates: 36°40.706′N 79°46.66′W

Leatherwood Plantation of 10,000 acres (40 km2) was located in Henry County, Virginia, where American Founding Father Patrick Henry lived from 1779 until 1784. The plantation is probably named after Leatherwood Creek, a tributary to the Smith River (Virginia), which ran through the property.

== Plantation life ==
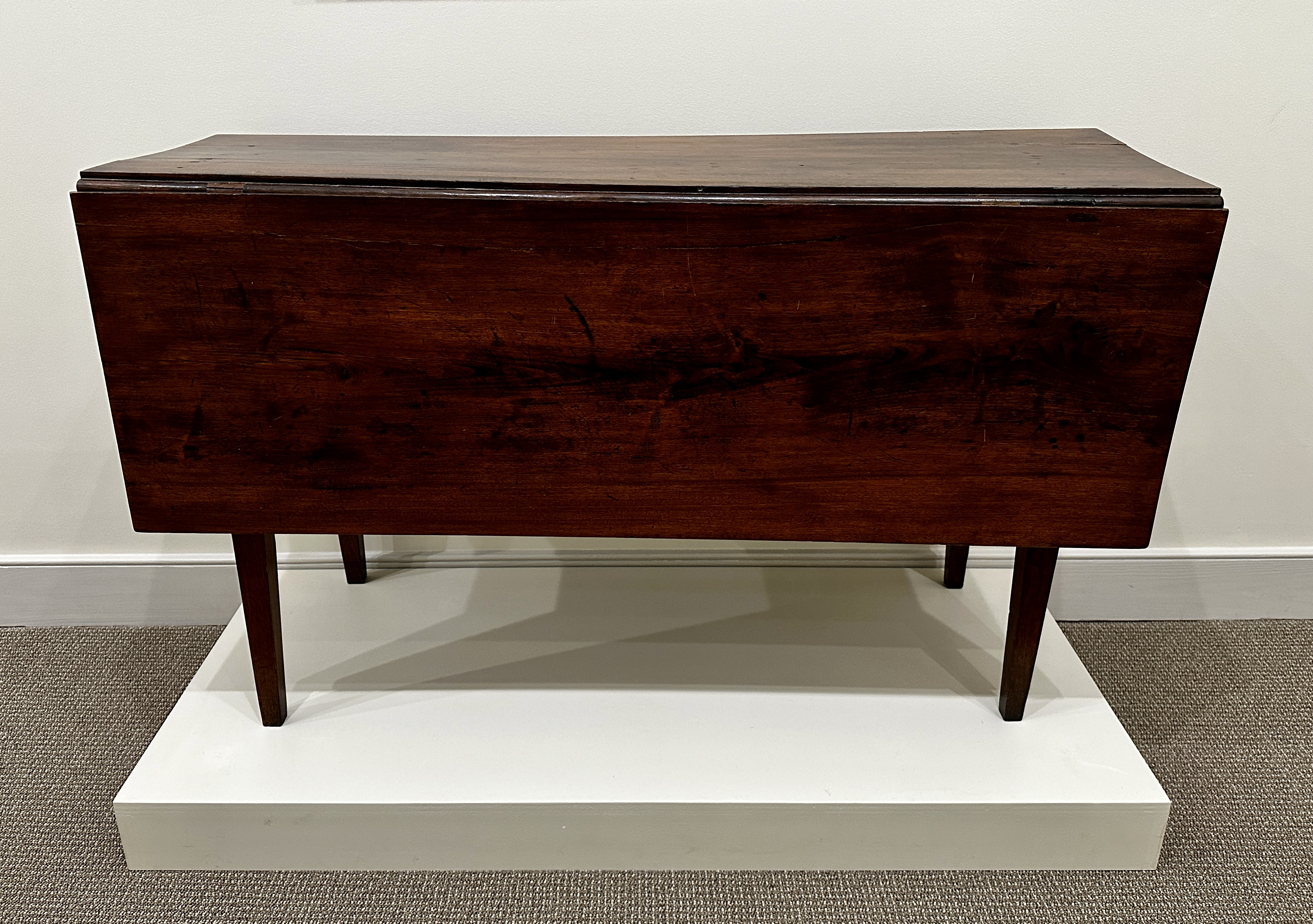
Drop-leaf dining table used by Patrick Henry at Leatherwood plantation

Patrick Henry purchased Leatherwood and jointly owned it along with his first cousin, Ann Winston Carr and her husband, George Waller. After Patrick Henry completed his first term as the first elected governor of Virginia in 1776, he moved to a brick home on Leatherwood plantation. There he grew tobacco and practiced law. In 1780, Henry County was named in his honor, and sent him back to the capital as their representative to the Virginia House of Delegates. Several of his children were born there during his residency.

Henry's daughter, Martha, lived and administered the plantation. "Martha (Patsey) born 1755 at "Pine Slash," died 1818, age 63 at "Leatherwood" in 1818, married 2 Oct 1773 to John Fontaine born 1750 at Beaverdam, VA, died at "Leatherwood" in 1792 of malaria. Martha, widowed at 37, managed Leatherwood plantation, administered the will of her husband and of her brother William; Martha and John buried at Leatherwood, Henry Co., VA." His son, John, also lived there. "John born 1757 at "Pine Slash," died ca. 1791 at age 34 at "Leatherwood," Revolutionary War soldier, buried in unmarked grave at "Leatherwood," Henry Co., VA, married Susannah Walker (she remarried 1798 to Richard White and died in Abingdon, VA)." His daughters, Sarah (Sallie) Butler, was born at Leatherwood on January 4, 1780, as was her sister, Martha Catharine (Kitty), born November 3, 1781. His son, Patrick Henry, Jr., was also born at Leatherwood on August 15, 1783.

Patrick Henry's son, John, was given 1,000 acres of the Leatherwood plantation to farm on his own, along with seven of the 42 slaves held there, in 1778.

Patrick Henry also saw the Leatherwood plantation as far removed from the combat in eastern Virginia, and thought his family safer from British forces while in Henry County.

Colonel Patrick Henry Fontaine, born of John and Martha Henry Fontaine, was a grandson of Patrick Henry, and was born on the site. The plantation was given to Henry's son-in-law and daughter upon their marriage.

The Leatherwood plantation later passed to the Hairston family. In 1832, Robert Hairston arranged for six slaves to be sent from the plantation to freedom in Liberia. The names of the freed slaves were not recorded.

== Monuments ==
There are several monuments to Leatherwood plantation as Patrick Henry's home.

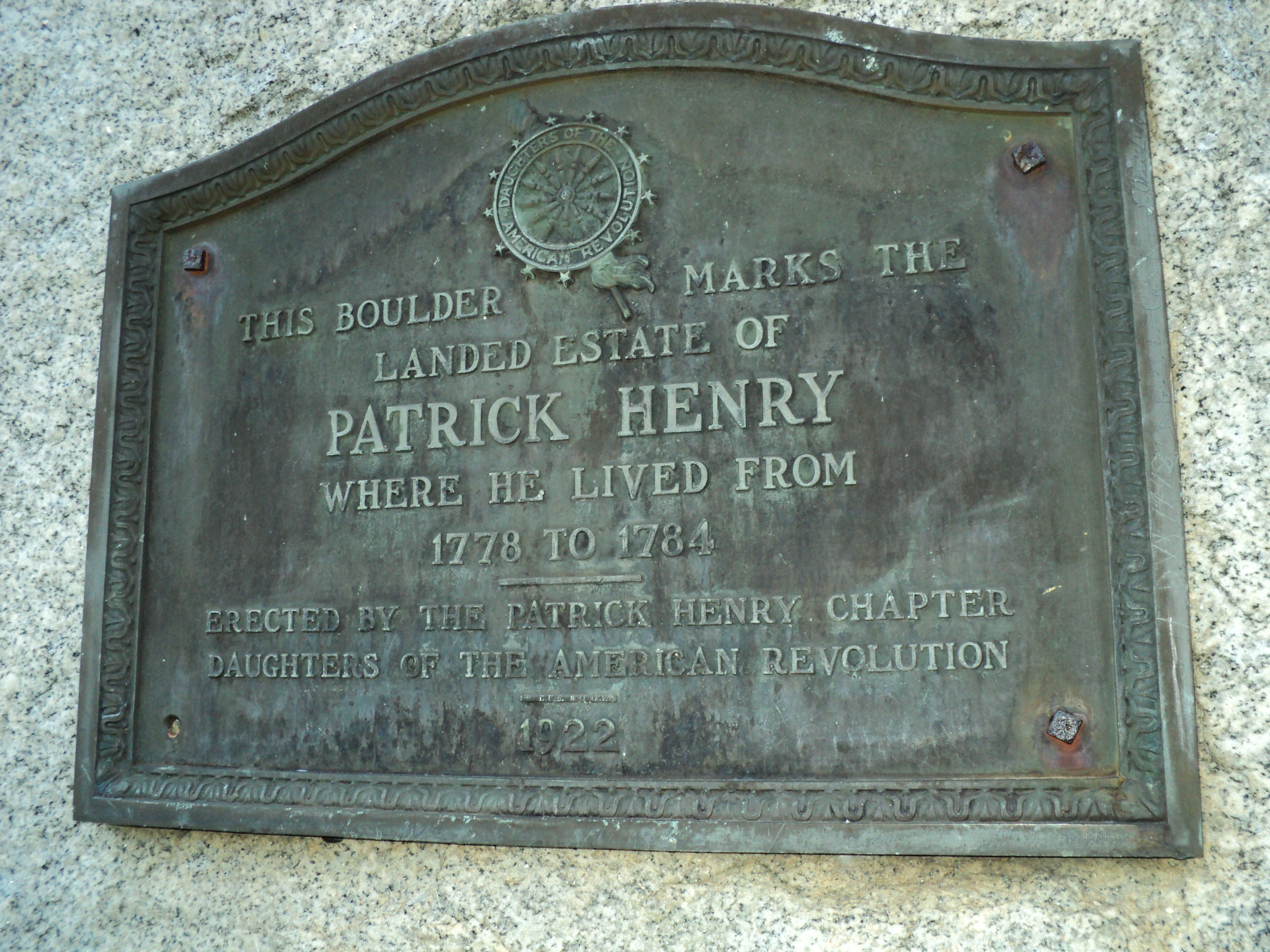
Boulder and plaque marking former location of Leatherwood Plantation in Henry County, Virginia

A large ten foot tall granite marker on a grassy park was erected in 1922 by the Daughters of the American Revolution near the site. The plaque reads: "This boulder marks the landed estate of Patrick Henry where he lived from 1778 to 1784. Erected by the Patrick Henry Chapter, Daughters of the American Revolution. 1922."

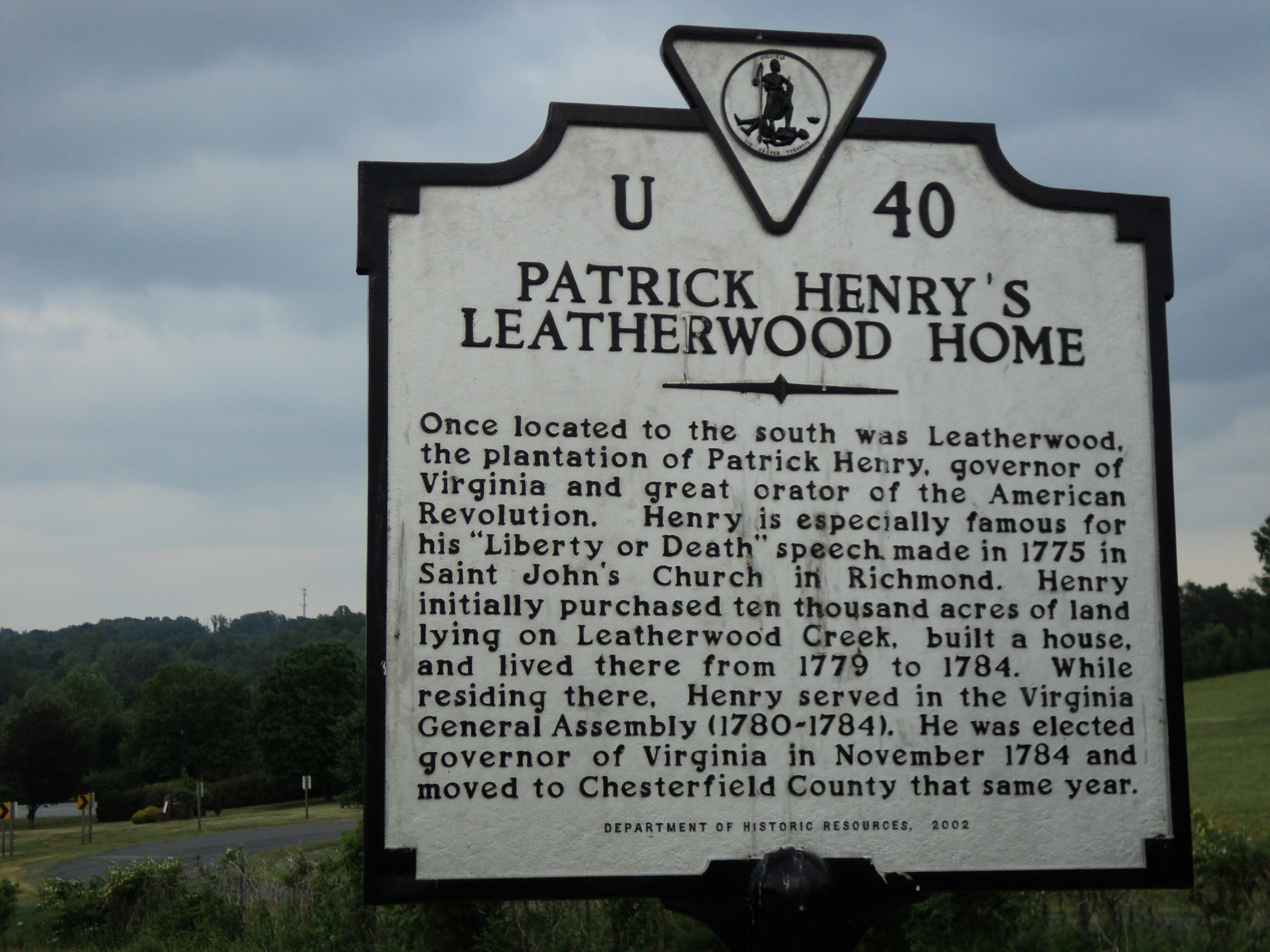
Virginia state historic marker for plantation of Patrick Henry, county's namesake, Leatherwood, Henry County

There is an historical marker near the site of the Leatherwood plantation that says: "Patrick Henry's Leatherwood Home Marker, U-40. Once located to the south was Leatherwood, the plantation of Patrick Henry, governor of Virginia and great orator of the American Revolution. Henry is especially famous for his "Liberty or Death" speech made in 1775 in Saint John's Church in Richmond. Henry initially purchased ten thousand acres of land lying on Leatherwood Creek, built a house, and lived there from 1779 to 1784. While residing there, Henry served in the Virginia General Assembly (1780-1784). He was elected governor of Virginia in November 1784 and moved to Chesterfield County that same year."

== See also ==
- Birthplace of Patrick Henry
- Pine Slash
- Scotchtown plantation
- Red Hill Patrick Henry National Memorial
