= Williamsville (Studley, Virginia) =

Historic house in Virginia, United States

- U.S. National Register of Historic Places
- Virginia Landmarks Register
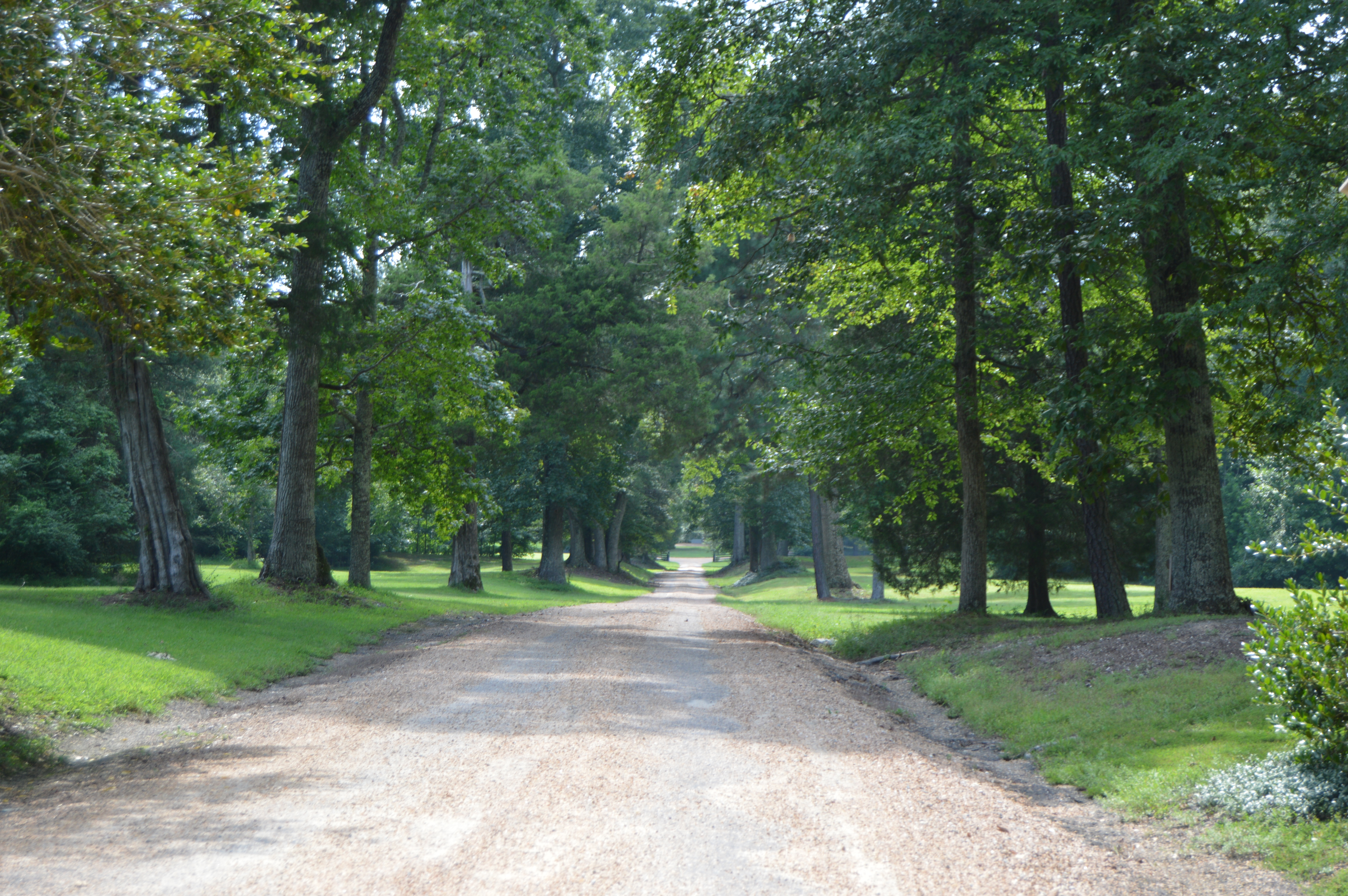
- Property entrance

- Location within Virginia Location within the United States
- Location: Off VA 615, Studley, Virginia
- Coordinates: 37°41′47″N 77°18′27″W
- Area: 15 acres (6.1 ha)
- Built: 1794-1803
- Built by: Benjamin Ellett
- Architectural style: Federal
- NRHP reference No.: 85002915
- VLR No.: 042-0027

Significant dates
- Added to NRHP: November 18, 1985
- Designated VLR: April 16, 1985

Williamsville is a historic home located at Studley, Hanover County, Virginia. The main house was built between 1794 and 1803, and is a two-story, five-bay, brick I-house in the Federal style. It has a rear ell. The house features a one-story wood porch surmounted by a balustrade and sophisticated trim, including the fully developed modillioned cornice and the elaborate Adamesque mantels.

It was listed on the National Register of Historic Places in 1985.
