= General Court of Virginia (colonial) =

The General Court was the first and highest court of colonial Virginia, and the highest criminal court in the Commonwealth of Virginia from 1814-1852.

== Colonial era ==
As early as 1619, the Governor and Council of the colony of Virginia performed judicial duties as the Council Court. The government began to refer to this as the Quarter Court (after the council's quarterly meetings) in 1626. By 1659, the councillors had trouble holding court on a quarterly schedule and reduced it to three times, then twice per year. and by 1662 legal documents called it the General Court.

=== Location ===
While Jamestown was the colonial capital, the court usually met there in various locations, including three state houses (all of which burned down), the governor's house and local taverns. After the capital moved to Williamsburg, the government built a state house and devoted one half of the building to the General Court's use.

=== Composition ===
The General Court was supposed to have twelve to thirteen members, and normally required at least five members present to hold a trial. The governor acted as president of the court and The Virginia Company originally appointed councillors; after its charter ended, the king appointed councillors based on a list of recommendations from the governor. Officially, each new Governor of Virginia or ruler of the United Kingdom had to recommission councillors, but most General Court appointments were effectively for life. The governor had the power to appoint temporary councillors if there were fewer than nine. The governor could also suspend councillors for just cause, but had to notify the English government and provide reasoning with sufficient proof for the suspension. During England's Commonwealth era, the Virginia House of Burgesses appointed both the governor and the councillors.

=== Jurisdiction ===
The General Court had original and appellate jurisdiction for civil and criminal cases in Virginia.

==== Original Jurisdiction ====
At first, it heard almost all cases in Virginia, but after the colony established county courts, the General Court only kept original jurisdiction for civil lawsuits involving a minimum amount of damages. The minimum required was originally ten pounds sterling, but increased to twenty pounds over the years. It shared original jurisdiction over chancery cases with the county courts. The General Court had exclusive original jurisdiction for any criminal cases for which the punishment was loss of life or limb, and shared original jurisdiction over minor crimes with the county courts.

==== Appellate Jurisdiction ====
The General Court heard appeals of decisions from the county courts, as well as decisions the General Court had issued under its original jurisdiction. Originally, the court could hear any appeal, but in 1647 the House of Burgesses passed a law restricting its civil appellate jurisdiction to cases involving an amount at controversy of at least ten pounds sterling or 1600 pounds of tobacco. Appellants had to pay a penalty if the General Court upheld the original decision; originally, the appellant had to pay double the original damages, but this was eventually reduced to 115% of the original damages. The court had no restrictions, however, on hearing appeals in cases in which no monetary damages were sought.

=== Problems ===
Some attorneys who had studied and practiced law in England did not think highly of the General Court; among other things, they complained about the councillors' lack of legal training and the fact that people who were involved in writing the law (the Council was the upper house of the Virginia's legislature) also interpreted it.

The colonial General Court was overworked. The legislature passed a law in 1761 prohibiting lawyers from practicing before both the county courts and the General Court in an effort to reduce frivolous appeals, but the resulting lack of lawyers able to practice before the General Court resulted in even more congested dockets. Although the court processed criminal cases fairly quickly, civil cases could stretch for years, and defendants could successfully delay litigation for long periods of time.

== Post-Revolutionary era ==
The Virginia Assembly re-established the General Court in 1777.

=== Location ===
The new General Court held sessions in Richmond.

=== Composition ===
The court originally consisted of five judges, with three judges sitting on a panel; the assembly later increased the court's size to twelve. Unlike the colonial-era court, the assembly elected judges, whom the governor then commissioned. General Court judges also served on the District Courts, which is where they spent the majority of their time.

=== Jurisdiction ===
The General Court lost much of its colonial-era jurisdiction.

==== Original Jurisdiction ====
The court shared original jurisdiction over probate and cases involving public debtors.

==== Appellate Jurisdiction ====
In 1814, the assembly made the General Court Virginia's criminal tribunal of last resort.

=== End of the court ===
Virginia's Constitution of 1851 abolished the General Court; it officially ceased to exist on July 1, 1852. The Virginia Supreme Court of Appeals assumed the General Court's appellate jurisdiction.

== See also ==
- Government of Virginia
- Virginia Governor's Council – about the Court in its capacity as the Governor's Council.
