= Anthony Winston =

American planter, judge and politician

Member of the Virginia House of Delegates from Buckingham County
- In office May 3, 1779 – December 24, 1779 Serving with Joseph Curd
- Preceded by: William Kennon
- Succeeded by: John Cabell

Member of the House of Burgesses from Buckingham County, Colony of Virginia,
- In office 1775–1776 Serving with John Nicholas
- Preceded by: Henry Bell
- Succeeded by: position abolished

Personal details
- Born: November 17, 1750 Hanover County, Colony of Virginia
- Died: December 20, 1828 (aged 78) Colbert County, Alabama, US

Military service
- Allegiance: United States
- Branch/service: Virginia militia Continental Army
- Years of service: 1779–1783
- Rank: Colonel(Continental Army)
- Battles/wars: American Revolutionary War

Anthony Winston (November 17, 1750 – December 20, 1828) was an American military officer, politician and planter. About two decades after the death of his father of the same name, in Buckingham County, Virginia (which this man represented in the Virginia General Assembly both before and after the American Revolutionary War), he and his brothers moved to what became Mississippi Territory and later Alabama Territory, where several descendants continued the family's military, plantation and political traditions.

== Early and family life ==
This Anthony Winston was born on November 25, 1750, in Hanover County, Virginia to prominent planter and judge Anthony Winston (1723–1783) and his wife, the formerly widowed Alice Thornton Taylor (1730–1764). His grandfather, sea Captain Isaac Winston and his wife, the former Sarah Jennings, had settled near the falls of the James River and what became Richmond, Virginia. They also had three daughters who married into prominent Virginia planter families: Lucy Winston Dabney (1703–1791), Sarah Winston Henry (1709–1784; mother of Patrick Henry) and Mary Ann Winston Coles (1721–1758). Around 1765, the Winston family obtained a five-year old orphaned Portuguese boy, Peter Francisco, who had been found on the docks at City Point, Virginia and taken to the Prince George County Poorhouse. Capt. Winston realized that the boy spoke Portuguese and said he had been kidnapped in the Azores with his sister, who had died. Francisco became an indentured servant in Judge Winston's household, trained as a blacksmith and became known as the "American Hercules" during the American Revolutionary War for his feats of strength (as a subordinate of this man), then served many years as sergeant of the Virginia legislature. At some point well before the conflict, while a young man, the elder Anthony Winston moved his family to Buckingham County and became its sheriff and later justice of the peace and eventually judge before dying in 1783.

On March 11, 1776, this Anthony Winston married Keziah Walker Jones (1760–1826), who bore seven sons: Anthony Winston (1782–1841), John Jones Winston (1785–1850), William Winston (1789–1857), Joel Walker Winston (1792–1840), Isaac Winston (1795–1863), Edmund Winston and Thomas Jones Winston (1804–1843). The family also included two daughters, Alice Taylor Winston Pettus (1790–1871) and Mrs. Jessee Jones. Two grandsons would become governors of states which attempted to secede from the United States, prompting the American Civil War: John Anthony Winston (1812–1871) of Alabama and John Jones Pettus (1813–1867) of Mississippi. Another grandson, CSA General Edmund Winston Pettus later represented Alabama in the U.S. Senate.

== Career ==
Voters in Buckingham County elected Winston to what would be the final session Virginia House of Burgesses, where he served alongside fellow patriot and later prominent lawyer John Nicholas. After the colony's governor, Lord Dunmore, suppressed the legislature, Winston, Nicholas and veteran legislators Charles May and Henry Bell attended the First Revolutionary Convention in Richmond, then only Winston and Nicholas attended the Second Revolutionary Convention, which was to be Winston's last during the conflict, due to his military duties.

Following the conflict, Winston once won election as one of Buckingham County's representatives in the Virginia House of Delegates, for the term beginning May 3, 1779, when he served alongside Joseph Curd, before voters elected two members of the prominent (and wealthy) Cabell family. His father, also Anthony Winston, a longtime judge in the area, died in Buckingham County in 1783. In the 1787 Virginia tax census his estate owned nine adult slaves, one slave between 16 and 20 years old, as well as seven horses and 17 cattle, while this man (his son of the same name) did not reside in the county but owned six adult slaves, 11 slaves between 16 and 20 years old, six horses and a dozen cattle.

This Anthony Winston and some of his brothers, as well as their families and slaves moved to Davidson County, Tennessee, then Madison County in what was initially Mississippi Territory, then Alabama Territory about the year 1810. Capt. Anthony Winston was listed on the residents list for Madison County in 1816 but settled in Colbert County and either he or his son bought land in what became Huntsville. His second son, John Jones Winston (1785–1850) would continue the family's military tradition during the War of 1812, as well as became a friend of future U.S. President Andrew Jackson, who danced at his wedding.

== Death and legacy ==
Capt. Winston survived his wife by nearly two years, dying in 1828. They and many descendants are interred at the family cemetery near Sheffield, Alabama, technically Tuscumbia in Colbert County, Alabama.
