= Pine Slash =

Historic house in Virginia, United States

- U.S. National Register of Historic Places
- Virginia Landmarks Register
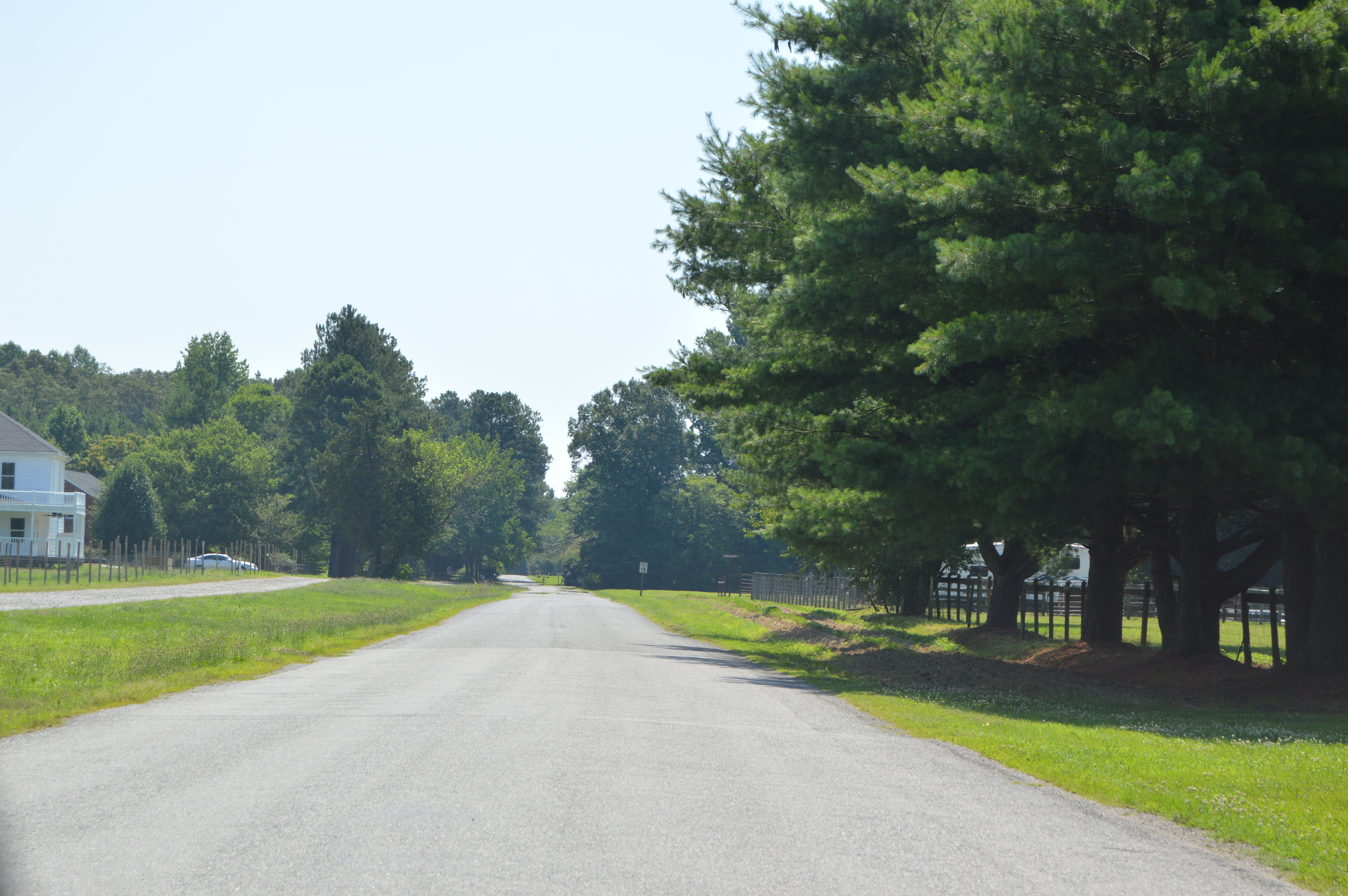
- Property entrance

- Location within Virginia Location within the United States
- Location: VA 643, Studley, Virginia
- Coordinates: 37°39′19″N 77°19′35″W
- Area: 138 acres (56 ha)
- Built: c. 1750
- NRHP reference No.: 87001946
- VLR No.: 042-0025

Significant dates
- Added to NRHP: November 19, 1987
- Designated VLR: December 9, 1986

Pine Slash, also known as Prospect Hill, is a historic home located at Studley, Hanover County, Virginia. The main house was built about 1750, and is a one-story dwelling of colonial vertical plank construction with a metal gable roof. In addition to the main house, the property includes a contributing second residence and a brick outbuilding, both dating from the early 19th century. Pine Slash is significant as American Founding Father Patrick Henry's home in the 1750s.

It was listed on the National Register of Historic Places in 1987.
