= The Cloisters (Letchworth) =

Masonic centre in Hertfordshire, UK

Coordinates: 51°58′06″N 0°13′31″W

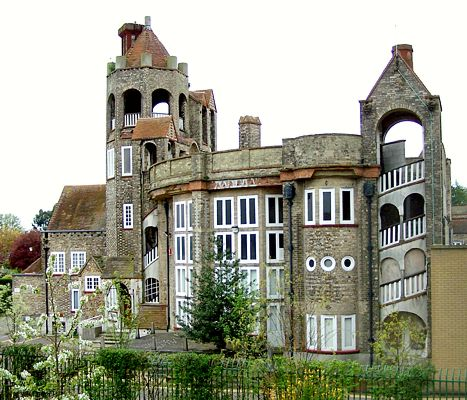
The Cloisters Letchworth

The Cloisters in Letchworth Garden City, Hertfordshire in the UK was built in 1905 as an open-air school dedicated to Psychology and where students were taught skills from the Arts and Crafts movement. After a period of neglect during World War II The Cloisters became the North Hertfordshire Masonic Centre in 1951.

== Annie Jane Lawrence ==
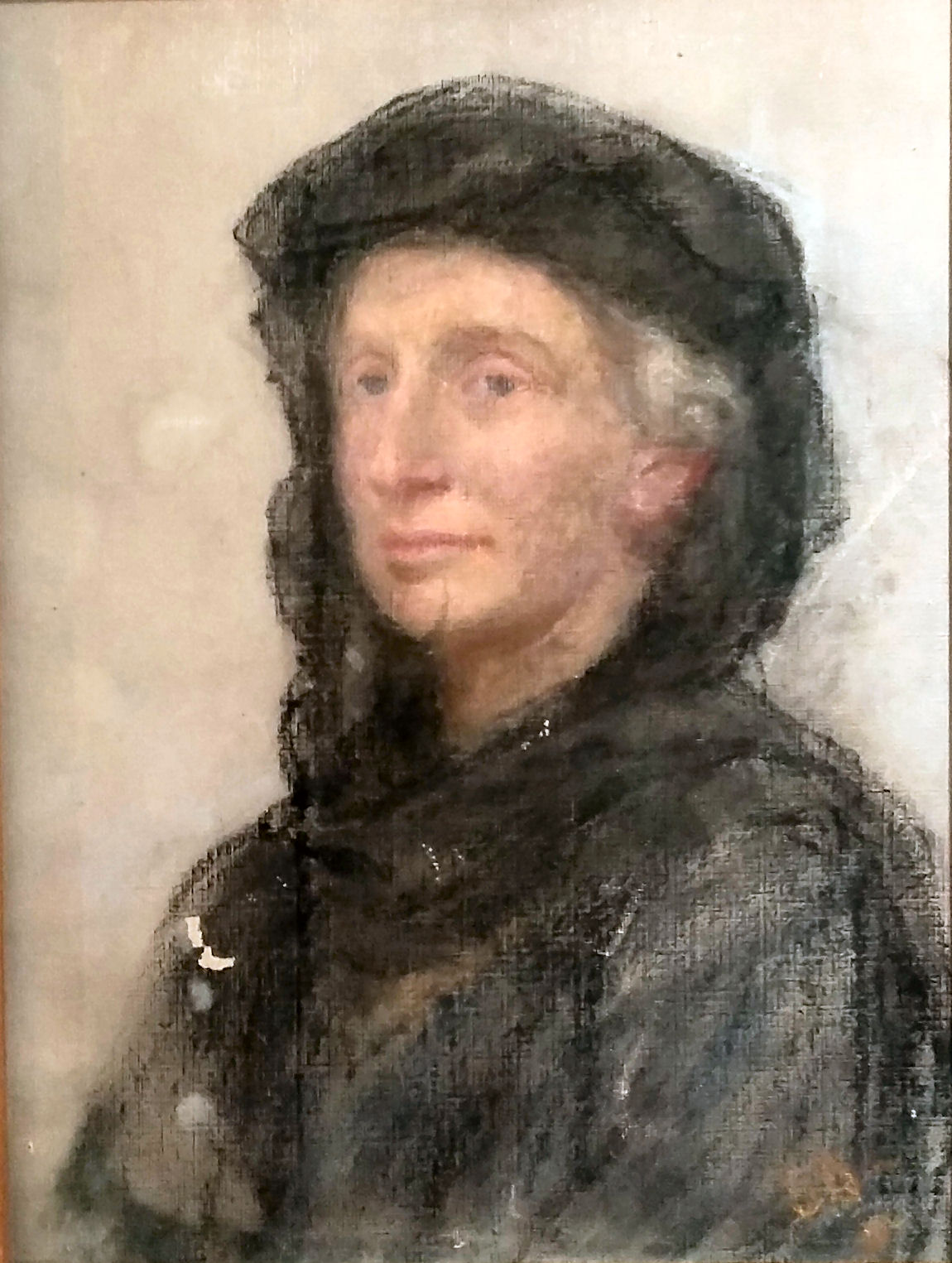
Annie Jane Lawrence c.1910

The Cloisters was built by Quaker Annie Jane Lawrence (16 April 1863 – 3 August 1953), the daughter of Alfred Lawrence (1826–1875), who, with his brother Frederick, owned 'Lawrence Brothers, Smiths and Founders', and his wife Mary Elizabeth (née Ridge, 1838–1903). Her grandfather William Lawrence (1789–1855) came from humble origins but went on to be elected Master of the Worshipful Company of Carpenters in 1848 and an Alderman of the City of London, while her uncle Sir James Lawrence was Lord Mayor of London in 1868. Her younger brother was the Labour politician Frederick Pethick-Lawrence, 1st Baron Pethick-Lawrence (1871–1961). In 1881 she was a pupil at the School for Ladies in Hove in Sussex, while in 1895 she visited Boston in the USA.

As a young woman she undertook social work in the slums of London, which urged her on to action. Lawrence decided to build a centre dedicated as a school of thought from which adults could go out and effect social change. She chose Letchworth because it was the world's First Garden City; here she leased three acres of land on which she built The Cloisters and Cloisters Lodge, intending that the former should be a School of Philosophy while she lived in the latter.

== Design ==
The design reputedly came to Miss Lawrence in a dream. The building originally consisted of a large half-oval 'open-air room' called the `Cloisters Garth' with an open colonnade to the south and large glazed bays to the north; this was flanked by two wings, one housing the kitchen and store rooms and the other the cubicles and dressing rooms for an oval open-air swimming pool. It was designed according to the principles of the Arts and Crafts movement, and was built using marbles and other materials from all over Europe.

== 1905–1907 ==
Originally built as an open-air school dedicated to Psychology, with accommodation for 20 students, students were encouraged to study "how thought affects action and what causes and produces thought." Through healthy outdoor living it was intended that the students would develop healthy minds. The building was also designed to hold lectures, conferences, drama and musical performances as well as organ recitals. Students were also taught skills from the Arts and Crafts movement.

Designed by architect William Harrison Cowlishaw, building commenced on the 3-acre (1.2 ha) site in 1905, and the building opened on 17 January 1907, having cost the then huge sum of £20,000. Miss Lawrence built a house for herself, 'Cloisters Lodge', alongside.

== 1907–1939 ==
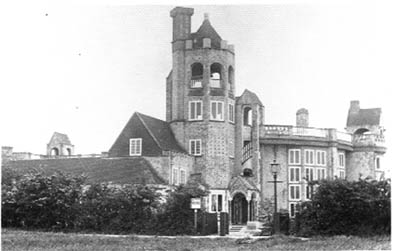
The Cloisters in 1908

A small community developed at The Cloisters dedicated to Theosophy. It became the base for the Alpha Union set up by John Bruce Wallace of the Brotherhood Church, who organised summer schools and residential courses there. Lawrence, although somewhat deaf, was a great music lover. On one occasion she brought The London Concert Orchestra, made up of 40 unemployed musicians, to play at the Cloisters Garth. This was part of an ongoing series of concerts that she organised attended by audiences of 1,000, making organ recitals, band and choral concerts a regular part of the new town's cultural life. The last concert was given by the Brotherhood Orchestra in 1939 on the day the Second World War broke out.

== History since 1939 ==
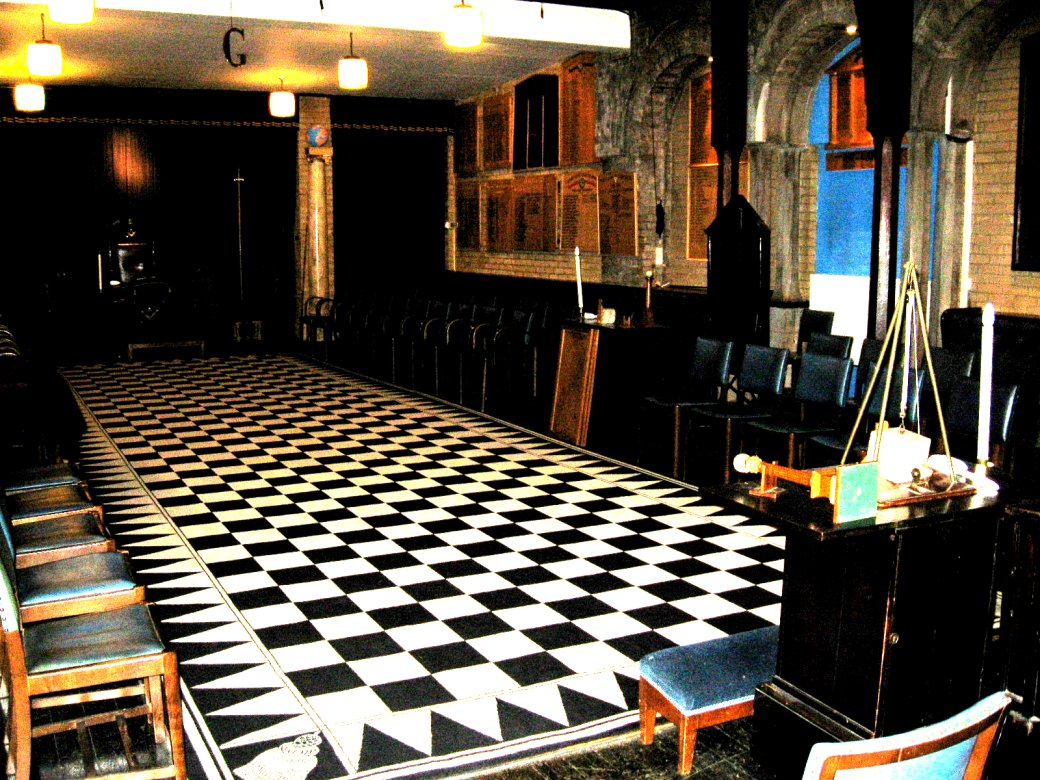
The Masonic Temple at The Cloisters

The Cloisters was commandeered by the Army during the Second World War and suffered damage. By 1948, Lawrence found it increasingly difficult to maintain the building and to repair the damage caused by the Army. She initially offered it to the local Council, who turned it down. Eventually, she offered it to the local Freemasons who accepted it, turning it into the North Hertfordshire Masonic Centre. About sixty Masonic lodges and 'side degrees' meet at The Cloisters, and the centre is run and maintained by an elected Board of Trustees, The Lawrence Cloisters Trust. A Craft Lodge, the 'Cloisters Lodge No 7100' was formed there in 1951 to commemorate Miss Lawrence's donation of the building to Hertfordshire Freemasons.

Lawrence eventually moved out of Cloisters Lodge into a house on Willian Way in Letchworth but her increasing frailty led to her moving to St Catherine's Nursing Home where she died aged 90 on 3 August 1953. She is buried in the churchyard of All Saints Church in Willian in Hertfordshire. In her will she left £41,246 2s 6d to George Ernest Hinman (Solicitor) and her brother Frederick William Pethick-Lawrence. Bar and kitchen staff and others in the building late at night have experienced hearing the voice of a woman calling out in greeting leading to the theory that it is haunted by its founder, Miss Annie Lawrence.

The Cloisters has been designated by Letchworth Garden City Corporation as one of the 'great historic buildings' of North Hertfordshire. It is a Grade II* listed building. In June 2013 The Cloisters appeared in episode 4 of ITV's five-part series Britain's Secret Homes, placing it in 16th place out of 50 historic buildings in Britain selected by English Heritage.

Although structurally sound, in October 2013 the building was put on English Heritage's 'At Risk Register' owing mainly to the poor condition of its roof tiles which have allowed water to cause damage.

== Freemasons at The Cloisters ==
- Leonard Parkin, ITN newscaster
- Christopher Reynalds, child actor of the 1960s and 1970s

== Gallery ==
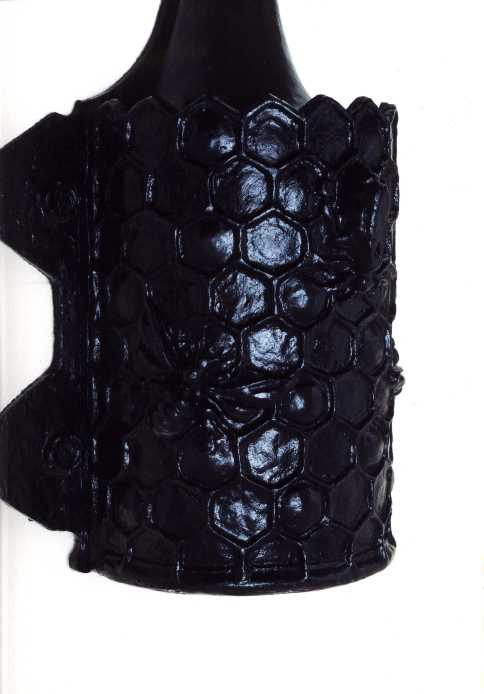
A hand-cast lead drainpipe with design of bees and bats from The Cloisters

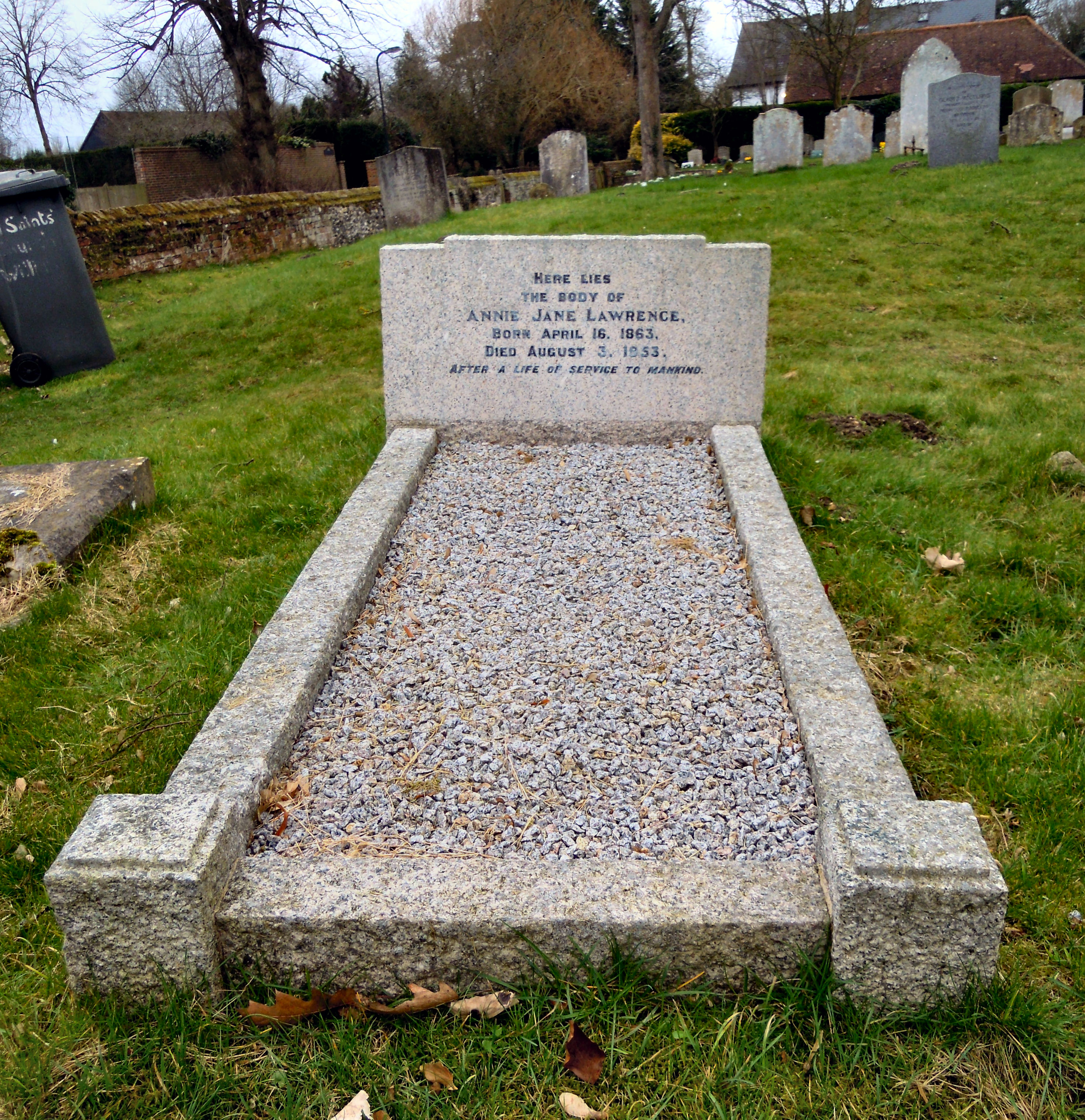
The grave of Annie Lawrence in the church of All Saints at Willian in Hertfordshire
