= Bernard George Ellis =

Bernard Ellis
- Born: 21 November 1890; Surbiton, Surrey
- Died: 1 July 1979 (aged 88); Letchworth, Hertfordshire
- Military career
- Allegiance: United Kingdom
- Branch: British Army
- Service years: 1914–1919
- Rank: Lieutenant
- Conflicts: First World War; Second World War
- Awards: George Cross

Bernard George Ellis, GC (21 November 1890 – 1 July 1979) was a junior officer in the British Army who was awarded the Albert Medal for bravery during the First World War while serving in Mesopotamia. His Albert Medal was exchanged for the George Cross in 1971.

== Early life ==
Ellis was born in Surbiton, Surrey, on 21 November 1890, the son of Henry Charles Ellis and May (née Bennett). He was educated at Salisbury Cathedral School and at the Montpelier School at Paignton in Devon. The family lived at Home Cottage in Roundwell in Bearsted. Ellis had one brother, Charles Harold. His great-grandfather, Charles Ellis, was the Mayor of Maidstone in 1860, and his grandfather, Charles Jr., was also Mayor of Maidstone three times: in 1864, 1872 and 1878.

== First World War ==
When the First World War broke out in 1914, Ellis was working at the Union of London and Smith's Bank in Maidstone. He enlisted with the Public Schools Corps in September 1914 as a private and arrived in France with them in November 1915, serving in the trenches for six months opposite the Hohenzollern Redoubt. He returned to England and trained as a bomb instructor at Oxford, following which he was given a commission before being gazetted to the Buffs (Royal East Kent Regiment), going with his battalion to India and then to Mesopotamia.

According to The London Gazette of 18 July 1919:

On 21 August 1918, Lieutenant Ellis was with a party at Shahraban under instruction in the firing of rifle grenades. A volley was fired, but one of the grenades, owing to a defective cartridge, did not leave the rifle, but fell back into the barrel with the fuse burning. The firer lost his head and dropped the rifle and grenade in the trench, but Lieutenant Ellis, who was separated from the man by four other men in a narrow trench, at once forced his way past them and seized the rifle. Failing to extract the grenade, he dropped the rifle and placed his steel helmet over the grenade, which at once exploded, severely injuring him. There can be no doubt that his prompt and courageous action greatly minimised the force of the explosion and saved several men from death or injury.

== Later life ==
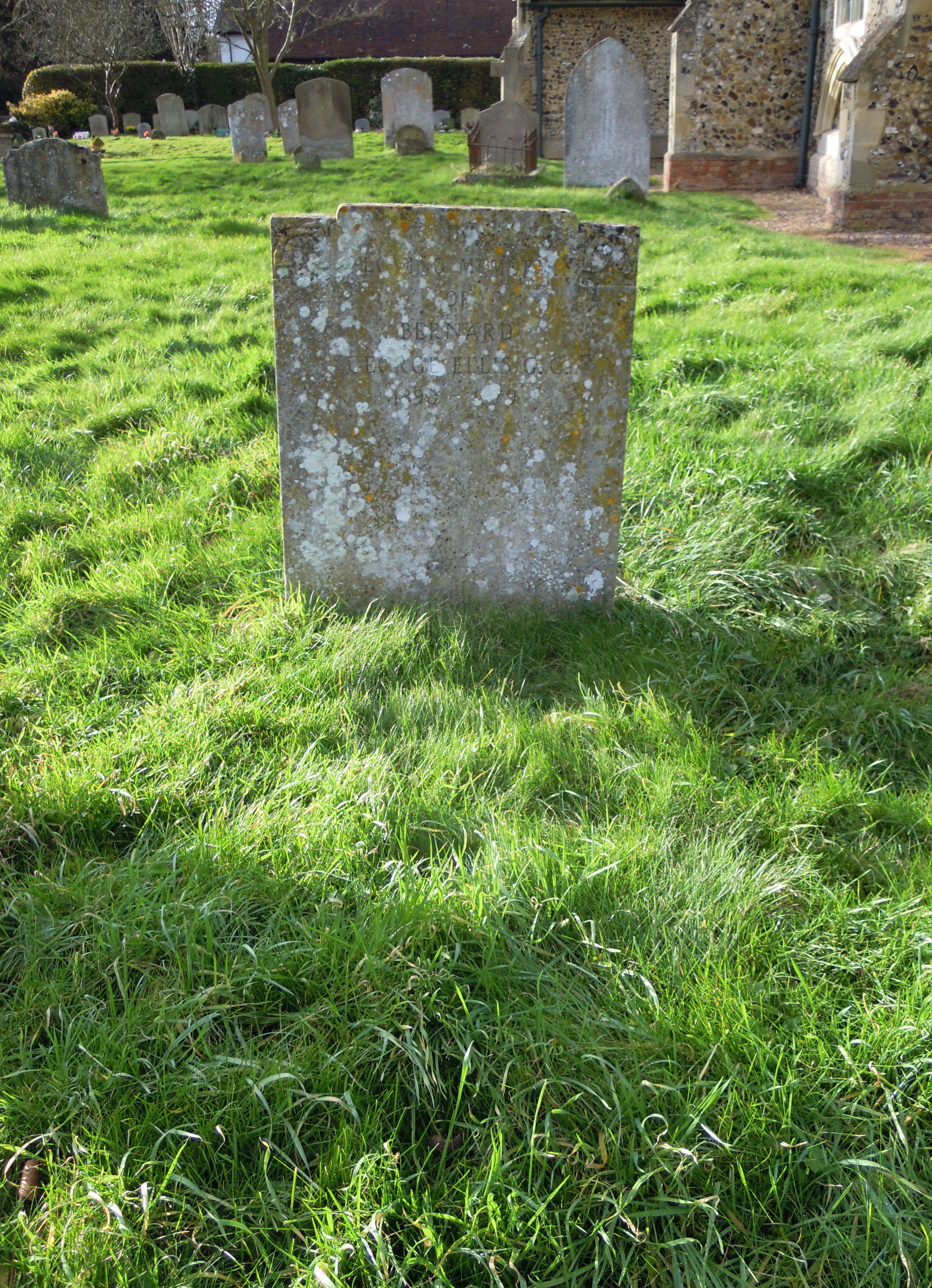
The grave of Bernard George Ellis in the churchyard of All Saints church at Willian

Ellis survived his injuries and was invalided back to India, where he served as Captain of the Guard to Lord Willingdon, Governor of Bombay. Despite 350 pieces of the exploded grenade being in his body, 77 of them in his right arm, Ellis remained a keen sportsman. In 1971 he was among the surviving recipients of the Albert Medal and the Edward Medal who accepted the offer to exchange their awards for the George Cross. He also received the 1914–15 Star, British War Medal, Victory Medal and the Defence Medal. His medals are now in the collection of the National Army Museum in London.

Ellis died in Letchworth in Hertfordshire in 1979 and is buried in the churchyard of All Saints church in Willian, Hertfordshire.
