= Tolstoyan movement =

Social movement based on the views of Leo Tolstoy

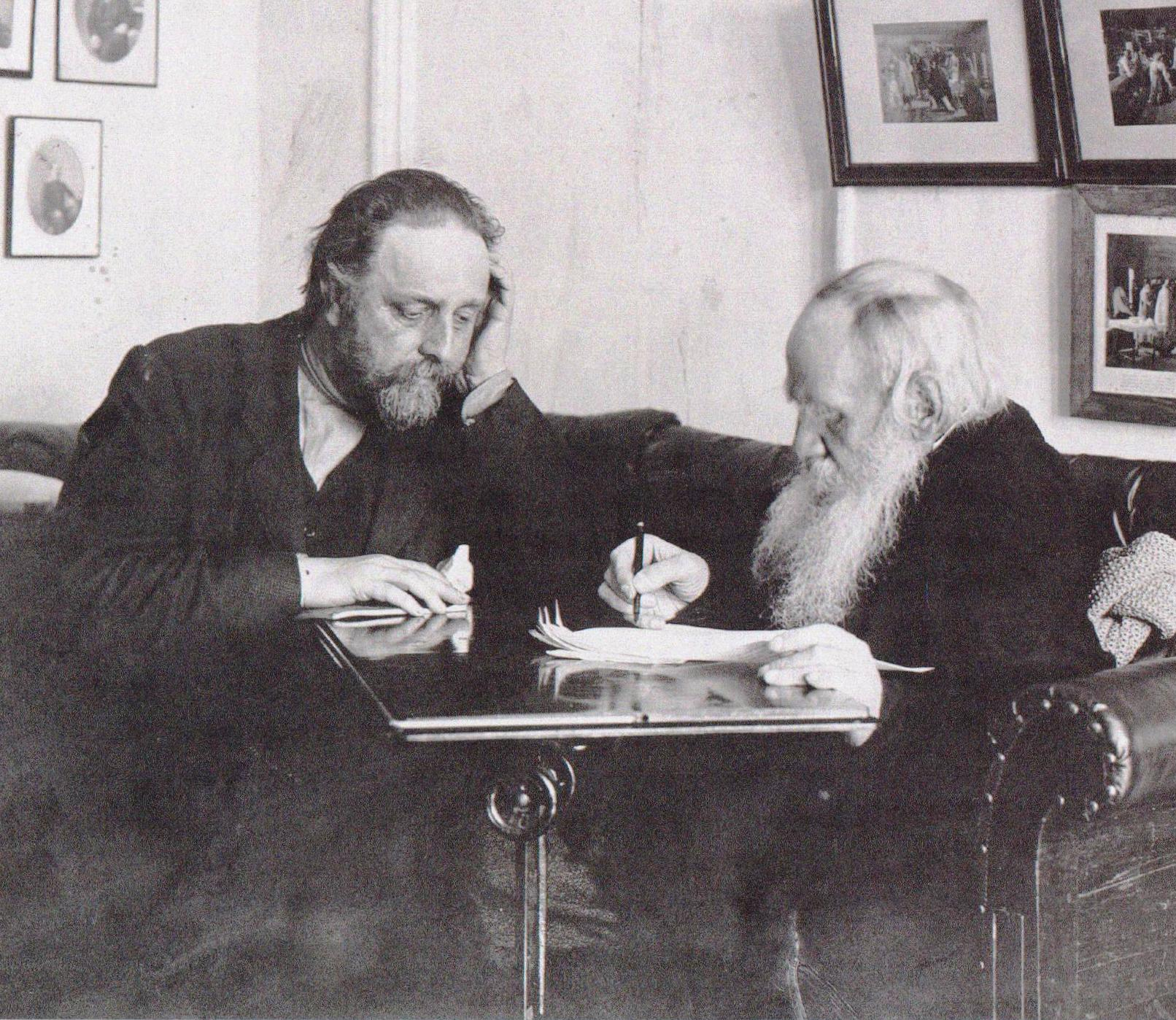
Vladimir Chertkov (left) with Leo Tolstoy (right)

The Tolstoyan movement (Russian: Толсто́вство, romanized: Tolstovstvo) is a social movement based on the philosophical and religious views of Russian novelist Leo Tolstoy (1828–1910). Tolstoy's views were formed by rigorous study of the ministry of Jesus, particularly the Sermon on the Mount.

Tolstoy expressed "great joy" that groups of people "have been springing up, not only in Russia but in various parts of Europe, who are in complete agreement with our views." However, the author also thought it was a mistake to create a specific movement or doctrine after him, urging individuals to listen to their own conscience rather than blindly follow his. In regard to a letter he received from an adherent, he wrote:

To speak of "Tolstoyism," to seek guidance, to inquire about my solution of questions, is a great and gross error. There has not been, nor is there any "teaching" of mine. There exists only the one eternal universal teaching of the Truth, which for me, for us, is especially clearly expressed in the Gospels...I advised this young lady to live not by my conscience, as she wished, but by her own.

== Beliefs and practices ==
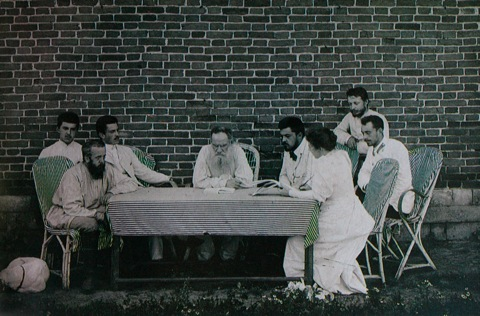
Tolstoy organising famine relief in Samara, 1891.

Tolstoyans (Russian: Толстовцы, Tolstovtsy) identify themselves as Christians, but do not generally belong to an institutional Church. Tolstoy was a harsh critic of the Russian Orthodox Church, leading to his excommunication in 1901. Tolstoyans tend to focus more on following the teachings of Jesus, rather than on his miracles or divinity. They attempt to live an ascetic and simple life, preferring to be vegetarian, non-smoking, teetotal and chaste. Tolstoyans are considered Christian pacifists and advocate nonresistance in all circumstances. Tolstoy's understanding of what it means to be Christian was defined by the Sermon on the Mount and summed up in five simple propositions:

1. Love your enemies
2. Do not be angry
3. Do not fight evil with evil, but return evil with good (an interpretation of turning the other cheek)
4. Do not lust
5. Do not take oaths.

They do not support or participate in the government which they consider immoral, violent and corrupt. Tolstoy rejected the state (as it only exists on the basis of physical force) and all institutions that are derived from it – the police, law courts and army. Thus, many now regard them as Christian anarchists. Historically, Tolstoy's ideas have had some influence on anarchist thought, specifically on anarcho-pacifism. They were also cited as an inspiration by Mahatma Gandhi in the formation of his own philosophy of nonviolence from both Jainism and Hinduism.

Leon Trotsky summed up Tolstoy's social philosophy, on the basis of his writings, in five "programmatic theses":

1. "It is not some kind of iron sociologic laws that produce the enslavement of peoples, but legal codes."
2. "Modern slavery rests on three statutes: those on land, taxes and property."
3. "Not alone the Russian state but every state is an institution for committing, by violence and with impunity the most horrible crimes."
4. "Genuine social progress is attained only through the religious and moral self-perfection of individuals".
5. "To get rid of states it is not necessary to fight against them with external means. All that is needed is not to take part in them and not to support them."

=== Vegetarianism ===
The vegetarian movement started in Europe in the 19th century. The first Vegetarian Society was founded in Manchester in 1847. Tolstoy became a prominent influence on the movement. He became vegetarian, along with his two daughters, in 1885. His relevant essay The First Step (1891), and others were promoted by vegetarian societies internationally.

His vegetarianism was part of a Christian philosophy of non-violence that he developed. At that time, vegetarian restaurants were few, and they often served as meeting spaces for Tolstoyans, and other social reformers. The movement was mostly ovo-lacto vegetarian at the time. However, abstinence from meat eating was not an obligatory part of the philosophy of the Tolstoyan movement as some preferred to eat meat. Historian Charlotte Alston has written that "from meat eating to fruitarianism, the movement embraced and tolerated a wide variety of positions".

Notable vegetarian Tolstoyans who considered vegetarianism to be a central part of their belief system included Felix Ortt, president of the Dutch Vegetarian Society, and Arthur St. John of the Croydon Brotherhood Church.

== Groups and colonies ==
=== Africa ===
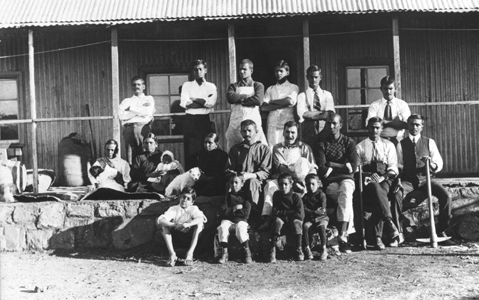
Mohandas K. (later Mahatma) Gandhi and other residents of Tolstoy Farm, 1910

Mohandas Karamchand (later Mahatma) Gandhi set up a cooperative colony called Tolstoy Farm near Johannesburg, South Africa, having been inspired by Tolstoy's ideas. The colony comprising 1,100 acres (4.5 km^{2}) was funded by the Gandhian Hermann Kallenbach and placed at the disposal of the satyagrahis from 1910.

=== North America ===
Ernest Howard Crosby was a notable Tolstoyan in the United States. He was a supporter of the Christian Commonwealth Colony in Columbus, Georgia, which was established in 1896 by a number of Christian socialists and comprised 932 acres (3.77 km^{2}). The residents were also influenced by the views of Henry George and Edward Bellamy.

N. O. Nelson, a Tolstoyan, founded the Leclaire cooperative village at Edwardsville, Illinois in 1890. With the economic base of a plumbing supply factory, it prospered but Nelson's other cooperative projects faltered and he was forced from the executive of Leclaire in 1918. The village of Leclaire was annexed by Edwardsville in 1934, ending the socialist experience.

Some Tolstoyans emigrated to Canada.

=== Europe ===
In Russia censorship meant that many of Tolstoy's non-fiction works in the 1880s and 1890s were published abroad first, either in Russian or in translation, delaying the author's influence in his country of birth. However, with Vladimir Chertkov (1854–1936) as a key promoter of Tolstoy's ideas, a movement started over the 1890s. The movement continued to grow after the writer's death and was at its strongest in the years immediately following the revolutions of 1917 with agricultural communities established in the provinces of Smolensk, Tver, Samara, Kursk, Perm and Kiev. The Tolstoyan communities that proliferated between 1917 and 1921 were eventually wiped out or stripped of their independence as collectivisation and ideological purges got under way in the late 1920s. Colonies, such as the Life and Labor Commune, relocated to Siberia to avoid being liquidated. Several Tolstoyan leaders, including Yakov Dragunovsky (1886–1937), were put on trial and then sent to the Gulag prison camps.

In England John Coleman Kenworthy of the Brotherhood Church established a colony at Purleigh, Essex in 1896. This community closed a few years later but its residents spawned the Whiteway Colony in Gloucestershire and Stapleton Colony in Yorkshire, both of which are still going today. Although given Whiteway soon abandoned Tolstoy's principles, it has been regarded by many, including Gandhi who visited in 1909, as a failed Tolstoyan experiment.

Johannes van der Veer was the key figure in the Dutch Tolstoyan movement, and Tolstoy directly addressed van der Veer's anti-war stances in an 1896 essay. In the Netherlands two colonies were started, a short-lived one at Bussum in North Holland and a more successful one at nearby Blaricum. The reasons attributed to the failure of Tolstoyan communities across Europe have included the personal incompatibility of the participants and a general lack of practical agricultural experience.

== Prominent followers ==
One of the prominent followers of Tolstoy was the celebrated philosopher Ludwig Wittgenstein. His interest in Tolstoy began in the First World War after he read his book, The Gospel in Brief. He carried this book with him everywhere and recommended it to others.

In particular, the pacifism of Tolstoy was very influential. Alexander Fodor wrote:

We know that [Tolstoy's] pacificism, his advocacy of passive resistance to evil through nonviolent means, has had incalculable influence on pacificist movements in general and on the philosophical and social views and programs of Mahatma Gandhi, Martin Luther King, and Cesar Chavez.

Another prominent follower of Tolstoy's teachings was Dorothy Day, an American social activist, and a founder of the pacifist Catholic Worker Movement.

== See also ==
- Anna Chertkova
- Christian anarchism
- Doukhobor
- Gandhism
- Jesuism
- Leo Tolstoy bibliography
- Life and Labor Commune
- New Monasticism
- New religious movement
- Purleigh Colony
- The Kingdom of God Is Within You, an 1894 non-fiction book by Leo Tolstoy
- Tuckton Colony
- Whiteway Colony
