= St Mary's Church, Hitchin =

Church in Hertfordshire, England

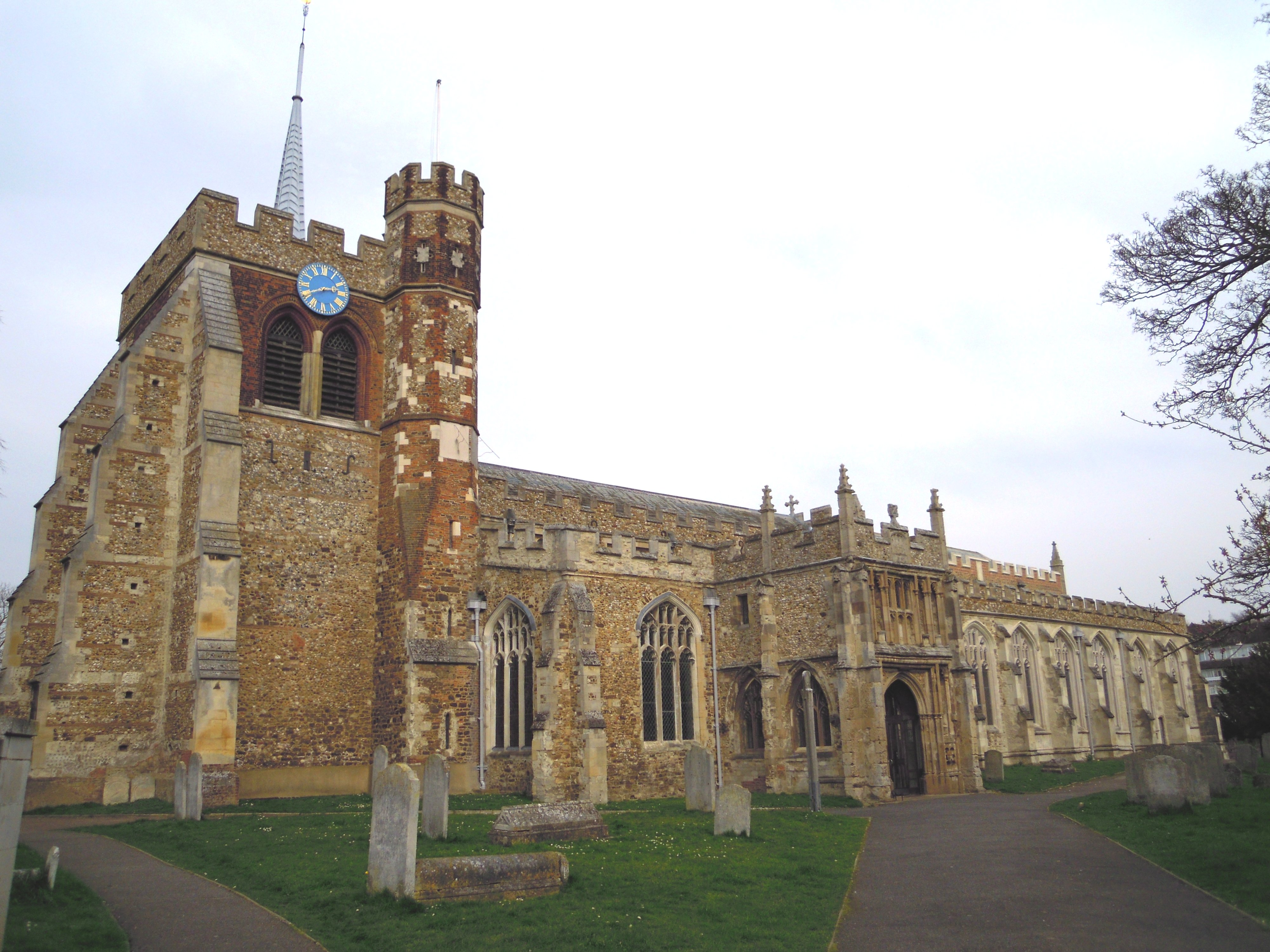
- St Mary's, viewed from the south-west

- Location in Hertfordshire
- 51°56′53″N 0°16′39″W
- OS grid reference: TL 18498 29120
- Country: England
- Denomination: Church of England
- Churchmanship: Central
- Website: stmaryshitchin.co.uk

History
- Status: Parish church

Architecture
- Functional status: Active

Administration
- Province: Province of Canterbury
- Diocese: Diocese of St Albans
- Archdeaconry: Archdeaconry of St Albans

Clergy
- Vicar: Christopher Bunce

St Mary's Church is a Church of England parish church in Hitchin, Hertfordshire, England.

St Mary's Church is the largest parish church in Hertfordshire, and is remarkably large for a town of the size of Hitchin — this has been cited as evidence of how Hitchin prospered from the wool trade. The present church stands on the site of two previous churches and dates from the 14th and 15th centuries, with its tower dating from around 1190. The church has been Grade I listed since 1951.

During the laying of a new floor in the church in 1911, foundations of a more ancient Saxon church building were found. In form, they appear to be a basilican church of a 7th-century type, with a later enlarged chancel and transepts, perhaps added in the 10th century. These may have been the remains of a Benedictine monastery said to have been first on the site and to have been founded by Offa, King of Mercia (r. 757–796).

== History ==
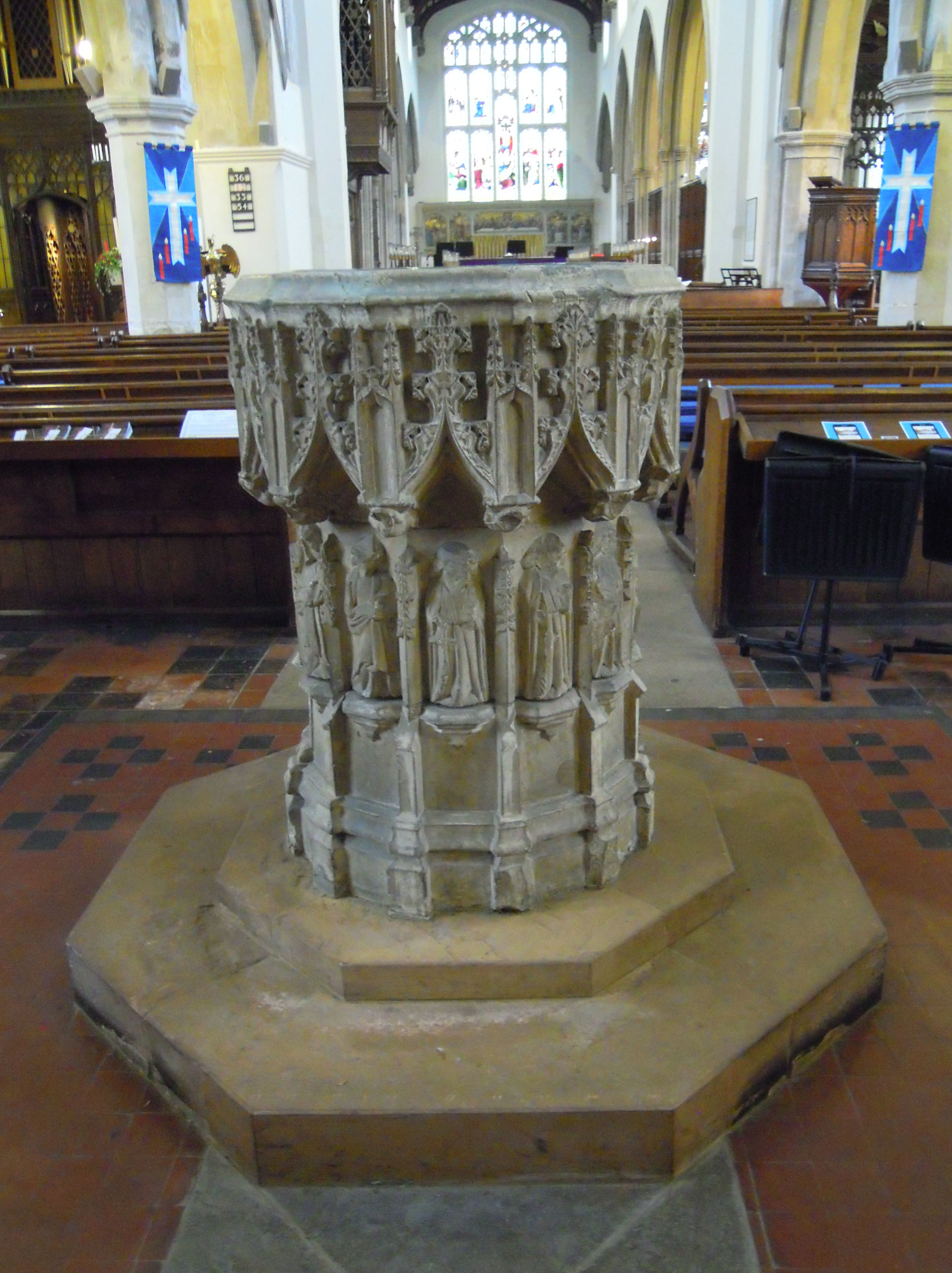
The baptismal font dates from about 1470

In 910 the church and its adjoining palace were burnt down and the monks left Hitchin for St Albans Abbey following which local people used stones from the ruined church to build a new parish church. In the Domesday Book of 1086 St Mary's is listed as the most important church in the Deanery of St. Albans. The church was partially destroyed during the 'Great Wind' of 1115 after which the nave had to be completely rebuilt; the church was struck by lightning in 1292 which caused great damage, while in 1298 the centre of the church collapsed as the result of an earthquake. Six years later in 1304, possibly weakened by the earthquake, the roof collapsed damaging monuments and relics inside the building. The church was rebuilt with flint, rubble and stone from Totternhoe in 1305. In 1220 the nuns and Bishop Hugh of Lincoln endowed a vicarage at the church.

The present church building dates mostly from the 14th and 15th centuries and was originally dedicated to St Andrew, but came to be known as The Church of St Mary due to the powerful and influential Guild of our Lady founded in the 15th century. The south porch, with its original door and described as "the chief glory of the church", was added in about 1450.

== Features ==
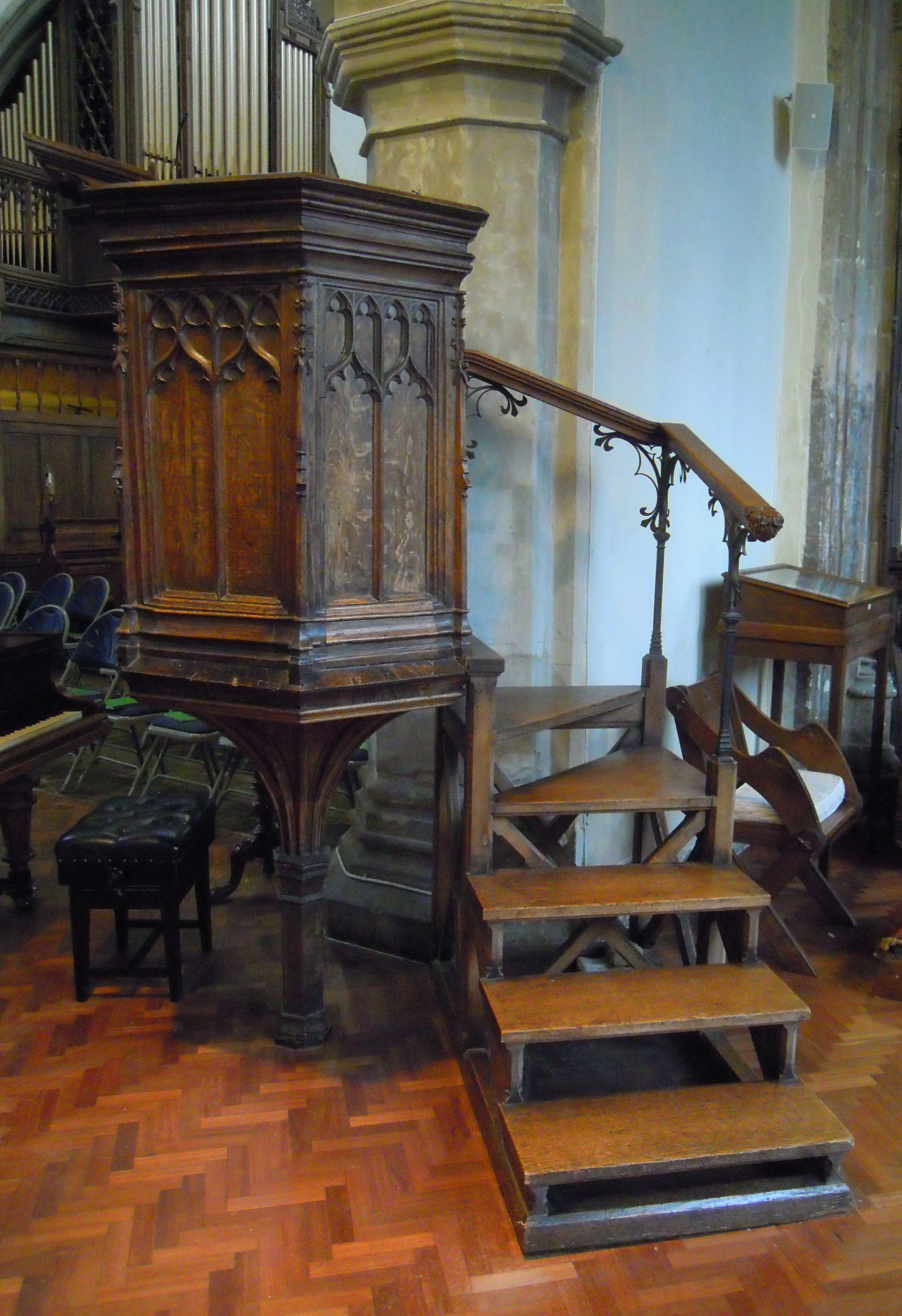
The pulpit dates from about 1500

Features surviving from the 15th century and of particular note are the baptismal font, which dates from about 1470 and around the base of which the figures of the Twelve Apostles were damaged by Puritan soldiers during the English Civil War when Oliver Cromwell garrisoned his troops in the church; the pulpit dates from about 1500 and no longer has its canopy, its ‘wine-glass‘ base or its clerk's desk.

The Angel Screen is considered one of the finest in the country and on its eastern side can still be found the fraternity stalls used by the Guild of 'Our Blessed Lady St Mary the Virgin'. The sundial on the south east corner of the ancient tower was erected in thanksgiving for the Restoration of Charles II in 1660.

The organ is a three-manual instrument built by J. W. Walker in 1871 and which was inaugurated by John Stainer. It has been rebuilt three times since then, most recently in 1958. The organ's carved oak case is by Laurence Arthur Turner and was installed in 1913.

Modern features include the altar rail with its trademark mouse carved by Robert 'Mouseman' Thompson.

== Notable events ==
The funeral services were held here for the conductor Sir Henry Wood, who died at the nearby Hitchin Hospital, and solicitor and Hitchin historian Reginald Hine.

In August 2015 windows at the church and those at St Paul's church in Letchworth were smashed in what police called a "religiously motivated attack." The cost of repair at St Mary's came to £10,000. Christopher Battison, aged 38, from Letchworth, was charged with the attack.

== Burials ==
- Bernard I de Balliol

== Gallery ==
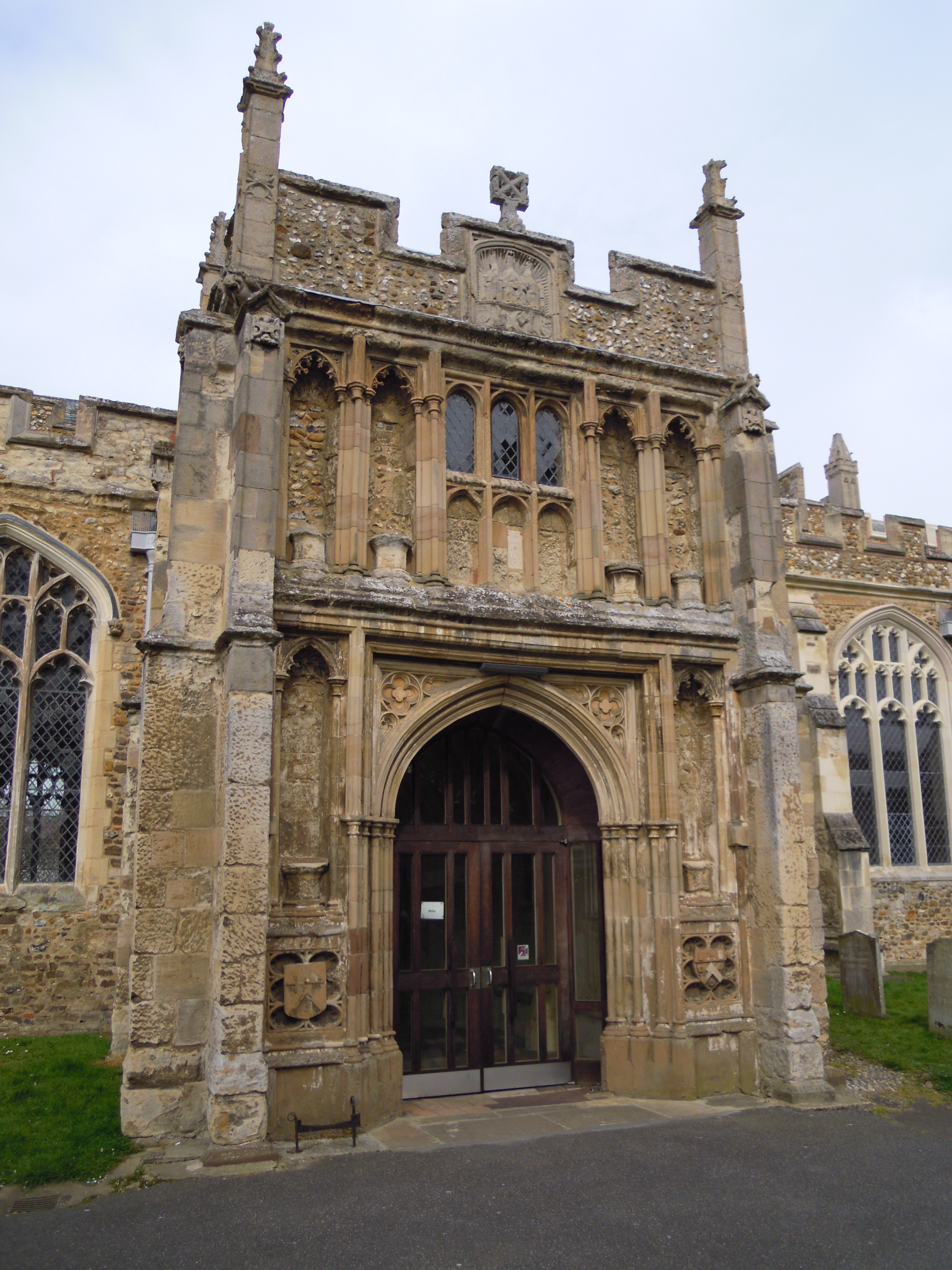
The South Porch of St Mary's Church

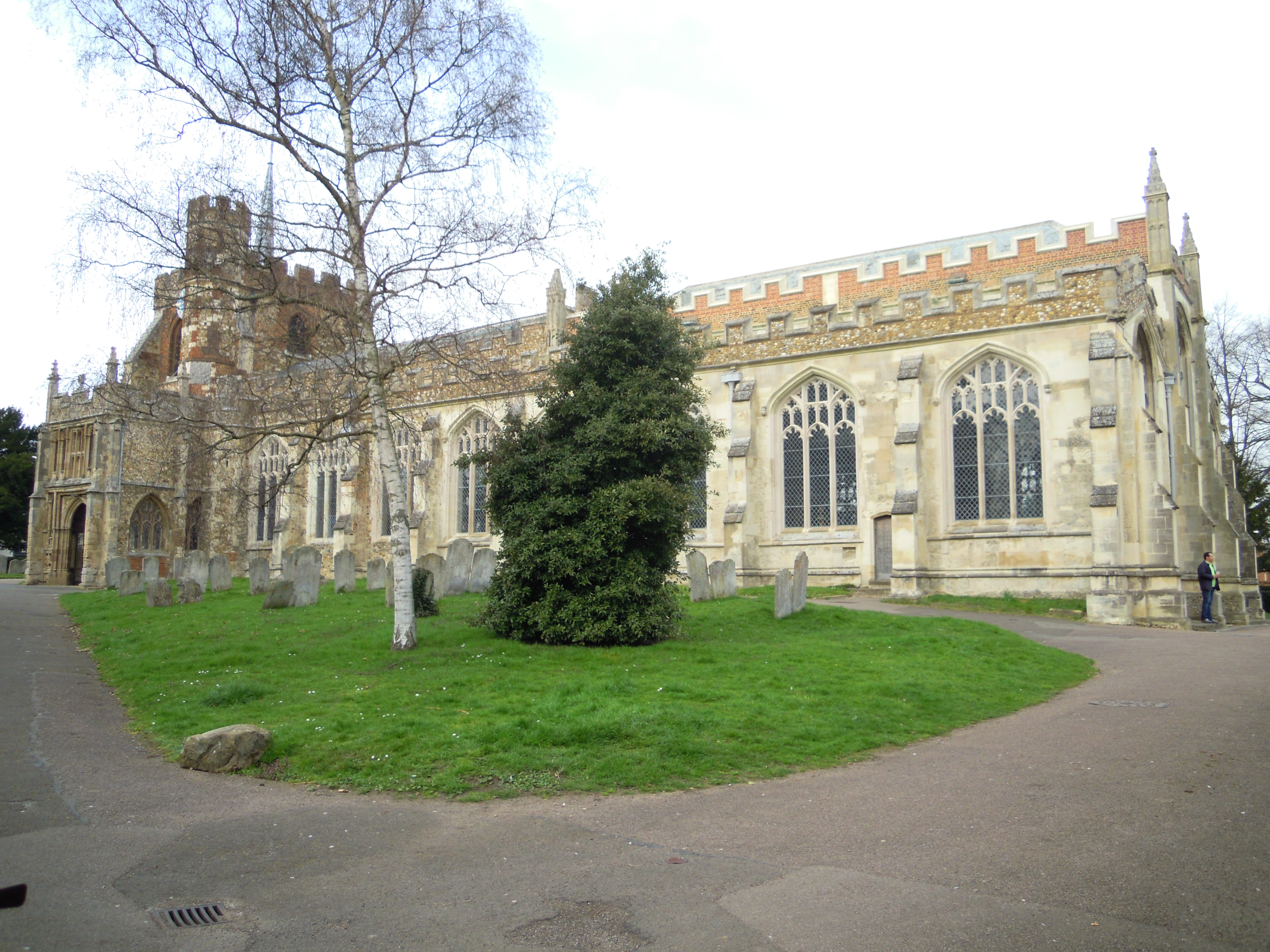
View from the side

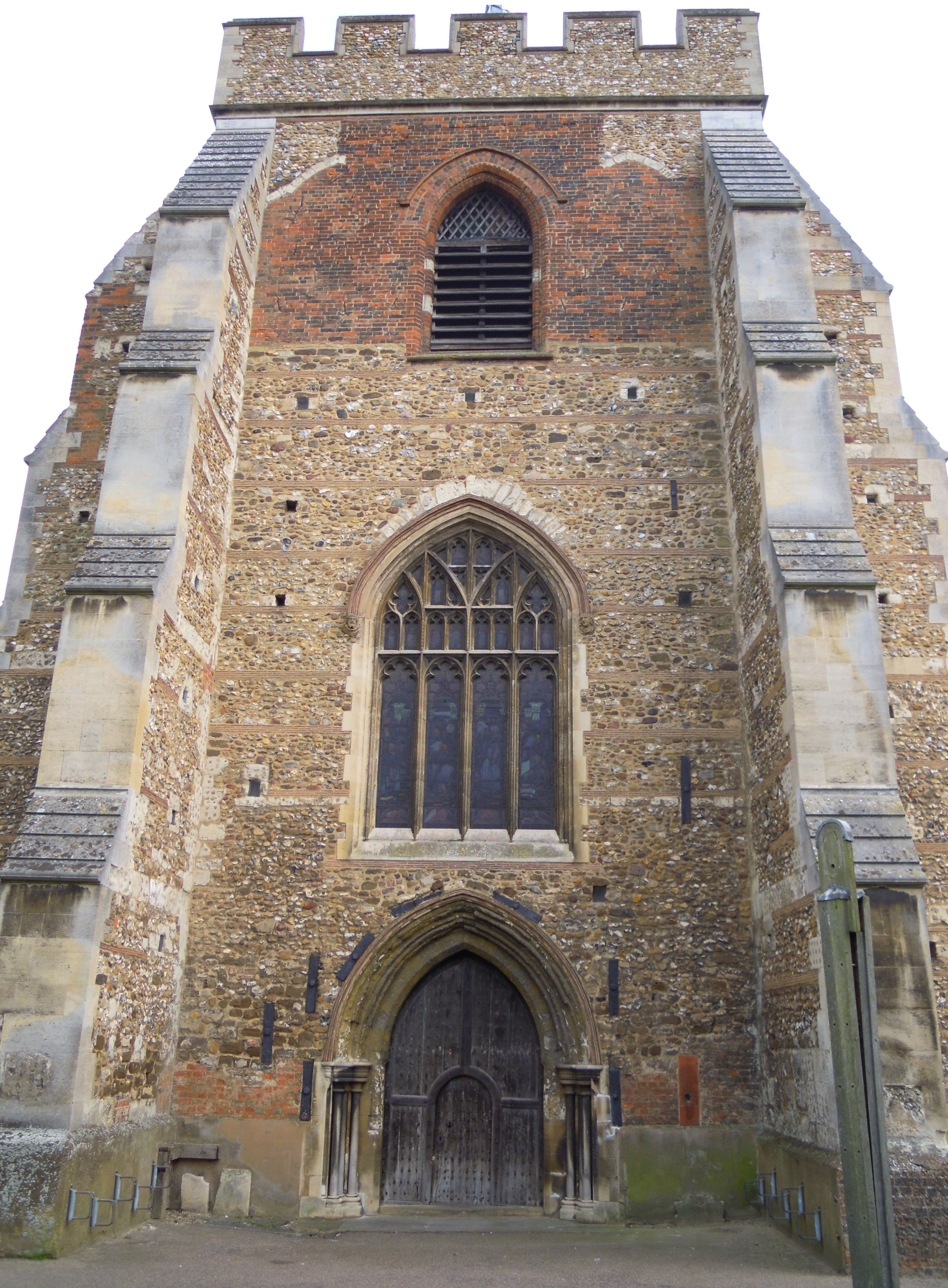
The Tower of St Mary's Church

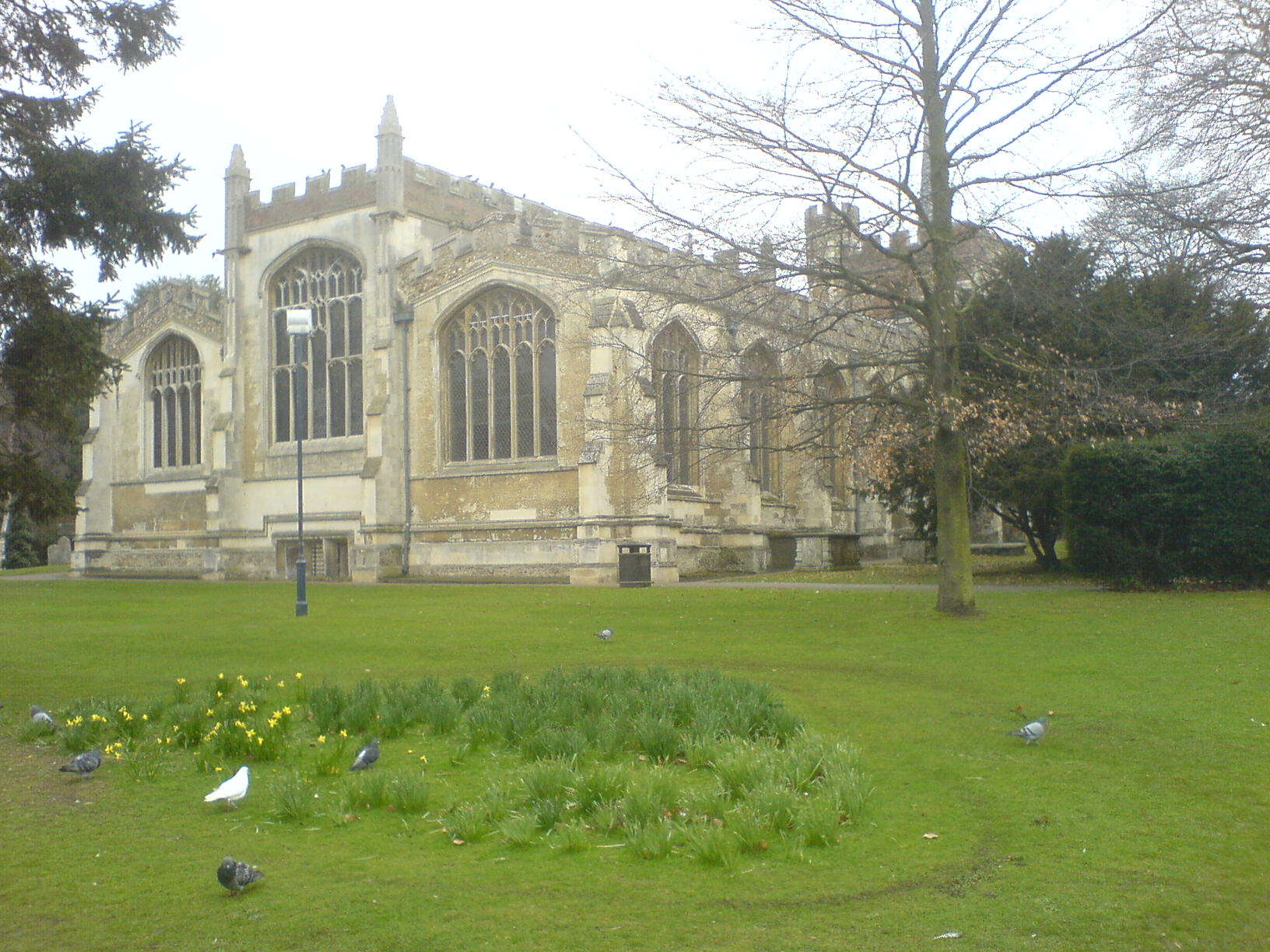
St Mary's church from the River Hiz

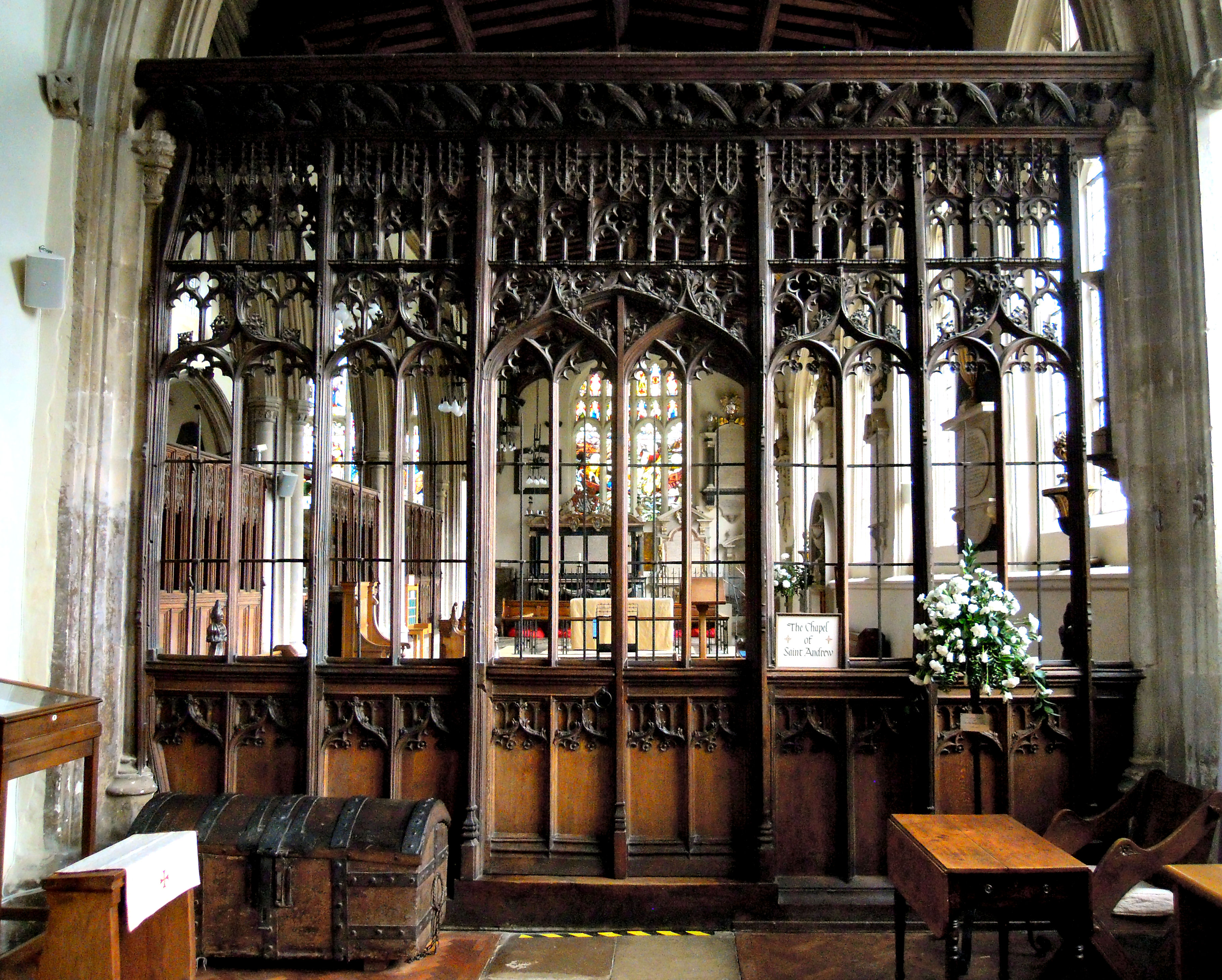
The Angel Screen is considered one of the finest in the country

== Notes and references ==
Bibliography

- Jones, Lawrence E; Tricker, Roy (1992). County Guide to English Churches. Newbury, Berkshire: Countryside Books. ISBN 978-1853061790.
