= Church of All Saints, Willian =

Church in Hertfordshire, England

Coordinates: 51.9609°N 0.2191°W

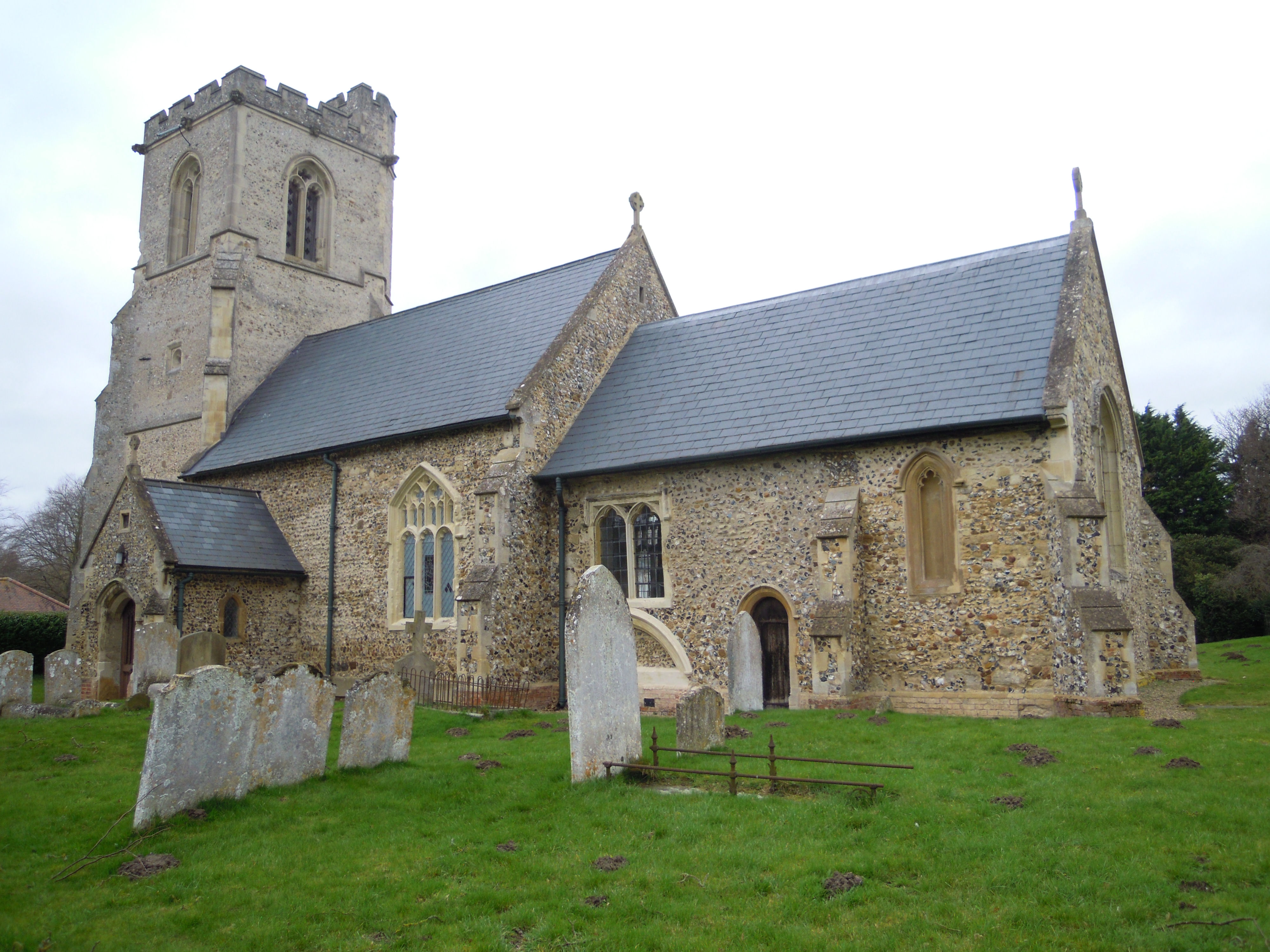
Church of All Saints, Willian

The Church of All Saints is the Anglican parish church for the village of Willian in Hertfordshire. The benefice is united with St Paul's church in nearby Letchworth, although each church has its own parish. It is in the Diocese of St Albans. The church has been a Grade II* listed building since 1954.

== The exterior ==
All Saints' dates back to at least Norman times and consists of a nave with two bays and a chancel dating to the 12th and 13th centuries, respectively. The tower and south porch are 15th century. The tower is of three stages with a stair turret and battlemented parapet and has eight gargoyles. The thin red tiles visible on the south side of the tower are thought to mark the day by day progress of the workmen. Major renovation of the tower was carried out in 1996 when seven of the eight gargoyles were replaced with replicas carved by Rattee and Kett. These represent opposites: Life and Death; Saint and the Devil: King and Queen, and a Lion and a Man. The clock was installed to commemorate the Diamond Jubilee of Queen Victoria in 1897; it was restored in 1991. The buttresses supporting the nave date to the 15th-century, while those supporting the chancel are 19th-century. The roof is of Welsh slate with coped gables, while the structure is built of flint and ironstone rubble walls with ashlar dressed stone and buttresses. The 14th and 15th century fenestration is in the Perpendicular style.

== Inside the church ==
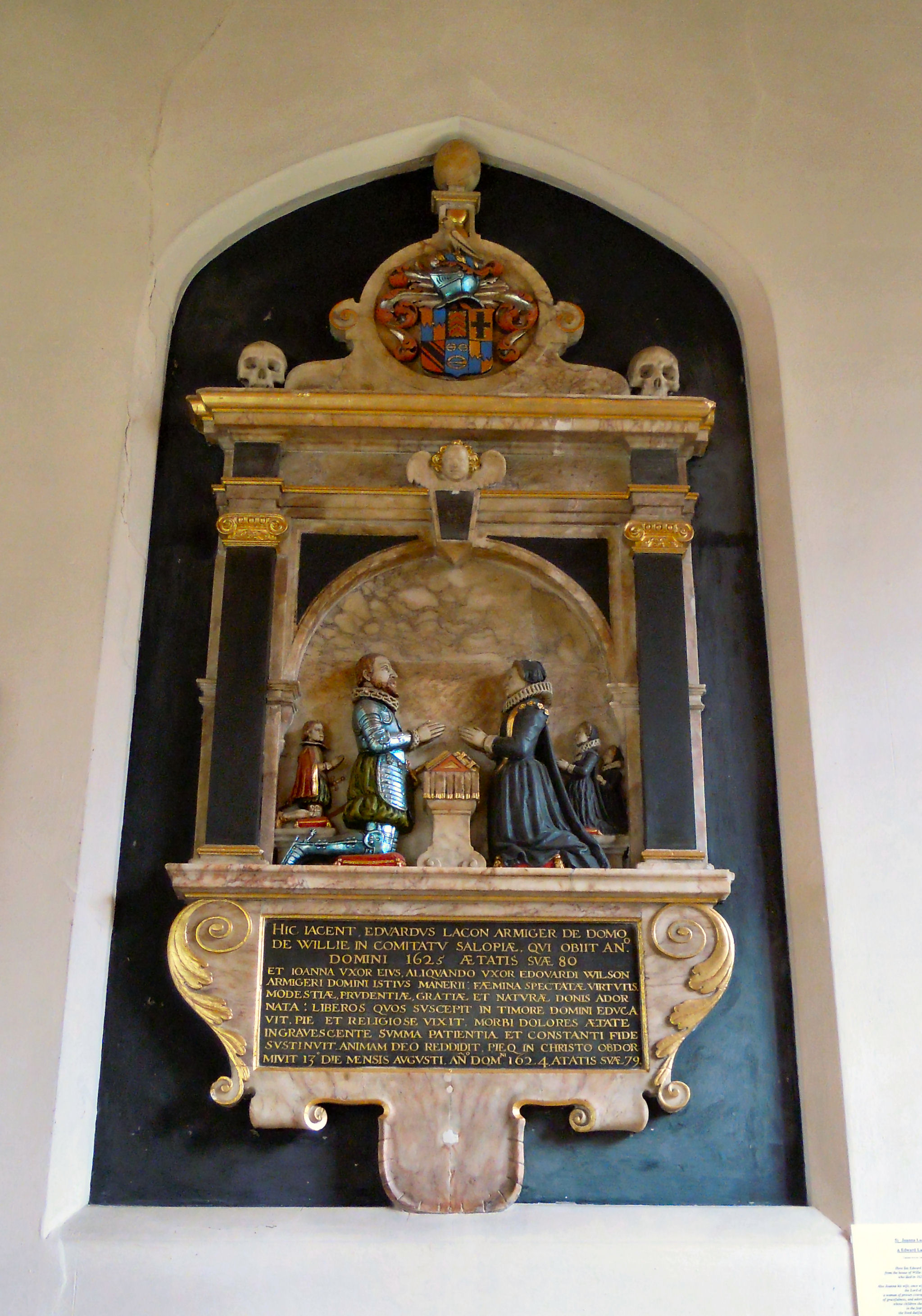
The tomb of Edward (died 1624) and Joanna Lacon (died 1625) in the chancel

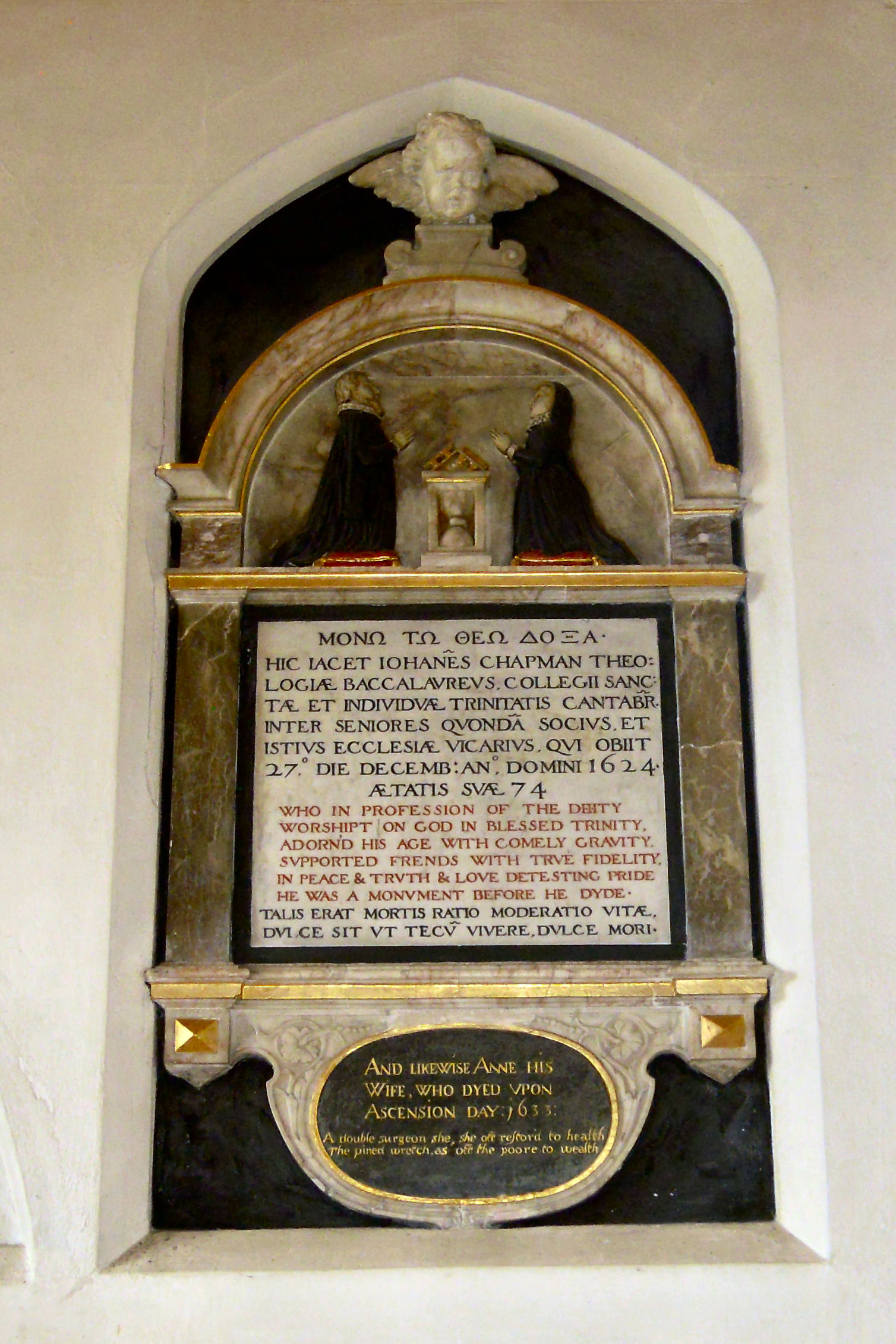
Tomb of Rev John Chapman (died 1624) and Anne Chapman (died 1633)

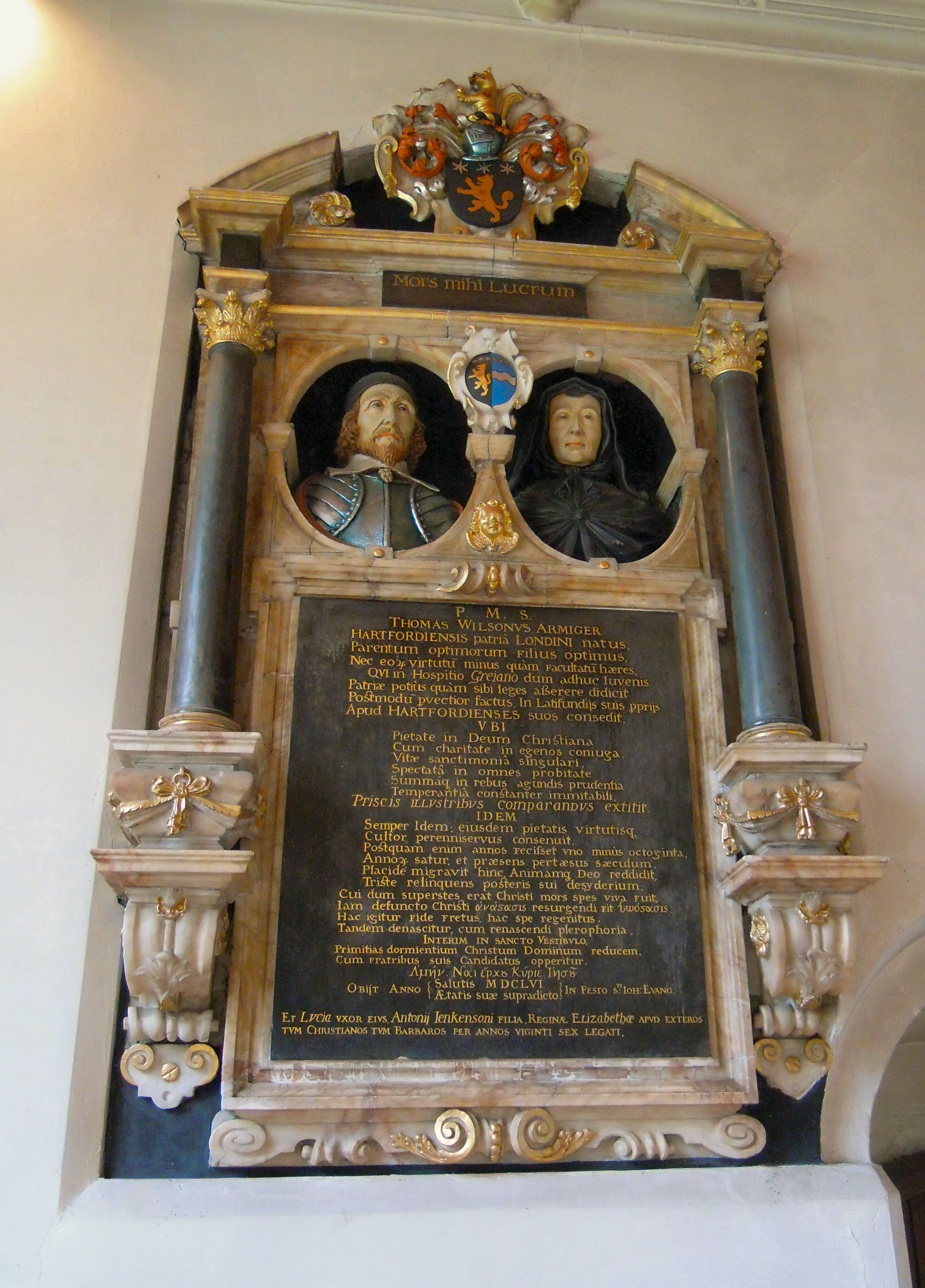
Tomb of Thomas and Lucy Wilson (1656)

The church's interior has a 19th-century timber barrel roof above both the nave and chancel, while the latter still has its original corbel masks and carved seats. The nave is high and light owing to work done in 1866-70 when the window opposite the porch was added and the roof raised. The two windows facing each other date to about 1430 although the stained glass in them is from 1918. The walls are from about 1100 to 1150. The free-standing communion table has a prominent position and behind it is a carving of an elephant and castle on the president's chair, which was made in 1974 using medieval woodwork already existing in the church; on a side panel is the head of John the Baptist on a platter. Recent research suggests that these carvings were originally made in about 1475 for St Andrew's church in Biggleswade and were brought to Willian in about 1830.

There is a monumental brass to Richard Golden (died 1446), priest at Willian 1416–1466, while the walls are adorned with good quality monuments, those in the chancel being to Edward and Joan Lacon (died 1625 and 1624), John Chapman (died 1624) and Thomas Wilson (died 1656). The latter is a fine and rare example. These monuments were cleaned and some were repainted in 1974. The newer of the two lecterns was given in memory of Samuel Valentine, who died in 1974; the older one was given in 1870 by Thomas Legh Claughton, the Bishop of Rochester in whose diocese Willian then lay. The original 15th-century rood screen has been removed. Above the tower arch are the Royal Arms which were probably placed there during the restoration of 1870. At the base of the tower the Ellacombe Chime bell-ringing apparatus on the wall enables one person to ring all six bells. The oldest bell in its original state is dated 1662. The organ was made by J. W. Walker & Sons Ltd in 1864, and was refurbished in 1986. The Victorian baptismal font is believed to be the fourth in the church. Its predecessor was taken to the Rectory where it was used as a plant container.

== Notable burials ==
Buried in the churchyard is Annie Jane Lawrence, who built The Cloisters in nearby Letchworth. Here too lies Bernard George Ellis GC, who was awarded the Albert Medal in 1919, translated to the George Cross in 1970. Also here are five graves maintained by the Commonwealth War Graves Commission - one from World War I and four from World War II.

== Gallery ==
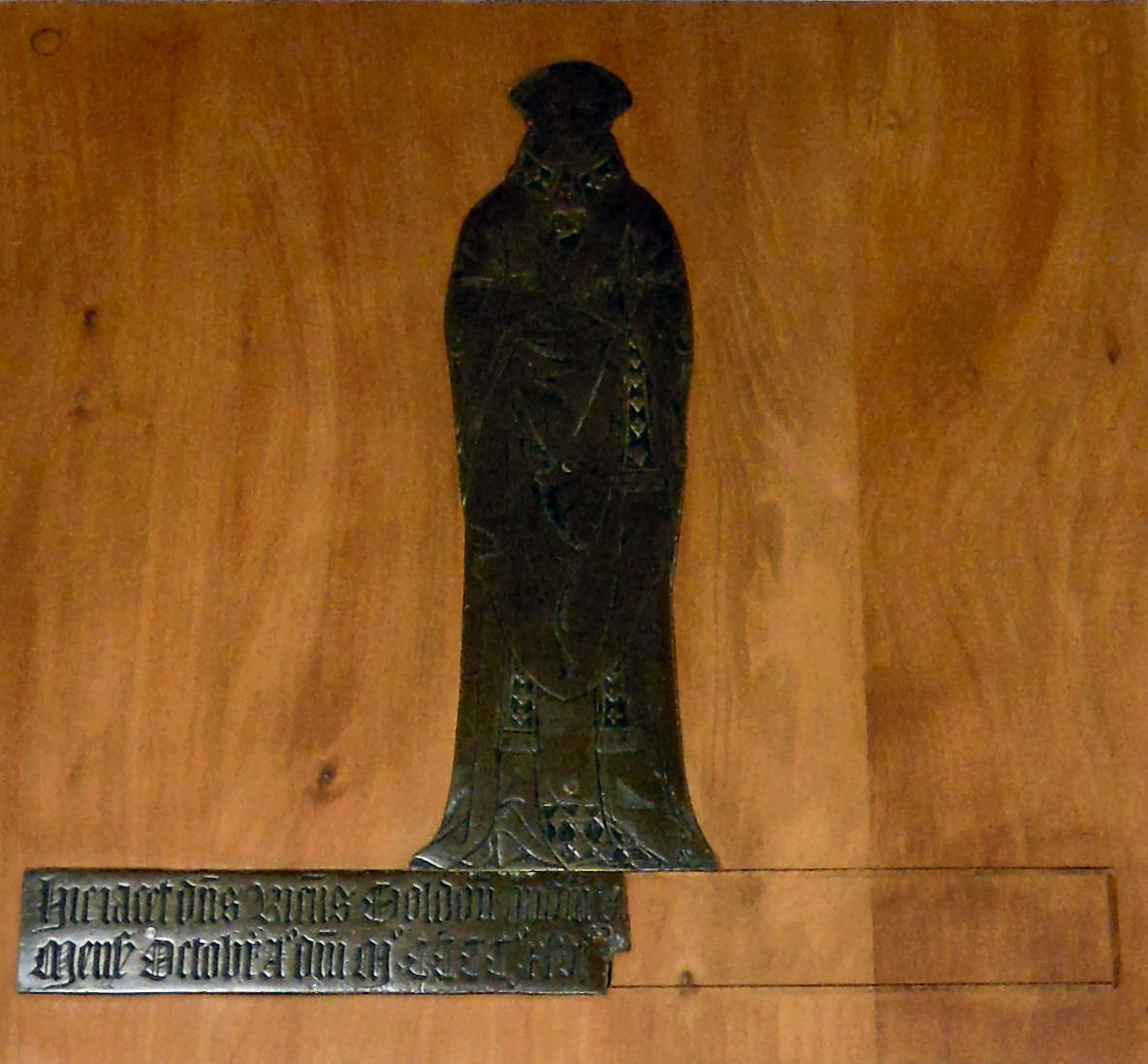
Monumental brass to Richard Golden (died 1446)

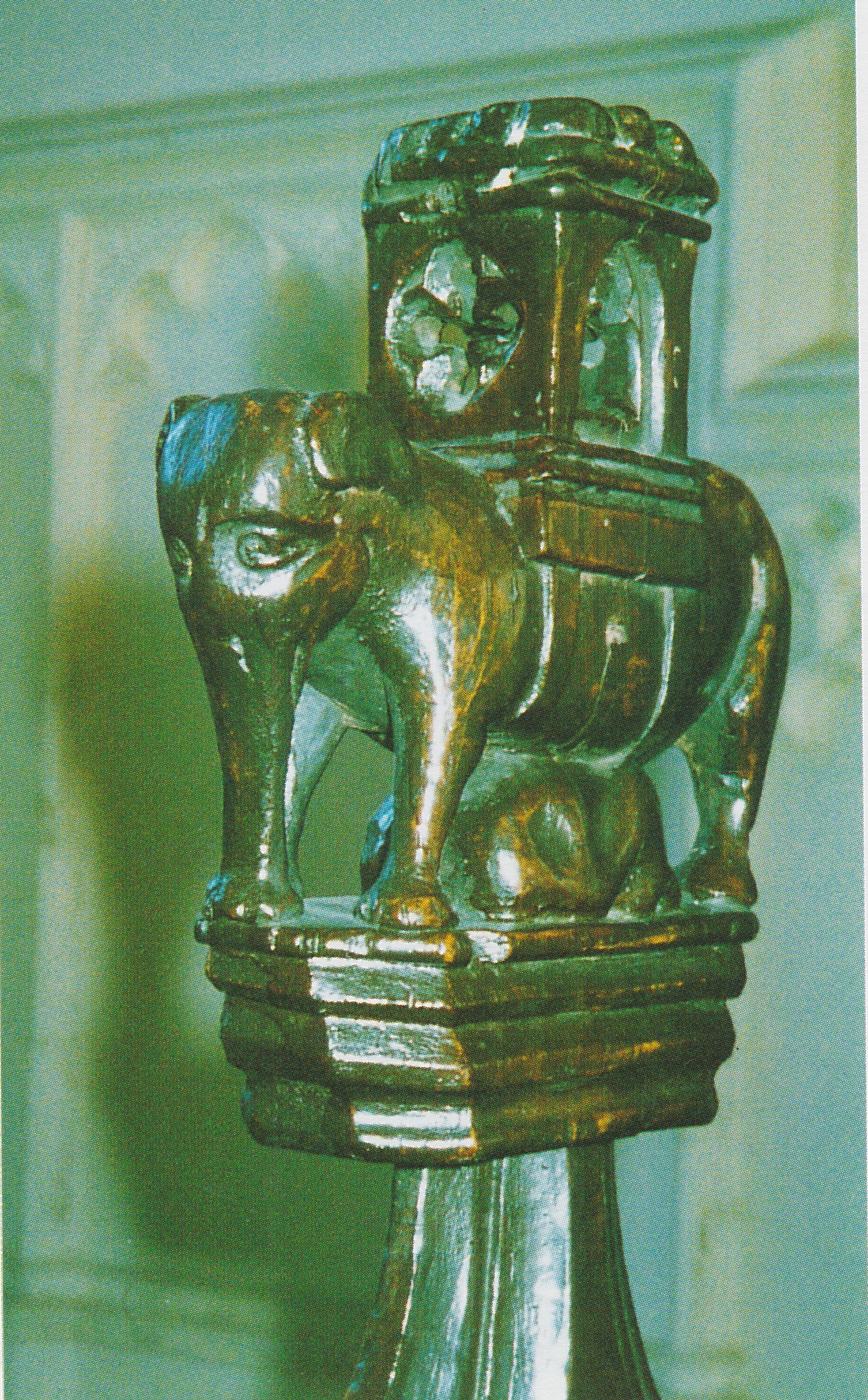
Elephant and castle carving of about 1475 on a modern chair made using medieval woodwork
