= Church of St Paul, Letchworth =

Church of St Paul
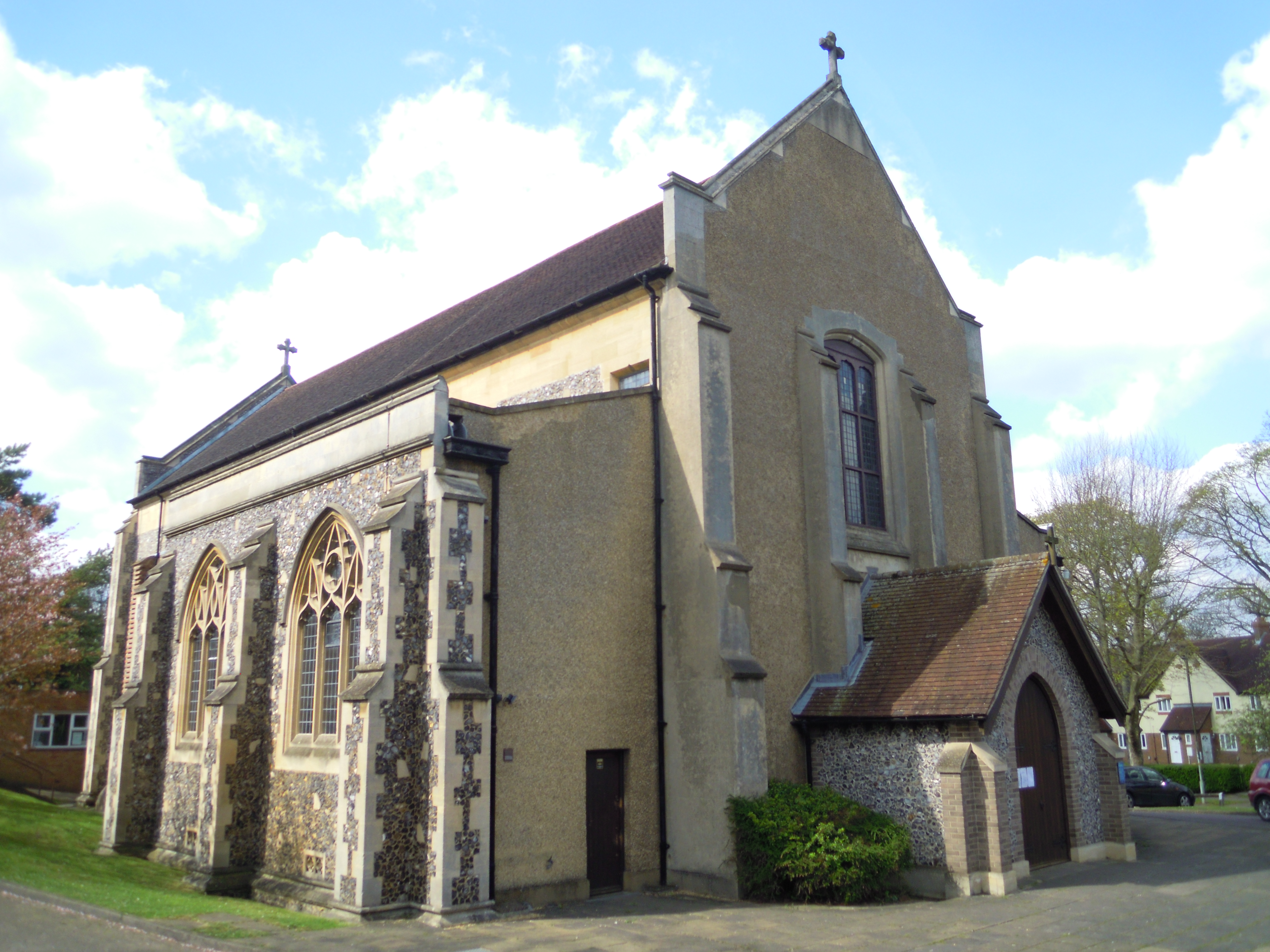
- The Church of St Paul in Letchworth in 2017
- Church of St Paul
- 51.97495°N 0.21617°W
- OS grid reference: TL 22623 32221
- Location: Letchworth, Hertfordshire
- Country: England
- Denomination: Anglican
- Website: stpaulsletchworth.co.uk

History
- Status: Parish church
- Consecrated: 3 May 1924

Architecture
- Functional status: Active
- Architect: Arthur Heron Ryan Tenison
- Groundbreaking: 10 October 1923

Administration
- Diocese: St Albans

Clergy
- Vicar: Reverend Jeni McQuaid Reverend Nick Smith

The Church of St Paul in Letchworth in Hertfordshire is the Anglican parish church for the Letchworth Gate area of the town at the top of Pixmore Way. Dating from 1923, with later extensions, it is a 'daughter church' of the nearby Church of All Saints in Willian and comes under the Diocese of St Albans. Built as a 'Victory' church following World War I, the building is the largest war memorial in Hertfordshire.

== History ==
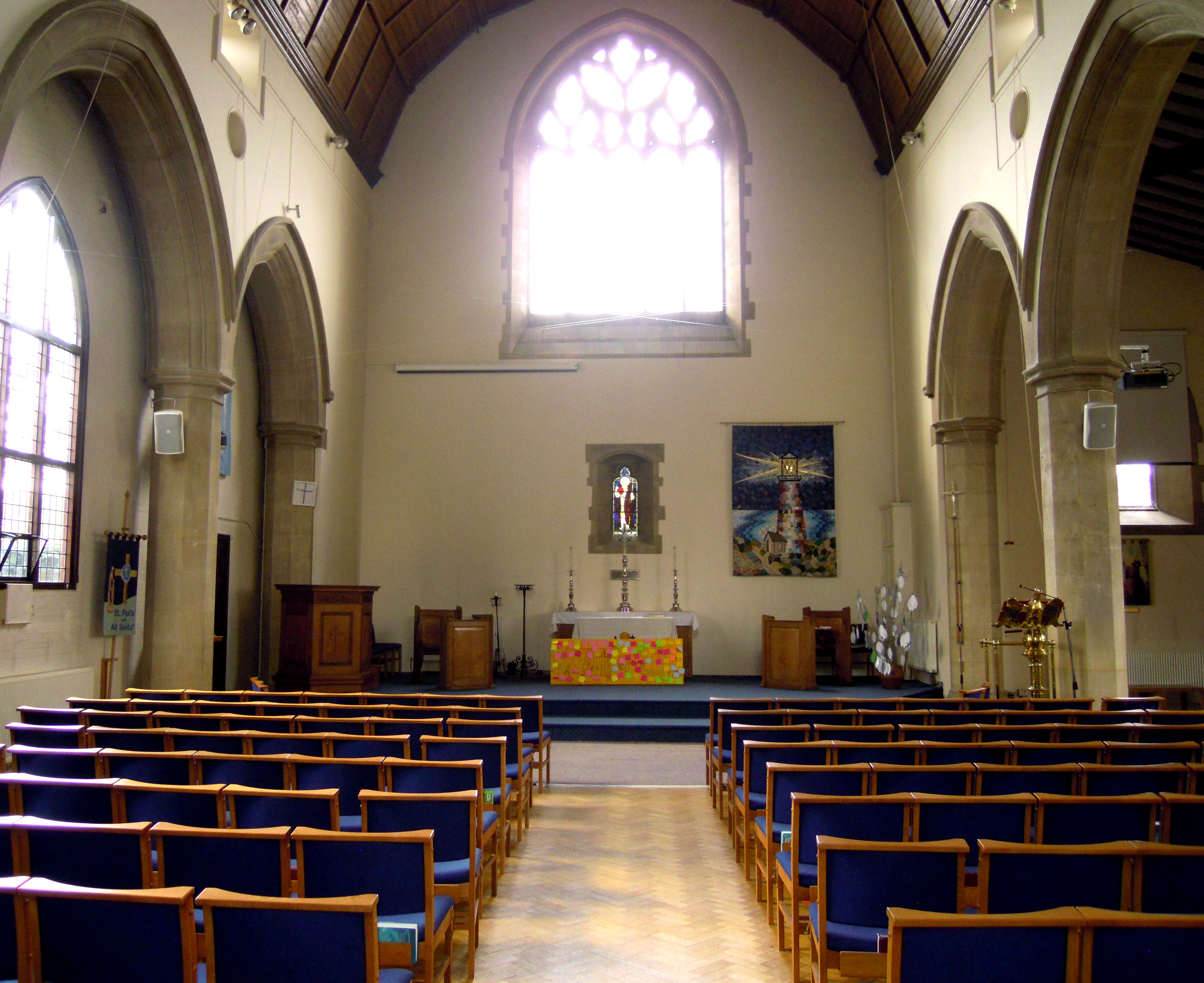
Looking West in St Paul's church

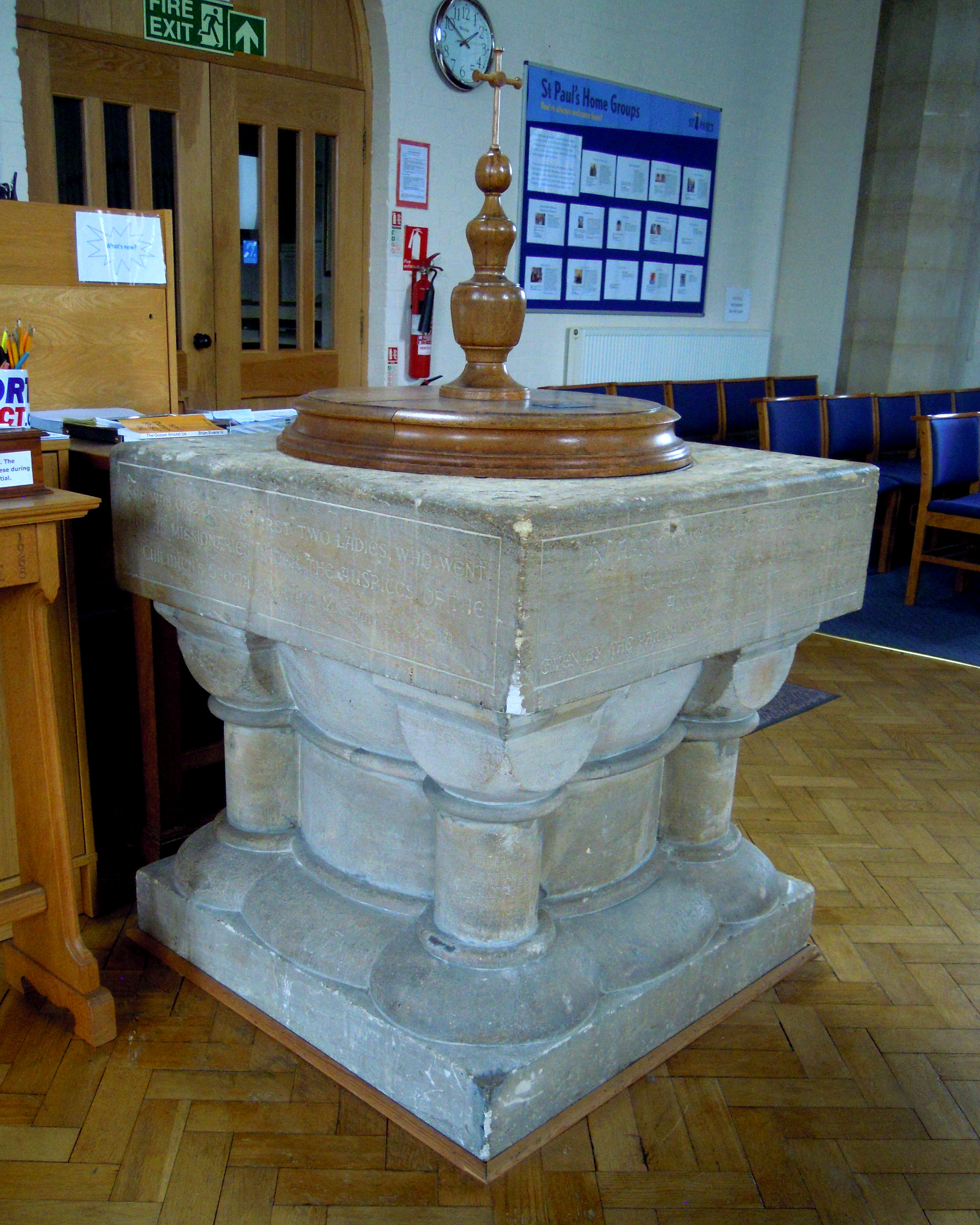
The baptismal font dates to 1853

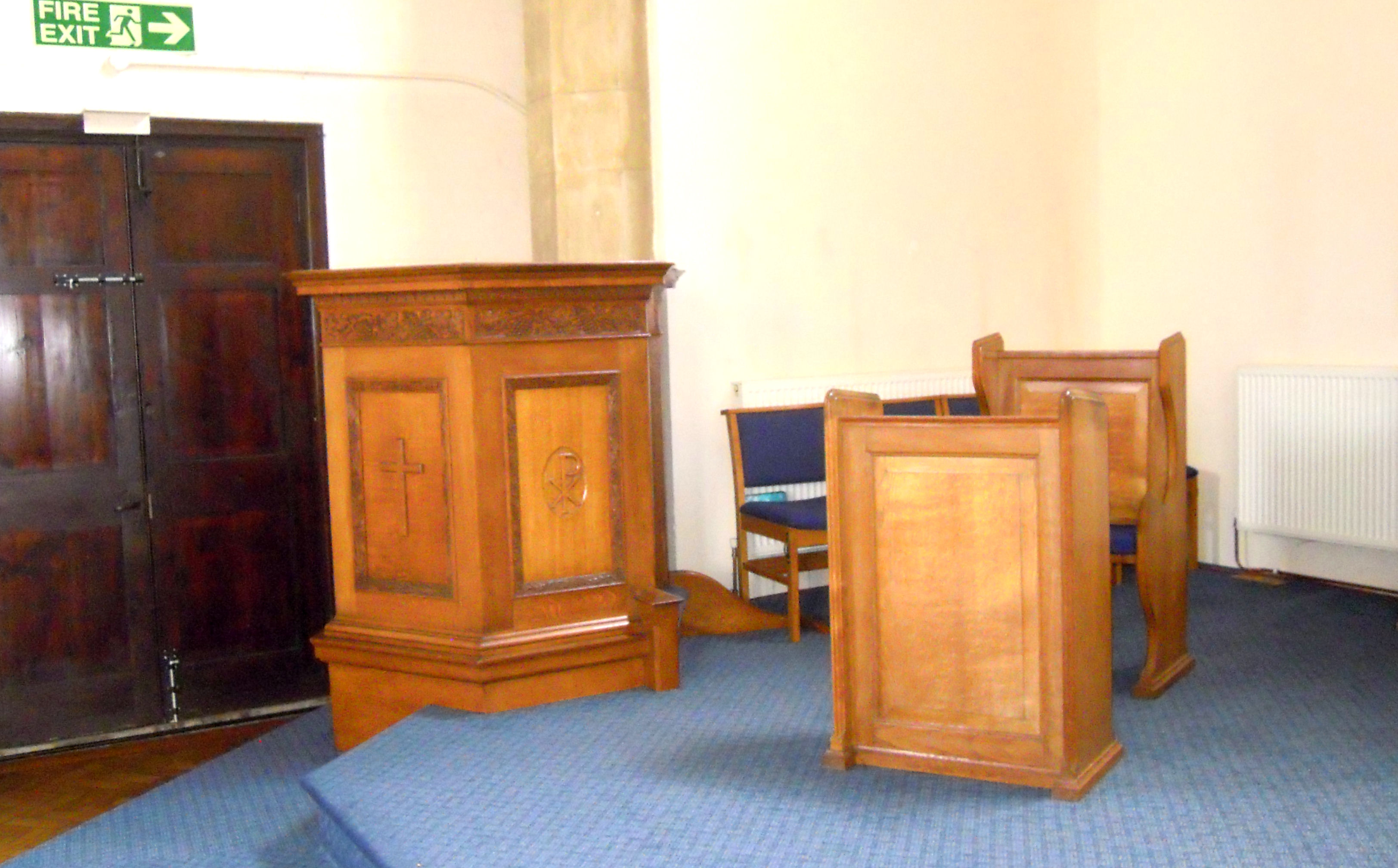
The boarded in pulpit

When Ebenezer Howard set up his first garden city in Letchworth in 1903 the Church of England gave little thought to the spiritual needs of the citizens of the new town by building a central Anglican place of worship. The site being developed by Howard's First Garden City Ltd. crossed the parish boundaries of three local ancient village churches: St Mary's church, St Nicholas, Norton, and All Saints, Willian. When in 1917 the Revd Montagu Sharpin Swatman was appointed to the living of Willian he wished to set up a church in Letchworth's Pixmore area in the expectation of providing a more accessible church for the people of the new garden city, and to provide spiritual sanctuary from the war. He initially hoped to quickly install a temporary structure. However it became apparent this was not possible as the Church of England did not own land in the new development.

Swatman called a meeting at the end of the war in November 1918 to discuss building a permanent church which was attended by 28 people who donated £29 5s. In 1919 the Diocese of St Albans bought a piece of land bought from the First Garden City Company. Swatman now had a site on which to build a church. It was decided to build a 'Victory Church' a functioning church which would also function as a memorial of the victory at the end of World War I. The architect Arthur Heron Ryan Tenison (1861-1930) was commissioned to produce a design described by Nikolaus Pevsner as "an ambitious project... A conventional Decorated Gothic style was adopted with flint walls and stone dressings with conventional gothic traceried windows." Tenison's design for the church was accepted for exhibition at the Royal Academy of Arts in 1921. A Garden City 'Victory' Church Appeal was launched in 1921 which by October had raised £2,000. At this time it was decided that the new church would be dedicated to St Paul.

Eventually, through a variety of fund-raising activities £5,000 was raised from the parishioners of Willian as well as the residents of the new garden city. This allowed construction of the new church to begin, with the foundation stone being laid on 10 October 1923 by the Marchioness of Salisbury. Work on the first section of the building was completed including three and a half bays of the nave with arcades at the sides. This first section was consecrated by Michael Furse, the Bishop of St Albans on 3 May 1924. A tower was intended but was never built.

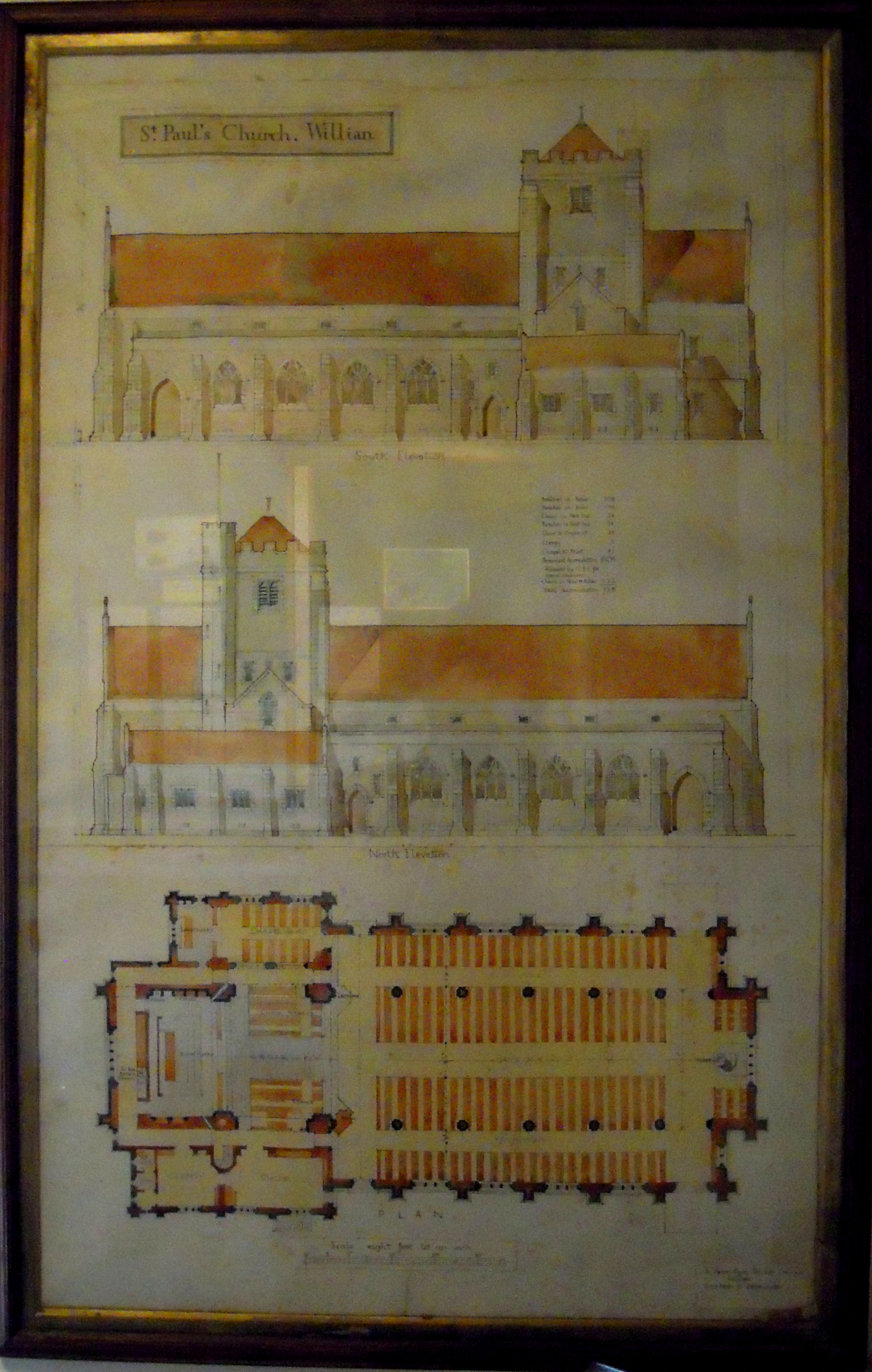
Tenison's original design was never completed

By 1924 the church was becoming too small for its growing congregation and work on an extension began in early 1931, with two further bays being added to the nave and adding two single bays on both sides, that on the south to house the organ and that on the north to act as a vestry, with a temporary wall being added in the east. This extension was dedicated on 18 December 1931. The baptismal font was found in pieces in a builder's yard in 1934 having been removed from St Albans Abbey, where it had been installed in 1853. The font was obtained for the price of transporting it to St Paul's where it was installed and dedicated to the memory of the late Mrs Evelyn Swatman.

By 1938 the church needed to be extended again, and an appeal was launched to raise the required £1,000; this sum was reached by 1940 and the north aisle was finished, a vestibule built and the roofing of the nave completed. In 1958 a Church Hall was built at 179 Pixmore Way, immediately west of the church.

St Paul's Church remained a chapel of ease within the ecclesiastical parish of Willian until 17 January 1963, when a new ecclesiastical parish of "Saint Paul, Letchworth" was created. On 8 June 1977 the two ecclesiastical parishes of Willian and Letchworth St Paul were brought under a united benefice, allowing them to be served by the same clergy whilst remaining separate ecclesiastical parishes.

In 1989 the church was reordered, turning the seating around from facing the east to facing the west. At about the same time a new smaller altar was installed and new communion rails fitted. The pulpit was boarded in and the baptismal font moved to the northeast corner of the church.

In August 2015 windows at the church and those at St Mary's church in Hitchin were smashed in what police called a "religiously motivated attack." A local man was charged with the attack.

In February 2022 the boarded in pulpit was removed.

At the end of 2023, the north aisle was (is being) rebuilt to be made safer.

At the end of 2023 they donated their chairs to another church and put in new wooden chairs making the place look newer.
