= Utopian socialism =

Political theory concerned with imagined socialist societies

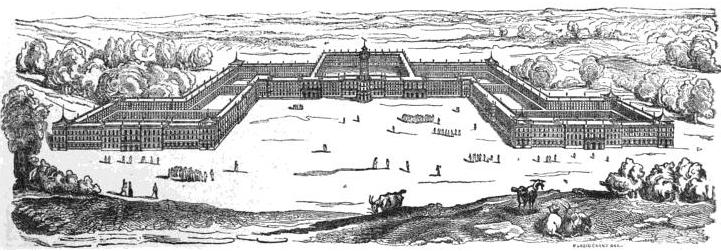
Phalanstère, a type of building designed by Charles Fourier

"Utopian socialism" is the term often used to describe the first current of modern socialism and socialist thought as exemplified by the work of Henri de Saint-Simon, Charles Fourier, Étienne Cabet, and Robert Owen. Utopian socialism is often described as the presentation of visions and outlines for imaginary or futuristic ideal and socialist societies that pursue ideals of positive inter-personal relationships separate from capitalist mechanisms. However, later socialists such as the Marxists and the critics of socialism both disparaged utopian socialism as not being grounded in actual material conditions of existing society. Utopian socialist visions of ideal societies compete with revolutionary and social democratic movements.

Later socialists have applied the term utopian socialism to socialists who lived in the first quarter of the 19th century. They used the term as a pejorative in order to dismiss the ideas of the earlier thinkers as fanciful and unrealistic. Ethical socialism, a similar school of thought that emerged in the early 20th century, makes the case for socialism on moral grounds and is sometimes also disparaged.

The anarchists and Marxists who dismissed utopian socialism did so because utopian socialists generally did not believe that class struggle or social revolution was necessary for socialism to emerge. Utopian socialists believed that people of all classes could voluntarily adopt their plan for society if it were presented convincingly. Cooperative socialism could be established among like-minded people in small communities that would demonstrate the feasibility of their plan for the broader society. Because of this tendency, utopian socialism was also related to classical radicalism, a left-wing liberal ideology.

== Development ==
In The Poverty of Philosophy, Marx criticized the economic and philosophical arguments of Proudhon set forth in The System of Economic Contradictions, or The Philosophy of Poverty. Marx accused Proudhon of wanting to rise above the bourgeoisie. In the history of Marx's thought and Marxism, this work is pivotal in the distinction between the concepts of utopian socialism and what Marx and the Marxists claimed as scientific socialism. Although utopian socialists shared few political, social, or economic perspectives, Marx and Engels argued that they shared certain intellectual characteristics. In The Communist Manifesto, Marx and Friedrich Engels wrote:

The undeveloped state of the class struggle, as well as their own surroundings, causes Socialists of this kind to consider themselves far superior to all class antagonisms. They want to improve the condition of every member of society, even that of the most favored. Hence, they habitually appeal to society at large, without distinction of class; nay, by preference, to the ruling class. For how can people, when once they understand their system, fail to see it in the best possible plan of the best possible state of society? Hence, they reject all political, and especially all revolutionary, action; they wish to attain their ends by peaceful means, and endeavor, by small experiments, necessarily doomed to failure, and by the force of example, to pave the way for the new social Gospel.

Marx and Engels associated utopian socialism with communitarian socialism which similarly sees the establishment of small intentional communities as both a strategy for achieving and the final form of a socialist society. Marx and Engels used the term scientific socialism to describe the type of socialism they saw themselves developing. According to Engels, socialism was not "an accidental discovery of this or that ingenious brain, but the necessary outcome of the struggle between two historically developed classes, namely the proletariat and the bourgeoisie. Its task was no longer to manufacture a system of society as perfect as possible, but to examine the historical-economic succession of events from which these classes and their antagonism had of necessity sprung, and to discover in the economic conditions thus created the means of ending the conflict". Critics have argued that utopian socialists who established experimental communities were in fact trying to apply the scientific method to human social organization and were therefore not utopian. On the basis of Karl Popper's definition of science as "the practice of experimentation, of hypothesis and test", Joshua Muravchik argued that "Owen and Fourier and their followers were the real 'scientific socialists.' They hit upon the idea of socialism, and they tested it by attempting to form socialist communities". By contrast, Muravchik further argued that Marx made untestable predictions about the future and that Marx's view that socialism would be created by impersonal historical forces may lead one to conclude that it is unnecessary to strive for socialism because it will happen anyway.

Social unrest between the employee and employer in a society, resulting from the growth of productive forces such as technology and natural resources, is the main causes of social and economic development. These productive forces require a mode of production, or an economic system, that's based around private property rights and institutions that determine the wage for labor. Additionally, the capitalist rulers control the modes of production. This ideological economic structure allows the bourgeoises to undermine the worker's sensibility of their place in society, being that the bourgeoises rule the society in their own interests. These rulers of society exploit the relationship between labor and capital, allowing for them to maximize their profit. To Marx and Engels, the profiteering through the exploitation of workers is the core issue of capitalism, explaining their beliefs for the oppression of the working class. Capitalism will reach a certain stage, one of which it cannot progress society forward, resulting in the seeding of socialism. As a socialist, Marx theorized the internal failures of capitalism. He described how the tensions between the productive forces and the modes of production would lead to the downfall of capitalism through a social revolution. Leading the revolution would be the proletariat, being that the preeminence of the bourgeoise would end. Marx's vision of his society established that there would be no classes, freedom of mankind, and the opportunity of self-interested labor to rid any alienation.

Since the mid-19th century, Engels overtook utopian socialism in terms of intellectual development and number of adherents. At one time almost half the population of the world lived under regimes that claimed to be Marxist. Currents such as Owenism and Fourierism attracted the interest of numerous later authors but failed to compete with the now dominant Marxist and Anarchist schools on a political level. It has been noted that they exerted a significant influence on the emergence of new religious movements such as spiritualism and occultism.

== In literature and in practice ==
Utopian socialist pamphlet of Swiss social medical doctor Rudolf Sutermeister (1802–1868)

Edward Bellamy (1850–1898) published Looking Backward in 1888, a utopian romance novel about a future socialist society. In Bellamy's utopia, property was held in common and money replaced with a system of equal credit for all. Valid for a year and non-transferable between individuals, credit expenditure was tracked via "credit-cards" (which bear no resemblance to modern credit cards which are tools of debt-finance). Labour was compulsory from age 21 to 40 and organised via various departments of an Industrial Army to which most citizens belonged. Working hours were cut drastically due to technological advances (including organisational). People were expected to be motivated by a Religion of Solidarity, and criminal behavior was treated as a form of mental illness or "atavism". The book ranked as a second or third best seller of its time (after Uncle Tom's Cabin and Ben Hur). In 1897, Bellamy published a sequel entitled Equality as a reply to his critics and which lacked the Industrial Army and other authoritarian aspects.

William Morris (1834–1896) published News from Nowhere in 1890, partly as a response to Bellamy's Looking Backward, which he equated with the socialism of Sydney Webb and other Fabians. Morris' vision of a future socialist society was centred around his concept of useful work as opposed to useless toil and the redemption of human labour. Morris believed all work should be artistic, in the sense that the worker should find it both pleasurable and an outlet for creativity. Morris' conception of labour thus bears strong resemblance to Fourier's, while Bellamy's (the reduction of labour) is more akin to that of Saint-Simon or in aspects to Marx.

The Brotherhood Church in Britain and the Life and Labor Commune in Russia were based on the Christian anarchist ideas of Leo Tolstoy (1828–1910). Pierre-Joseph Proudhon (1809–1865) and Peter Kropotkin (1842–1921) wrote about anarchist forms of socialism in their books. Proudhon wrote What is Property? (1840) and The System of Economic Contradictions, or The Philosophy of Poverty (1847). Kropotkin wrote The Conquest of Bread (1892) and Fields, Factories and Workshops (1912). Many of the anarchist collectives formed in Spain during the Spanish Civil War, especially in Aragon and Catalonia, were based on their ideas.

Many participants in the historical kibbutz movement in Palestine in the Ottoman Empire, then later Mandatory Palestine under British occupation and later Israel were motivated by utopian socialist ideas. Augustin Souchy (1892–1984) spent most of his life investigating and participating in many kinds of socialist communities. Souchy wrote about his experiences in his autobiography Beware! Anarchist! Behavioral psychologist B. F. Skinner (1904–1990) published Walden Two in 1948. The Twin Oaks Community was originally based on his ideas. Ursula K. Le Guin (1929–2018) wrote about an impoverished anarchist society in her book The Dispossessed, published in 1974, in which anarchists avoid a bloody revolution by leaving their home planet to go to colonize a barely habitable moon.

== Related concepts ==
Classless modes of production in hunter-gatherer societies are referred to as primitive communism by Marxists to stress their classless nature.

Some communities of the modern intentional community movement such as kibbutzim could be categorized as utopian socialist. Some religious communities such as the Hutterites are categorized as utopian religious socialists.

== Notable utopian socialists ==
- Catherine Isabella Barmby
- John Goodwyn Barmby
- Edward Bellamy
- Alphonse Toussenel
- Tommaso Campanella
- Etienne Cabet
  - Icarians
- Victor Considérant
- David Dale
- Charles Fourier
  - North American Phalanx
  - The Phalanx
- King Gillette
- Jean-Baptiste Godin
- Laurence Gronlund
- John Humphrey Noyes
- John Ball
- Robert Owen
- Philippe Buonarroti
- Vaso Pelagić
- Olinde Rodrigues
- Henri de Saint-Simon
- William Thompson
- Wilhelm Weitling
- Gerrard Winstanley
- Thomas Paine
- Matti Kurikka

== Notable utopian communities ==
Utopian communities have existed all over the world. In various forms and locations, they have existed continuously in the United States since the 1730s, beginning with Ephrata Cloister, a religious community in what is now Lancaster County, Pennsylvania.

Owenite communities

- New Lanark, Scotland, 1786
- New Harmony, Indiana, 1814

Fourierist communities

- Brook Farm, Massachusetts, 1841
- La Reunion (Dallas), Texas, 1855
- North American Phalanx, New Jersey, 1843
- Silkville, Kansas, 1870
- Utopia, Ohio, 1844

Icarian communities

- Corning, Iowa, 1860

Anarchist communities

- Home, Washington, 1898
- Life and Labor Commune, Moscow Oblast, Soviet Union (Russia), 1921
- Socialist Community of Modern Times, New York, 1851
- Whiteway Colony, United Kingdom, 1898

Others

- Fairhope, Alabama, US, 1894
- Kaweah Colony, California, 1886
- Llano del Rio, California, 1914
- Los Mochis, Sinaloa, Mexico, 1893
- Nevada City, Nevada, 1916
- New Australia, Paraguay, 1893
- Oneida Community, New York, 1848
- Ruskin Colony, Tennessee, 1894
- Rugby, Tennessee, 1880
- Sointula, British Columbia, 1901

== See also ==
- Pre-Marx socialists
- Pre-Marxist communism
- Christian socialism
- Communist utopia
- Diggers
- Ethical socialism
- Futurism
- History of socialism
- Ideal (ethics)
- Intentional communities
- Kibbutz
- List of American utopian communities
- List of intentional communities
- Marxism
- Nanosocialism
- Post-capitalism
- Post-scarcity
- Radicalism (historical)
- Ricardian socialism
- Scientific socialism
- Socialism
- Socialist economics
- Syndicalism
- Utopia for Realists
- Yellow socialism
- Zero waste
