= Brotherhood Church =

Christian anarchist community

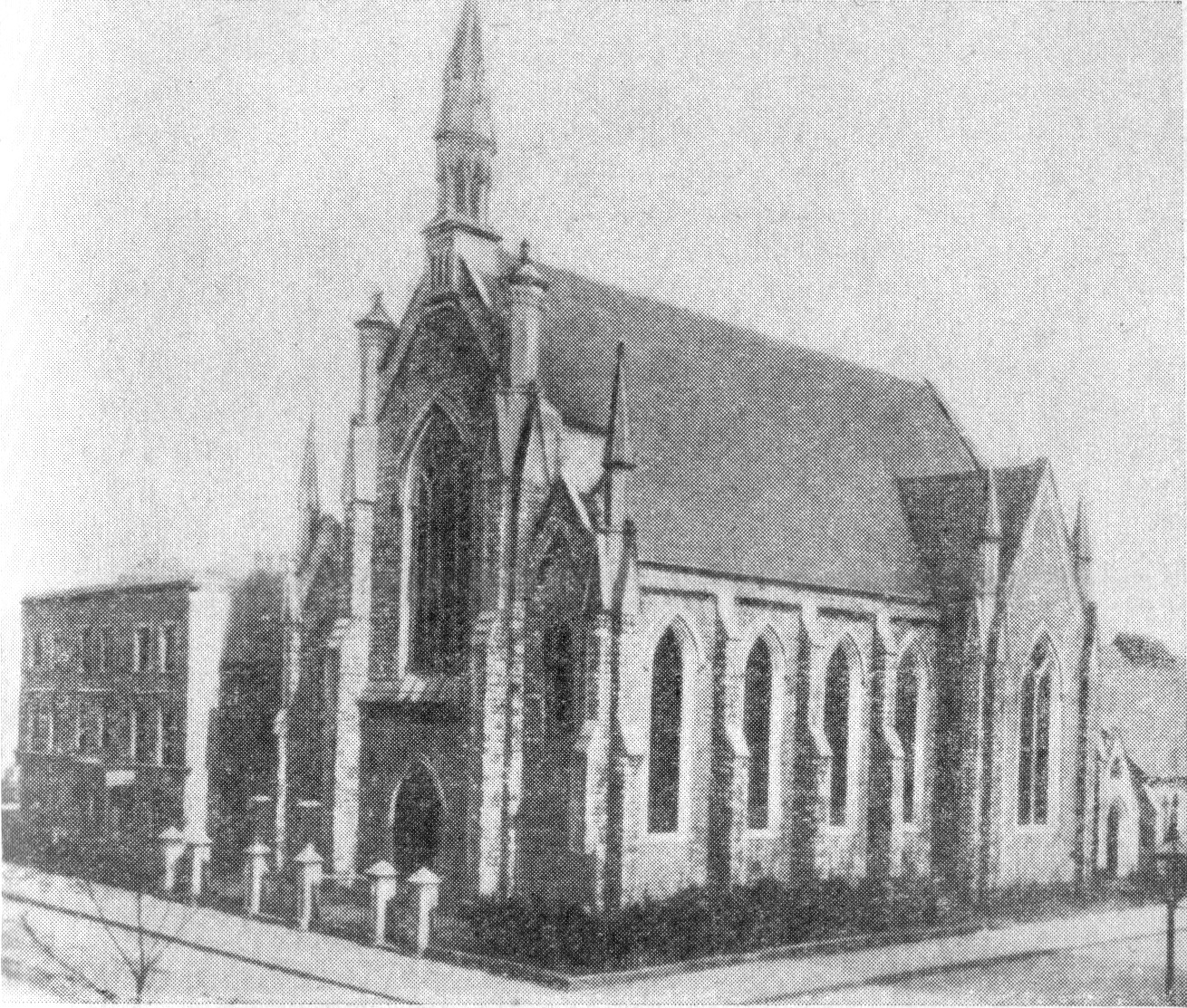
Brotherhood Church, Southgate Road, London.

The Brotherhood Church is a Christian anarchist and pacifist community. An intentional community with Quaker origins has been located at Stapleton, near Pontefract, Yorkshire, since 1921.

== History ==
The church can be traced back to 1887 when a Congregationalist minister called John Bruce Wallace started a magazine called "The Brotherhood" in Limavady, Northern Ireland. Wallace was influenced by the views of Henry George and Edward Bellamy. In 1891 Wallace moved to London and took over a derelict church in Southgate Road, Hackney, naming it "The Brotherhood Church." The Russian Social Democratic Labour Party used the building in 1907 for their 5th Congress.

Subsequent communities were established by a Tolstoyan named John Coleman Kenworthy in Croydon, Surrey, in 1894 and Purleigh, Essex, in 1896. Residents at Croydon and Purleigh included Aylmer and Louise Maude and Vladimir Chertkov. However, both these communities ceased shortly after they were established, as Kenworthy fell out with Chertkov and argued with Aylmer Maude over the English translation of Tolstoy's works. Based on a letter from Tolstoy, Kenworthy was under the impression that he had exclusive rights over some of Tolstoy's texts. Aylmer Maude, on the other hand, believed the reason for the failure of the colony was due to Kenworthy's autocratic and irresponsible behaviour.

In 1897 several members, some from a Quaker background, moved to Leeds. The receipt of a legacy enabled the group to relocate to a seven and a half acre smallholding at Stapleton in 1921. Another Purleigh splinter group established the Whiteway Colony in 1898, funded by a Quaker journalist.

John Bruce Wallace went on to become an early resident at Letchworth in Hertfordshire where he held religious gatherings each Sunday in the Howard Hall. After the establishment of the Brotherhood Church Wallace founded the Alpha Union Society which held many of its meetings at the recently built The Cloisters in Letchworth.

In 1934, the church in Hackney, London, was demolished and now a block of flats stands on the site.

== Stapleton Colony ==
The Stapleton Colony are vegetarian, grow much of their own organic food and attempt to live independently from the government. They are affiliated to the Peace Pledge Union, Campaign for Nuclear Disarmament and War Resisters' International. Residents have included Len W. Gibson (1919–2007) who was a lifelong peace campaigner and conscientious objector.

== See also ==
- Utopian socialism
- Tolstoyan movement
