= Life and Labor Commune =

The Life and Labor Commune (Russian: Жизнь и труд, romanized: Zhizn i trud) was a Tolstoyan agricultural commune founded in 1921 and disbanded as a state run collective farm on 1 January 1939. The commune was founded near Moscow but was later resettled in central Siberia, not far from Novokuznetsk. At its peak, it reportedly had as many as 1,000 participants. Throughout its existence the members of the commune were persecuted by the Bolsheviks, both for refusing to enlist or support their war efforts as well as for organizing themselves communally outside of the approved state structure.

== History ==
=== Founding in Moscow (1921–1930) ===
As the Russian Civil War drew to an end, and in the middle of the Russian famine of 1921–1922, the Life and Labor Commune was established. The Commune held 55 hectares of agricultural land in Shestakovka, roughly 10 kilometers outside of Moscow. All its members were provided with free, vegetarian, communal meals, as well as housing, lighting and heating. Each member was also given a monthly allowance of 25 rubles, which were usually spent on clothing and footwear.

=== Move to Siberia (1931–1936) ===
Life and Labor was one of several Tolstoyan agricultural communes that existed in the Moscow region during the 1920s. Following Joseph Stalin's rise to power, in 1929, the New Jerusalem Commune was forcibly dissolved and its members were taken in by the Life and Labor Commune. The government then pressed for the Life and Labor Commune to be forcibly converted into a kolkhoz, despite the Commune's members wishes to maintain their voluntary collective labor. They countered with a proposal that all Tolstoyans in Russia be granted land, where they could collectively resettle. In March 1931, the Life and Labour Commune transferred to Novokuznetsk, in Siberia.

Over a thousand Tolstoyans from various different groups joined the Commune in Siberia. The different conditions in Siberia forced them to experiment with new kinds of agriculture, establishing greenhouses and using different grains. Their efforts were successful and they began supplying food for the local market, which gave them the resources to buy an oil press, build a watermill and set up an apiary. They also established contact with Tolstoyan communities abroad, including in Bulgaria, Canada and the United Kingdom.

=== Suppression ===
From the start of their time in Siberia, the Commune faced a conflict with local Soviet authorities, which set high grain quotas and requisitioned food without authorization, conscripted the commune's pacifist members, carried out arbitrary arrests of Tolstoyans and tried its schoolteachers for teaching about religion. During the Great Purge, 65 of the Commune's leading members were arrested and tried, with many of them being sentenced to forced labor in the Gulag, where a number of them died or were killed. During World War II, 40 more of the Commune's members were conscripted to fight on the Eastern Front, while others were sentenced as conscientious objectors. With its membership facing a rapid decline, the Commune was finally converted into a kolkhoz.

Aleksandr Solzhenitsyn wrote about the persecution of the commune:

"In the twenties, a large group of Tolstoyans was exiled to the foothills of the Altai mountains, and there they established communal settlements jointly with the Baptists. When the construction of the Kuznetsk industrial complex began, they supplied it with food products. Then arrests began - first the teachers (they were not teaching in accordance with the government program), and the children ran after the police cars, shouting. And after that the commune leaders were taken."

— Aleksandr Solzhenitsyn, The Gulag Archipelago, Chapter 2, p. 51

== Memoirs of participants ==
Several of the participants in the commune wrote memoirs of their experiences.

"Out of the stormy, boundless ocean of human life, with all its infinitely varied aspirations and fates, suddenly one part of it was caught up in a powerful maelstrom, whirled together into one unit, and torn away from the rest of the mass. It was carried off on the foamy crest of the wave. Then with a mighty surge it was lifted up into the air, toward the sun, and was thrown with powerful force against a cliff. It broke into thousands of droplets, sparkling with all the colors of the rainbow, then fell back into the ocean and merged with it. And it was no more. And it seemed that there had never been anything. But there was! And the memory of it lives on in the souls of those who experienced it as something bright, great, necessary, and joyous."

— Boris Mazurin, Memoirs Of Peasant Tolstoyans In Soviet Russia, p. 108

== See also ==
- Anarchism in Russia
- Christian anarchism
- Tolstoyans
- Utopian socialism

== Bibliography ==
- Alston, Charlotte (2013). Tolstoy and his Disciples. Tauris. pp. 41–47. ISBN 9780857724786.
- MacKinnon, Elaine (2016). ""We Are Not Counterrevolutionaries!": Soviet Tolstoyans and Their Fate, 1917-1939". Tolstoy Studies Journal. 28: 44–54.
- Mazurin, Boris (1993). "The Life and Labor Commune". In Edgerton, William (ed.). Memoirs Of Peasant Tolstoyans In Soviet Russia. Indiana University Press. ISBN 9780253319111.
- Siegelbaum, Lewis (2013). "Those Elusive Scouts: Pioneering Peasants and the Russian State, 1870s–1950s". Kritika: Explorations in Russian and Eurasian History. 14 (1): 31–58. doi:10.1353/kri.2013.0007.
- Siegelbaum, Lewis H.; Page Moch, Leslie (2014). Broad Is My Native Land: Repertoires and Regimes of Migration in Russia's Twentieth Century. Cornell University Press. p. 40. ISBN 9780801455131.
