= Stapleton Colony =

Christian anarcho-pacifist intentional community

Coordinates: 53.67027°N 1.22161°W

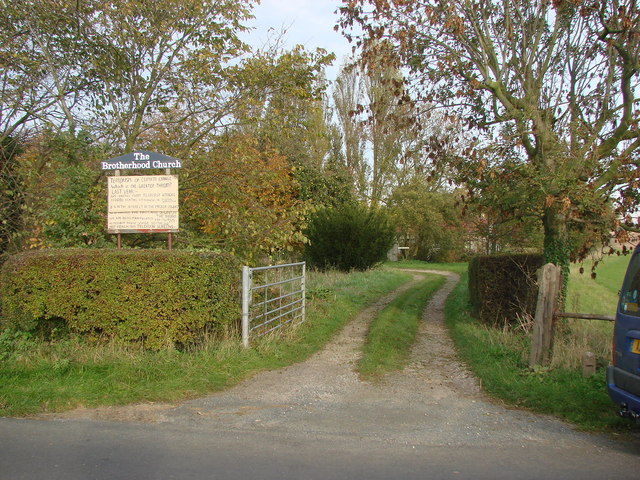
Entrance to the Brotherhood Church at Stapleton

The Stapleton Colony, based in Stapleton, North Yorkshire, is a Christian pacifist and anarchist community, and the only remaining colony of the Brotherhood Church. By 2016 the population of the colony had declined to four residents.

In 1897 several members of the Brotherhood Church, some from a Quaker background, moved to Leeds. The receipt of a legacy left to a member, Lillian Ferris, enabled the group to relocate to a seven and a half acre smallholding at Stapleton in 1921.

The Stapleton community are vegetarian, grow much of their own organic food and attempt to live independently from the government. They are affiliated to the Peace Pledge Union, Campaign for Nuclear Disarmament and War Resisters' International. Residents have included Len W. Gibson (1919–2007) who was a lifelong peace campaigner and conscientious objector.
