= Willian, Hertfordshire =

Village in Hertfordshire, England

Coordinates: 51.961°N 0.220°W

Willian
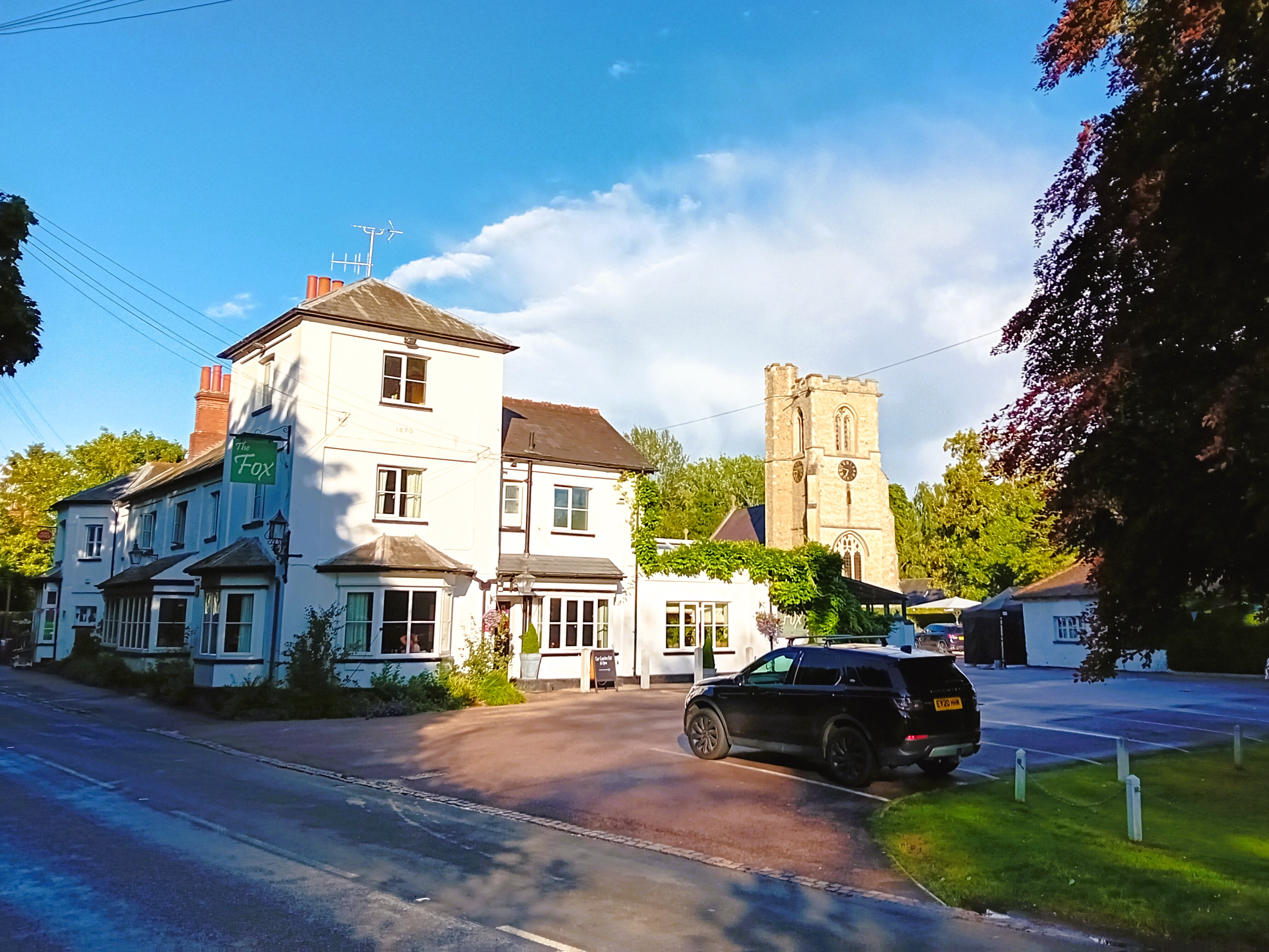
- The Fox pub and All Saints' Church

- Location within Hertfordshire
- OS grid reference: TL225308
- District: North Hertfordshire
- Shire county: Hertfordshire
- Region: East
- Country: England
- Sovereign state: United Kingdom
- Post town: LETCHWORTH GARDEN CITY
- Postcode district: SG6
- Dialling code: 01462
- Police: Hertfordshire
- Fire: Hertfordshire
- Ambulance: East of England
- UK Parliament: North East Hertfordshire

Willian is a village adjoining the southern edge of town of Letchworth, in the North Hertfordshire district of Hertfordshire, England. Along with Norton and Old Letchworth, it is one of the original three villages around which the garden city of Letchworth was created. Despite this, the village retains a separate character to the rest of Letchworth Garden City.

== History ==
The village was referred to in the Domesday Book of 1086 as "Wilie", and the name probably derives from a word meaning "willows". There is no explicit mention of a church or priest at Willian in the Domesday Book, but the current parish church of All Saints seems to have been started a few years later in the early twelfth century.

In 1903 much of the land in the parish of Willian and the neighbouring parishes of Letchworth and Norton was purchased for the development of the first garden city, which took its name from the smallest of the three old parishes, Letchworth. The area north of Willian village was gradually developed through the twentieth century as part of the newly-created town.

The solicitor and historian Reginald Hine lived in the village from 1929 until his death in 1949.

== Governance ==
Willian was an ancient parish in the hundred of Broadwater.

The parish of Willian was included in the Hitchin Poor Law Union from 1835. The eastern side of the parish of Willian extended to the edge of the town of Baldock, and in 1880 the Baldock Local Board was given control of the parts of Willian parish where the town's urban area was starting to expand into Willian. The following year the parish boundary between Willian and Baldock was adjusted to match the local board boundary.

Under the Local Government Act 1894, the parish of Willian became part of the Hitchin Rural District. Following the commencement of work on Letchworth Garden City in 1903, it became necessary to review administrative arrangements in the area. The civil parish of Letchworth was substantially enlarged in 1908 to take over all of Norton parish and the northern part of Willian parish. The reduced civil parish of Willian thereafter covered the village itself and the rural areas generally to the south of the village. The civil parish of Willian was abolished in 1935, being absorbed into the urban district of Letchworth. Since then the village has been administered as part of Letchworth, which became part of North Hertfordshire in 1974.

At the 1931 census (the last before the abolition of the parish) it had a population of 210.

== Geography ==
The village has two public houses: the Fox, built in 1870 and the Three Horseshoes, dating from the late eighteenth century. The village also has a village shop, which incorporates a Post Office, and a large pond. The parish church of All Saints has a tower with clocks on two sides; two sides are blank, supposedly so that farm labourers would not be able to tell when to leave work. This continues to be an active parish church in the village. Its daughter church of St Paul's, Letchworth became a separate parish church in 1963.
