= List of intentional communities =

This is a list of intentional communities. An intentional community is a planned residential community designed from the start to have a high degree of social cohesion and teamwork. The members of an intentional community typically hold a common social, political, religious, or spiritual vision and often follow an alternative lifestyle. They typically share responsibilities and resources. Intentional communities include collective households, co-housing communities, co-living, ecovillages, monasteries, communes, survivalist retreats, kibbutzim, ashrams, and housing cooperatives. For directories, see external links below.

== Africa ==
=== Ethiopia ===
- Awra Amba in the Amhara Region

=== South Africa ===
- Orania near Kimberley in Northern Cape

== Asia and Oceania ==
=== Australia ===
- Gondwana Sanctuary, Byron Bay, New South Wales
- House of Freedom (community), Brisbane, Queensland, founder Athol Gill
- House of the Gentle Bunyip, Melbourne, Victoria, founder Athol Gill
- House of the New World, Sydney, New South Wales, founder John Hirt
- Moora Moora, near Healesville, Victoria
- Rocky Cape Christian Community, Tasmania

=== India ===
- Auroville, Tamil Nadu

=== Israel ===
- Kibbutz Ketura
- Neve Shalom, Jerusalem

=== Japan ===
- Atarashiki-mura
- Owa Hutterite Colony

=== New Zealand ===
- Centrepoint (founded 1977)
- Gloriavale Christian Community (founded c. 1990s)
- Jerusalem/Hiruharama (1970–1972)
- Maungapohatu (founded 1907)
- Ohu communities (1974– c. 2000)
- Parihaka (founded c. 1866)
- Rātana Pā (founded c. 1920s)
- Riverside Community, New Zealand (founded 1941)

=== Syria ===
- Jinwar (founded 2016)

== Europe ==
=== France ===
- Community of the Ark, La Borie Noble
- Jansiac
- Longo Maï, Limans (1973–present)
- Taizé Community, Taizé, France

=== Denmark ===
- Det Nødvendige Seminarium (DNS)
- Freetown Christiania, Copenhagen
- Friland (2002–present)
- Svanholm
- Dyssekilde eco-community (and book town) (Torup, Denmark). Based on the thoughts of the mystic Martinus. (1987-present?)

=== Italy ===
- Federation of Damanhur, Piedmont
- Nomadelfia

=== Germany ===
- Bruderhof Communities, originally in Germany but spread to other countries since
- Kommune Niederkaufungen
- ZEGG
- Mittendrin Leben eG

=== Greece ===
- Eutopia project (community)
- Free and Real

=== Montenegro ===
- Montelibero, a libertarian community based on ideas of the Free State Project

=== Portugal ===
- Ecoaldea Vegetariana Espiral, Cabeceiras de Basto
- Tamera

=== Russia ===
- Life and Labor Commune (1921–1939)
- Seattle Commune in the Soviet Union

=== Spain ===
- Lakabe in Lacabe
- FAMILIAFELIZ in Cervera del Maestre (CS)
- Global Tribe, Andalucia
- Resonancia Community in the Alpujarra (Granada). A Coliving in combination with the Ecovillage Laboratory Valle de Sensaciones

=== Sweden ===
- Ängsbacka

=== United Kingdom ===
- Bruderhof Communities in Robertsbridge, East Sussex, England and in Peckham in southeast London.
- Braziers Park in South Oxfordshire, England
- Brithdir Mawr in Pembrokeshire, Wales
- Chemin Neuf Community and Community of Saint Anselm, Canterbury, England
- Dial House in England (1970–present)
- Findhorn in Scotland
- Frestonia in London (1970s–1982)
- New Creation Christian Community (closed)
- Tinker's Bubble in England
- Rubha Phoil in Scotland
- Stapleton Colony in England (1921–present)
- Whiteway Colony

== North America ==
=== Canada ===
==== Religious multi-province ====
- Hutterite colonies, in Alberta, BC and Saskatchewan
- Fort Pitt Farms Christian Community near Lloydminster, Saskatchewan, one of the Hutterite Christian Communities that exist in Canada and the United States, formerly in Australia as well.
- Orthodox Mennonites, horse and buggy Mennonites, with groups in Ontario and Manitoba, Canada, and in the United States but founded in Ontario

==== Ontario ====
- Black Fly
- Community Farm of the Brethren, Bright, Ontario
- Dandelion
- Dragonfly
- Herschel, Herschel Township
- Morninglory
- Whole Village, Alton, Ontario

==== British Columbia ====
- New Oasis for Life Commune, BC
- Yarrow Ecovillage, Chilliwack, British Columbia
- Poole's Land, Tofino, Vancouver Island, British Columbia
- Slocan Valley area communities
  - Many Skies
  - Strawberry Hill
  - Flying Hearts Family commune, northwest of Nelson. Founded circa 1970. Home of most members of the band Brain Damage. In the process of closing as of 2025.
  - Middle Road Community, Nelson, BC
  - Harmony Gates

==== Nova Scotia ====
- Treehouse Village Ecohousing, Bridgewater, Nova Scotia

=== United States ===
==== Midwestern United States ====
- Bishop Hill Colony, Bishop Hill, Illinois, founded by Swedish pietist Eric Jansson
- Dancing Rabbit Ecovillage, Rutledge, Missouri
- Dreamtime Village, West Lima, Wisconsin
- East Wind Community, Tecumseh, Missouri
- Elmendorf Christian Community, Mountain Lake, Minnesota
- Enright Ridge Urban Ecovillage, Cincinnati, Ohio
- The Homestead at Denison University, Granville, Ohio
- Jesus People USA (JPUSA), Chicago, Illinois
- Nottingham Housing Cooperative in Madison, Wisconsin
- People of Praise, South Bend, Indiana
- Project Neighborhood, intentional community ran by Calvin University in Grand Rapids, Michigan.
- Reba Place Fellowship is an intentional Christian community located in Evanston, Illinois within the Chicago metro area
- Stelle, Illinois, until 1982 an intentional community of the Stelle group
- Sunrise Colony, Saginaw, Michigan
- Sunward Cohousing, Ann Arbor, Michigan
- Tenacious Unicorn Ranch, Colorado
- Trumbullplex, Detroit, Michigan
- Utopia, Ohio
- Word of God (community), Ann Arbor, Michigan

==== Northeastern United States ====
- The Abode of the Message, New Lebanon, New York
- Bruderhof Communities New York
- Bryn Gweled Homesteads, Southampton, Pennsylvania
- Community of Jesus, Orleans, Massachusetts
- Mariapolis Luminosa (Focolare), Hyde Park, New York
- The Free State Project, a state where libertarians concentrate their numbers in the state of New Hampshire to influence democracy
- Ganas, Staten Island, New York
- Modern Times, Brentwood, New York
- Mohegan Colony, Mohegan Lake, New York
- Rachel Carson EcoVillage, Pittsburgh, Pennsylvania
- Sabbathday Lake Shaker Village, New Gloucester, Maine
- Helicon Home Colony, Englewood, New Jersey.(Upton Sinclair was a founder)

==== Southern United States ====
- Acorn Community, Mineral, Virginia
- Adelphi, Texas
- Alleluia Community, Augusta, Georgia
- Believers in Christ, Lobelville, Tennessee
- Caneyville Christian Community, Caneyville, Kentucky
- Celo Community, Burnsville, North Carolina, United States
- The Farm, Summertown, Tennessee
- Heathcote Community Freeland, Maryland
- Koinonia Farm, near Americus, Georgia
- Living energy farm, Louisa, Virginia
- Miccosukee Land Co-op, Tallahassee, Florida
- Noah Hoover Mennonites, existing in Belize, Canada, and the United States, but centered on Scottsville, Kentucky
- Paulville, Texas, a planned community for supporters of Ron Paul
- Serenbe, Chattahoochee Hills, Georgia
- Twelve Tribes communities, existing worldwide but founded in Chattanooga, Tennessee
- Twin Oaks Community, Louisa, Virginia
- Vernon Community, Hestand, Kentucky
- The Werehouse, Winston-Salem, North Carolina

==== Western United States ====
- Alpha Farm, Deadwood, Oregon
- Avalon Organic Gardens & EcoVillage, founded by the Global Community Communications Alliance, Tumacacori, Arizona
- Black Bear Ranch, an 80-acre intentional community located in Siskiyou County, California
- Capitol Hill Autonomous Zone (2020)
- Drop City, Colorado
- Equality Colony, Washington
- Halcyon, California
- Home, Washington
- Kaliflower Commune, San Francisco, California
- Lafayette Morehouse, Lafayette, California
- Slab City, California (c. 1961–present)
- Stone Curves, Tucson, Arizona
- The Seasteading Institute, an attempt to create artificial land in the ocean for libertarian migration. It is trying to build its first seastead in the San Francisco Bay, California.

== Latin America ==
=== Brazil ===
- Cecília Colony

=== Colombia ===
- Gaviotas

=== Mexico ===
- Topolobampo, 1886–1896. Led by Albert Kimsey Owen.

== See also ==
- Cohousing
- Communities Directory
- Cooperatives
- Ecovillage
- Egalitarian Communities
- Intentional community
- List of American utopian communities
- New Age communities
- Utopia
- Utopian socialism
