= Chemin Neuf Community =

Catholic community

- Orientation: Catholic with ecumenical vocation
- Polity: Hierarchical
- Leader: Fr. François Michon, I.C.N.
- Region: 30 countries
- Members: 2000
- Primary schools: 2 (Kinshasa & Moundou)
- Secondary schools: 1 (Gagnoa)
- Official website: www.chemin-neuf.org.uk

The Chemin Neuf Community (French: Communauté du Chemin Neuf) is a Catholic community with an ecumenical vocation. Formed from a charismatic prayer group in 1973, it has 2,000 permanent members in 30 countries, and 12,000 people serving in the community missions. Its main founder is the Jesuit father, Laurent Fabre.

The community takes its name from the first meeting place, based in Lyon, 49 Montée du Chemin-Neuf. A product of the Charismatic Renewal, the community adheres to Ignatian spirituality. It brings together priests, lay celibates (men and women) as well as non-celibates and couples with or without children. The community directs its actions around the principle of unity: unity of Christians (ecumenism), unity of peoples, and unity of couples and of families.

== History ==
=== Context ===
Pentecostalism, a new branch of Christianity focusing on the welcoming of the Holy Spirit, evolved in the US after 1900 (In Topeka and then in Azusa Street Revival, Los Angeles). Its manifestations (speaking in tongues, prophecy, healings, etc.) rapidly provoked rejection from other churches (Protestant or Catholic). In 1967, some Catholic students from Duquesne University in Pittsburgh, during the course of a bible study week-end, received the Baptism in the holy spirit. After this experience, prayer groups and communities began to expand in the Catholic church in the US and throughout the rest of the world.

=== Beginnings ===
In 1971, the Jesuit seminarian Laurent Fabre met Mike Cawdrey, an American Jesuit student who was familiar with the American Charismatic Renewal, at the diocesan seminary in Lyon. He convinced him, together with Bertrand Lepesant (who was later to become the founder of the Communauté du Puits de Jacob) to spend two days in prayer asking for the presence of the Holy Spirit in Le Touvet. Two young American Protestants, just back from Taizé and about to leave for a pilgrimage to Jerusalem, were also invited. At the end of this weekend, the two French men received the "Baptism in the Holy Spirit". After this experience, they founded a charismatic prayer group located in Montée du Chemin-Neuf.

In 1973, Laurent Fabre, accompanied by Bertrand Lepesant, left for the United States to meet with American Charismatics. On their return, they organized a week-end attended by sixty people; seven of them celibates, four men and three women between 22 and 32 years of age, from amongst whom Laurent Fabre decided to form a lifelong community. In the beginning, they favoured a name taken from the Bible, but the members of the new foundation quickly realised that in the eyes of their visitors, due to their geographical location they were known as the "Chemin Neuf". Couples quickly joined this community which added to the mix couples and celibates. Apart from Laurent Fabre, this first community also included Jacqueline Coutellier, who had been thinking about joining the Carmelites but who has since been committed to the life of the Chemin Neuf.

By September 1978, the Chemin Neuf had 30 adult members, living in private homes or in the three community houses at that time (two in Lyon and one in Beaujolais): about twenty children lived in the community without being part of it.

=== Development of the community ===
In 1980, a cycle of theological training, biblical and community based (lasting for three months) was established in Les Pothieres, a house of the community near Anse. It continued here another thirty years and, due to its success, spread to three locations (one in France, one in Spain and one in the Ivory Coast). Also in 1980 the first course for couples (Cana session) was launched which, in 2016, is the most popular Chemin Neuf course.

At the beginning of the 1980s, the community was invited to come to the Paris area, to the Cenacle de Tigery, a few miles south of Paris, and to the student house based in the rue Madame in the 6th Arrondissement in Paris. The community also began to grow on an international level, welcoming its first non-French members (Polish, German and Madagascan) and setting up a base in Brazzaville in the Congo. In 1982, the Chemin Neuf had about forty adult members.

Cardinal Albert Decourtray, archbishop of Lyon, was particularly enthusiastic to have the community in his diocese, "the number of conversions impresses me". By that time, the Chemin Neuf had about 250 members of which 20 were life-long members; furthermore, five priests and two deacons had already been ordained and six seminarists were undergoing training. On Easter Sunday of 1986 in the Cathedral of Saint-Jean, together with Jean-Marc Villet, pastor of the French Reform Church, Mgr Decourtray received 19 lifelong members of the community, amongst them five couples and three Protestant members

The archbishop assigned some missions to the Chemin Neuf, especially those relating to communication. In 1982 Emmanuel Payen, priest at La Duchère, set up Radio-Fourviere with him, which soon became known as RCF. Another member of the Chemin Neuf, Vincent de Crouy-Chanel, later became director of it. Dominique Ferry, for his part, was press attache to the cardinal from 1989 to 1992. This influence of the Chemin Neuf on diocesan life was sometimes criticised but the archbishop responded that Charismatics were only available for certain missions, notably the hospital chaplaincy of Pierre Garraud. to which ten people were devoted.

In 1992, the apostolic section of the Communion of the Chemin Neuf was created which brought together people wishing to live the spirituality of the community without being involved in all its commitments.

From 1993 -1996 the community went through a crisis leading to the departure of certain members. This crisis coincided with the publication of the books The shipwrecks of the Spirit (Les naufragés de l'esprit), which were very critical towards a number of charismatic communities. A former supporter. of the Chemin Neuf complained about sect-like practices such as brain washing and proselytism. After the publication, it was however revealed that Thierry Baffoy, one of its authors, had made certain inaccuracies and anachronisms regarding the Chemin Neuf. Furthermore, several bishops disputed the assertions contained in the work; Mgr Balland, then Archbishop of Lyon, stated, "Wherever (the Community) is established it accepts the advice and guidance of the bishops and puts itself at the service of all without distinction or proselytism".

In 1998, a very controversial article published by the Centre Against Mental Manipulation (Centre contre les manipulations mentales) mentioned, amongst other new communities, the Chemin Neuf, before however mentioning in the footnotes that "certain religious practices even non sectarian in themselves... are essential to the understanding of sectarian excesses which originate from the same".

The legitimacy of these critics is, however, in question, notably by MIVILUDES which has not even mentioned the Chemin Neuf in its various annual reports since 2001. Henri Tincq believes that these criticizes are hardly appropriate concerning "The Chemin Neuf, reputed to be the wisest community, recognized by the State with the status of congregation and by the Church…". Since 1989, the sociologist Martine Cohen stated, with regard to the Chemin Neuf, "We are not only far from a strictly charismatic legitimisation of power but the distrust towards a unique 'inspiration from the Holy Spirit' has created, far beyond a usual recourse to tradition or to authorities already in place, a sort of control by the grass roots".

=== The structuring and launching of new missions ===
After 1995, the community became too numerous for decisions to continue to be taken by universal suffrage. The decision was taken to organise a chapter every seven years (1995, 2002, 2009, 2016) to which the seventy two members were elected by the entire community.

An international choir was established in 1996 to prepare for the World Youth Days in Paris in August 1997: it notably gave concerts in 2000 on the Piazza di Spagna and on the Pope's podium at the final gathering of the World Youth Days in Rome (on the future site of the University of Rome Tor Vergata) as well as from 2001 to 2003 in Chartres Cathedral, France.

In 2000, for the occasion of the World Youth Days, Net For God was established, a network of prayer and training for the unity of Christians and peace in the world, which brought together all the supporters of the Chemin Neuf and drew its inspiration from the vision of "the invisible monastery" developed in 1944 by Paul Couturier. A teaching video was transmitted every month by this network, which was growing rapidly: in 2011, the video was sent to more than one thousand "Net points", spread over 80 countries across the world and translated into twenty-six languages. In 2002, at the time of the second community assembly (known as the chapter), it was decided that all the commitments in the community or in all the different community missions would happen "within the ecumenical and international Net for God".

That same year, Father Jerome Dupre La Tour, priest in the diocese of Lyon, presented to members of the council of priests, a report on the Canonical Status of the Emmanuel and Chemin Neuf communities. Its sentiments were criticised, in spite of the fact that the Status of the Chemin Neuf (public association of the faithful, which authorised a greater involvement from the bishop of the area); in his opinion, the name used by the civil authorities (congregation) did not cover the canonic definition of this term which gave way to a vagueness, notably in relation to the authority. As the canon priest, Michel Dortel-Claudot reminded us, these criticisms were found in all new communities: "the canon law of 1983, in its actual form, has not been adapted to new communities. To offer them the title 'Association of the faithful' is an ill-fitting coat", this framework had not been thought of for a group whose work took over the whole life of a person.

In 2005, on the occasion of the World Youth Days in Cologne, a fraternity of young people was created with a strong link to the community: this fraternity took on the name of Youth of the Chemin Neuf. This structure made itself know in 2010, notably through the making of funny or parody style videos relating to the Christian faith or particular events. So, in 2012, a parody of "Gangnam Style" was transmitted on YouTube and received more than a million hits: "Catho Style". In 2016, a video made by the Youth of the Chemin Neuf pretended to be a response to the song "Sorry" by Justin Bieber.

This media coverage was a way of responding to the criticisms of poor communication within the Catholic Church, choosing "to leave its walls ..., to reach young people, ... using media". Using social networks has given the Chemin Neuf a continual presence in the media since the 1980s. In 2014, the Chemin Neuf created a "Political Fraternity", bringing together young Christians (18 to 35 years) who were looking to get involved in politics, without party bias or sensitivity. In 2016, this fraternity numbered about fifty young adults in ten countries.

During the years after 2000, the requests of the bishops or communities led the Chemin Neuf Community to establish itself, on average, in one new country each year. In 2016, members in missions in France numbered no more than about 40% of all members: the countries where the growth in members has been highest is Central Europe, Brazil and Africa.

== Missions ==
=== All year round missions entrusted by local churches ===
A particular request of the bishops was for the Chemin Neuf to lead parishes. The first to do this was Mgr Etchegaray, at that time Archbishop of Marseille, who entrusted the parish of Saint-Roch de Mazargues to the community from 1978 onwards. In 2017, there are 18 catholic parishes which have been entrusted in this way to Chemin Neuf teams. Besides the "classic" services within the parish, the community was also the first place in France to try out the Alpha course.

Several student halls of residence were entrusted to the Chemin Neuf by parishes, dioceses, ecclesiastical organisations, or they were established by the community (particularly in Africa in the case of the latter).

Bishops from several symbolic places of the Christian faith also asked the community, without entrusting them with the responsibility of the buildings, to sing the daily liturgical offices, especially vespers, like in the Cathedrale Notre-Dame de Chartres, in the cathedral of Saint-Jean of Lyon or in the Basilica of Ecce Homo in Jerusalem.

=== The exercises of Saint Ignatius ===
The Chemin Neuf Community, being of Ignatian tradition, offers sessions that are in the majority inspired by the spiritual exercises, as they are given by Jesuits, adapted by integrating aspects belonging to the spirituality of the Charismatic Renewal. Every year, in France alone, the community organises about thirty retreats in the spiritual exercises lasting one week, as well as two retreats of one month, the latter is advised to be undertaken before any decision of definitive commitment. Often diocesan seminarists come to follow the latter together before their ordination as deacons.

=== Retreat activities and sessions adapted to particular situations ===
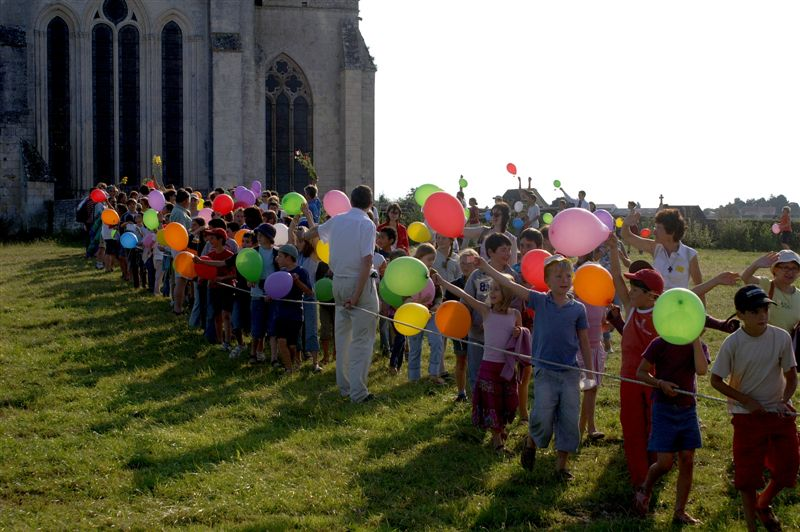
Children during a Cana session at Sablonceaux Abbey.

==== Cana Sessions ====
A first experience of sessions organised for couples took place in 1979 at the request of a couple from the Teams of Our Lady. Acknowledging very high demand, the Chemin Neuf Community launched its Cana mission in 1980 (the name of which is inspired from the place of the first of Jesus’ miracles during the marriage feast at Cana). It is a mission that involves couples and families (including children and with specific leisure time and community life organised for the latter). Even more than the other Chemin Neuf missions, this one comes under the banner of unity and reconciliation. From 1980 to 2007, nearly 20,000 couples participated in Cana sessions. For Paul Destable, assistant secretary general at the Bishops' Conference of France, the Cana mission is an example which shows "the dynamism of the lay communities".

Recognising the numerous needs relating to conjugal matters, the Cana mission expanded. As well as the initial sessions aimed at couples, other sessions were added: "Cana Couples and families" with a notable emphasis on the evangelisation of children and their participation in family life; "Cana Engagement" for couples beginning their journey, preparation for marriage, engagement: "Cana Hope" for people who are divorced or separated and not involved in a new relationship; finally "Cana Samaria" for divorced and remarried people. These last sessions are often centred on the official position of the church (particularly the Catholic church) with regard to the sacraments, and bishops are often in attendance.

The Cana mission also has at its disposal the tool "Elle et Lui" developed during the Alpha course, specifically for couples. It is offered in parishes as well as in other suitable places

In the geographic region of the two islands of Réunion and Mauritius, Valerie Perretant-Aubourg notes that the Cana Sessions are a particularly important social melting pot, bringing together doctors or teachers or illiterate building workers.

==== Mission with young people ====
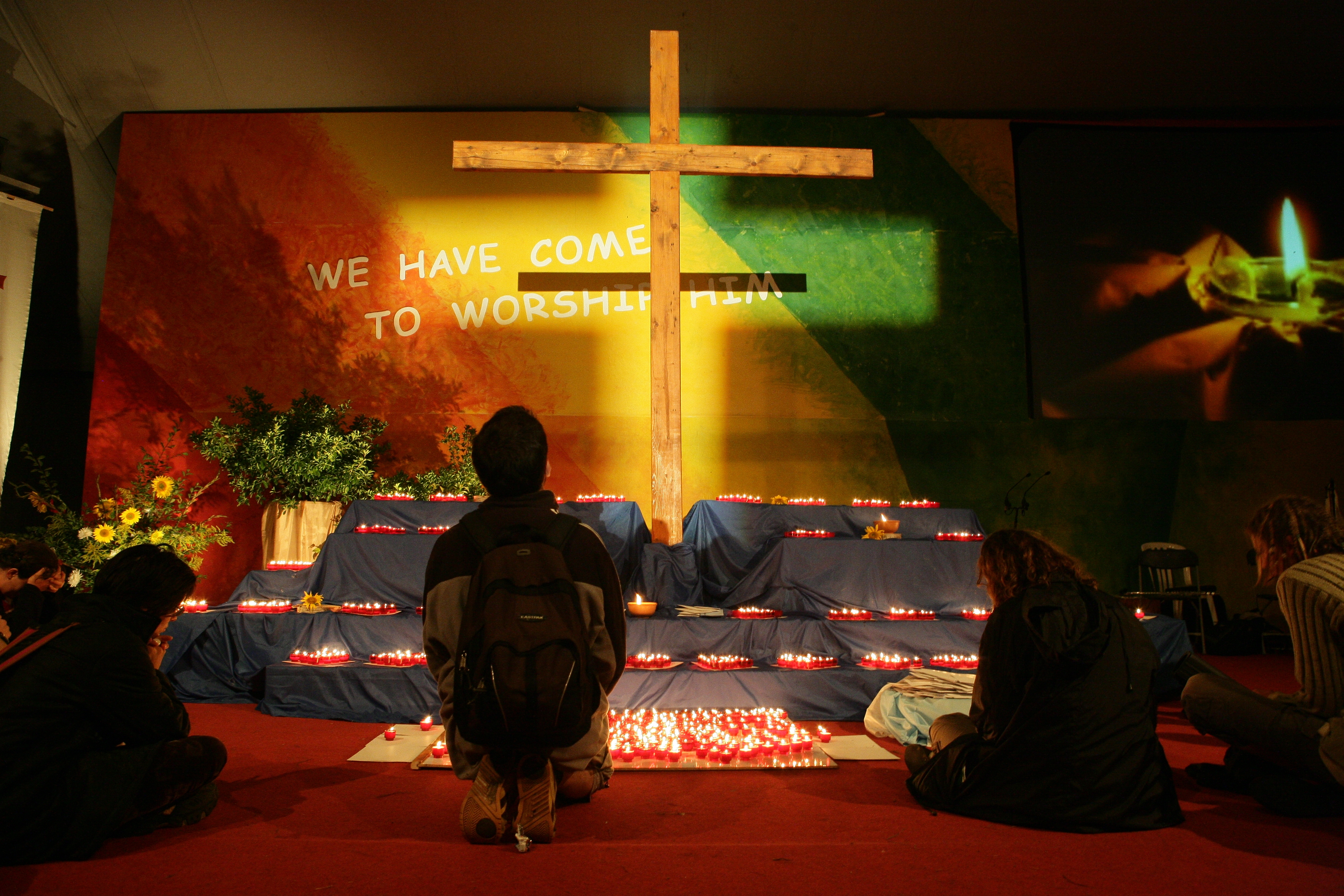
Vigil of prayer and reconciliation during the gathering at Volkenroda in 2005, organised by the Chemin Neuf on the occasion of the World Youth Day in Cologne.

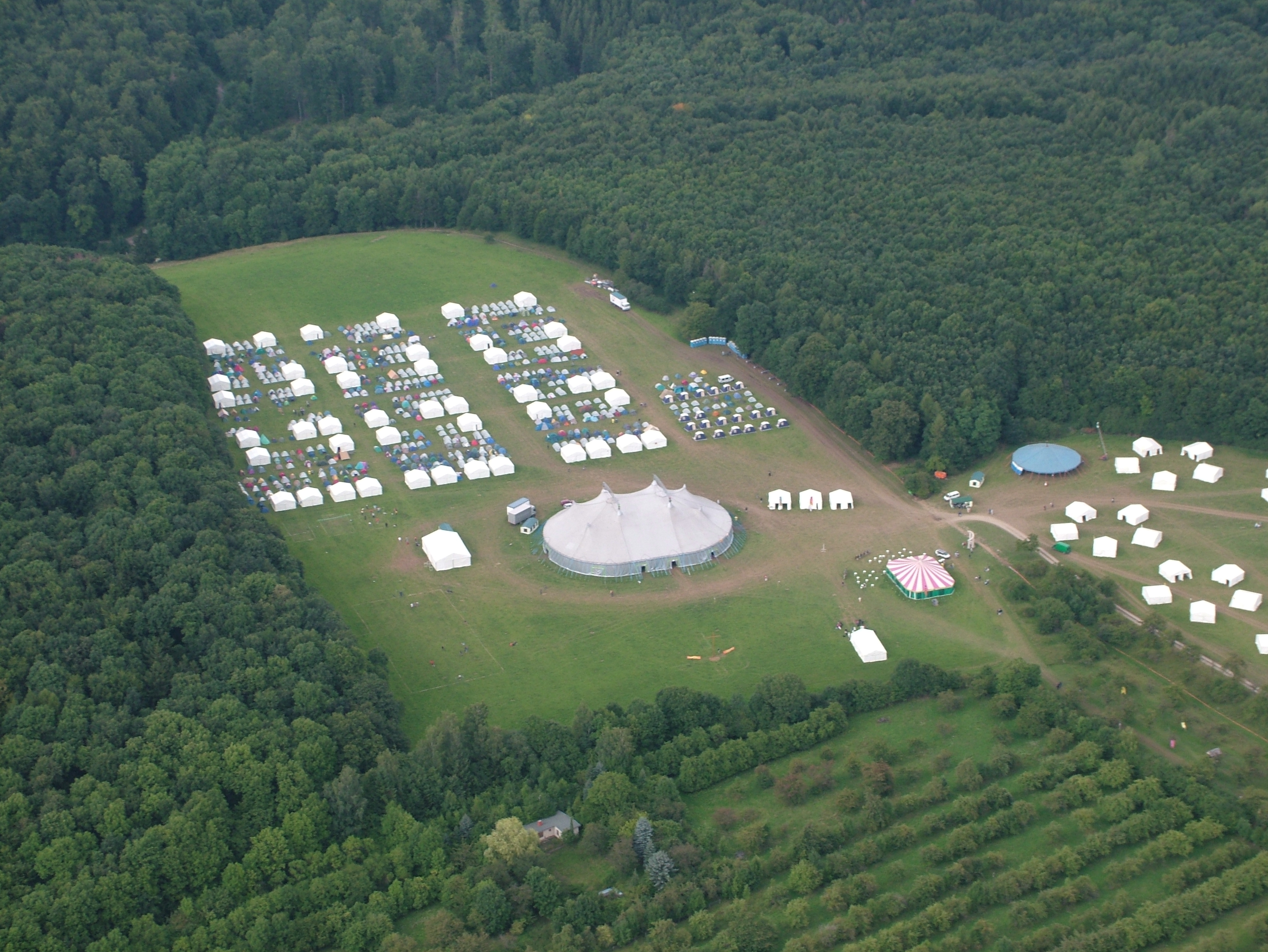
Overview of the gathering at Volkenroda in 2005.

At the beginning of the 1980s an active mission for young people aged between 18 and 30 was set up and was reinforced in 1985 with the launching of World Youth Days by Pope John Paul II. This mission has grown steadily, notably with the launch of student halls of residence in major French towns and elsewhere.

From 1986, a festival, gathering several hundred young people was organised at Sablonceaux Abbey (south west France). Participating in this were certain artists embarking on a "Creation Fraternity", performing live shows to the participants but also to local inhabitants and to tourists.

Having arrived at Hautecombe Abbey (Savoie, France), the Chemin Neuf saw the potential of this site to organise more ambitious gatherings. The first European gathering, in 1993, saw the enrolment of a thousand participants, a number which increased to two thousand in 1996 (from thirty nationalities with a predominance of Eastern Europeans). During these gatherings the day is split into two parts, with a morning dedicated to teachings and testimonies and an afternoon open for workshops and forums. A particularly strong emphasis is placed on unity and reconciliation. These gatherings in Savoie were moved to other places for specific events. This was particularly the case in the World Youth Day years. The young people, generally in large numbers (about five thousand) were also accommodated in Perugia (Umbria, Italy) in 2000, in Volkenroda, Thüringen, Germany, in 2005, in Guadarrama (Madrid, Spain) in 2011, in Łódź (Poland) in 2016 . On other occasions (Jubilee of the Ignatian Family in Lourdes in 2006) these gatherings can be moved to a specific place. Since the summer of 2012, the summer gathering at Hautecombe changed its name to: Welcome to Paradise.

The mission for teenagers aged 14 to 18 years was also launched in the 1980s. In its infancy, it was centred on evangelisation only. Since then it has opened out to humanitarianism (participation in summer missions from six to eight weeks generally in Africa). It is present in France and in the majority of the places where there are community missions.

The mission for 8 to 13 year olds is much more recent (it began between 2007 and 2010). It was developed in Brazil by the Catholic Church, worried by the defection of many of the faithful. For the moment it is limited to a few weekends per year in France and Brazil, particularly in parishes wanting to make the catechism groups more dynamic.

== Status ==
The community is composed of lay and religious persons from many Christian denominations: Catholic, Anglican, Reformed, Eastern Orthodox. In 1984, it was recognised by Cardinal Alexandre Renard and declared a public association of the faithful by Cardinal Albert Decourtray, Archbishop of Lyon. This canonical status allowed it to teach Christian doctrine on behalf of the Catholic Church and to promote public worship. From a civil point of view, the community was recognised as a religious congregation by a decree from the Prime Minister of France on 23 July 1993.

In France, the community has several branches located in Lyon, Anse (Rhône department), Soleymieu (Isère), Hautecombe (Savoie), Le Plantay (Abbey Notre-Dame-des-Dombes, Ain), Sablonceaux (Charente-Maritime), Tigery (Essonne), Chartres (Eure-et-Loir), Bouvines (Nord), Marseille (Bouches-du-Rhône), Levallois (Hauts-de-Seine), Paris, Villeurbanne (Rhône), Lucé-Mainvilliers (Eure-et-Loir), Lille (Nord), Reims (Marne), Sophia-Antipolis (Alpes-Maritimes), Angers (Maine-et-Loire). The community is also present in Belgium, Brazil, Burkina Faso, Burundi, Canada, Chad, Congo, Côte d'Ivoire, the Czech Republic, Egypt, Germany, Hungary, Israel, Italy, Lebanon, Madagascar, Martinique, Mauritius, the Netherlands, Poland, Réunion, Switzerland, and the United Kingdom.

In 2014, the Archbishop of Canterbury, Justin Welby, invited young adults from around the world to join the Community of Saint Anselm, a Jesus-centered community of prayer facilitated by the Chemin Neuf for one year. Ruth Gledhill of Christian Today wrote that "The year-long programme will include prayer, study, practical service and community life. Members will live a spiritual discipline compared to that of medieval monks, drawing closer to God through a daily rhythm of silence, study and prayer. At the same time they will also be immersed in the modern challenges of the global 21st century church, witnessing to the power of a pared-back disciplined faith in managing the demanding business of contemporary high-tech life."

== See also ==
- Intentional community
- Church of St. Apollinaire, Prague
