= Laurent Fabre (disambiguation) =

Laurent Fabre (born 1968) is a French ski mountaineer.

Laurent Fabre may also refer to:

- Laurent Fabre (priest), a French priest, founder of the Chemin Neuf Community
- Konk (cartoonist), pseudonym of French cartoonist and holocaust denier Laurent Fabre
