= Sablonceaux Abbey =

Abbey in Charente-Maritime, France

Coordinates: 45.717252°N 0.878147°W

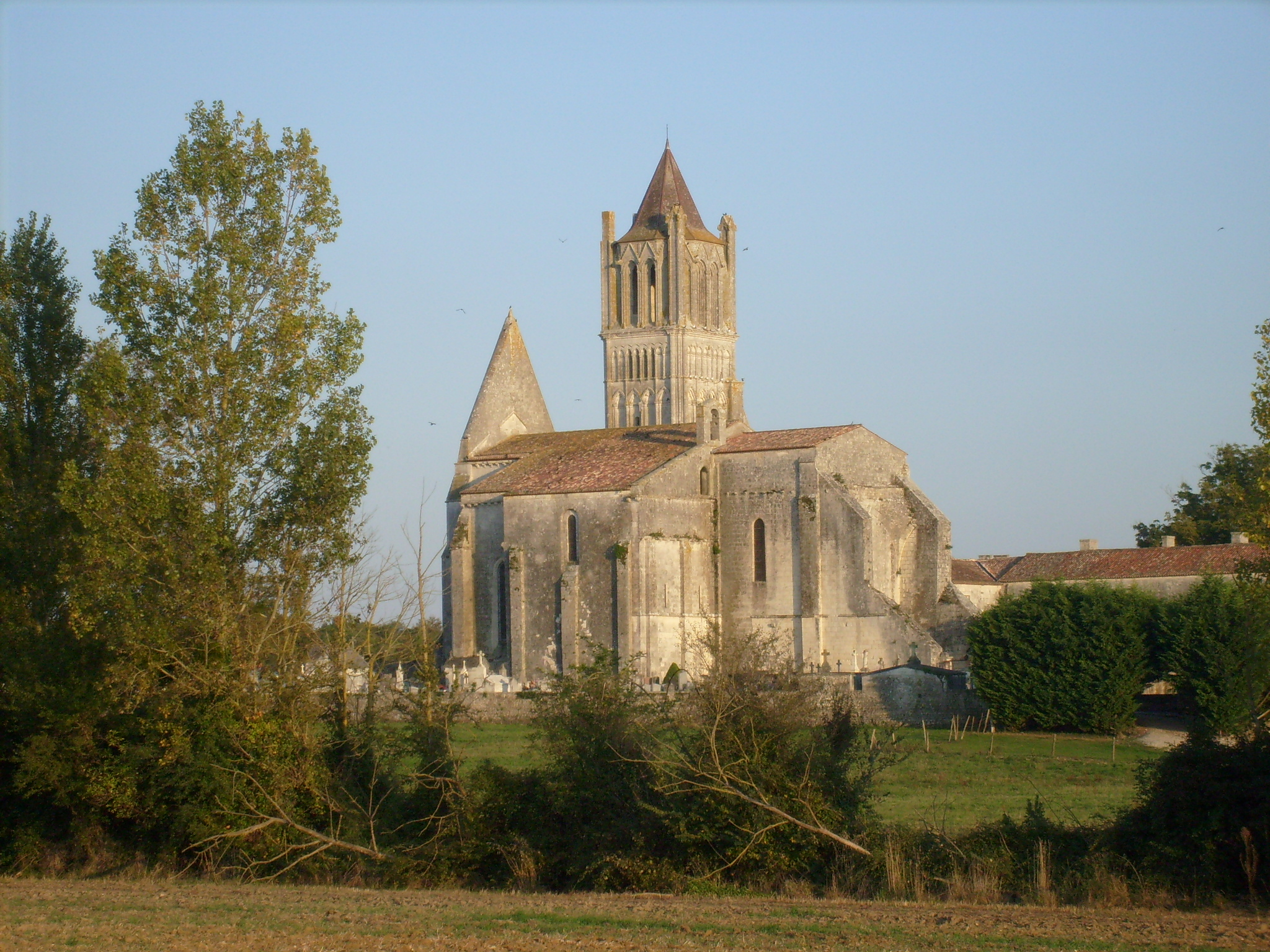
General view of the abbey

Sablonceaux Abbey (French: Abbaye de Sablonceaux) is a former Augustinian monastery located in Sablonceaux in the Charente-Maritime department of south-western France. It is now occupied by members of the Chemin Neuf Community.

== History ==
=== Creation ===
The abbey was established in 1136 by William X, Duke of Aquitaine, who initially supported antipope Anacletus II against Pope Innocent II during the papal schism of 1130, but changed his mind after the intervention of Saint Bernard of Clairvaux, and tried to demonstrate his good faith by offering to the Church two valuable monastic foundations, Fontenay-le-Comte Abbey in Vendée, and Sablonceaux Abbey.

Construction began before 1160, and the abbey was already powerful by the late 12th century, strengthened by the constant support of the archbishop of Bordeaux.

The original church was Romanesque and containing a nave with three cupolas.

=== Late Middle Ages and Renaissance ===
During the Hundred Years' War, the abbey was threatened with destruction. The bell tower was damaged, and rebuilt in the Gothic style, as it is still to be seen today.

During the French Wars of Religion, there were further battles around the abbey, which supported the Catholic side. From this time onwards the moral standards of the community began to decline, and the behaviour of the monks eventually became scandalous.

In 1633, the abbey came under the control of Chancelade Abbey. Commendatory abbots took over at this time, the first of whom, Henri d'Escoubleau de Sourdis, archbishop of Bordeaux, went to great lengths to reverse the moral and spiritual decline of the community.

=== Dissolution ===
During the French Revolution, the abbey was sold off as a "national asset" (bien national) and the limestone buildings were quarried. Two of the church's cupolas were destroyed.

In the 19th century, the abbey again became a place of prayer, but the bishop of La Rochelle closed it down because of the dangerous state of the buildings. It was afterwards sold repeatedly, and fell increasingly into ruin.

In 1907, the Ministry of Culture tried to protect the church at least by giving it the status of monument historique. The decay of the other buildings continued, however. They became an orphanage during World War II and finally a dairy.

== Restoration ==
In 1962 André Malraux, Minister of Culture, ordered the restoration of the sanctuary, which took twenty years.

In 1986, the diocese of La Rochelle decided to buy the abbey, in order to make of it a spiritual centre, a house of spiritual retreat (and hospitality to tourists), and also an artistic establishment. It gave this triple mission to the Chemin Neuf Community.
