= Rogers Township, Illinois =

Township in Illinois, US

Rogers Township
- Township
- Location in Ford County

- Ford County's location in Illinois
- Coordinates: 40°58′19″N 88°10′45″W
- Country: United States
- State: Illinois
- County: Ford
- Established: September 1863

Area
  - Total: 24.27 sq mi (62.9 km^{2})
  - Land: 24.26 sq mi (62.8 km^{2})
  - Water: 0.01 sq mi (0.026 km^{2}) 0.04%
- Elevation: 725 ft (221 m)

Population (2020)
  - Total: 381
  - Density: 15.7/sq mi (6.06/km^{2})
- Time zone: UTC-6 (CST)
  - Summer (DST): UTC-5 (CDT)
- ZIP codes: 60917, 60919, 60941, 60946
- FIPS code: 17-053-65273

Rogers Township is one of twelve townships in Ford County, Illinois, USA. As of the 2020 census, its population was 381 and it contained 197 housing units. It was formed as Grant Township from a portion of Stockton (Brenton) Township in September, 1863; its name was changed to Rogers Township on May 9, 1864.

== Geography ==
According to the 2021 census gazetteer files, Rogers Township has a total area of 24.27 square miles (62.86 km^{2}), of which 24.26 square miles (62.83 km^{2}) (or 99.96%) is land and 0.01 square miles (0.03 km^{2}) (or 0.04%) is water.

=== Cities, towns, villages ===
- Cabery (south half)
- Kempton (north quarter)

=== Unincorporated towns ===
- Stelle

=== Cemeteries ===
The township contains Saint Joseph Cemetery.

=== Major highways ===
- Illinois Route 115

== Demographics ==
As of the 2020 census there were 381 people, 183 households, and 111 families residing in the township. The population density was 15.70 inhabitants per square mile (6.06/km^{2}). There were 197 housing units at an average density of 8.12 per square mile (3.14/km^{2}). The racial makeup of the township was 95.54% White, 0.00% African American, 0.26% Native American, 0.00% Asian, 0.00% Pacific Islander, 2.36% from other races, and 1.84% from two or more races. Hispanic or Latino of any race were 3.15% of the population.

There were 183 households, out of which 13.10% had children under the age of 18 living with them, 42.62% were married couples living together, 13.11% had a female householder with no spouse present, and 39.34% were non-families. 29.00% of all households were made up of individuals, and 15.30% had someone living alone who was 65 years of age or older. The average household size was 2.03 and the average family size was 2.41.

The township's age distribution consisted of 14.0% under the age of 18, 5.9% from 18 to 24, 29.4% from 25 to 44, 28.5% from 45 to 64, and 22.1% who were 65 years of age or older. The median age was 46.2 years. For every 100 females, there were 97.3 males. For every 100 females age 18 and over, there were 96.9 males.

The median income for a household in the township was $70,208, and the median income for a family was $68,750. Males had a median income of $48,523 versus $26,563 for females. The per capita income for the township was $35,433. About 5.4% of families and 5.9% of the population were below the poverty line, including 21.2% of those under age 18 and 0.0% of those age 65 or over.

Historical population
Census	Pop.	Note	%±
2000	354		—
2010	449		26.8%
2020	381		−15.1%
U.S. Decennial Census

== School districts ==
- Tri Point Community Unit School District 6-J

== Political districts ==
- Illinois' 15th congressional district
- State House District 105
- State Senate District 53
