= Church of St. Apollinaire, Prague =

Church building in New Town, Prague, Czech Republic

Coordinates: 50.0708°N 14.4236°E

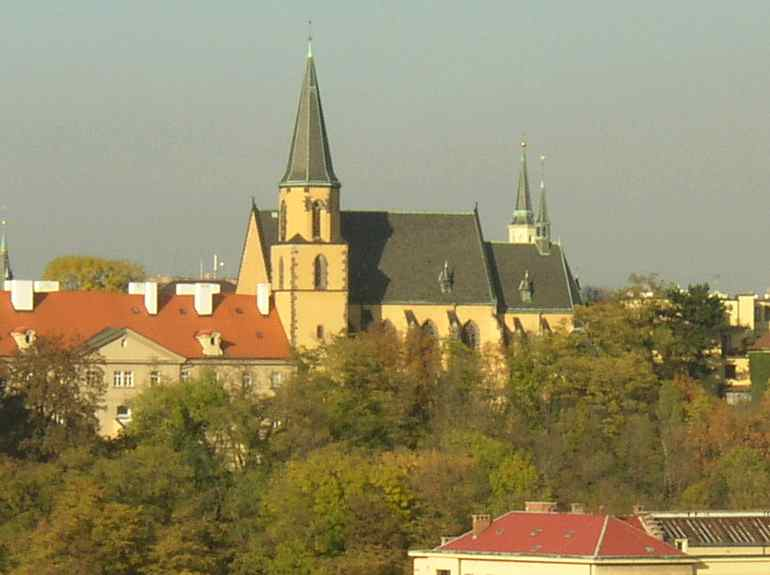
Church of St Apollinaire

The Church of St Apollinaire (Czech: Kostel svatého Apolináře) is located in New Town in Prague in the street Apolinarska on the hill called Vetrov. This Gothic church was built approximately between years 1360–1390. The church was established by Charles IV in 1362. Nowadays Roman Catholic Church is located here but it was administrated also by the Chemin Neuf community. The church is protected as a cultural heritage since 1958.

== History ==
The hill Vetrov was connected to Charles IV New Town of Prague in 1348. Charles IV arranged the transfer of a canonical college there in 1362.

The canonical college was transferred from Sadska to Prague hill of St Apollinaire after the agreement between Charles IV and Prague archbishop Arnost of Pardubice in 1362. This event initiated the construction of the church. It is possible that there used to be a chapel of St Giles, but if it was true, it was completely removed, and the church of St Apollinaire does not refer to it.

=== Construction of the church ===
There were two periods of the construction of the church. The longitudinal hall nave with five bays was built during the first period, approximately between 1360 and 1376. A small tower was located on the saddleback roof and thus the nave could temporarily work as an individual church, although it did not yet possess a presbytery. The construction of a tower on the southern part of the church was initiated after several years. The presbytery was finished during the second period, approximately in the second quarter of the 14th century. The whole church was finished in 1390.

=== History ===
The original chapter of St Apollinaire consisted of a provost and eight canons. The chapter house was connected to the church by its entry straight to the platform on the east side of the church. Around 1419 the chapter left the church, except for one canon, Peter of Kromeriz, who joined the Hussites. It could be one of the reasons why the church stayed undamaged during the Hussite movement. There was a church school between years 1414–1418.

One of the Hussite military groups from eastern Bohemia, the so-called Orebits, who occupied Vysehrad, used the monastery as their base in 1420. After that the church was used by Utraquists.

The members of the chapter of St Vitus did not use the church and church services stagnated, so in 1498 the king Vladislaus II of Hungary ruled that the chapter of St Apollinaire had to sustain paid replacements for churchmen. Those replacements had to administer parishes. The king confirmed the connection of the chapters of St Vitus and St Apollinaire in 1503.

Rudolf II devolved the church and its property to New Town for 1000 Meissen kops and for the promise of upkeep of the building and church services in 1599. New Town used and maintained premises up to 1628. During that time, it assured the restoration of the presbytery, and a new bell was made. After that the emperor Ferdinand II ruled to return the church to the St Vitus Catholic chapter in 1628. The church was damaged by a strong gale which destroyed the glazing of the windows and knocked down the tower, damaging the roof frames, in the late 1670. The church was reconstructed during next year by dean Jan Frantisek from Talmberk, but in the baroque style.

New baroque style tower with cupola and new baroque interior was most probably created by Daniel Rynd. The former dean of the church established a new altar of Staroboleslav's Mother of God in nave in 1671. In 1689 the interior of the church was damaged by the Protestants and in 1747 the west window and the portal below were walled up on the occasion of building a new adjacent house. In 1757 the church was occupied by the Prussian army which had established a temporary weapon workroom there. During the struggle for the church plastering and masonry were damaged. Restoration of especially interiors followed.

=== Restoration ===
==== Baroque Style (1671 and 1757–1768) ====
The first baroque period took place in connection with the repairs of the church in 1671. The reason for the repair was damage by the strong gale in 1670 which damaged the tower, roof frames and glazing of the windows. The new tower with cupola and baroquization of the interior were probably the work of builder Daniel Rynd. In this period the great bell from 1620 was re-poured by the bellfounder Nicholas Loewe. Also the altar of Staroboleslav's Mother of God was restored.

The second baroque period of reconstruction is related with occupying of the church by the Prussian military in 1757. Those struggles for the church and tests of weapons caused the damage of the masonry and plastering. Restorations were made mainly in the interior. New altars were set. Two new bells were cast by Jan Jiri Kuehner to the tower – bigger bell Apollinaire and smaller one Anna. The set of the new organ with sculptures of St Wenceslas and two angels on the old gothic platform in the west nave was the important intervention in 1768.

==== Neo-gothic Style (1893–1898) ====
The church seen from Albertov, before 1917, photo by Jaroslav Petrák

Some heavy rifts were detected in the construction of the church in the 19th century. This was a reason for general reconstruction of the church made by architect Mocker. He tore down the old gothic platform in the west part and replaced it with a replica. In the windows of the nave, he replaced old tracery for the new ones. Both northern portals were changed. The main portal was only fixed by Mocker but the other one smaller lancet arch is Mocker's neo-gothic replacement for the original gothic portal.

New doors were set up in both portals according to Mocker's plans. The west gable wall of the nave was torn down and replaced. The whole building got new roof frames. Weathered blocks in the exterior were replaced and the church was plastered. Principal moulding was made in neo-gothic style. Mocker revealed the original gothic wall painting and probably also the original polychromous plated of the arch groins and girders in the interior. In the southern wall of the presbytery, he perforated a new portal which he led to the new built neo-gothic sacristy. The sacristy was connected to the choir by the hall of stones. He adjusted the enter under the choir to the tower. In the tower he fixed the inner staircase.

=== The nave ===
One nave with narrower five-sided presbytery and side tower by the southwestern corner is in the ground plan of the church. The quadratic sacristy with entrance hall completes the construction.

The ground plan is created by a long rectangle made from five bays. The exterior of the nave is relatively stern, decorated by only ten massive load-bearing pillars. These pillars are reinforced by sandstones blocks and strapped in lower third with shaped moulding. On the tops of rests there is a combination of the counter and saddle shelters. Corner load-bearing pillars are built diagonally. Great windows of the nave provide great illumination of space of the church. Wide trough stone moulding is original. There are visible also some stonemasons' marks. There used to be a window in the western side of the church which was walled up in the 16th century and nowadays it is hidden under the plastering. The nave is ended by steep triangular gable walls in the west and the eaSt The western gable wall is segmented by three pointed sunken niches. Two entrance portals lead to the nave from the north.

Large cross-shaped ribbed arch is one of the most important parts of inner space. It has nearly semi-circular slightly pointed profile. Stone pear groins fit on the wall's five-sided tracery console and on the tops they are tied by moderately appearing circular pins.

Neo-gothic gallery on the west of the nave is created by two pointed profiled arcades with central pillars culminate with parapet decorated by fields of odd traceries. Semi-pillar is approaching to the central pillar and carries profiled socle of an oriel which was originally set as platform altar. The organs located on the church-gallery are from the end of the 19th century.

=== The Presbytery ===
Ground plan is created by crosswise fields and deep five-sided ending. The presbytery is located on the same socle as the nave. It is supported by eight load-bearing pillars similar to more tiny rests supporting the nave.

The windows in the presbytery are narrower than the windows in the nave and they fill only two sectioned traceries. The windows sit on the windowsill on the profiled moulding as same as in the nave. The moulding is also in the presbytery where narrow shafts of the arch ascend from the mouldings. Sculptural decorated heads are situated on the tops of the shafts. On the top of the column heads are closed by slight polygonal profiled covering slabs and pear ribs derive from those slabs. The ribs are attached to the target pins. The whole arch is completed by crosswised ribs in a semi-circle and creates the impression of a spreading arch.

The presbytery is connected with the nave by the stone pointed triumphal arch sitting on the profiled socle with reciprocally cut deeply channelled tracery. The floor of the presbytery and the nave are covered with plasters.

=== The tower ===
The ground plan of the tower is square, connecting to the nave in western field of the north side. The tower stands on the same socle as the rest of the church. Its pointed masonry is plastered and on the individual groins we can spot revealed cubiform reinforce. The construction is divided into two parts. The first part is horizontally divided into three parts. The walls of the bottom part are smooth without any windows. The central and also the biggest part contains two rectangular windows in the south and one window in the eaSt There are three big, pointed windows on the upper part and lead to the south, east and weSt There is rectangular slit window heading to the north.

The second part is created by gothic octagon. Its walls are divided by four windows with stone jamb. The tower ends by steep pyramidal column roof.

The space under the tower used to serve as sacristy. During the neo-gothic period, this function in this space was stopped. The tower is filled by the stone staircase from the 19th century. It is held by four pillars. Considering the mightiness of the staircase the cross arch on the first floor was removed. Despite the reconstruction in the 19th century the second floor has its cohesive space with brick ground and beam ceiling from the period of neo-gothic architecture.

There is a bell tower inside the gothic octagon which contains where is nowadays the only bell St Apollinaire. The bell is decorated by vegetable ornaments and a relief of St Apollinaire. There is also a Latin inscription with chronograms carved into the bell.

=== Equipment ===
The equipment was taken mostly from the near temple of Virgin Mary in Karlov in 1780.

==== The presbytery ====
The whole ending of the presbytery is taken by the main altar Assumption of Virgin Mary in Karlov. The altar, which is dated back to 1740–1744, is brought from Karlov. Its tabernacle contains a small carving of Golgota from 1800. There are statues of angels situated on both sides of the tabernacle. There is a statue of Virgin Mary above the tabernacle carried away to the heaven where her coronation is awaiting by the Holy Trinity. Four Evangelists are standing on the main moulding. All of those statues reportedly come from the workshop of Richard Prachner, very important sculptor (we can find his works in many places in Prague, for example in the Brevnov monastery). Two big tin candlesticks are situated in front of the altar and is from the second half of the 17th century.

The next altar in the presbytery, the altar of Golgotha, is situated on its southern side. It is decorated by the statues of the Virgin Mary and Saint John the Evangelist which come most likely from the Czech Baroque sculptor J. A. Quitainer from 1730. The altar table is covered by a drape from the 18th century, the so-called antependium. There is a coffer inside the altar table with the remains of monks who were killed in 1611, which also comes from Karlov.

There is an original Gothic sanctuarium in the southern wall of the presbytery, late Renaissance sanctuary with massive forged small doors is situated in the north wall. On the north wall of the presbytery are two paintings: the twelve-year-old Jesus in the temple and Christ and two adulterous women. Both paintings were painted by the Austrian painter M. V. Halbax.

==== The nave ====
There is a rococo pulpit from 18th century next to the triumphal arch separating the nave and the presbytery. The ambon is decorated by the scene with two angels which should symbolize the Silence and Life of St John of Nepomuk. On the small roof of the pulpit there are three more statues of angels. One of them holds bishop's mitre of St Apollinaire. Statues of little angels come from sculptor R. Prachner. The small roof is ended with a statue of St John of Nepomuk, apparently made by Czech-Austrian sculptor I. Platzer.

Two side altars are symmetrically situated next to triumphal arch. The altar of Virgin Mary from Karlov is on the south side and altar of the birth of Christ on the north side. Altar on the south side was brought from Karlov. It comes from the end of the first half of the 18th century. It is the board-type altar. It is decorated with bent volutes and statues of St Wenceslas and John of Nepomuk. Those statues come apparently from the workshop of Prague sculptor J. Slanzovsky. There's a painting of Virgin Mary from Karlov between statues. It was painted in 1697 by the Czech-German painter J. J. Heinsch. Heinsch was inspired by the picture of breasts of Virgin Mary which is included in northern nave altar. This painting is known as secret. Pregnant women prayed to it and offered a lot of gold and silver object to it. Part of the attachment of the altar is a painting of Virgin Mary from Pasov. It is a copy of the painting from the first half of the 18th century. The second mentioned side altar of Birth of Christ from 1730 to 1740 is apparently original. The same pattern repeats same as the pattern used at the altar on the southern side. In the centre there is title painting surrounded by two statues of St Andrew and St Nicholas.

There is also a copy of the painting of Virgin Mary Pasovska in the attachment of the altar. One more work of art – painting of the breasts of Virgin Mary – is situated in a brass gilt frame and it was brought from Karlov. This work was made by painter J. C. Monnot. There is a grave ledger of Juliana Dlouhoveska from 1671. It is located in the south wall of the nave. There's also a tin baptismal font formed as reversed bell and stands on three legs with paws and heads of beavers.

The walls of the nave are decorated by the original gothic frescos from the period so called beautiful style from the end of the 14th century. On the southern wall frescos depict Jesus Christ handing keys over to St Peter. Both characters surrounded by Apostles have bosoms of prophets under their feet. There is Virgin Mary depicted standing and wearing a safety coat surrounded by six female saints from each side on the opposite side. Also those saints are having similar bosoms under their feet as on the south side.

== Curiosities ==
We can find a hypothesis in some sources about the location of significant buildings built in the period of Charles IV. They are set by a lot of field-geometrical relations and a Christian mysticism. The five New town churches established by Charles IV. create a regular crucifix. Branch from north to the south creates a connecting line of Church of St Catherine and Church of the Annunciation of the Blessed Virgin Mary Na Slupi, branch from west to east Church of Virgin Mary and St Charles the Great and Emauzy Monastery. Those branches cross in Church of St Apollinaire. Towers of churches Na Trávníčku, St Apollinaire, Catherine's stand in one line and they have the same architectonic characteristic. This hypothesis leads to speculations that location of these churches was planned in the original project of the city, although those individual church buildings were built in this part of New Town one by one (Slovany 1347, Karlov 1352, Catherine 1355, Travnicek 1360, Apollinaire 1362). The cross of those buildings meant an unusual blessing to the town.

There is a modern legend about the origin of the chapter: „Borivoj II. who had a conflict with his brother Vladislaus was arrested by the emperor Henry and taken to Germany. He was a prisoner in fortress Hamerstein on Ryn for six years until the emperor wanted to execute him. Finally St Apollinaire, an apprentice of St Peter and a martyr, appeared to Borivoj. He asked Borivoj: Do you want to return to Bohemia? And St Apollinaire suddenly transferred Borivoj to his homeland near today's town Sladska which was a favourite residence of princes of Prague of Slavnikov's. That is why in 1118 the prince established church and a chapter. From that moment St Apollinaire was honoured. This legend was published by František Ruth with no specific sources from chronicles, which is why the origin of this legend is very disputable.

== Surroundings ==
In close surroundings there is botanical garden of Faculty of Science Charles University in Prague, Faculty of Science Charles University in Prague, Faculty of Mathematics and Physics, biological and geological section of Charles University, Institute of Pathology of the First Faculty of Medicine and General University Hospital of St Alzbeta Hospital. There are also two churches – Church of Virgin Mary by Alzbetines with the chapel of St Tekla and the church of Virgin Mary and St Charles the Great situated in Karlov.

The church also gave a name to nearby maternity hospital by Apollinaire.
