= Stelle, Illinois =

- Unincorporated community
- Stelle subdivision entrance sign

- Location within the state of Illinois
- Coordinates: 40°57′00″N 88°09′12″W
- Country: United States
- State: Illinois
- County: Ford County
- Township: Rogers Township
- Elevation: 705 ft (215 m)
- Time zone: UTC-6 (CST)
  - Summer (DST): UTC-5 (CDT)
- ZIP code: 60919
- Area code: 815
- GNIS feature ID: 2011616

Stelle is an unincorporated community located in Rogers Township in northern Ford County, Illinois, United States. As of 2013, its estimated population was 100.

The community was established as an intentional community in the early 1970s. In 1982, Stelle transitioned to a standard homeowner's association, a structure it maintains today.

== Historical overview ==
Stelle was founded in 1973 by the Stelle Group, a Chicago-based organization established by Richard Kieninger, a writer and teacher who also played a role in founding Adelphi, Texas. In the 1950s, Kieninger was a student of the Lemurian Fellowship in Ramona, California.

Its founders, who belonged to a recently formed group from Chicago, purchased farmland in the northern part of Ford County and developed a suburban-style community. Stelle initially operated as a private community.

In 1982, Stelle transitioned into a homeowner association and opened to the public. Following the transition, Stelle became notable for the incorporation of solar panels on many homes and residents' emphasis on cooperative enterprises. The village has its own telephone company, providing telephone, television, and internet services. Additional community features include a community garden co-op, a tool co-op, and a weekly communal dinner. Stelle also hosts educational events open to the public.
