= Adelphi, Texas =

Intentional community in Texas, US

Coordinates: 32.839373°N 96.144521°W

The Adelphi Community is an intentional community, population 16, 25 miles east of Dallas, Texas, United States. It has streets, private homes, eight townhouses, a community well, community gardens and a sewage treatment plant.

== History ==
The community was built by members of the Adelphi Organization, founded by Richard Kieninger in 1976. During the 1950s, Kieninger had been a student of the Lemurian Fellowship in Ramona, California, which teaches Lemurian Philosophy. In 1963, Kieninger published his own book, The Ultimate Frontier, under the pen name Eklal Kueshana.

=== Community philosophies ===
The Ultimate Frontier details tenets of Lemurian Philosophy, which stresses love and positive living. Early editions also included predictions Kieninger claimed were provided by representatives of secret organizations known as Brotherhoods. Kieninger wrote that nuclear war would begin in November 1999, culminating in worldwide devastation, and that natural cataclysms would begin on May 5, 2000, submerging most of the United States and producing a new land mass in the Pacific Ocean. There, the Nation of God would be built. When neither event occurred, he said he had misunderstood the Brotherhoods' predictions. The 2000 edition, published by the Adelphi Organization, continues to include general predictions of Armageddon and Doomsday, but without dates.

Kieninger lived at Adelphi until his death, of esophageal cancer, in early 2002. He never explained the failure of his predictions.

== Community purpose ==
The Adelphi Organization's website says:

"...The Adelphi Organization was founded...to help create the climate and institutional patterns to be used initially in the Nation of God, by sponsoring the development of the community of Adelphi, Texas. The membership has accepted the responsibility for being a precursor city to the Nation of God and educating future generations in the Lemurian Philosophy. It is our job to survive the cataclysm (Armageddon and Doomsday, ed.) by means of technology and positive karma and quickly rebuild and establish a highly cultured Lemurian civilization."

Residence is limited to members of The Adelphi Organization, which also manages community affairs.

== Sister communities ==
The Adelphi Community has a sister community in Stelle, Illinois, which was founded in 1973, also based on Kieninger's writings. Residence there has been open to anyone since 1983 and the community disavowed Kieninger in 1985. The population of the Stelle Community is 101.
