= Cabery, Illinois =

Cabery
- Village
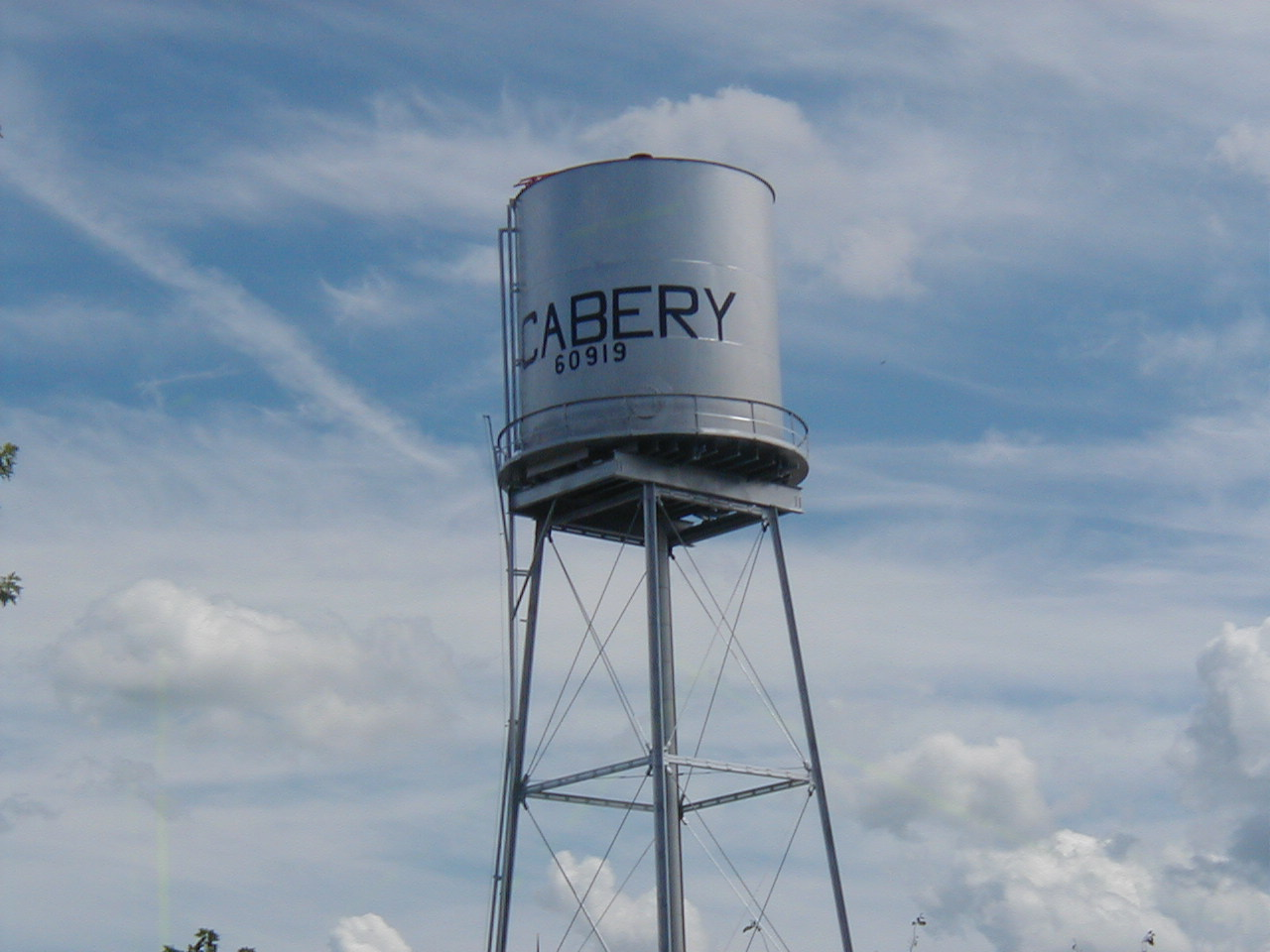
- The Cabery water tower

- Location of Cabery in Ford County, Illinois.
- Coordinates: 40°59′47″N 88°12′10″W
- Country: United States
- State: Illinois
- County: Ford and Kankakee
- Townships: Rogers, Norton

Area
  - Total: 0.34 sq mi (0.89 km^{2})
  - Land: 0.34 sq mi (0.89 km^{2})
  - Water: 0 sq mi (0.00 km^{2})
- Elevation: 696 ft (212 m)

Population (2020)
  - Total: 231
  - Density: 672.4/sq mi (259.62/km^{2})
- Time zone: UTC-6 (CST)
  - Summer (DST): UTC-5 (CDT)
- ZIP code: 60919
- Area code: 815
- FIPS code: 17-10292
- GNIS feature ID: 2397519

Cabery is a village located in Ford and Kankakee counties in the U.S. state of Illinois. The population was 231 at the 2020 census down from 266 in the 2010 census.

== History ==
Cabery was founded around 1878 after the Kankakee and Southwestern Railroad (now KBSR) was built through the area. It was named after John R. Caberry, an early settler and merchant from Chicago. The community was incorporated as a village in 1881.

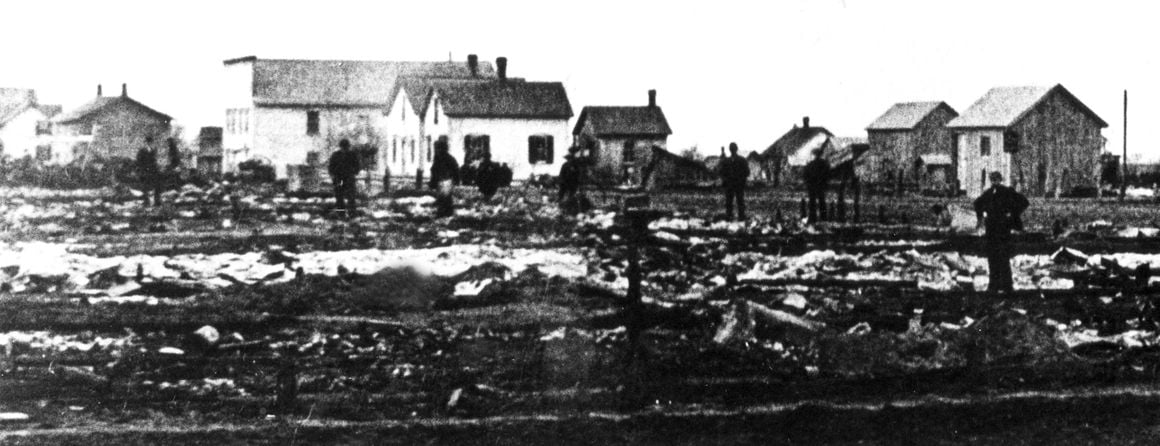
The smoldering debris of Cabery's business district.

The settlement had one early setback when a fire broke out on May 3, 1885, that consumed the south side of Main Street. (Ford County side) It was believed to have started in a millinery shop and went on to destroy 24 businesses as well as 14 homes. Resulting in an estimated $100,000 in damages. Unbelievably, no injuries or deaths were reported.

The Cabery High School served the community from 1912 until 1946 in which their football team the Cabery Cardinals would become state-wide stars. They were said to have once even played against inmates from the Joliet Correctional Center.

The village saw a peak population of 385 individuals in the 1900 Census and despite a small uptick in the 1980s has since seen a gradual decline.

== Geography ==
According to the 2021 census gazetteer files, Cabery has a total area of 0.34 square miles (0.88 km^{2}), all land.

The county line between Kankakee County and Ford County runs right through the middle of town on Main Street.

== Demographics ==
Historical population
Census	Pop.	Note	%±
1880	114		—
1890	342		200.0%
1900	385		12.6%
1910	321		−16.6%
1920	299		−6.9%
1930	290		−3.0%
1940	299		3.1%
1950	290		−3.0%
1960	293		1.0%
1970	287		−2.0%
1980	327		13.9%
1990	268		−18.0%
2000	263		−1.9%
2010	266		1.1%
2020	231		−13.2%
U.S. Decennial Census

As of the 2020 census there were 231 people, 99 households, and 74 families residing in the village. The population density was 671.51 inhabitants per square mile (259.27/km^{2}). There were 115 housing units at an average density of 334.30 per square mile (129.07/km^{2}). The racial makeup of the village was 97.40% White, 0.00% African American, 0.43% Native American, 0.00% Asian, 0.00% Pacific Islander, 0.43% from other races, and 1.73% from two or more races. Hispanic or Latino of any race were 2.16% of the population.

There were 99 households, out of which 31.3% had children under the age of 18 living with them, 47.47% were married couples living together, 17.17% had a female householder with no husband present, and 25.25% were non-families. 19.19% of all households were made up of individuals, and 9.09% had someone living alone who was 65 years of age or older. The average household size was 2.99 and the average family size was 2.63.

The village's age distribution consisted of 27.3% under the age of 18, 4.2% from 18 to 24, 27.7% from 25 to 44, 27.7% from 45 to 64, and 13.1% who were 65 years of age or older. The median age was 37.4 years. For every 100 females, there were 103.1 males. For every 100 females age 18 and over, there were 105.4 males.

The median income for a household in the village was $52,344, and the median income for a family was $52,188. Males had a median income of $48,920 versus $25,208 for females. The per capita income for the village was $31,818. About 16.2% of families and 17.7% of the population were below the poverty line, including 36.6% of those under age 18 and 0.0% of those age 65 or over.

== Commerce ==
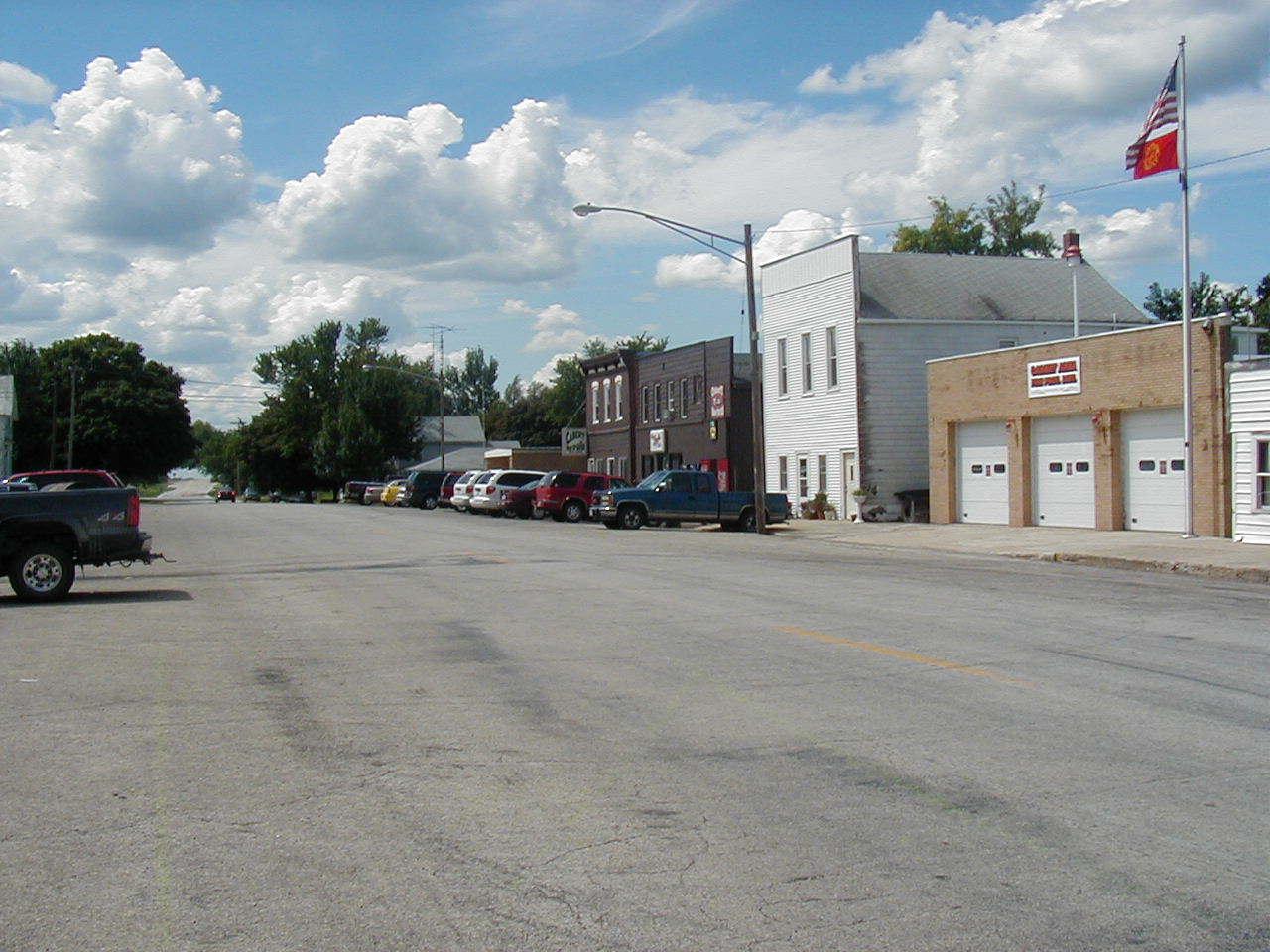
Main Street in Cabery

Commerce in Cabery includes a post office, a small hardware store, the Cabery Bar and Grill restaurant, and the Cabery Fertilizer Company. There is also a grain elevator located on the Kankakee County side of Cabery.

== Recreation ==
Cabery has a park with basketball courts, a playground, and a lighted softball field with a press box.

There is also a small pond called "the Clay Hole," which, although unsuitable for swimming, is a popular fishing pond during the warm months. Both bluegill and largemouth bass have been caught there.
