= 1885 Cabery fire =

Conflagration in Illinois, United States

Coordinates: 40.996°N 88.206°W

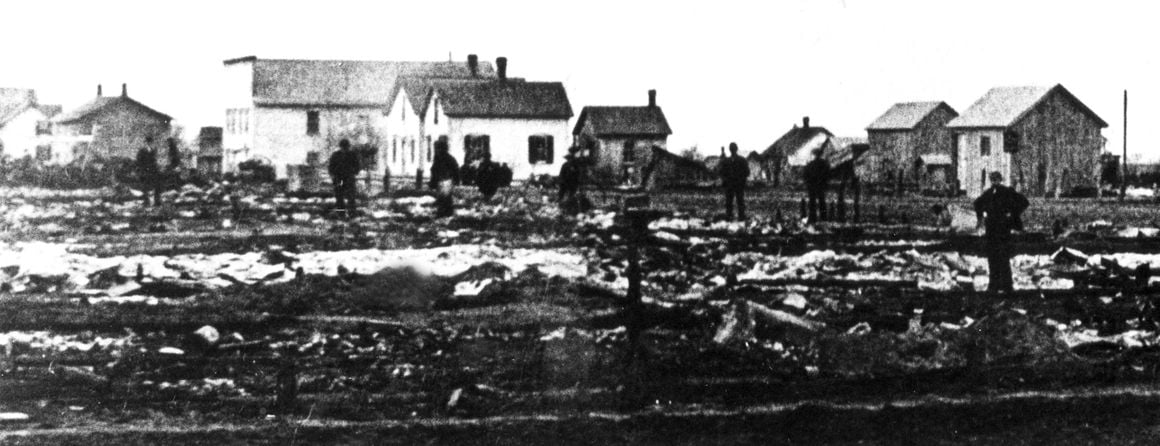
- The smoldering debris of Cabery's business district.
- Date: May 3, 1885
- Time: Started 3:00 AM Central Time
- Location: Cabery, Illinois, United States
- Cause: Millinery shop
- Deaths: 0 fatalities, 0 injured
- Property damage: $100,000 in 1885: $3.3 million in 2025

The 1885 Cabery fire was a disaster that took place on May 3, 1885, in the village of Cabery, Illinois. The blaze would ultimately destroy 24 businesses and 14 homes while unbelievably causing zero deaths or injuries.

== Event description ==
In the early hours of Sunday, May 3, 1885, an unnamed individual happened to be walking by a millinery shop owned by the Hilborne family when they noticed flames growing from the building. Thanks to this unknown person, the family was able to escape from their upstairs home without trouble. However, the flames quickley spread to the general store next door and the rest of the business district. Once the majority of the village was notified of the fire, it was noted that three "suspicious-looking characters" were seen leaving on a freight train. Similarly to other villages of the era, Cabery's businesses were almost all entirely made of wood. It is also worth noting that Cabery had no fire department, only a bucket brigade. Which, despite the townspeople's efforts, had little effect. Citizens reached out to the city of Kankakee for help. However, the city had no fire department of their own and were able to offer little in the way of help. The largest structure in the district was the Commercial Hotel which also within hours arrupted in flames, of which the guests residing within barely managed to escape. By sunrise the entire south side of Main Street was reduced to rubble, many of the structures only having their foundations remain. By early afternoon the flames were finally quelled.

== Aftermath ==
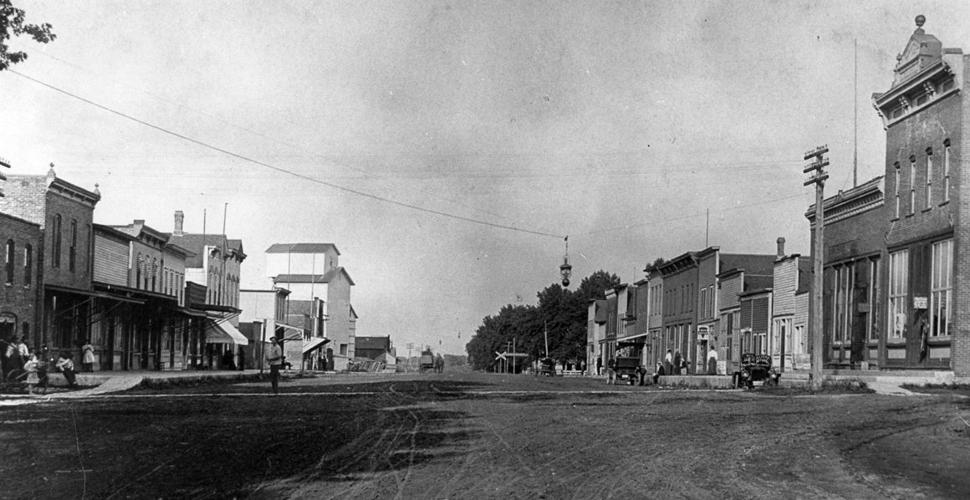
Main Street looking east c.1910

Despite zero deaths or injuries being reported, the village was left in complete shambles. A total of twenty-four businesses and fourteen homes were completely destroyed. The entirety of the south side of the street was gone (the portion of the village located in Ford County) along with a furniture and butcher shop on the north side within Kankakee County. Fifteen families were left homeless and the village suffered an estimated total of $100,000 in damages, or about $3.3 million in 2026. With only around $25,000 being covered by various insurances. Early rumors believed that the fire was started through incendiary means, due to the fact that a gold watch and $75 (equivalent to $2,500) were missing from Mrs. Hilborne's home. The three men seen leaving the village were arrested the following day in Gilman by orders sent via telegraph. The men were put on trial in Kankakee and later acquitted on May 5. For several years the community's retail market stagnated as not a single business was left standing. It is unknown if the state of Illinois sent any resources to the small village following the fire, but it is likely that then Governor Richard Oglesby was notified. Cabery slowly recovered and Main Street was rebuilt by the early 1900s.

Cabery built its first firehouse in 1965 and in 2022 a new/modern station was built.
