= Community of Saint Anselm =

Coordinates: 51.4954°N 0.1201°W

- Orientation: Anglican
- Polity: Hierarchical
- Leader: Archbishop of Canterbury
- Members: 16 residential, 20 community based, total of 36.
- Official website: stanselm.org.uk

The Community of Saint Anselm is religious community of young people belonging to various Christian denominations, devoted to prayer, study and service to the poor. It is based at Lambeth Palace in London, home of the Archbishop of Canterbury.

It consists of an annually replaced 16 residential members from around the world, and around 20 non-residential members who live and work in the London area. Members may be aged 20–35. The community is dedicated to Saint Anselm, and is under the patronage of the current Archbishop of Canterbury, the primus inter pares of the Anglican Communion. The archbishop serves as the abbot, assisted by a prior, and the community abides by a Benedictine rule of life. The Community of Saint Anselm is of an ecumenical nature; part of its purpose is to bring people from different countries and different Christian denominations together, and four members of the Catholic Chemin Neuf Community live with and support the community.

The quasi-monastic institute was founded in September 2015 at the initiative of the Archbishop of Canterbury, Justin Welby, who stated his intention "that Lambeth Palace be not so much a historic place of power and authority, but a place from which blessing and service reach to the ends of the earth". Part of the rationale for the new community was a desire to meet the needs of young people considering a monastic path but reluctant to embark upon a potentially lifelong commitment. The American theologian Stanley Hauerwas was cited as an influence on the new initiative. Comparisons have been drawn to a gap year, though this analogy was not promoted by the archbishop's chaplain, Jo Bailey Wells, who was instrumental in establishing the community. In 2018 Welby said of the community, "it’s grown: it’s developed, it’s got much deeper roots, it’s wonderful — and we’re seeing other communities growing up in other places".
