= Free and Real =

Greek nonprofit organisation

Coordinates: 38°52′51″N 23°04′39″E

Free and Real is a non-profit organisation and experimental eco-cohousing community located in the municipality of Istiaia-Aidipsos, northern Euboea, Greece, about 200 km (120 mi) north-west of Athens. The organisation is primarily a school for self-sufficiency/sustainability, and a research centre for ways of living in harmony with nature.

One of Free and Real's main areas of research focuses on structures and buildings, aiming to find the ideal structural shapes and trade-offs between eco-friendly materials and product longevity, creating minimum waste, implementing energy efficiency and bioclimatic integration with the environment, all of the while complying with Greek construction laws. Its research also focuses on farming, including fruits, vegetables, herbs and nuts, which are grown throughout the year on a seasonal basis using the natural farming methods developed by Masanobu Fukuoka.

== Name and history ==
Free and Real, an acronym for "Freedom of Resources for Everyone, Everywhere, and Respect, Equality, Awareness, and Learning," was coined in January 2009. The organization was officially founded later that year in Athens, Greece, where its founding members lived.

Initially, the group focused on research and attended seminars and workshops across Greece and Europe on sustainability, self-sufficiency, natural farming, and eco-building. They also visited eco-communities to gain practical experience.

In 2010, Free and Real began hosting its own workshops in Athens on similar topics. By May 2010, the organization relocated to northern Euboea, where donated property became a test site for natural farming and eco-building projects.

While the name suggests "free," participation involves fees for food, accommodation, and workshops. These contributions support the organization’s activities.

== The Telaithrion Project ==
Free and Real acquired a 3-acre plot of land at Mt. Telethrion, which is being transformed into a multipurpose experimental project called The Telaithrion Project. The three main purposes of this project are: building a school for self-sufficiency, creating a research center for sustainability and low-tech eco-friendly development, and creating a model eco-community capable of being replicated elsewhere.

The Telaithrion Project is the main development project of Free and Real, and has attracted the attention of national and international media, including Alpha TV, Ant1, and Star in Greece; Deusche Welle in Germany, Reuters, Swedish National Television, TV Arte in France, and others.

== Seminars and workshops ==
One of Free and Real's community's founding aims was the sharing of knowledge. Since 2010, it organises seminars and workshops on a fortnightly basis focusing on various topics including self-sufficiency, environmental building, natural farming, nutrition & health, traditional herbal soaps and remedies, and others. Free and Real has organised several seminars/workshops about Natural Farming in conjunction with the Center for Natural Farming in Edessa, Greece, in which Fukuoka's philosophy was taught to more than 100 students.

== Community life ==
Free and Real aims to promote a long term community-based way of life that respects individuality and privacy, but does not alienate people. The Telaithrion Project is designed in such a way where each resident will occupy a personal yurt, built around a larger communal space yurt to be shared by six personal yurts, thus ensuring the interaction of members.

== Decisions and organisation ==
The decision making process adopted by Free and Real is based on the scientific method, where every decision is considered separated from emotions and opinions. Decisions are generally arrived to by consensus after examining the options using the following criteria:

- Quantitative impact: how many people are served by this specific solution/ idea/ choice/ decision
- Qualitative impact: how important is the implementation of the solution/ idea/ choice/ decision and how deeply is it going to affect people in their living conditions
- Time frame: how feasible is the implementation and application of the solution/ idea/ choice/ decision within a reasonable time frame
- Difficulty of the achievement: how simple, as to its implementation, is the solution/ idea/ choice/ decision and what is the predicted cost in resources such as man-hours, money, environment, energy, etc.
- Duration in time: what is the lifetime of this solution/ idea/ choice/ decision

== See also ==
- Ecovillage
- Intentional community
- Vegetarianism
