= World Youth Day 1997 =

International Catholic youth event

World Youth Day
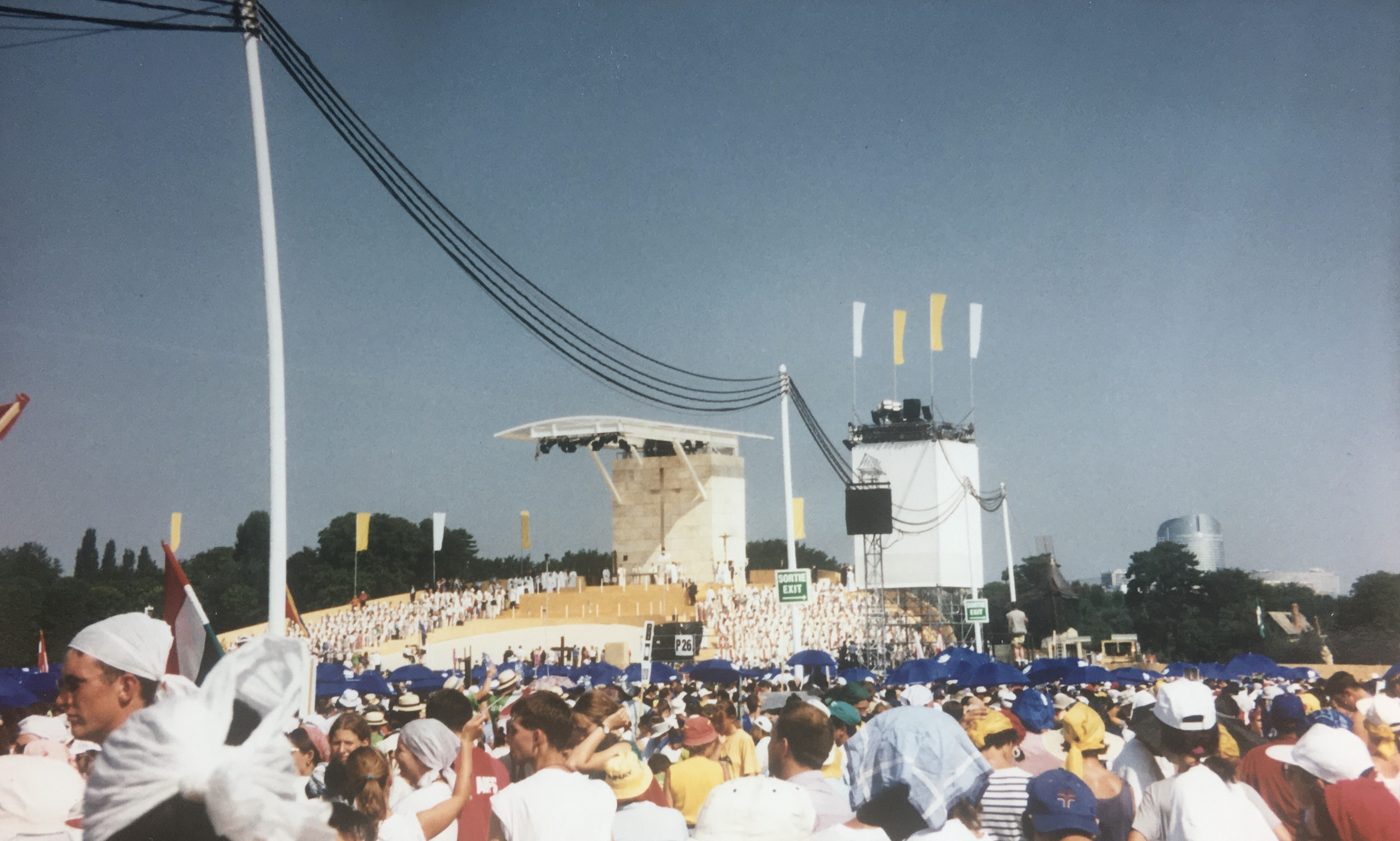
- Paris World Youth Day 1997
- Date: 19–24 August 1997
- Location: Paris, France
- Type: Youth festival
- Theme: "Master where do you live? Come and see". (Jn 1: 38-39)
- Organised by: Catholic Church
- Participants: Pope John Paul II
- Previous: 1995 Manila
- Next: 2000 Rome
- Website: Vatican

The World Youth Day 1997 (French: Journées mondiales de la jeunesse 1997) took place from 19 to 24 August 1997 in Paris, France. About 1,200,000 young people took part in the meeting.

== Choice of location ==
Pope John Paul II announced that he had chosen Paris as the site of this international meeting during the overnight vigil celebration of World Youth Day in Manila (Vigil of January 14, 1995) in front of five million people, with these words:

"Today I wish to announce that the next World Youth Day will be celebrated in Paris, France, in the summer of 1997. Mary of the New Advent! We entrust you with the preparations for this next joyful meeting in the heart of Europe."

The choice of the cradle nation of the Enlightenment and atheism was not at all random. In the message of invitation to the WYD of 15 August 1996 at Castel Gandolfo, the Pope, inviting young people to participate in the year following the World Youth Day in Paris, said:

"We live in an era of great transformations, in which ideologies quickly set, which seemed to have long resisted the wear and tear of time, and borders and borders were being redesigned on the planet. Humanity often finds itself uncertain, confused and worried, but the word of God does not end; it travels through history and, in changing events, remains stable and luminous. The faith of the Church is founded on Jesus Christ, the only savior of the world: yesterday, today and forever."

== Theme ==
The theme of the meeting was: "Master where do you live? Come and see". (Jn 1: 38-39).

== The anthem ==
The hymn of the 12th WYD was Maitre et Seigneur, Venu chez nous (Master and Lord, Come to us).

== The program of the days ==
The Catholic Church in France had indeed wished that the dynamism and the meetings of this gathering do not benefit not only in Paris and the Île-de-France but that all the French dioceses can also participate, therefore many several innovations were made. Archbishop of Paris, Cardinal Jean-Marie Lustiger allow the stay of young people in the dioceses of the host country, in this event was firstly performed a Calvary. and then a three-day "youth festival" just before the final gathering in the host city of WYD.

This edition of WYD was the first organized with the formula currently in vogue, that is a week of meetings, parties and cultural exchanges between young pilgrims and young residents, with diocesan days and the festival of youth, and a daily possibility of participating in Holy Mass or catechesis, and receive the Sacrament of Reconciliation.

=== 21 August ===
The first meeting of young people with the Pope took place in Paris on August 21. The Pope was welcomed by representatives of young people. In the welcome address, John Paul II pointed out that the first time officially at World Youth Day were young people from the countries of the former Soviet Union - Russians, Ukrainians, Belarusians, Lithuanians, Latvians, Estonians, Kazakhs and representatives of the other Central Asian republics and Christians from the Caucasus (600 thousand participants).

=== 23 August ===
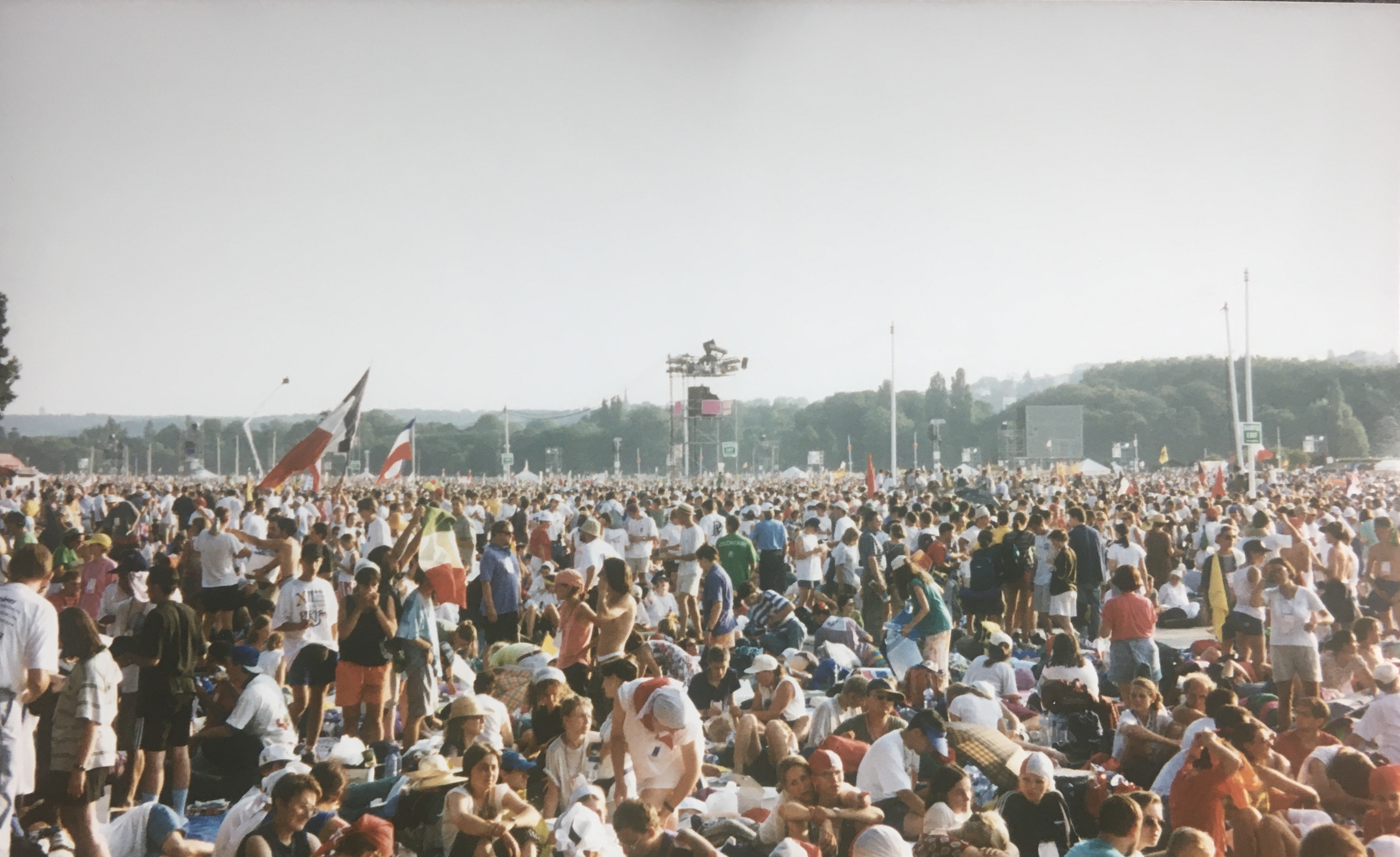
Vigil at Longchamp.

Mass for participants of the 6th International Youth Forum was celebrated on August 23. On that day, the Pope met with the benefactors and organizers at the headquarters of the Apostolic Nunciature. About 800,000 people took part in the evening vigil at Longchamp.

=== 24 August ===
The final Mass of the event was celebrated by John Paul II at the Longchamp Racecourse, presenting 1,100,000/ 1,200,000 and from the Czech Republic to Paris, 2000 pilgrims arrived. The pope also turned to non-Catholics seeking answers on the faith.

== Invited ==
Among the personalities invited, Pope John Paul II also called Archbishop François-Xavier Nguyên Van Thuận to give his experience to the young.
