= W. B. Fox's Villa =

Historic farmhouse in Victoria, Australia

Coordinates: 37.7894°S 144.9910°E

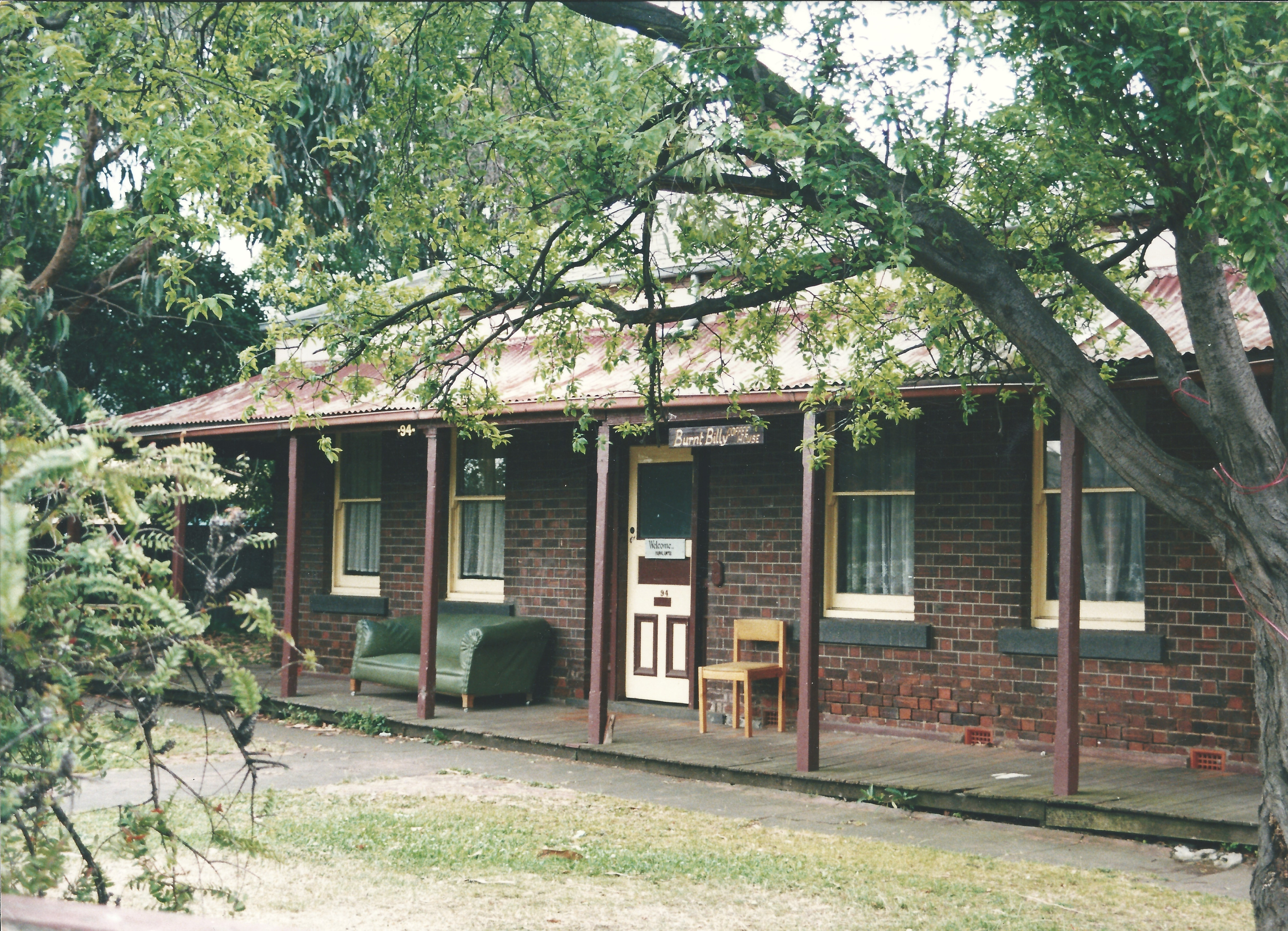
Burnt Billy Coffee House operating within the House of the Gentle Bunyip (c. 1997)

W. B. Fox's Villa is a historic farmhouse built in 1867 in Clifton Hill, Victoria, Australia. It was also known as The House of the Gentle Bunyip, an intentional Christian community established by Athol Gill. In the 1990s, the building had fallen into disrepair and was planned to be demolished. Clifton Hill residents picketed the site for over 400 days, ultimately preventing its demolition. In 2008, the building was subsequently re-purposed as supported accommodation for people with schizophrenia. W.B. Fox's Villa is included in the statement of significance for the Clifton Hill West Precinct area in the Victorian Heritage Database.

== William Fox's Villa ==
W. B. Fox's Villa, located at 94 Hodgkinson St, was constructed in 1867 and is listed as heritage significant. as "socially significant as focus of conservation battle". It is now included in a Heritage Overlay in the Planning Scheme of Victoria (Australia). The Baptist Church, now Community Church of St Mark, and church hall, now Athol Gill Centre were built next door in the early 1900s.

The villa retains a large garden on the corner of Gold St and Hodgkinson St that overlooks the Darling Gardens, set out in 1864 by Clement Hodgkinson.

The House of the Gentle Bunyip was named after the children's book, The Bunyip of Berkeleys Creek, by Jenny Wagner about a mythical Bunyip. It was the final subject of the book, Brimstone to Bunyip.

== Demolition proposal and community campaign ==
In November 1997, the Baptist Union of Victoria sold the house to developers who applied for a permit to demolish the house.

Residents Group, The 3068 Group nominated the house to be listed as state significant on the Victorian Heritage Register, but only local significance was supported by the Heritage Council.

The residents of Clifton Hill and North Fitzroy banded together to defend the historic property at the Victorian Civil and Administrative Tribunal. VCAT subsequently issued a permit for demolition.

The residents set up a picket to prevent demolition of the house. A caravan was hired, a brazier donated, and tarpaulins were hoisted for protection from the severity of sun and storms. A roster of 100 volunteers, from 18 to 85 years old, was compiled.

The picket was manned for 427 days, 24 hours a day, 7 days per week. It was the longest community picket in Australian history.

The picket is included in the statement of significance for the Clifton Hill West Precinct to demonstrate the history of community involvement engaged in "articulating public interest priorities". "The House of the Gentle Bunyip, constructed in three phases by two families between 1867 and the 1920s was the subject of controversy in the late 1990s when the local community successfully saved the building from demolition, after staging a picket lasting over 400 days."

== Conversion to social housing ==
The house was converted to social housing following a $3.4 million makeover. by pH Architects and was opened by the Hon Richard Wynne in 2008. The development included two other historic dwellings adjacent to the church.

In 2001, Fox's Villa was included in the Heritage Overlay and protected from demolition.
