= Jansiac =

French intentional community

Jansiac is a French intentional community founded in 1974.
