= Athol Gill =

William Athol Gill (1937–1992) was an influential Australian theologian and one of the leaders of the radical discipleship movement in Australia.

== Education ==
Gill attended the NSW Baptist Theological College, Spurgeon's College, and the University of London, obtaining a Bachelor of Divinity degree with Honours in 1965; and thereafter he attended Rüschlikon International Baptist Seminary and the University of Zürich, obtaining a master's degree in 1967 and a D.Theol. degree in 1971.

== Professional career ==
Gill served as a lecturer at the Baptist Theological College of Queensland in 1971-2; with the Methodist Training College in Brisbane in 1973–1974; and with Whitley College within the University of Melbourne, initially as dean of studies from 1975 to 1979, and then as professor of New Testament from 1979 until his death in 1992.

== Intentional community ==
Gill was founder of two intentional Christian communities, the House of Freedom in Brisbane and the House of the Gentle Bunyip in Melbourne, both of which were linked informally with the House of the New World in Sydney.

== Recognition ==
Gill's significance is commemorated in the naming of the Athol Gill Centre, within Whitley College and opened in 2001; in a collection of scholarly essays in honour of Gill, published in 2002; in a biography by fellow theologian Harold Pidwell, published in 2007; and in a commemorative screen by artist David Wong, completed in 2012.

== Publications ==
- — (1971). The Cleansing of the Temple: A Study in the Editorial Methods and Theology of the Second Evangelist (D.Theol. thesis). University of Zürich.
- — (1976). "Christian Social Responsibility". In Padilla, C.R. (ed.). The New Face of Evangelicalism: An International Symposium on the Lausanne Covenant. London: Hodder and Stoughton and Intervarsity Press. pp. 82–102.
- — (1989). Life on the Road: The Gospel Basis for a Messianic Lifestyle. Homebush: Lancer.
- — (1990). The Fringes of Freedom: Following Jesus, Living Hope, Working for Justice. Homebush: ANZEA Publishers.
- — (1990). "Human Rights: A Down-Under Perspective". In Brackney, W.H.; Burke, R. (eds.). Faith, Life and Witness: The Papers of the Research and Study Division of the World Baptist Alliance (1886-1990). Birmingham: Samford University. pp. 243–257.
- — (2007) [1990]. "Good news to the poor: poverty and the poor in the Bible". In Pidwell, H. (ed.). A Gentle Bunyip: The Athol Gill Story. West Lakes: Seaview Press. pp. 180–272.
