= Enright Ridge Urban Ecovillage =

The Enright Ridge Urban Eco-village, Inc. (ERUEV) is a registered 501(c)(3) nonprofit organization located in the East Price Hill neighborhood of Cincinnati, Ohio.

== About ==
ERUEV was founded in 2004 by 19 residents who came together to establish "a community for people who are working to live more sustainably and with more awareness of the earth, whether it's planting gardens, rehabbing houses, or hosting community dinners.

In 2019, the organization changed its name to the Hilltop Eco Community.

The organization is part of the Foundation for Intentional Community.

The village promotes sustainable living by minimizing fossil fuel use, avoiding pesticides, and prioritizing organic and regenerative agriculture. Residents reduce deforestation by using reclaimed or sustainably sourced lumber and conserve energy through efficient design and technology. Water conservation efforts include rainwater collection for non-potable use, while composting organic waste enriches soil and reduces landfill impact. The community emphasizes mindful consumption, choosing durable products, minimizing packaging, and prioritizing reuse and recycling. Disposable items are discouraged in favor of reusable alternatives, fostering an environmentally responsible lifestyle.

== Publications ==
- Creating an Urban Ecovillage: A Model for Revitalizing Our Cities (2024)
