= Religious intentional community =

Community (group of people) who practice the same religion

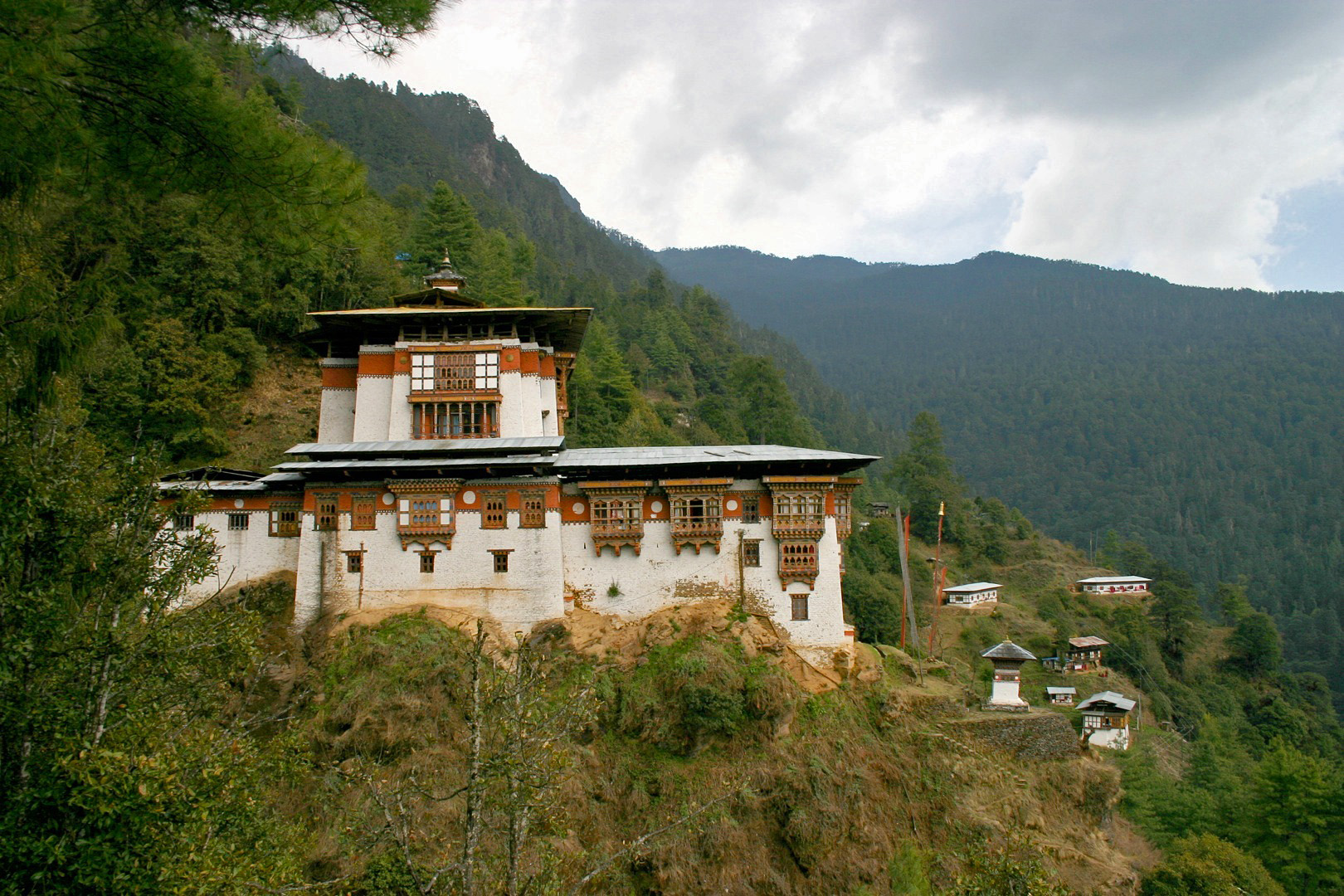
Tango Monastery, Bhutan

A religious intentional community is a residential community with a shared religious identity designed to have a high degree of group cohesiveness and teamwork. A religious community is a group of people of the same religion living together specifically for religious purposes, often subject to formal commitments such as religious vows, as in a convent or a monastery. Many religious communities are part of the way religions are organized, and most religions have some form of religious order.

== Christianity ==
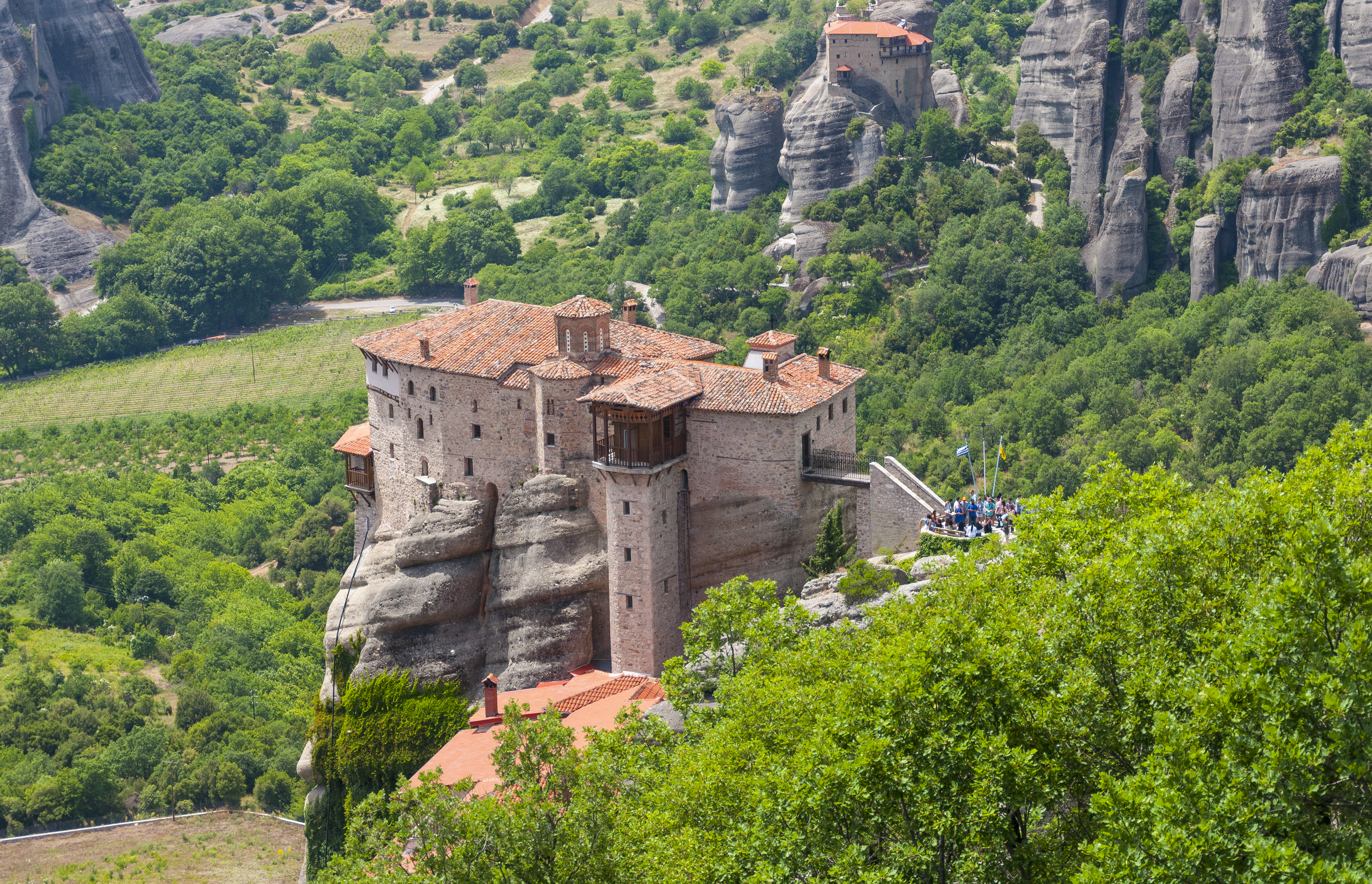
The Monastery of Rousanou located on Meteora

Christianity has had a variety of religious groups dating back to the early church. Christian monasticism began in the Eastern churches, and eventually moved to the west.

=== Catholicism ===
==== Religious Order ====
In the Catholic Church, a religious order is a community of consecrated life that is also an Institute. Their members that take solemn vows. In the church, they are a type of religious institute. Under the broad category of religious order are canons regular and monasteries, mendicants and clerics regular.

==== Religious Congregation ====
A Congregation is a type of department of the Roman Curia, ranking below the two Secretariats, and above the pontifical councils, pontifical commissions, tribunals and offices.

==== Monasteries and convents ====
In the Western church, the concept of monasticism was patterned after the Eastern church. Monasteries and convents became an important part of European life.

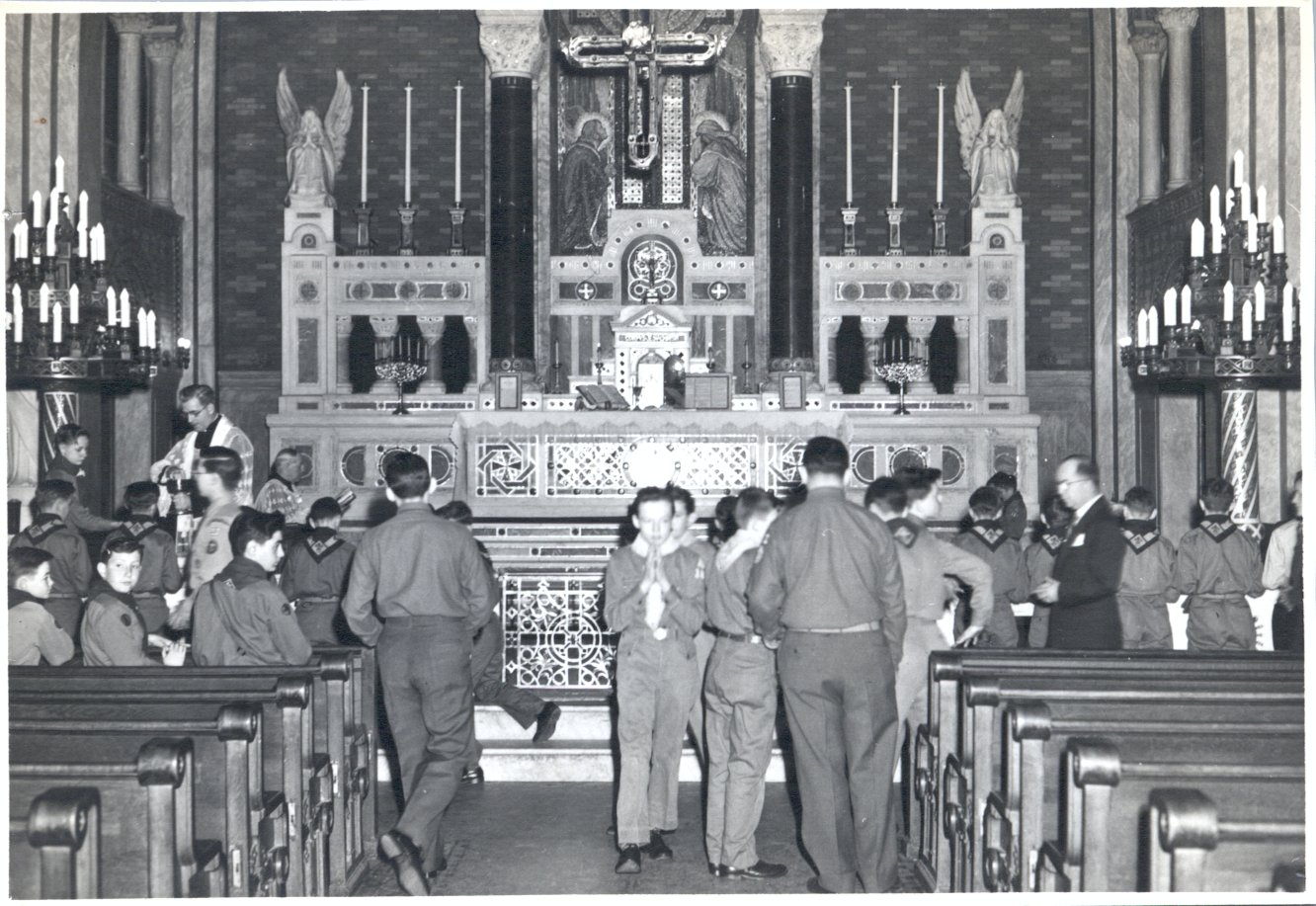
Parish of St. Francis de Sales Roman Church

==== Parish ====
A parish is a religious community within a particular church, led by a parish priest, under the authority of the diocesan bishop. It is the lowest ecclesiastical subdivision in the Catholic episcopal polity, and the primary constituent unit of a diocese or eparchy. In the 1983 Code of Canon Law, parishes are constituted under cc. 515–552, entitled "Parishes, Pastors, and Parochial Vicars."

=== Eastern Orthodoxy ===
Christian monasticism began in the Eastern Mediterranean in Syria, Palestine and Egypt. In the Eastern Orthodox Church, Oriental Orthodoxy, the Church of the East and Eastern Catholicism, monastic communities of monks and nuns followed the Rule of St Basil.

=== Intentional communities ===
While not Christian in nature, an intentional community is a voluntary residential community designed to have a high degree of social cohesion. There are many secular communities, but monasteries, kibbutzim and ashrams are the religious versions.

Lay religious communities are Christian examples of intentional communities. They include groups such as the Hutterites, Bruderhof Communities, Amish and some Mennonite churches, and the Shaker communities.

== Buddhist monasteries ==
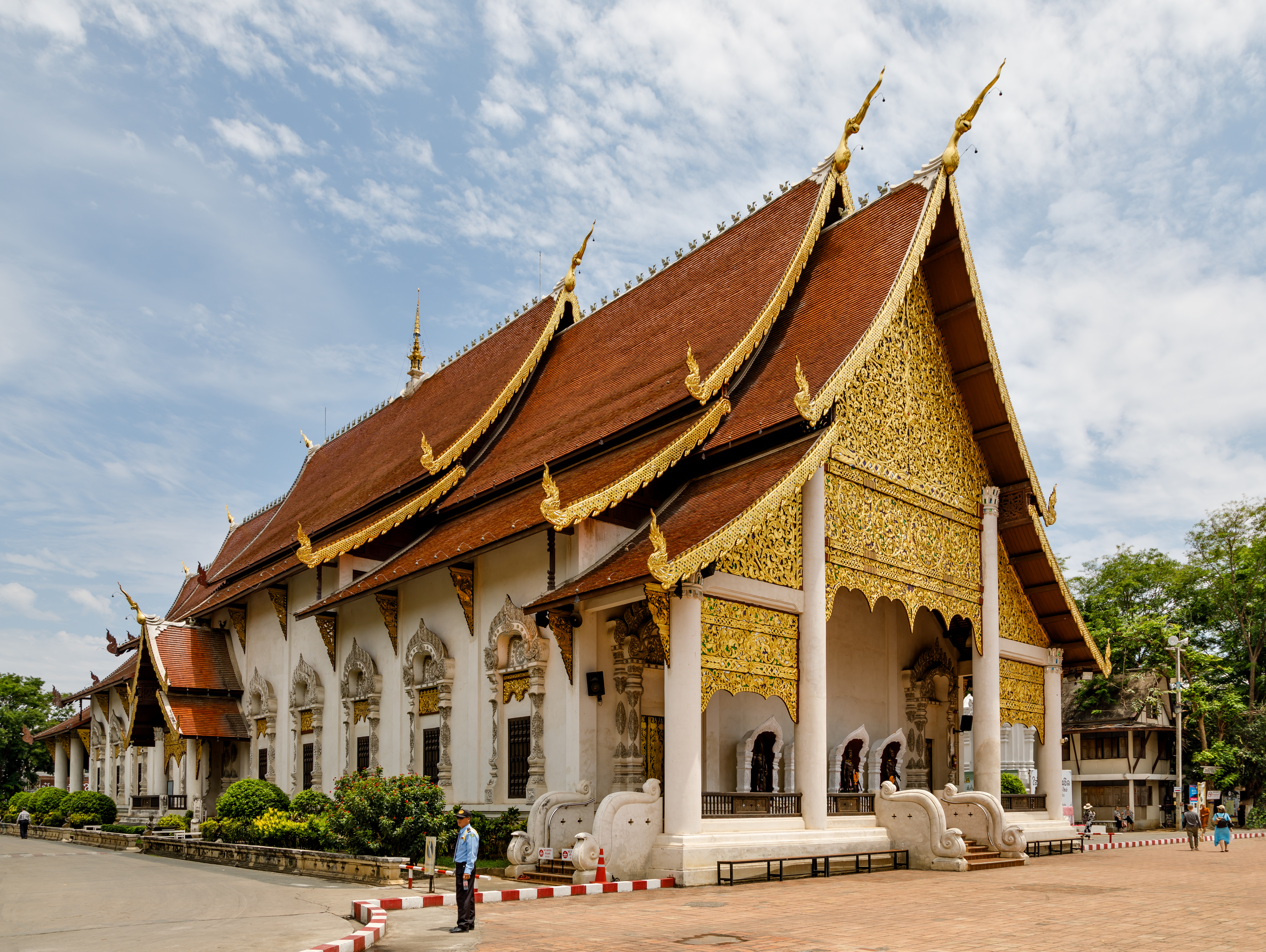
Vihara, locally called wihan, of Wat Chedi Luang in Northern Thailand

In Buddhism, the Buddhist monastery (Vihāra) is a place for Buddhist monks and nuns (bhikkhu). In early Sanskrit and Pali texts, Vihāra meant any arrangement of dwellings for the bhikkhu. Over time, the concept evolved into an architectural style for living quarters for monks with an open shared space or courtyard.

== Hinduism ==
An ashram (Sanskrit: आश्रम, āśrama) is a spiritual hermitage or a monastery in Indian religions. Traditionally, an ashram would be located far from human habitation, among natural surroundings conducive to spiritual instruction and meditation.

== Islam ==
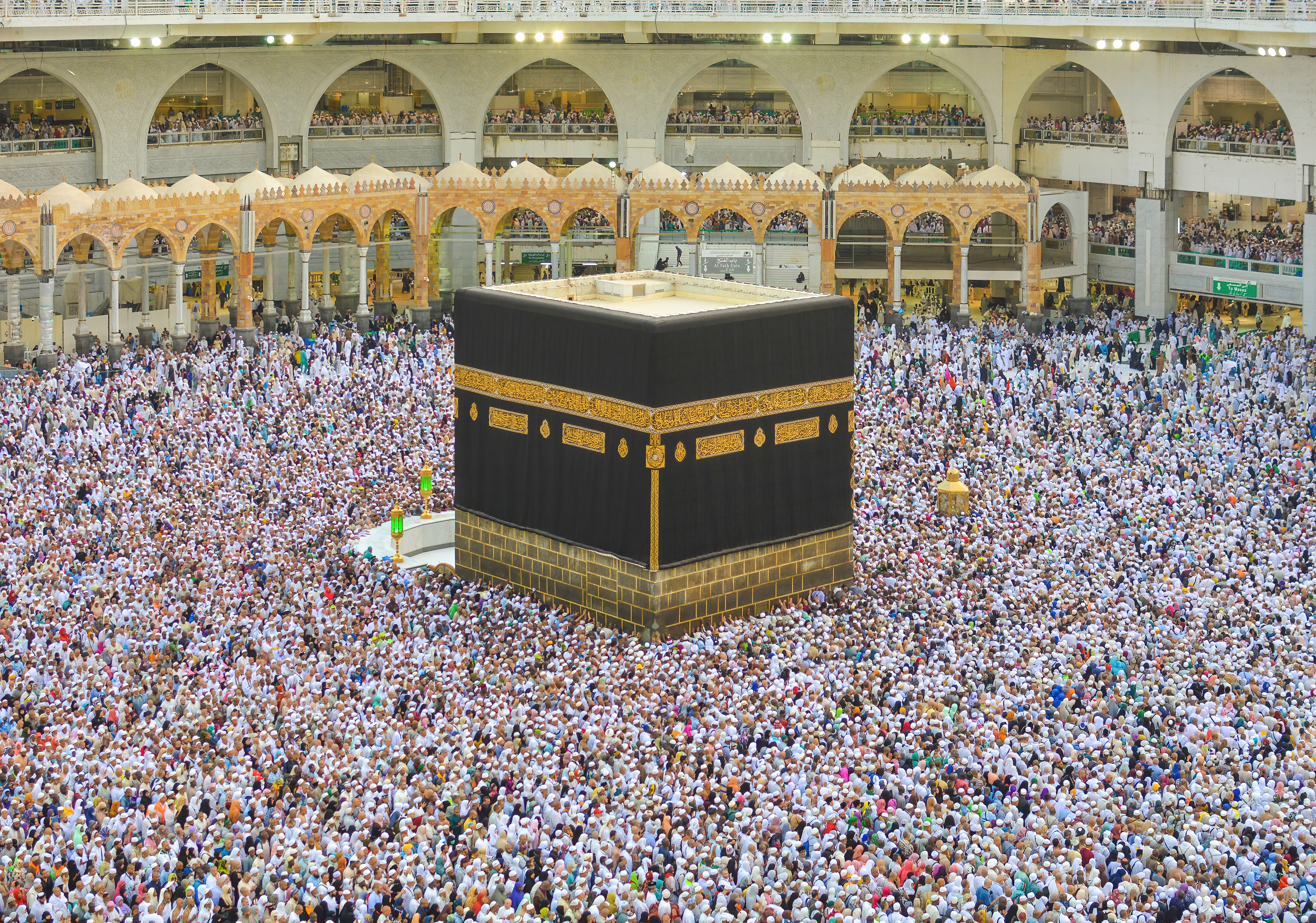
The Kaaba during Hajj

In Islam, Ummah (Arabic: أمة [ˈʊmːæ]) is an Arabic word meaning "community", but is different from shaʻb (شعب [ʃæʕb]), which means a nation with common ancestry or geography. It is a synonym for ummat al-Islām (أمة الإسلام, 'the Islamic community'); and is commonly used to mean the collective community of Islamic people.

The Quran typically refers to the ummah as a single group that shares common religious beliefs, specifically those that are the objects of a divine plan of salvation.

Islam generally forbids monasticism; isolation from worldly affairs is broadly seen as less virtuous than participation in the Ummah. However, various forms of intentional communities do exist, frequently tied to charitable institutions established for public good. Some examples include Sufi institutions, including khanqahs, zawiyahs, or türbes, many of which are involved with waqfs for education and scholarship, medical care, bathing and hygiene, public gardens and orchards, caravanserais, the maintenance of water supply, irrigation, and public sanitation systems, and other public services, which may also be part of a larger mosque complex. Some Sufi lodges serve military purposes, such as the ribats and ksars associated with North African marabouts and mourides.

However, while all Sufi orders are intentional communities and emphasise spiritual retreat to a certain degree, some Sufi orders especially emphasise asceticism and isolation. Among mainstream Sunni orders, the Khalwati Order in particular emphasises personal asceticism (zuhd), as well as periods of spiritual retreat (khalwa) in an intentional community, to cultivate one's spiritual growth. The Mevlevi order is another Sunni Sufi brotherhood which particularly emphasises khalwa.

== See also ==
- Koinonia, group cohesiveness among Christians
- Religious congregation
- Religious organization
- Ghetto
