= Laurent Fabre (priest) =

- Priest
- Church: Catholic
- Installed: 1973
- Term ended: 2016
- Successor: François Michon

Personal details
- Born: 9 August 1940 (age 86) Marseille

Laurent Fabre (born 9 August 1940 in Marseille) is a French Catholic priest. He entered the Society of Jesus in 1961 and pursued his studies there before encountering the Catholic Charismatic Renewal. Having experienced Baptism in the Holy Spirit in 1971, he was the principal founder of the Chemin Neuf Community, established in 1973.

== Biography ==
Born in 1940, Laurent Fabre entered the seminary of the Society of Jesus in 1958, and, while undertaking his theological training in Lyon, encountered the Catholic Charismatic Renewal in 1971 through an American Jesuit student, Mike Cawdrey. During a prayer weekend in 1972, he experienced Baptism in the Holy Spirit. This experience led to the formation of a prayer group at Montée du Chemin-Neuf, on the hill of Fourvière.

In the summer of 1972, Laurent Fabre, accompanied by another French Jesuit, Bertrand Lepesant, who would later found the Puits de Jacob Community, travelled to the United States to meet American charismatics. In September 1973, following a gathering attended by around sixty people, seven of them, including Fabre, chose to live in community. Thus the Chemin Neuf Community was born.

From 1973 onwards, while being involved in the Chemin Neuf Community, Fabre remained by right a member of the Society of Jesus. In 1994, two years after the foundation of the Chemin Neuf Institute, he left the Jesuits.

In 1995, the first chapter of the community re-elected him as its leader for a seven-year term, with 97% of the vote. Subsequent chapters, in 2002 and 2009, likewise saw his re-election. At the same time, in October 2008 the chapter of the Chemin Neuf Institute (priests and religious) re-elected him as superior of the institute.

In March 2016, the archbishop of Canterbury and Anglican primate Justin Welby awarded him a Lambeth degree in the category of "Prayer and Religious Life".

He relinquished his responsibilities as head of the Chemin Neuf Community at the August 2016 chapter. Father François Michon was elected to succeed him.

== See also ==
- Chemin Neuf Community
- Society of Jesus

== Notes and references ==
=== Bibliography ===
- Hébrard, Monique (1987). Les nouveaux disciples dix ans après [The New Disciples Ten Years Later]. Paris: Éditions du Centurion. OCLC 18057917.
