= World Youth Day 2000 =

International Catholic youth event

Coordinates: 41°51′09″N 12°38′10″E

XV World Youth Day
- Date: 15–20 August 2000
- Location: Rome, Italy
- Type: Youth festival
- Theme: "The word was made flesh, and dwelt amongst us" (John 1:14)
- Organised by: Catholic Church
- Participants: Pope John Paul II
- Previous: 1997 Paris
- Next: 2002 Toronto
- Website: Official site

World Youth Day 2000 (Italian: Giornata mondiale della gioventù 2000) was a Catholic youth festival held from 15–20 August 2000 in Rome, Italy. About two million young people attended the event, with 157 countries represented.

== Theme ==
Pope John Paul II chose as the motto of this World Youth Day "The word was made flesh, and dwelt amongst us" (John 1:14).

== Anthem ==
The Official hymn "Emmanuel", sung in Italian, Spanish, English and French, was composed by Marco Mammoli, Marco Brusati, Mauro Labellarte and Massimo Versaci and arranged by Valter Vincenti. It was performed by Giuseppe Barbera.

== Logo ==
The logo summarizes the three fundamental elements of the World Youth Day: the place, the protagonists and the meeting. The city of Rome is represented by the dome of St. Peter's Basilica and the arms of the Bernini colonnade. The image of the dome recalls the reality of the Church and the pontiff. The meeting between the Church and the world takes place through an "embrace", which represents the Church that welcomes the young Catholics of Rome. For the colors, three flat colors of the same gradation werde chosen: yellow, orange and red. Yellow and red are the colors of the city of Rome, while the orange symbolizes the meeting as it is a mix between these two colors.

== Events ==
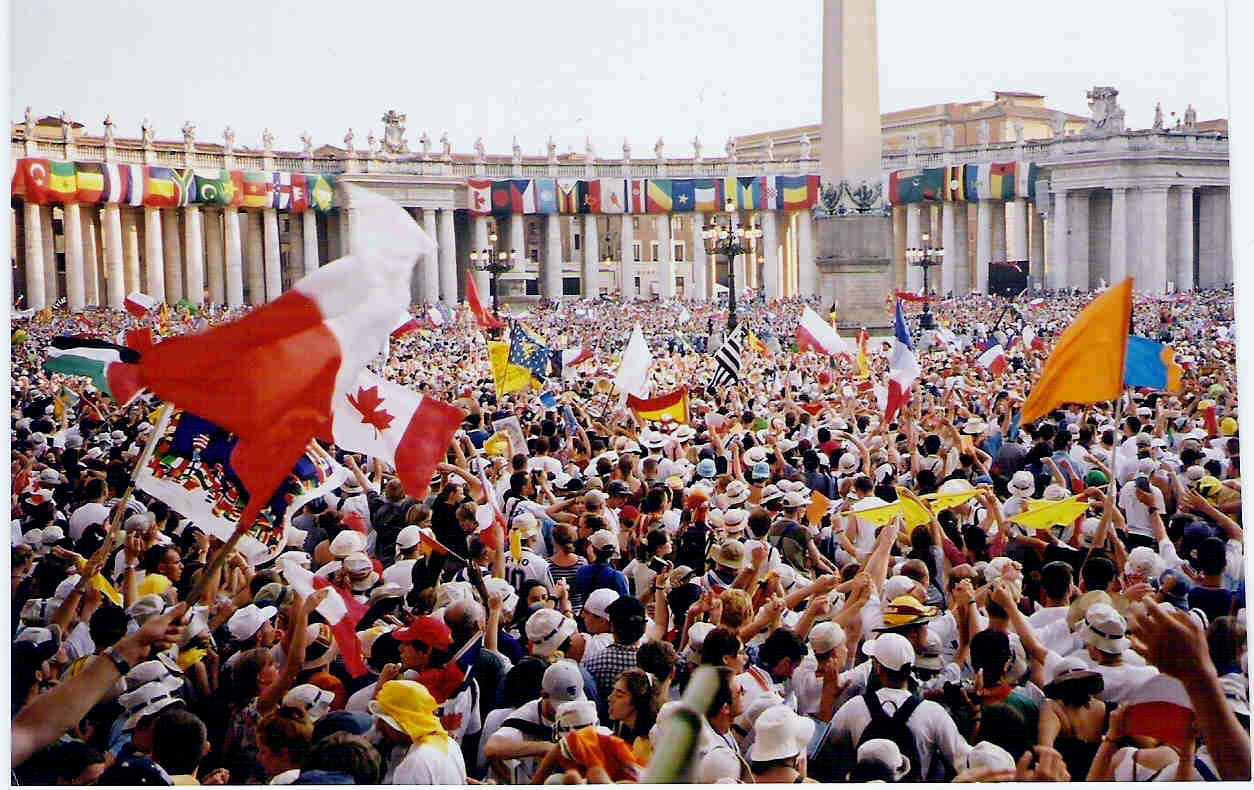
World Youth Day 2000

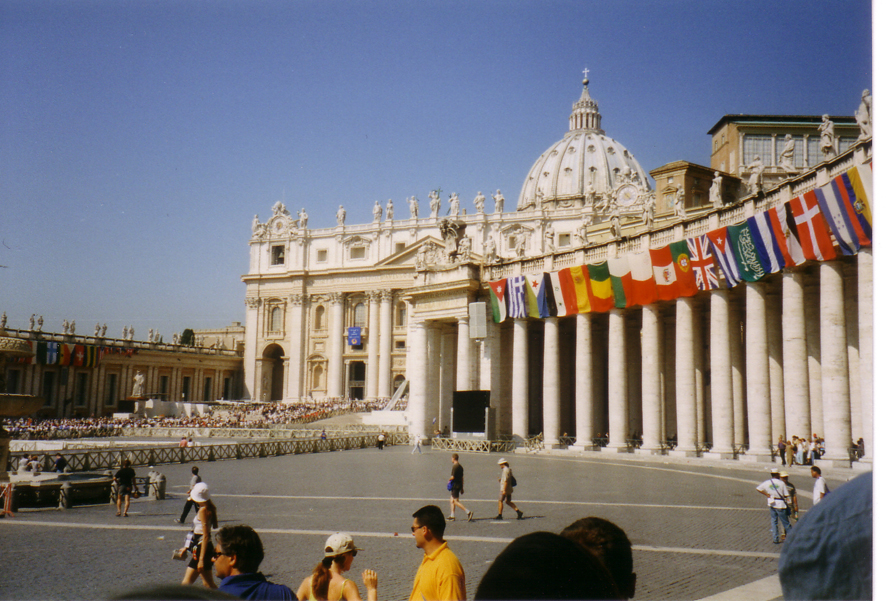
World Youth Day in St. Peter's Square

The international level celebration of World Youth Day in 2000 was meant to coincide with the Jubilee Year proclaimed by Pope John Paul II, to celebrate 2000 years since the birth of Jesus Christ. This is also reflected in the theme for the celebrations.

- The Pope greeted the pilgrims in St. Peter's Square before the WYDs, "Days in the Dioceses" were held, which for the first time included volunteer experiences.
- The first day began in the afternoon with the opening mass in Archbasilica of St. John Lateran presided by the Pope reserved for young Romans and Italians. Subsequently, the Pope moved to St. Peter's Square in which there was a celebration of welcome reserved for young foreigners.
- The second day began the three days of morning catechesis for the participants, held in some churches in Rome and neighboring dioceses divided by linguistic groups held by cardinals and bishops from all over the world. From this day it was possible for the young participants take the Jubilee Pilgrimage crossing the Holy Door of St. Peter's Basilica.
- The third day, the program of the previous day was repeated.
- The fourth day, the program of the previous day was repeated. In the evening there was a Via Crucis with the cross of the Holy Year presided by Camillo Ruini from the Basilica of Santa Maria in Ara Coeli at the Colosseum.
- The fifth day, at noon all the church bells of Rome played at the Angelus prayer party. The young people went to the Tor Vergata area, reached in the evening by the pope who presided the vigil. John Paul II called the young people "sentinels in the morning" ("sentinelle del mattino") and invited them not to resign themselves to the injustices of the world. The pope asked all participants to defend peace, to make the world more and more habitable and to say their "yes" to Christ as the center of their ideal and realization of happiness.
- The sixth and last day, in the morning the Eucharistic celebration was held in the University of Rome Tor Vergata, followed by the recital of the Angelus prayer. After that, Pope announced that the 2002 WYD would be held in Toronto.
