= New Oasis for Life Commune =

Community in Yunnan, China

Lifechanyuan International Family Society
- Formation: 2009
- Type: Community Living, Commune, Taoism
- Key people: Xuefeng (founder)
- Website: www.smcyinternationalfamily.org

New Oasis for Life Commune (Chinese: 生命禅院; pinyin: Shēngmìng chányuàn ; lit. 'Life Zen Temple'), also called Lifechanyuan was a community founded in April 2009 by Xuefeng in Yunnan province, China. From 2009 to 2016, it was also called "the Second Home".

Between 2016 and 2021 the organization was forcibly disbanded by the Chinese government, which has since declared the group an illegal organization. Xuefeng moved to Canada and set up a new community.

== History ==
Xuefeng was born Zhang Zifan in 1957 the son of a local cadre in Lianhua Township, Gansu Province. They later moved to Hetan in Gansu. In 1995 he was sent to Zimbabwe by the Gansu Geology and Mineral Resources Bureau. After living and doing business there for some years, he claimed to have a near-death experience in which he was reborn with the same spirit that had run through other key figures in world religion. He took the name Xuefeng and started Lifechanyuan in 2005.

In 2009 Xuefeng set up a commune in China's southwestern Yunnan Province, a "rural communal utopia". The commune claimed to have about 150 members, to share property in common, and to reject marriage. The commune was blockaded by police in 2014 and eventually broken up. Further raids occurred in Guizhou in 2021. As of July 2021 Lifechanyuan is classed as an illegal organization in China.

Xuefeng moved to Canada, and those who could not follow him may be in hiding in China. There are also followers in Thailand. In 2017 the organization claimed to be building a new community in Canada. As of 2024 the organization claims to invite new members who are "under 58 years old, and wish to become immortal." According to Chinese sources, the organization had about 2,000 members in 2021, of which about 100 were active.

== Doctrine ==
Lifechanyuan claims to integrate thought from Christianity, Catholicism, Islam, Buddhism, Taoism, and other sources.
