= Lemurian Fellowship =

School of universal philosophy

The Lemurian Fellowship is a school of universal philosophy located on 60 acres (24 ha) of land near Ramona, California. The Fellowship provides instruction on what is referred to as the Lemurian Philosophy, which includes concepts of cosmic or universal law and various principles associated with the application of these laws. Teachings range from reincarnation and karma, to balanced living, to Christ's ministry and message. Students of the Fellowship progress through a correspondence course that consists of a series of 12 basic lessons that can be followed by an advanced training leading to acceptance into the Lemurian Order. Order members continue to work on personal development as well as contribute to group activities, one key activity being the making of various hand-made crafts, a number of which have been recognized for their contribution to 20th century modern design.

== Founding ==
The Lemurian Fellowship was founded in Chicago in 1936 by Robert D. Stelle, a teacher, author, and physician, and Howard Zitko, his associate. After moving briefly to Milwaukee, Wisconsin, and then Chula Vista, California, the Fellowship relocated near Ramona, California, to get away from the pressures and distractions of the city, but also have the advantages of being near a major city, San Diego. The Fellowship is registered as a nonprofit, non-stock, religious corporation under California law, and is overseen administratively by a board of governors.

== Philosophy, teachings, and beliefs ==
According to the Fellowship, the Lemurian Philosophy was revealed to Stelle by highly advanced men and women, called Masters or Elder Brothers. The Philosophy is said to have formed the foundation of the so-called Mukulian civilization on the legendary continent of Mu (also known as Lemuria) now covered by the Pacific Ocean. This lost continent is considered incompatible with the theory of plate tectonics, the standard theory describing movement of the Earth's lithosphere accepted by most, but not all, Earth scientists. Nonetheless, the Lemurian Philosophy points to various megalithic structures and other features on various Pacific Islands, and in South America and Asia, as indications that the continent and an advanced civilization did at one time exist.

The Fellowship teaches that, as a result of following universal law as individuals and as a nation, a peaceful and prosperous civilization was built on Mu, reaching great heights culturally and materially. However, corrupting, destructive elements eventually began to grow and significantly impact the society, with the result that the civilization declined and the continent itself eventually submerged. When sufficient numbers of people are again educated and trained to live by universal laws, such as those taught by Christ, it is believed that a new, advanced human society will be built. It is believed this will take many generations, but will recreate and then surpass what existed on the continent of Mu.

The Lemurian Philosophy combines elements characteristic of eastern and western religious traditions. For example, teachings include the doctrines of reincarnation and karma as well as Christ's precepts in the gospels of the Christian Bible. The spirit, or real identity of an individual is referred to as the Ego. The inherent potential of Egos is considered vast and through discovering the universal laws that govern existence, and then learning to cooperate with and use them, one can eventually master human life and so control one's environment and destiny. This is described as a gradual process, requiring many incarnations to gain the knowledge and wisdom needed. Egos are meant to move toward perfection, and toward God.

From the Fellowship's perspective, all religions are considered to have their value, and the Lemurian teachings do not seek to change what is good in any religion, or to proselytize. Rather, teachings and training are offered to people who are interested in the Philosophy and are willing to work with their problems. Students are neither expected nor required to abandon any religion they may be following or beliefs they may hold.

Within the broader context of the Philosophy's beliefs regarding the purpose of human life, and the organization and operation of the universe, the Fellowship describes the principles it teaches to its students as practical in nature, with the emphasis on applying them to solve problems of everyday living.

One principle is that of living balanced lives, and particularly to acquire balanced growth within oneself in three areas: spiritual, material or physical, and mental. To assist towards achieving balanced growth, students work to build their character through developing twelve primary virtues: precision, efficiency, forbearance, patience, discrimination, kindliness, tolerance, devotion, sincerity, courage, charity, humility.

The importance of balance is considered to hold not only for the development of individuals, but for groups of individuals and nations as well. For example, one of the principles said to have guided the Mukulian government was:

No organized society can hope to prosper permanently except as each member thereof prospers, and no individual member can hope to prosper permanently except as the group or society as a whole prospers.

== Student training ==
Training of students in the Lemurian Philosophy is through a correspondence course, either through regular mail or online. The basic instruction consists of 12 lessons, each being sent to a student based on successful completion of the one prior.

Lessons cover topics such as the laws of action and reaction, precipitation, compensation, and transmutation. The law of action and reaction includes Isaac Newton's definition of it, accepted by most, but not all, physicists, but also what is commonly referred to as the Golden Rule. Precipitation is used for bringing desired and important things into one's life. The law of compensation influences economic security and is said to have a spiritual foundation. An example of following the law of transmutation would be finding the good in a situation by changing one's viewpoint.

Other topics covered are health, marriage and family relationships, helping others, the mind, the twelve virtues, the Bible, transition (bodily death), and reincarnation (rebirth as humans). The training takes a learn-by-doing approach, and students answer a questionnaire after each lesson to determine their understanding and use of the concepts presented. If a student completes the 12 basic lessons satisfactorily, he or she may be offered what is called the Advanced Training.

== Lemurian Order ==
Upon completing the Advanced Training, qualified students may join the Lemurian Order. Order members take part in activities that further the goals of the Lemurian Philosophy and program. Order headquarters is located on a 200-acre property called "The Gateway," also near Ramona, California, but separate from Fellowship headquarters. Some Order members live at or near Gateway. However, Order members are not required to relocate there, but can participate in Order activities to whatever extent they can, from wherever they live.

One ongoing group activity of the Order is the Lemurian Crafts, where hand-made products have been designed and fashioned ranging from wooden beakers, to lamps, to door and cabinet hardware, to violins and music stands. Emphasis is on making useful and beautiful products. One item, a wooden beaker, is part of the permanent collection of the Museum of Modern Art in New York City. A key function of the Crafts endeavor is to provide an opportunity for Order members to demonstrate the effectiveness of the Lemurian teachings while working together.

The Fellowship is supported primarily by student tuition, tithes, gifts, and sales of crafts items.
