= Communities (magazine) =

Quarterly magazine about intentional communities in North America (started 1972)

Communities Life in Cooperative Culture
- Frequency: Quarterly
- Founded: 1972
- Company: Global Ecovillage Network - United States
- Country: United States
- Language: English
- Website: www.gen-us.net/communities/
- ISSN: 0199-9346

Communities: Life in Cooperative Culture is a quarterly magazine published by the Global Ecovillage Network - United States. It is a primary resource for information, issues, and ideas about intentional communities in North America. Articles and columns cover practical "how-to" issues of community living as well as personal stories about forming new communities, decision-making, conflict resolution, raising children in community, and sustainability.

== History and profile ==
The magazine was started in 1972, first under the name Communitas and then as Communities. A variety of editing and publishing collectives, based in several different intentional communities, managed the magazine through its next 78 issues. Paul Freundlich, an early editor and member of the Communities publishing co-operative, went on found Co-op America (now Green America) in 1982, and now maintains the Exemplars Library, and has continued to contribute to and reference Communities over the years. At the end of 1990, financial difficulties led to a hiatus in publication. The Fellowship for Intentional Community, based in Rutledge, Missouri, became publisher and resumed publication of Communities two years later. The magazine then returned to a consistent quarterly schedule. Its editor during 1993-2007 was Diana Leafe Christian. Diana too has continued her involvement with the magazine since departing as editor, citing it in her own workshops, books, and articles and contributing many articles herself. Following two issues produced by interim editor Alyson Ewald, Chris Roth then became editor in 2008, and Yulia Zarubina became art director in early 2009.

In 2011 the Communal Studies Association awarded Communities its Donald E. Pitzer Distinguished Service Award for the magazine's service to the communities movement and to the field of communal studies. Donald Pitzer wrote, "Since its inception, Communities has been the most consistent and informative networking organ for the modern communitarian movement. You and all who have edited and contributed to its incisive content can be rightly proud. I congratulate...all who have faithfully held Communities up as the standard voice in this most important field of human endeavor. You have treated truthfully and critically subjects of vital importance to the very survival of social life and civilized society. In many ways the world has already taken notice and begun to apply the trail of communal evidence you reveal in every issue." A variety of print and online journals have republished articles from Communities, including publications by the Communal Studies Association, the International Communal Studies Association, Lilipoh, CobWeb, a variety of websites, and Utne Reader.

After the Fall 2019 issue FIC discontinued publication and, following a successful fundraising campaign, the magazine transferred to a new nonprofit publisher, Global Ecovillage Network–United States (GEN-US). Additional staff members include Joyce Bressler (ad manager), Linda Joseph (GEN-US administrator), and Kim Scheidt (bookkeeper). Seven people serve on the Editorial Review Board.

Articles are written by a wide range of communitarians and people interested in community and/or cooperation, and submissions are welcome from anyone inspired to write. Each quarterly issue focuses on a specific theme.

In 2014 the magazine started publishing in digital as well as print form; subscriptions are now available in print-plus-digital or digital-only format. All back issues have been scanned into digital form and are available to all current subscribers. The website also features selected back-issue articles and a complete index of articles published in Communitas and Communities since 1972.

== See also ==
- Cohousing
- Communities Directory
- Fellowship for Intentional Community
- Global Ecovillage Network
- Green America
