= Native currant =

Native currant is an Australian name for certain plants, which have smallish currant-like fruit:

- Carissa spinarum of the dogbane family (Apocynaceae)
- Coprosma quadrifida of the coffee family (Rubiaceae)
- Leucopogon parviflorus of the heather family (Ericaceae)
