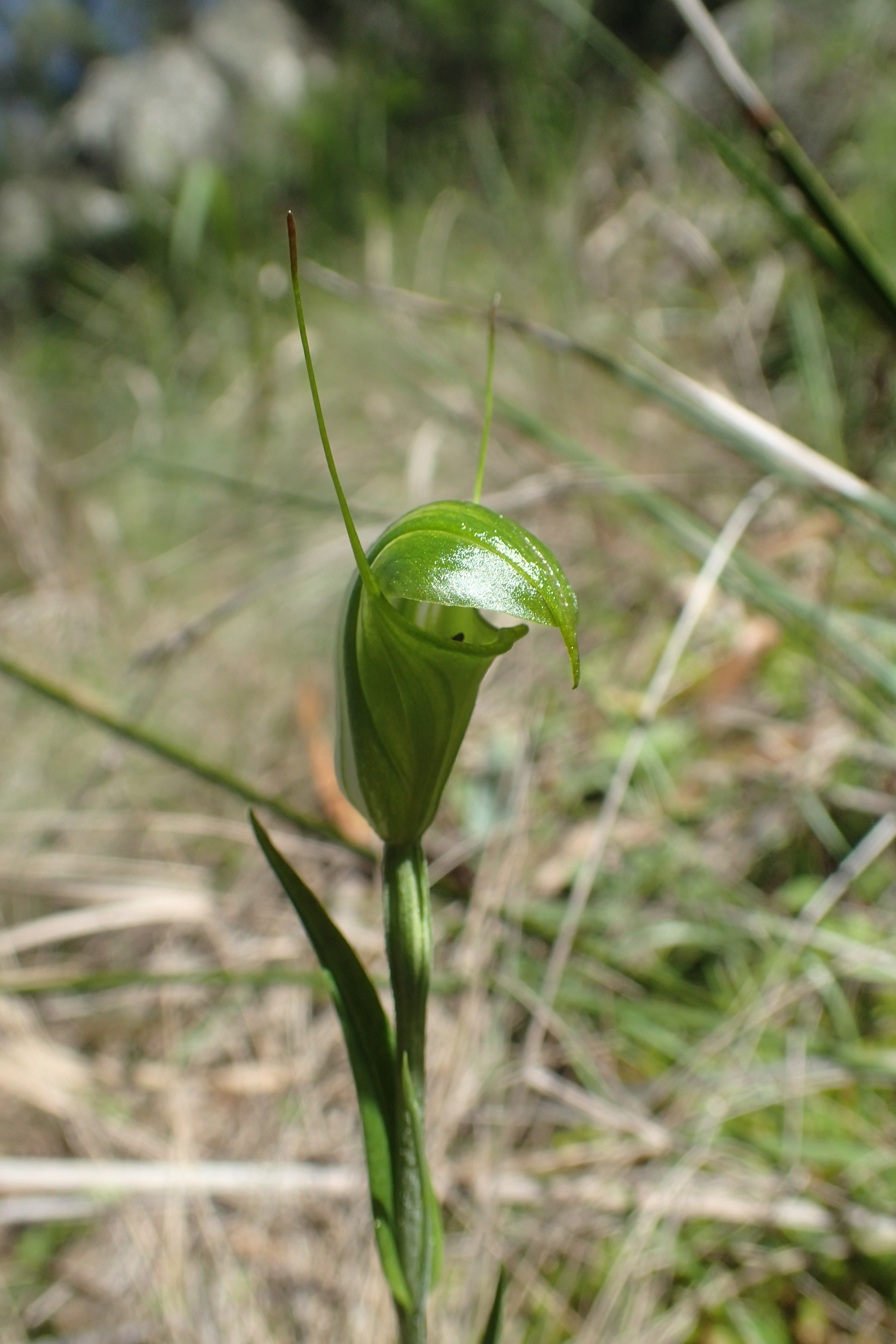
- Pterostylis obtusa growing near Gara Gorge

Scientific classification
- Kingdom: Plantae
- Clade: Tracheophytes
- Clade: Angiosperms
- Clade: Monocots
- Order: Asparagales
- Family: Orchidaceae
- Subfamily: Orchidoideae
- Tribe: Cranichideae
- Genus: Pterostylis
- Species: P. obtusa

Binomial name
- Pterostylis obtusa R.Br.

Synonyms
- Diplodium obtusum (R.Br.) D.L.Jones & M.A.Clem.

= Pterostylis obtusa =

Blunt-tongue greenhood

Species of orchid

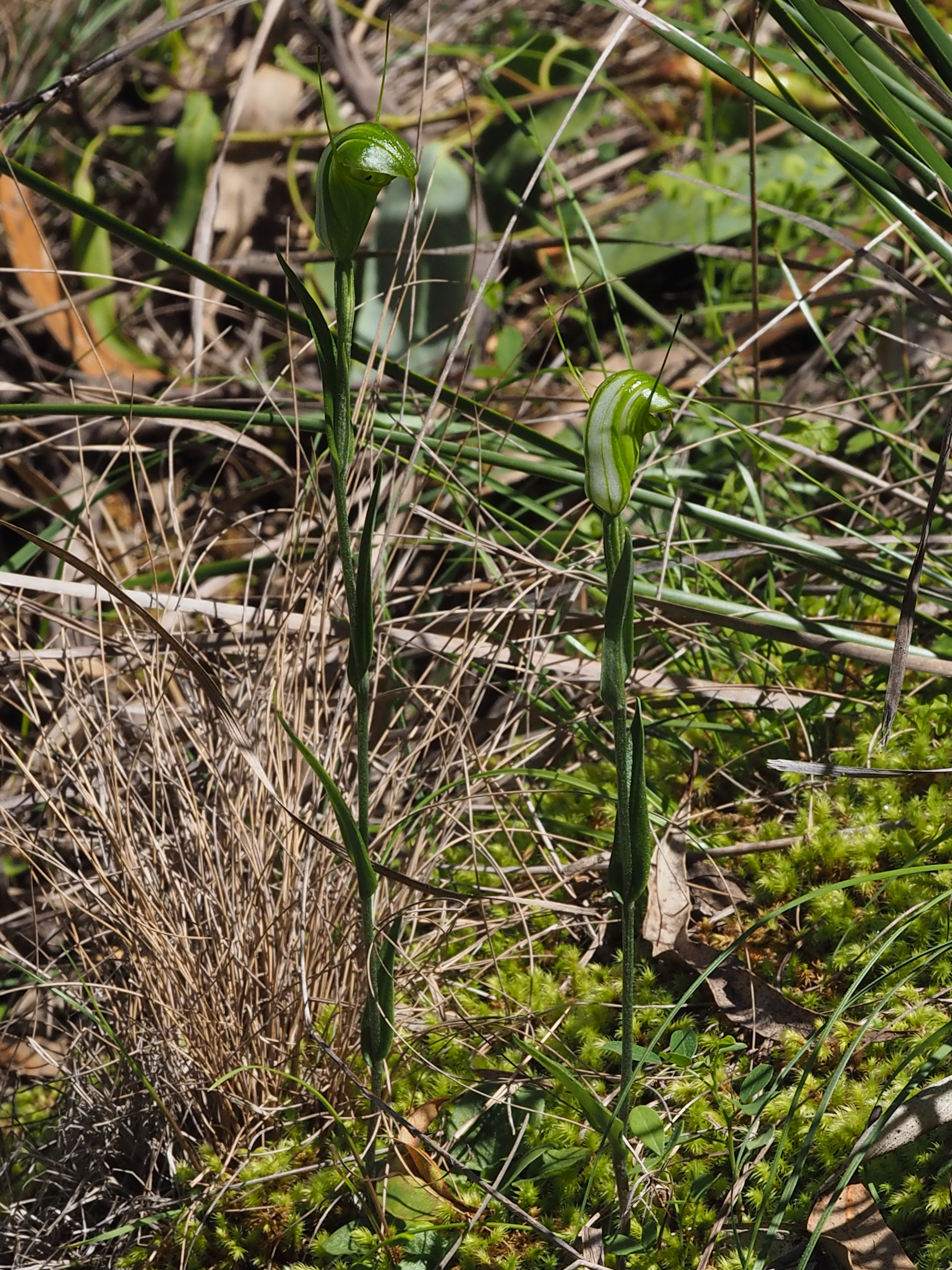
Habit

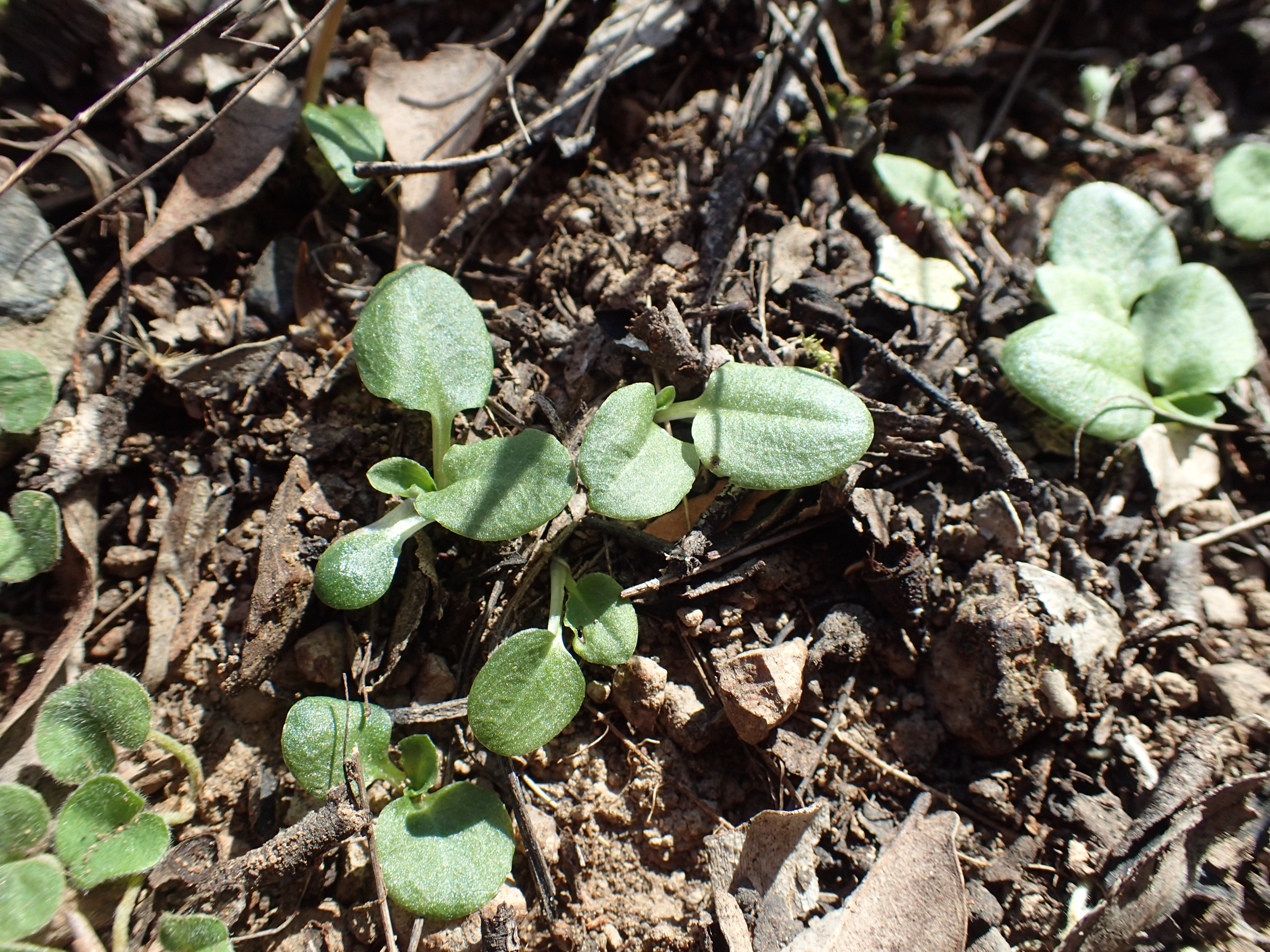
Rosette leaves

Pterostylis obtusa, commonly known as the blunt-tongue greenhood, is a species of orchid endemic to New South Wales. It is distinguished from similar greenhood orchids by its thick, flat, platform-like sinus and blunt labellum which is only just visible above the sinus.

== Description ==
Pterostylis obtusa has a rosette of between three and six dark green, egg-shaped, crinkled leaves, each leaf 12–25 mm (0.5–1 in) long and 10–15 mm (0.4–0.6 in) wide. A single shiny, bright green and white flower is borne on a flowering spike 150–250 mm (6–10 in) high. There are between three and five stem leaves on the flowering spike. The flowers are 20–28 mm (0.8–1 in) long and 10–12 mm (0.4–0.5 in) wide. The dorsal sepal curves forward in its upper half and has a thread-like tip about 4 mm (0.2 in) long. The edges of the petals are flared and the sinus is flat and platform-like with a rolled edge. The lateral sepals have thread-like tips 20–26 mm (0.8–1 in) long. The labellum is 9–11 mm (0.35–0.43 in) long, 3 mm (0.1 in) wide, green, blunt and is just visible above the sinus. Flowering occurs from February to June.

== Taxonomy and naming ==
Pterostylis obtusa was first described in 1810 by Robert Brown and the description was published in Prodromus Florae Novae Hollandiae et Insulae Van Diemen. The specific epithet (obtusa) is a Latin word meaning "blunt" or "dull".

== Distribution and habitat ==
The blunt-tongue greenhood grows among grass in moist places on the ranges and tablelands of New South Wales and on Lord Howe Island. Specimens from Tasmania are Pterostylis atrans.
