= Diana Leafe Christian =

- Scientific career
- Fields: Permaculture

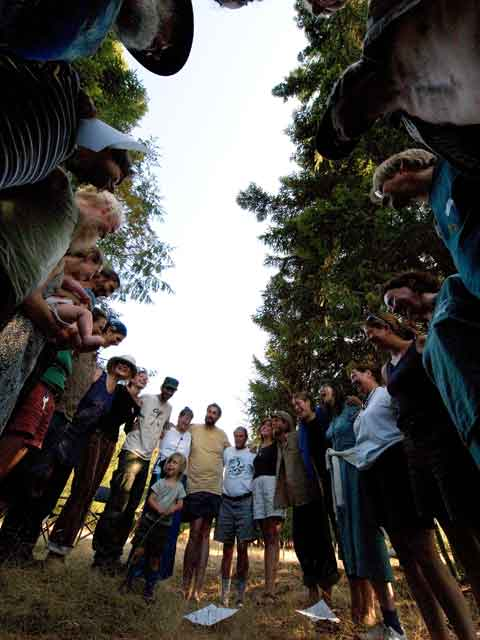
Participants in a 2006 workshop led by Christian at O.U.R. Ecovillage, British Columbia

Diana Leafe Christian is an author, former editor of Communities magazine, and nationwide speaker and workshop presenter on starting new ecovillages, on sustainability, on building communities, and on governance by sociocracy. She lives in an off-grid homestead at Earthaven Ecovillage in the Blue Ridge Mountains of North Carolina, U.S. She has said that living in an intentional community "is the longest, most expensive, personal growth workshop you will ever take," though others are also associated with this quotation and it's unclear who originated it.

== Biography ==
Christian grew up in Los Angeles. She learned to write at what she calls a "real-life school of writing".

== Published works ==
Christian is the author of two books designed to help people who want to join or start their own ecovillages or other intentional communities. In Creating a Life Together: Practical Tools to Grow Ecovillages and Intentional Communities, she uses success stories, cautionary tales, and step-by-step advice to cover typical time-frames and costs; the role of founders; getting started as a group; vision documents; power, governance, and decision-making; legal structures; finding and financing land; zoning issues; sustainable site plans; selecting new members; and good process and communication skills for dealing well with conflict.

In Finding Community: How to Join an Ecovillage or Intentional Community, she covers researching, visiting, evaluating, and joining communities.

During the 1970s and 80s Christian wrote articles for New Age magazine, Yoga Journal, and East West Journal. She hosted radio interview programs in Hawaii and in northern California.

In the early 1990s Christian published a newsletter, Growing Community, about starting new communities. From 1993 to 2007 she was editor of Communities magazine, a quarterly publication of the nonprofit Fellowship for Intentional Community (FIC), about intentional communities and organized neighborhoods in North America.

== Public speaking and workshops ==
Christian speaks, leads workshops, and shows slide presentations on ecovillages in the US and Canada, including Ecovillage Training Center at The Farm in Tennessee, Los Angeles Eco-Village, Lost Valley Educational Center in Oregon, O.U.R. Ecovillage in British Columbia, and Easton Mountain Center in New York. At a 2015 engagement, she spoke on the application of permaculture design principles to ecovillages' financial, legal, and social aspects, in San Diego.

She has led workshops at the North American Cohousing Conference, Twin Oaks Communities Conference, and FIC's Art of Community gathering. Her articles on ecovillages and intentional communities have appeared in publications ranging from Mother Earth News to Canada's This Magazine. She has been quoted in The New York Times, Harper's magazine, and AARP: The Magazine, and has been interviewed by Vision magazine, New Dimensions Radio, NPR, and the BBC.

From at least as early as 2013, and continuing into 2021, Christian has studied and advised communities on governance and decision-making. She is conversant on sociocracy and holacracy and the "N Street Consensus Method", as alternatives to what she terms "consensus with unanimity". She was the keynote speaker at 2013 annual conference of the Swedish Ecovillage Network. In 2020, she is leading online courses in sociocracy.

== Books ==
- 2003, Creating a Life Together: Practical Tools to Grow Ecovillages and Intentional Communities, New Society Publishers; New Ed edition, ISBN 0-86571-471-1, foreword by Patch Adams
- 2006, Vivre autrement: écovillages, communautés et cohabitats, Les éditions Écosociété, ISBN 2-923165-24-1, Préface de Jacques Languirand
- 2007, Finding Community: How to Join an Ecovillage or Intentional Community , New Society Publishers, ISBN 0-86571-578-5
