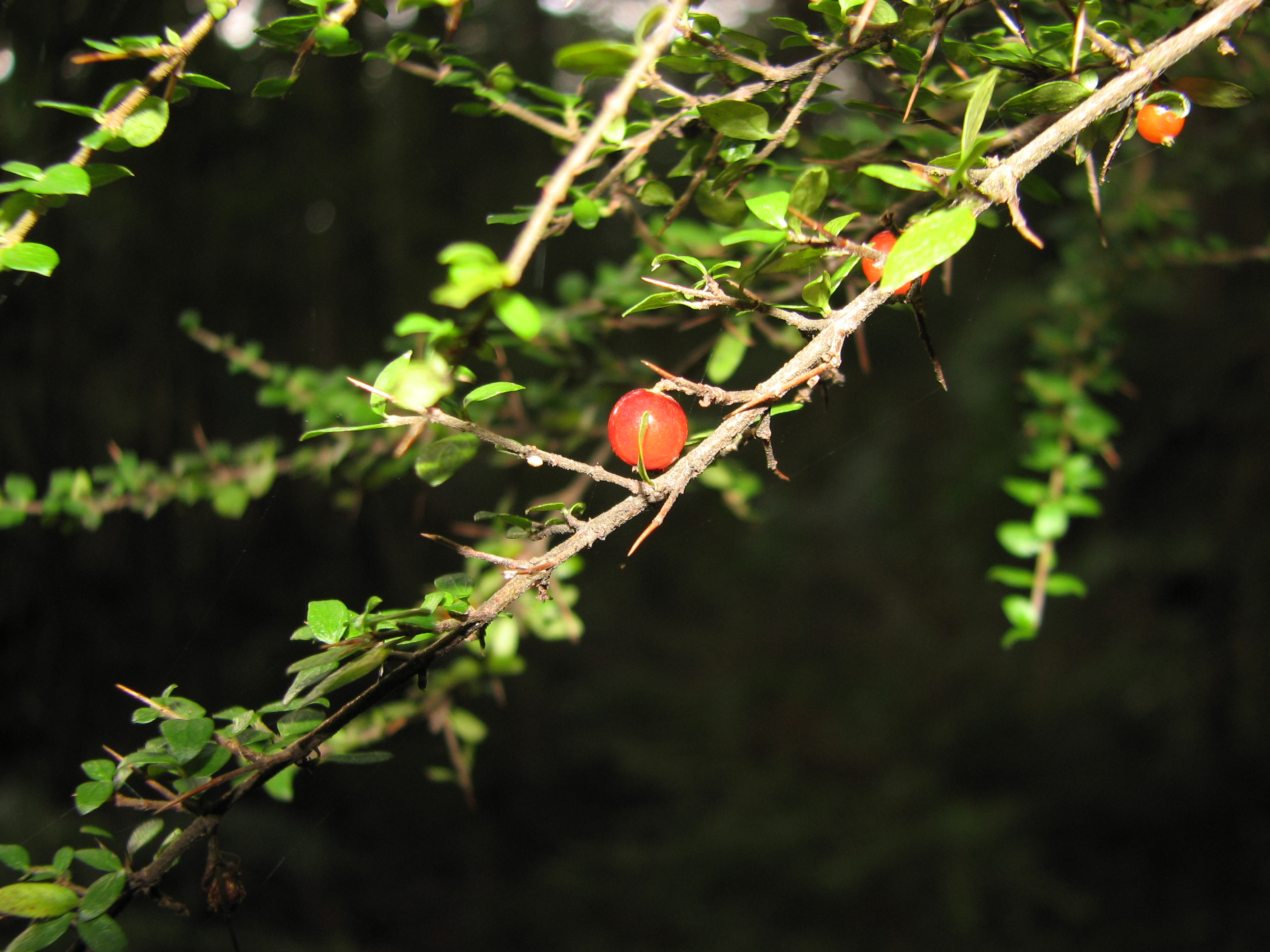
- Coprosma quadrifida Mount Toolebewong, Victoria

Scientific classification
- Kingdom: Plantae
- Clade: Tracheophytes
- Clade: Angiosperms
- Clade: Eudicots
- Clade: Asterids
- Order: Gentianales
- Family: Rubiaceae
- Genus: Coprosma
- Species: C. quadrifida

Binomial name
- Coprosma quadrifida (Labill.) B.L.Rob.

= Coprosma quadrifida =

Species of plant

Coprosma quadrifida is a dioecious shrub of the family Rubiaceae native to southeastern Australia. First described as Canthium quadrifidum by Labillardiere, it was given its current name by B. L. Robinson in 1910. Typically found at damp sites within woodlands, Eucalyptus forests or cool-temperate rainforests, it prefers sheltered slopes or sites near water sources. They are able to withstand frost and are salt tolerant. The species is also known as the Prickly Currant Bush.

== Description ==
These plants are an erect open to dense shrub that can grow to between 2-5m tall. Seed germination can take over six months, with domestically used seed undergoing stratification to reduce germination to 2–4 weeks. Branches remain slender, often tapering to a spine at the point. Like other related species, such as Coprosma nitida, C. quadrifida also displays pubescent branchlets that are spine shaped.

=== Leaves ===
Leaves are of a dull green colouration and lanceolate, or broad ovate, shaped. They are small, typically 5-15mm long and 2-5mm wide. The leaves are also without hairs and display clear reticulate venation underneath. Leaf margins are typically flat or slightly recurved.

=== Flowers ===
Flowering occurs from August to January, with flowers of a greenish coloration. The flowers are sub-sessile, and unisexual, with male and female flowers occurring on separate plants. Flowers are often solitary and are terminal on short branchlets. Male flowers have a cup-shaped calyx and a funnel-shaped corolla. Female flowers have a deeply toothed calyx and a tubular corolla.

=== Fruit ===
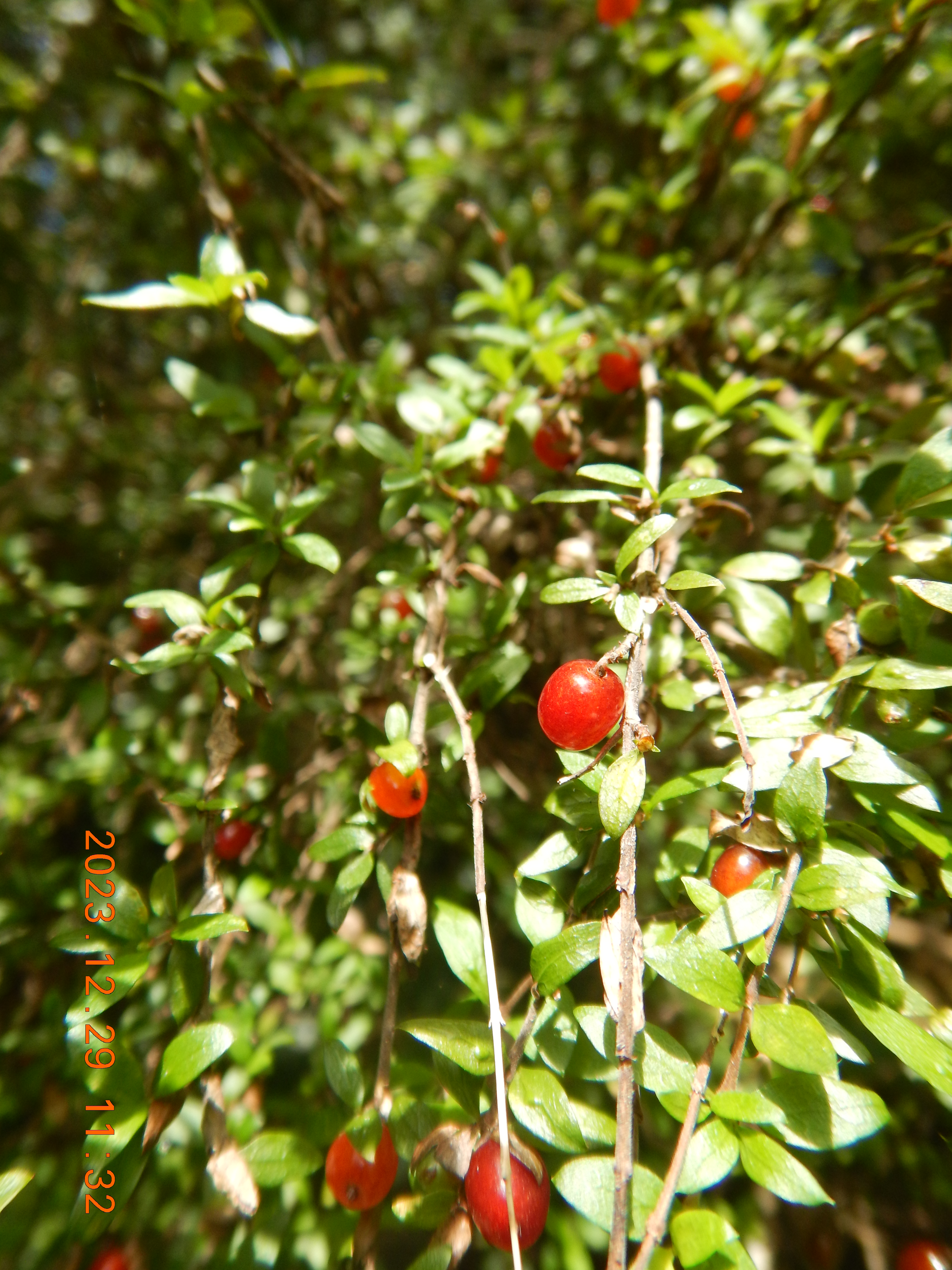
Fruit and leaves of Coprosma quadrifida. Wilsons Promontory, Victoria, Australia.

Fruiting occurs in late summer or early autumn, typically January to March, and results in a drupe style fruit. The fruit is small and globular or egg shaped. It is glossy and ranges in colouration from orange to dark red. The fruit is crowned by the remanent calyx of the flower. The fruit is edible and can be used in cooking, typically in salads or puddings.

=== Historical Description ===
The 1889 book 'The Useful Native Plants of Australia records that Coprosma Billardieri common names included "Native Currant" [sic] and that Indigenous Australians of Coranderrk Station, Victoria, called it "Morr" and that "This plant bears a small round drupe, about the size of a small pea. Mr. Backhouse states that (over half a century ago) when British fruits were scarce, it was made into puddings by some of the settlers of Tasmania, but the size and number of the seeds were objectionable."

== Distribution ==
Individuals of this species have been found in all eastern states of Australia, but it is more common in the south-eastern states (Tasmania, Victoria and in southern New South Wales), due to the more temperate climate.
