= Clousden Hill Free Communist and Co-operative Colony =

Anarchist commune in North Tyneside, England

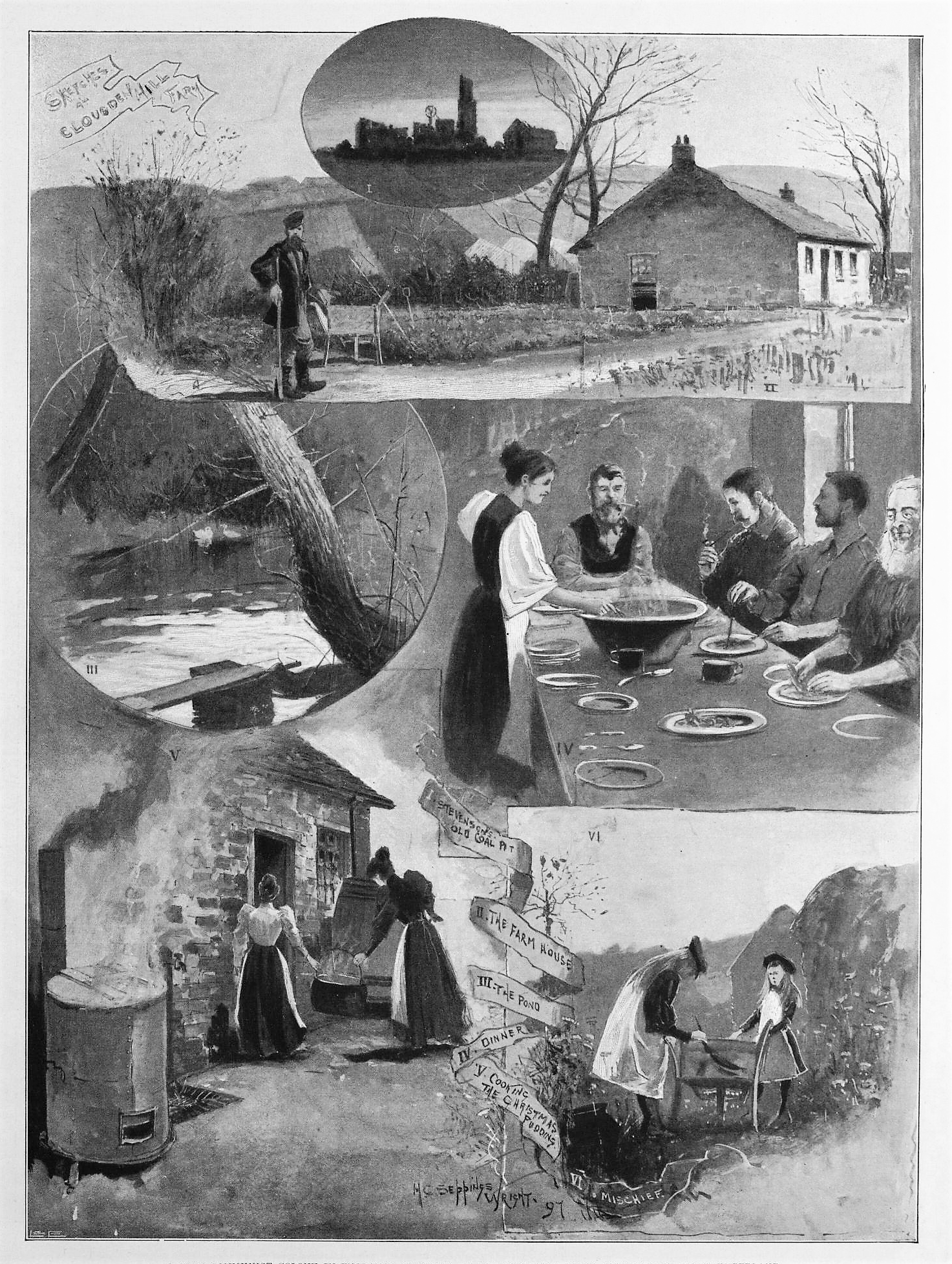
- Depictions of the colony from the Illustrated London News.
- Formation: 1895
- Dissolved: 1898
- Type: Rural anarcho-communist commune
- Key people: Franz Kapper

Clousden Hill Free Communist and Co-operative Colony was an anarcho-communist commune from 1895 until 1898 in Forest Hall, North Tyneside, Tyne and Wear, England. The commune was part of the back-to-the-land movement, operating a 12-acre farm under collective ownership and democratic control.

== History ==
The commune was founded by Franz Kapper and William Key. The founders were in part inspired by the Russian anarchist Peter Kropotkin who in correspondence with the colony expressed his general support, but also stressed his scepticism of small, rural, non-federated, experimental communities. In an 1897 article Italian anarchist Errico Malatesta expressed his support for the colony, but with similar reservations to Kropotkin. Malatesta also raised concern that were reportedly 27 men in the commune, most of whom were young, and only 4 women.

The colony failed in part because of a lack of capital and internal disagreements and tensions. The nature of the internal tensions and disagreement are to some extent still faced by contemporary intentional communities, such as issues of gender and housework, and the sharing of labour more generally.

== Bibliography ==
- Todd, Nigel (2015). Roses and Revolutionists: The Story of the Clousden Hill Free Communist and Co-operative Colony 1894-1909 (2nd ed.). Nottingham, England: Five Leaves Publications. ISBN 978-1-910170-17-5. OCLC 936011582.
