= Synchronicity LA =

Synchronicity LA is an arts-focused intentional community located in the Harvard Heights neighborhood of Los Angeles, California.

Founded in 2008, Synchronicity resides in a nine-bedroom Craftsman home built in 1910. A portion of community members' rent goes toward the purchase of kitchen and gardening supplies, and members have access to a shared music room and production studio. The kitchen features bar-grade beer taps serving cheaper beer at $1 per pint and a more expensive beer for $2. Synchronicity hosts community meals four nights a week, and members share cooking duties based on rotation.

On the second Saturday of each month, Synchronicity hosts a monthly salon where members and outsiders may showcase their work.
