= Intentional community =

Planned, socially cohesive, residential community

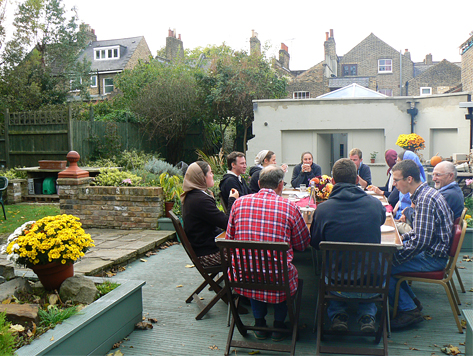
Members of the Anabaptist Christian Bruderhof Communities live, eat, work and worship communally.

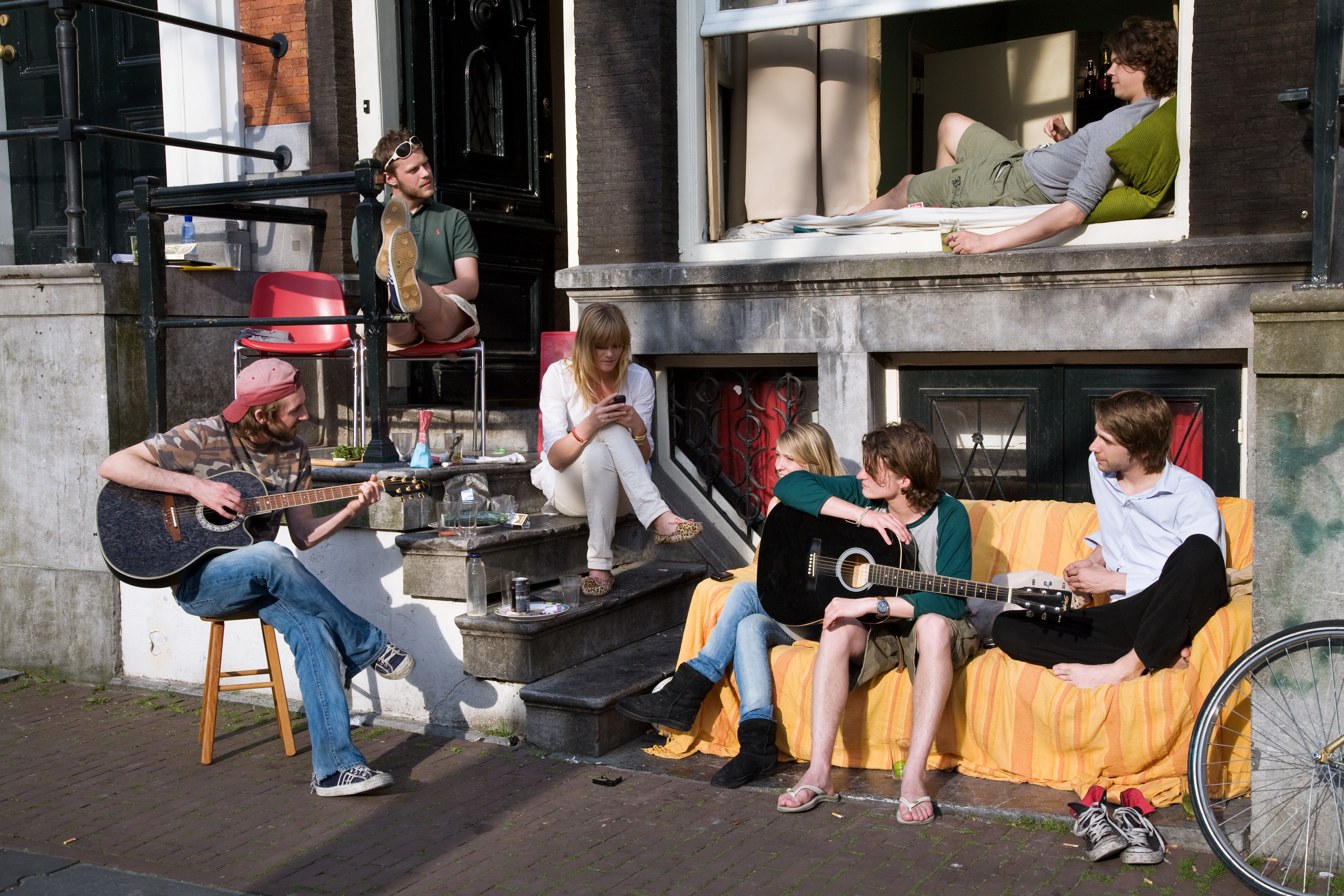
Young musicians living in a shared community in Amsterdam

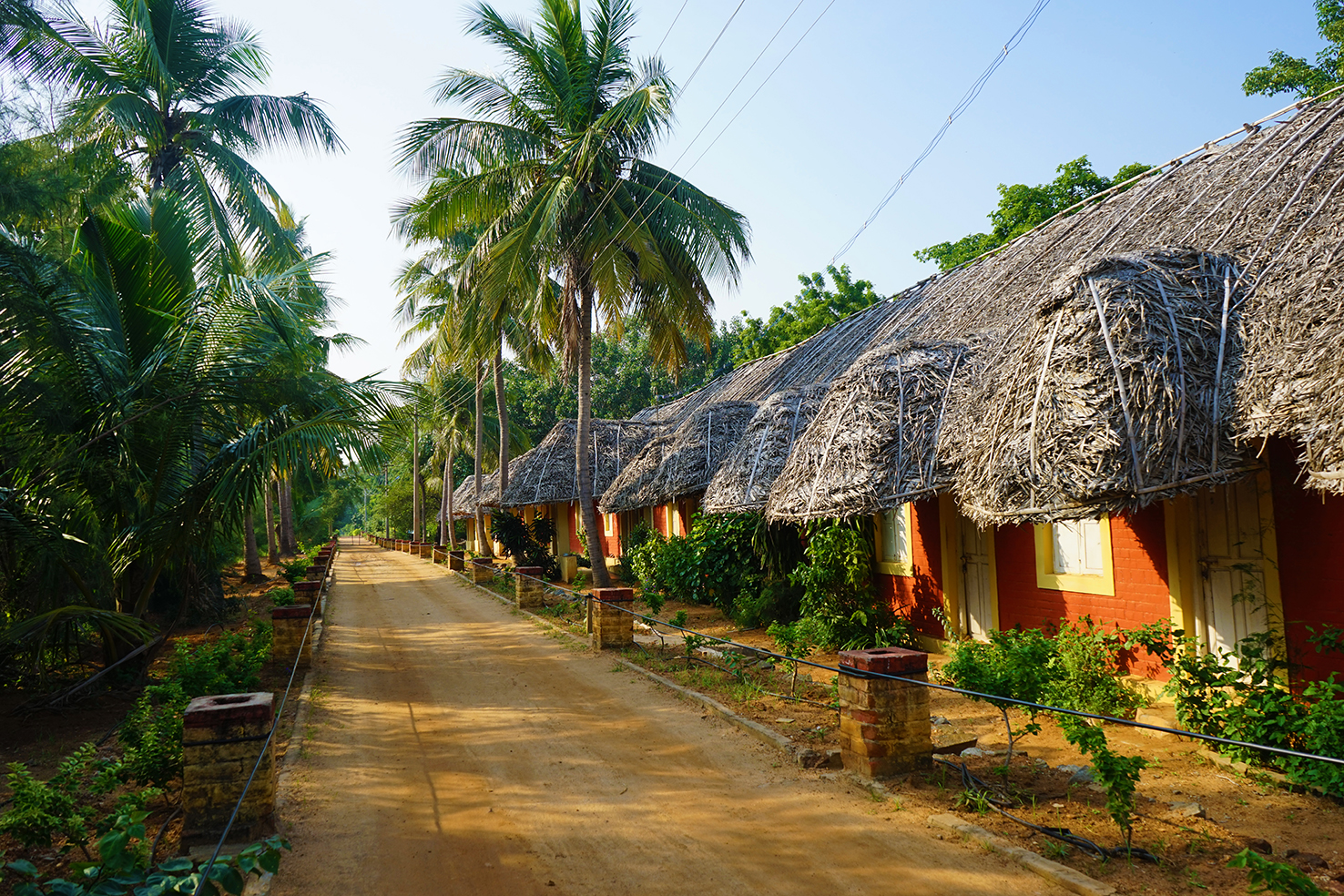
Traditional ashram

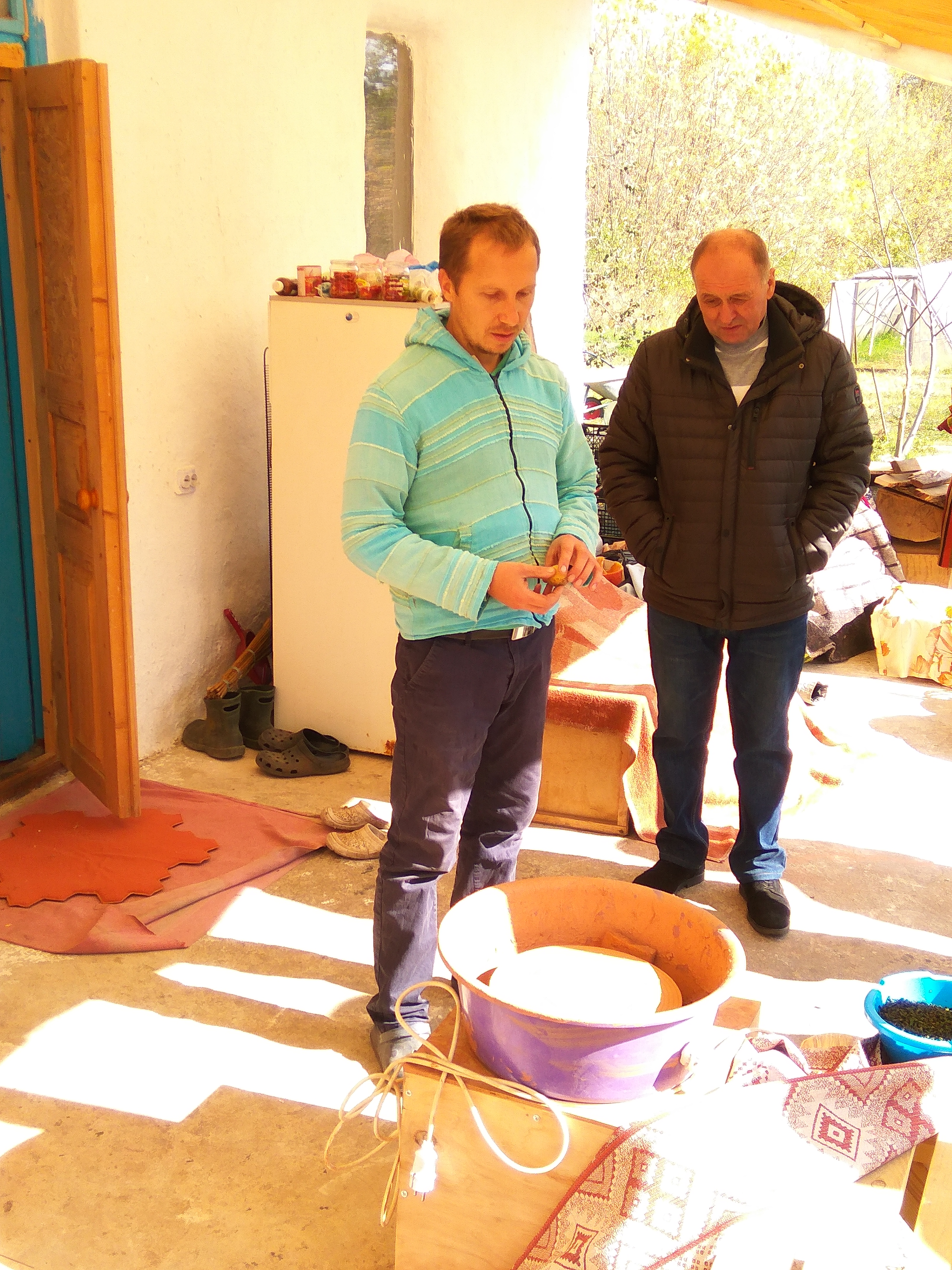
Ecovillage "Velyka Rodyna" in Troshcha (Ukrainian: Троща).

An intentional community or commune is a voluntary residential community designed to foster a high degree of social cohesion and teamwork. Such communities typically promote shared values or beliefs, or pursue a common vision, which may be political, religious, utopian or spiritual, or are simply focused on the practical benefits of cooperation and mutual support. While some groups emphasise shared ideologies, others are centred on enhancing social connections, sharing resources, and creating meaningful relationships.

Some see intentional communities as alternative lifestyles. Others see them as impractical social experiments. Some see them as a natural human response to the isolation and fragmentation of modern housing, offering a return to the social bonds and collaborative spirit found in traditional village life. Others see them as ways to address problems that are seen as plaguing modern cities, such as alcohol abuse, poverty, unemployment and crime, especially when used in conjunction with emigration from industrialized countries and colonization of new lands.

The multitude of intentional communities includes collective households, cohousing communities, coliving, ecovillages, monasteries, survivalist retreats, kibbutzim, Hutterite colonies, ashrams, and housing cooperatives.

As well, planned developments such as some company towns that provided comfortable workers' housing and aspirations of a stable sober workforce, could be considered intentional communities and sometimes even spark from an aspiration for a utopia.

== History ==
Ashrams are likely the earliest intentional communities, founded around 1500 BCE. Buddhist monasteries appeared around 500 BCE. Pythagoras founded an intellectual vegetarian commune in about 525 BCE in southern Italy.

Over the last three hundreds years, hundreds of utopian communities were formed in Europe, North and South America, Australia, and New Zealand, with the intent to create a better, more sustainable world at least locally. This process is continuing in the modern age, as in the case of East Wind Community and green urbanism.

== Synonyms and definitions ==
Additional terms referring to an intentional community can be alternative lifestyle, intentional society, cooperative community, withdrawn community, enacted community, socialist colony, communistic society, collective settlement, communal society, commune, mutualistic community, communitarian experiment, experimental community, utopian experiment, practical utopia, and utopian society.

The term utopian community applied to an intentional community might be considered to be pejorative. Many intentional communities do not consider themselves to be utopian.

The term commune (Note: The word commune is originally a French word appearing in the 12th century from Medieval Latin communia, meaning a large gathering of people sharing a common life; from Latin communis, things held in common.) is considered to be a negative term or even linked to leftist politics or hippies.

Definitions of "intentional community"
Authorship	Year	Definition
B. Shenker	1986	"An intentional community is a relatively small group of people who have created a whole way of life for the attainment of a certain set of goals."
D. E. Pitzer	1989	Intentional communities are "small, voluntary social units partly isolated from the general society in which members share an economic union and lifestyle in an attempt to implement, at least in part, their ideal ideological, religious, political, social, economic, and educational systems".
G. Kozeny	1996	"An 'intentional community' is a group of people who have chosen to live together with a common purpose, working cooperatively to create a lifestyle that reflects their shared core values. The people may live together on a piece of rural land, in a suburban home, or in an urban neighborhood, and they may share a single residence or live in a cluster of dwellings."
W. J. Metcalf	2004	An intentional community is "[f]ive or more people, drawn from more than one family or kinship group, who have voluntarily come together for the purpose of ameliorating perceived social problems and inadequacies. They seek to live beyond the bounds of mainstream society by adopting a consciously devised and usually well thought-out social and cultural alternative. In the pursuit of their goals, they share significant aspects of their lives together. Participants are characterized by a "we-consciousness," seeing themselves as a continuing group, separate from and in many ways better than the society from which they emerged."

== Variety ==
The purposes of intentional communities vary and may be political, spiritual, economic, and environmental.

There are both secular communities and spiritual communities such as Christian intentional communities. One common practice, particularly in spiritual communities, is communal meals.

Members of Christian intentional communities aspire to emulating the practices of the earliest Christians. Using the biblical Acts of the Apostles (and, often, the Sermon on the Mount) as a model, these communities strive to demonstrate their faith in a corporate context, and to live out the teachings of the New Testament, practicing compassion and hospitality. Communities such as the Simple Way, the Bruderhof and Rutba House would fall into this category. Despite strict membership criteria, these communities are open to visitors and not reclusive to the extent of some other intentional communities. Communal living is "highly recommended" for Catholic diocesan clergy because "it encourages apostolic action, also affords an example of charity and unity to the faithful".

A survey in the 1995 edition of the "Communities Directory", published by the Fellowship for Intentional Community (FIC), reported that 54 percent of the communities choosing to list themselves were rural, 28 percent were urban, and 10 percent had both rural and urban sites. (Note: Eight percent did not specify.)

Some communities are based on egalitarian values. Members have equal access to resources and decision-making, or more broadly individual members "possess equal rights and opportunities, supported by affirmative action". Egalitarian values can be combined with other values.

Benjamin Zablocki categorized communities this way:

- Academic communities (see Living-Learning Communities)
- Alternative-family communities (see Tenacious Unicorn Ranch)
- Coliving communities
- Cooperative communities
- Countercultural communities, including the counterculture of the 1960s
- Egalitarian communities
- Experimental communities
- Political communities
- Psychological communities (based on mystical or gestalt principles)
- Rehabilitational communities (see Synanon)
- Religious communities
- Spiritual communities

== Governance ==
The most common form of governance in intentional communities is democratic (64 percent), where decisions are made by some form of consensus decision-making or voting.

A hierarchical or authoritarian structure governs 9 percent of communities. About the same (11 percent) are a combination of democratic and hierarchical structure. (Sixteen percent did not specify.)

== Communes ==
Communes are a general type of intentional communities.

The central characteristics or core principles of communes were expressed differently over the years. The Suffolk-born radical John Goodwyn Barmby (1820–1881), subsequently a Unitarian minister, invented the term "communitarian" in 1840.

At the start of the 1970s, The New Communes author Ron E. Roberts classified communes as a subclass of a larger category of utopias. (Note: Roberts 1971.) He listed three main characteristics: (Note: Roberts 1971.)

- First, egalitarianism – communes specifically rejected hierarchy or graduations of social status as being necessary to social order.
- Second, human scale – members of some communes saw the scale of society as it was then organized as being too industrialized (or factory sized) and therefore unsympathetic to human dimensions.
- Third, communes were consciously anti-bureaucratic.

In "Hippies and the Mystic Way: Dropping Out, Unitive Experiences, and Communal Utopianism," Morgan Shipley asserts that by refusing to engage in political debates – even those common among the "New Leftists" within the hippie subculture – hippies were able to create systems of communal responsibility that emphasized "mystical experiences" above all else.

Twenty-five years later, Dr. Bill Metcalf, in his edited book Shared Visions, Shared Lives, defined communes as having the following core principles: (Note: Metcalf 1996.)

- the importance of the group as opposed to the nuclear family unit
- a "common purse"
- a collective household
- group decision-making in general and intimate affairs

Hippie communes were characterized by deviation from majority society in "every conceivable way," according to Damon R. Bach's book titled The American Counterculture: A History of Hippies and Cultural Dissidents. Bach writes that communes served as a refuge from the values of "mainstream" society, such as consumerism, restrictive social norms, and the military draft.

Sharing everyday life and facilities, a commune is an idealized form of family, being a new sort of "primary group" (generally with fewer than 20 people, although there are examples of much larger communes). Commune members have emotional bonds to the whole group rather than to any sub-group, and the commune is experienced with emotions that go beyond just social collectivity.

However, Benjamin Zablocki writes in "Problems of Anarchism on Hippie Communes" that tensions could arise between the "original family" of commune members and new arrivals. He cites publicity in the media, sexual jealousies, and changes in leadership structure as potential reasons for these strains.

The Fellowship for Intentional Community (FIC) defines a commune as an intentional community with 100% income sharing, the Fellowship's online directory lists 222 communes worldwide (28 January 2019). Some of these are religious institutions such as abbeys and monasteries. Others are based in anthroposophic philosophy, including the Camphill villages, which provide support for the education, employment, and daily lives of adults and children with developmental disabilities, mental health problems or other special needs.

Many cultures practice natural communal or tribal living, and do not designate their way of life as a planned "commune" per se, though their practices have many characteristics of a commune.

== By country ==
=== Australia ===
In Australia, many intentional communities started with the hippie movement and those searching for social alternatives to the nuclear family. One of the oldest continuously running communities is called "Moora Moora Co-operative Community" with about 47 members (Oct 2021). Located at the top of Mount Toolebewong, 65 km east of Melbourne, Victoria at an altitude of 600–800 m, this community has been entirely off the electricity grid since its inception in 1974. Founding members still resident include Peter and Sandra Cock.

=== Canada ===
Intentional communities were established in Canada as early as the first part of the nineteenth century, and some are in operation in Canada at the present time. An Ontario Quaker sect, The Children of Peace, formed a utopian farm settlement at the community of Hope (now Sharon) in East Gwillimbury, York Region, which operated from 1812 to 1889. Other utopian communities were established at Maxwell near Sarnia (an Owenite settlement said to be Canada's first commune) and in BC at Holberg (a Owenite settlement founded in 1829), Ruskin, and Sointula on Malcolm Island (a well-known historical Canadian utopian settlement).

Other settlements were established on temperance, Henry George, Tolstoyan, Doukhobor, Orthodox Mennonite and Hutterite principles.

Canadian utopias also made an appearance on the written page. In the 1897 novel In the New Capital by Edmontonian/Torontonian John Galbraith, the main character time-travels from 1897 to 1999 when a new Ottawa is operating under utopian socialist/single tax/temperance laws. Prairie activist E.A. Partridge discussed the possibilities of a western Canadian utopian co-operative commonwealth called "Coalsamao" in his 1925 book A war on poverty: the one war that can end war. One historian described the 1933 Regina Manifesto as at least partly a utopian document.

Several intentional settlements exist today in Canada.

=== Germany ===
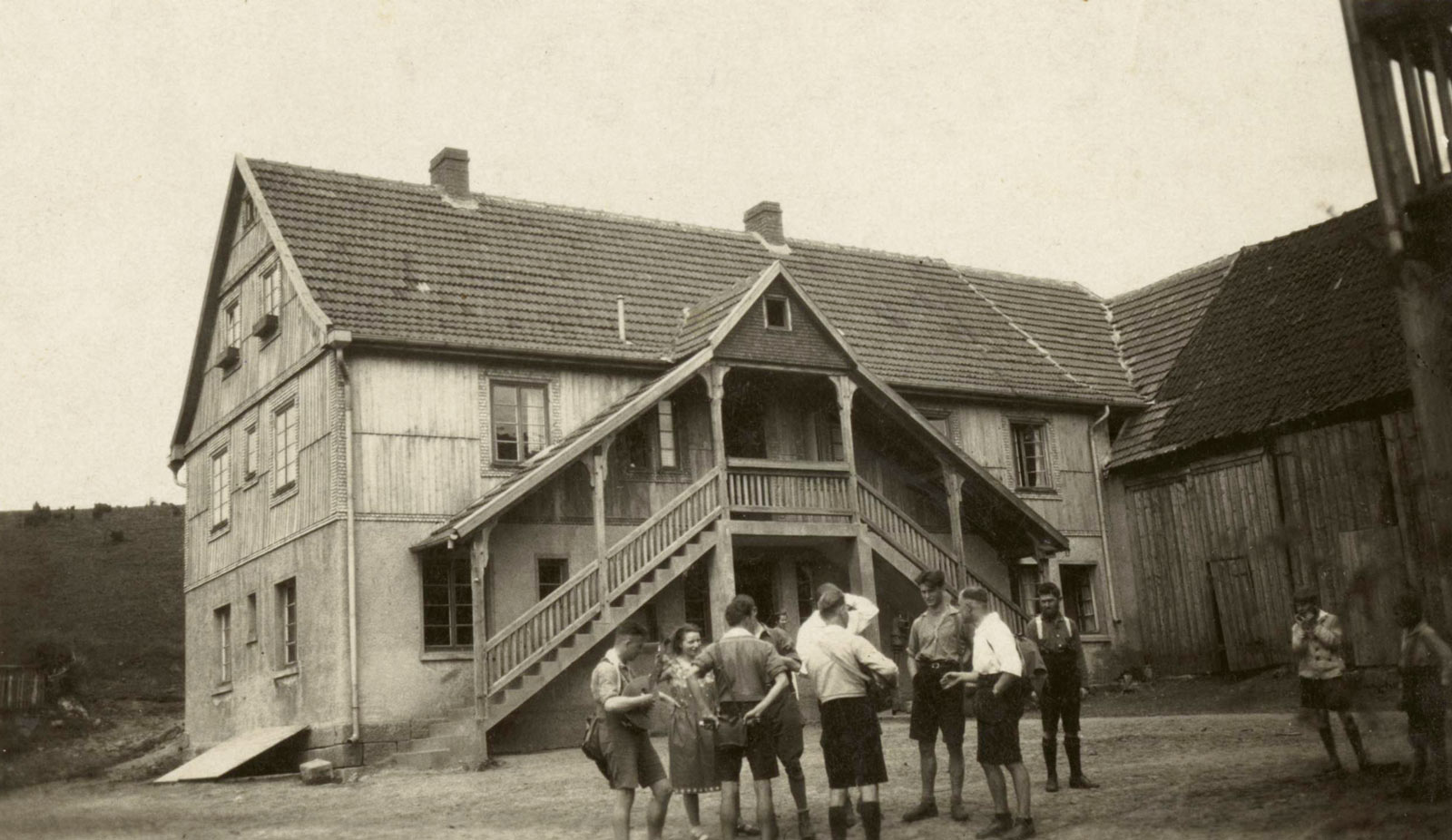
A building on the Rhön Bruderhof

The first wave of utopian communities in Germany began during a period of rapid urbanization between 1890 and 1930. At least about 100 intentional communities are known to have started, but data is unreliable. The communities often pursued nudism, vegetarian and organic agriculture, as well as anabaptism, theosophy, anarchism, socialism, eugenics or other religious and political ideologies. Historically, German emigrants were also influential in the creation of intentional communities in other countries, such as the Bruderhof in the United States of America and Kibbutzim in Israel. In the 1960s, there was a resurgence of communities calling themselves communes, starting with the Kommune 1 in Berlin, without knowledge of or influence by previous movements. A large number of contemporary intentional communities define themselves as communes, and there is a network of political communes called "Kommuja" with about 40 member groups (May 2023).

In the German commune book, Das KommuneBuch, communes are defined by Elisabeth Voß as communities which:

- Live and work together
- Have a communal economy, i.e., common finances and common property (land, buildings, means of production)
- Have communal decision making – usually consensus decision making
- Try to reduce hierarchy and hierarchical structures
- Have communalization of housework, childcare and other communal tasks
- Have equality between women and men
- Have low ecological footprints through sharing and saving resources

=== Israel ===
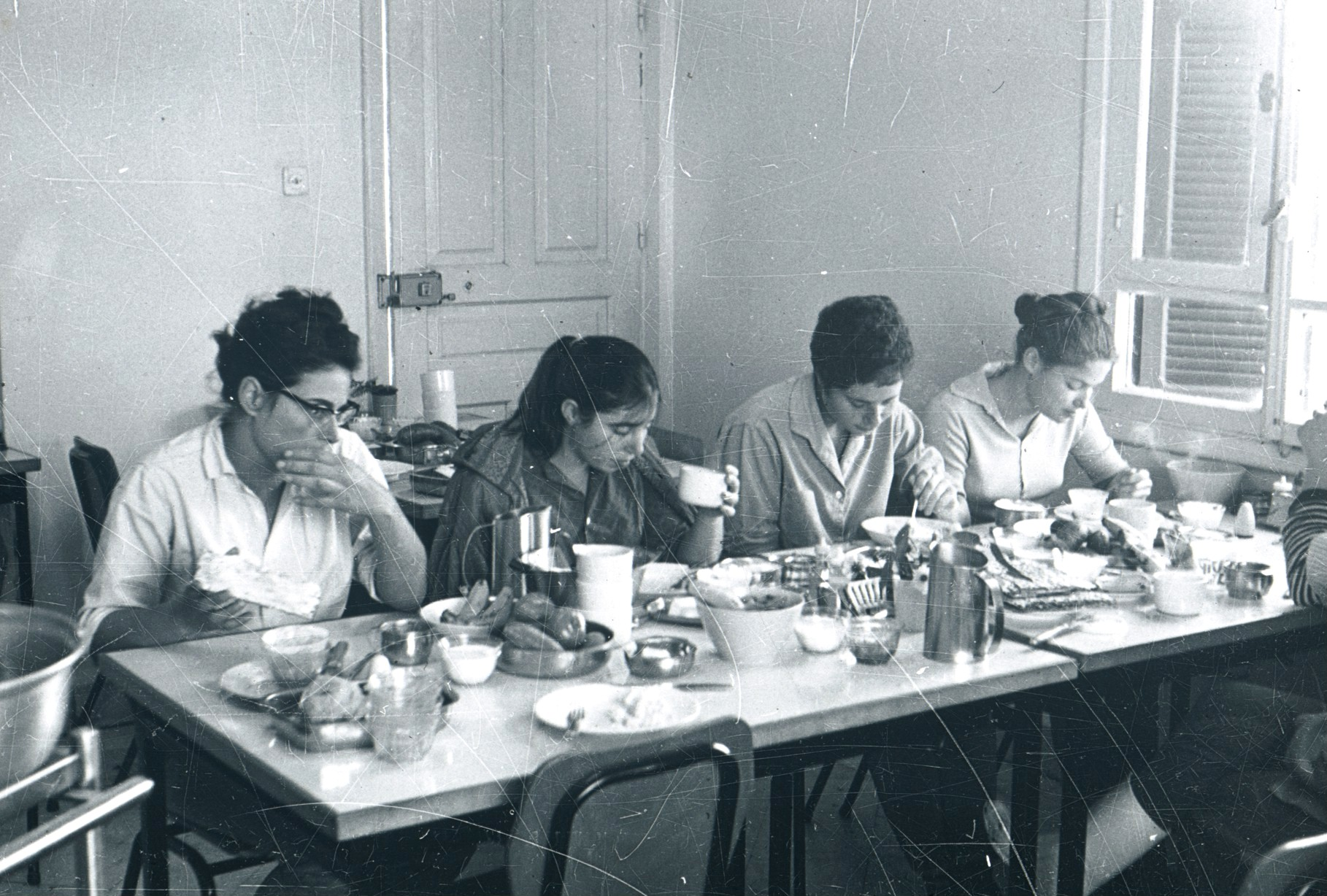
The communal dining hall in Kibbutz Merom Golan, ca. 1968–1972

Kibbutzim in Israel, (sing., kibbutz) are examples of officially organized communes, the first of which were based on agriculture. Other Israeli communities are Kvutza, Yishuv Kehilati, Moshavim and Kfar No'ar. Today, there are dozens of urban communes growing in the cities of Israel, often called urban kibbutzim. The urban kibbutzim are smaller and more anarchist. Most of the urban communes in Israel emphasize social change, education, and local involvement in the cities where they live. Some of the urban communes have members who are graduates of zionist-socialist youth movements, like HaNoar HaOved VeHaLomed, HaMahanot HaOlim and Hashomer Hatsair.

=== Ireland ===
In 1831 John Vandeleur (a landlord) established a commune on his Ralahine Estate at Newmarket-on-Fergus, County Clare. Vandeleur asked Edward Thomas Craig, an English socialist, to formulate rules and regulations for the commune. It was set up with a population of 22 adult single men, 7 married women and their 7 husbands, 5 single women, 4 orphan boys and 5 children under the age of 9 years. No money was employed, only credit notes could be used in the commune shop. All occupants were committed to a life with no alcohol, tobacco, snuff or gambling. All were required to work for 12 hours a day during the summer and from dawn to dusk in winter. The social experiment prospered for a time, and 29 new members joined.

However, in 1833 the experiment collapsed due to the gambling debts of John Vandeleur. The members of the commune met for the last time on 23 November 1833 and placed on record a declaration of "the contentment, peace and happiness they had experienced for two years under the arrangements introduced by Mr. Vandeleur and Mr. Craig and which through no fault of the Association was now at an end".

=== Mexico ===
Topolobampo was the site of an utopian colony from 1886 to 1893. U.S. author Marie Howland and Canadian book publisher John W. Lovell were prominent in the community.

Zihuatanejo Project was a psychedelic training center and intentional community created during the counterculture of the 1960s by Timothy Leary and Richard Alpert in Zihuatanejo, Guerrero.

=== Russia ===
In imperial Russia, the vast majority of Russian peasants held their land in communal ownership within a mir community, which acted as a village government and a cooperative. The widespread and influential pre-Soviet Russian tradition of monastic communities of both genders may be considered a form of communal living. After the end of communism in Russia, monastic communities have again become common, populous and project some influence in Russian society. Various patterns of Russian behavior — toloka (толока), pomochi (помочи), artel (артель) — are based on communal ("мирские") traditions.

In the years after the 1917 revolution Tolstoyan communities proliferated in Russia, but they were eventually wiped out or stripped of their independence due to collectivisation and ideological purges in the late 1920s. The Life and Labor Commune and other colonies relocated to Siberia to avoid being liquidated. Several Tolstoyan leaders, including Yakov Dragunovsky (1886–1937), were sent to Gulag prison camps.

Some Tolstoyans emigrated to Canada.

=== South Africa ===
In 1991, Afrikaners in South Africa founded the controversial Afrikaner-only town of Orania, with the goal of creating a stronghold for the Afrikaner minority group, the Afrikaans language and the Afrikaner culture. By 2022, the population was 2,500. The town was experiencing rapid growth and the population had climbed by 55% from 2018. They favour a model of strict Afrikaner self-sufficiency and have their own currency, bank and local government, and only employ Afrikaners.

=== United Kingdom ===
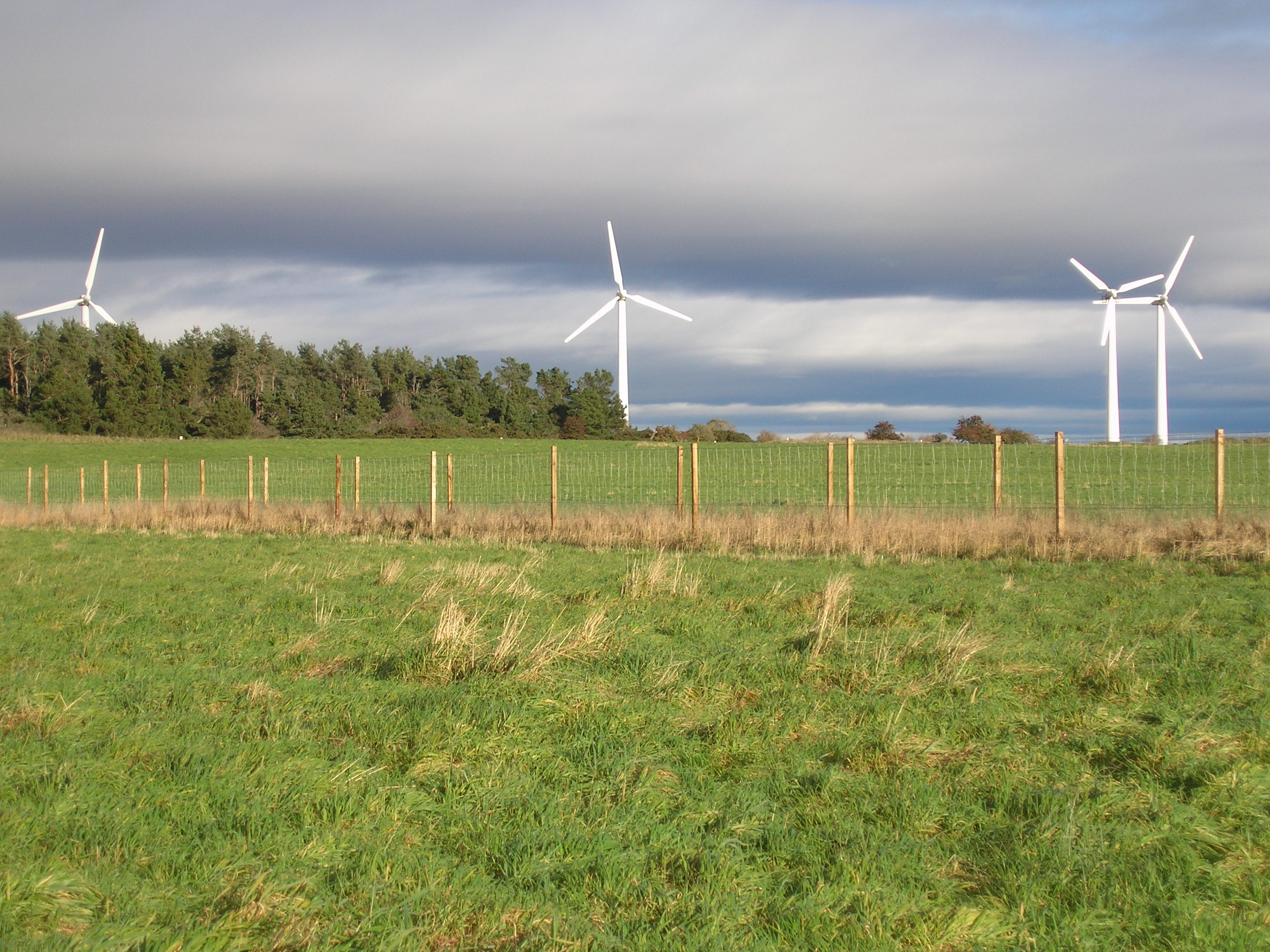
The wind turbines at Findhorn make the Ecovillage a net exporter of electricity.

A 19th century advocate and practitioner of communal living was the utopian socialist John Goodwyn Barmby, who founded a Communist Church before becoming a Unitarian minister.

The Simon Community in London is an example of social cooperation, made to ease homelessness within London. It provides food and religion and is staffed by homeless people and volunteers. Mildly nomadic, they run street "cafés" which distribute food to their known members and to the general public.

The Bruderhof has three locations in the UK. In Glandwr, near Crymych, Pembrokeshire, a co-op called Lammas Ecovillage focuses on planning and sustainable development. Granted planning permission by the Welsh Government in 2009, it has since created 9 holdings and is a central communal hub for its community. In Scotland, the Findhorn Foundation founded by Peter and Eileen Caddy and Dorothy Maclean in 1962 is prominent for its educational centre and experimental architectural community project based at The Park, in Moray, Scotland, near the village of Findhorn.

The Findhorn Ecovillage community at The Park, Findhorn, a village in Moray, Scotland, and at Cluny Hill in Forres, now houses more than 400 people.

Historic agricultural examples include the Diggers settlement on St George's Hill, Surrey during the English Civil War and the Clousden Hill Free Communist and Co-operative Colony near Newcastle upon Tyne during the 1890s.

=== United States ===
A variety of alternative living arrangements, based on aspirations for better living and relief from burden of consumerism and insobriety, dot U.S. history, as demonstrated by attempts, at the large and small scale, to establish intentional communities during the long course of that country's history. Although some communities were established just to help its residents get through poor economic times, such as Depression-era government-sponsored subsistence homesteads and "flight from the city" schemes of Edward Bellamy and Ralph Borsodi, others pursued socialist, anarchist, free-love or other utopian schemes. Even the many company towns in the U.S. in the early 1900s could be considered part of this story. These historic utopian communities predated and led to the rise of the communes of the hippie movement and the "back-to-the-land" ventures of the 1960s and 1970s.

A commune that played a large role in the hippie movement was Kaliflower. This utopian living cooperative started in San Francisco in 1967 with the values of free love and anti-capitalism. Two other prominent communes in northern California at the time were Wheeler's Ranch and Morning Star Ranch.

The majority of residents in American hippie communes were white, upper-middle class young people, according to Gilbert Zicklin's 1983 book Countercultural Communes: A Sociological Perspective. Damon Bach writes that oftentimes, minorities and low-income individuals were hesitant to join communes because they were unlikely to accept voluntary poverty.

Andrew Jacobs of The New York Times wrote in 2006 that "after decades of contraction, the American commune movement has been expanding since the mid-1990s, spurred by the growth of settlements that seek to marry the utopian-minded commune of the 1960s with the American predilection for privacy and capital appreciation". The Fellowship for Intentional Community (FIC) is one of the main sources for listings of and more information about communes in the United States.

Although many American communes are short-lived, some have been in operation for over 50 years. The Bruderhof was established in the US in 1954, Twin Oaks in 1967 and Koinonia Farm in 1942. Twin Oaks is a rare example of a non-religious commune surviving for longer than 30 years. A newer intentional community is Synchronicity LA, founded in 2008.

The phenomena of protest camps, some as recently as 2020, may be considered part of the history of U.S. intentional communities. Freedom colonies were enclaves of freed slaves who sought to live without racist attacks.

The Homestead at Denison University was founded in 1977 by a professor and a group of students, although it faces a forced closure by Denison University in 2027.

== See also ==
- Affinity group
- Anarchist Catalonia
- Anarcho-communism
- Art commune
- Burning Man
- Christian Community of Universal Brotherhood, Canadian Community Doukhobors (1900–1938)
- Common land
- Communal land
- Commune (documentary), a 2005 documentary about Black Bear Ranch, an intentional community located in Siskiyou County, California
- Commune of Paris, 1870
- Community garden
- Cooperatives
- Counterculture of the 1960s
- Diggers and Dreamers
- Drop City
- Ejido, a form of Mexican land distribution resembling a commune
- Equality colony
- Familistère de Guise (Social Palace), France
- Fellowship for Intentional Community
- Free State Project
- Free Vermont
- Great Leap Forward, a time period in the 1950s and 1960s when the Chinese government created such communes
- Hramada, a Belarusian commune assembly or peasant commune; a term adopted by many left-wing parties
- Hutterite, a Christian sect that lives in communal "colonies"
- List of American utopian communities
- List of intentional communities
- Obshchina, communes of the Russian Empire
- People's commune, type of administrative level in China from 1958 – early 1980s
- Phalanstère, France
- Renaissance Community
- Slab City, California
- Squatting
- Tolstoyans
- Temporary Autonomous Zone
- List of American utopian communities
- Well-field system, a Chinese land distribution system with common lands controlled by a village
- World Brotherhood Colonies

== Sources ==
- Conti, Christoph (1984). Abschied vom Bürgertum. Alternative Bewegungen in Deutschland von 1890 bis heute (in German). Reinbeck.
- Curl, John (2007). Memories of Drop City, The First Hippie Commune of the 1960s and the Summer of Love, a memoir. iUniverse. ISBN 0-595-42343-4. Red-coral.net
- Curl, John (2009) For All The People: Uncovering the Hidden History of Cooperation, Cooperative Movements, and Communalism in America, PM Press. ISBN 978-1-60486-072-6.
- Fitzgerald, George R. (1971). Communes Their Goals, Hopes, Problems. New York: Paulist Press.
- Hall, John R. (1978). The Ways Out: Utopian Communal Groups in an Age of Babylon. London: Routledge & Kegan Paul.
- Horrox, James. (2009). A Living Revolution: Anarchism in the Kibbutz Movement. Oakland: AK Press.
- Margaret Hollenbach. (2004)Lost and Found: My Life in a Group Marriage Commune. University of New Mexico Press, ISBN 0-8263-3463-6.
- Roberts, Ron E. (1971). The new communes: coming together in America. Prentice-Hall. ISBN 9780136124733.
- Kanter, Rosabeth Moss. (1972) Commitment and community: communes and utopias in sociological perspective. Cambridge, Massachusetts, Harvard University Press. ISBN 0-674-14575-5
- Kanter, Rosabeth Moss. (1973) Communes: creating and managing the collective life. New York, Harper & Row. ISBN 0-06-043476-7
- Lattin, Don. (2003, March 2) Twilight of Hippiedom. The San Francisco Chronicle. Retrieved March 16, 2008
- Lauber, John. (1963, June). Hawthorne's Shaker Tales [Electronic version]. Nineteenth-Century Fiction, Vol. 18, 82–86.
- Metcalf, Bill; Metcalf, William James (1996). Shared visions, shared lives: communal living around the globe. Scotland: Findhorn Press. ISBN 1-899171-01-0.
- Meunier, Rachel. (1994, December 17). Communal Living in the Late 60s and Early 70s. Retrieved March 16, 2008, from thefarm.org
- Miller, Timothy. (1997) "Assault on Eden: A Memoir of Communal Life in the Early '70s", Utopian Studies, Vol. 8, 1997.
- Roberts, Ron E. (1971). The New Communes Coming Together in America. New Jersey: Prentice Hall inc.
- Van Deusen, David. (2008) Green Mountain Communes: The Making of a Peoples’ Vermont, Catamount Tavern News Service.
- Veysey, Laurence R. (1978) The Communal Experience: Anarchist and Mystical Communities in Twentieth Century America
- Voß, Elisabeth (1996). "Was ist eine Kommune?" [What is a commune?]. Das KommuneBuch [The Commune Book] (in German). Göttingen: Verlag Die Werkstatt. ISBN 3-89533-162-7.
- Wedemeyer-Kolwe, Bernd (2017). Aufbruch: Die Lebensreform in Deutschland (in German). Darmstadt: Philipp von Zabern. ISBN 978-3-8053-5067-9.
- Wild, Paul H. (1966 March). Teaching Utopia [Electronic version]. The English Journal, Vol. 55, No. 3, 335–37, 339.
- Zablocki, Benjamin. (1980, 1971) The Joyful Community: An Account of the Bruderhof: A Communal Movement Now in Its Third Generation (University of Chicago Press, 1971, reissued 1980), ISBN 0-226-97749-8. (The 1980 edition of the Whole Earth Catalog called this book "the best and most useful book on communes that's been written".)
- Zablocki, Benjamin. (1980) Alienation and Charisma: A Study of Contemporary American Communes (The Free Press, 1980), ISBN 0-02-935780-2.
