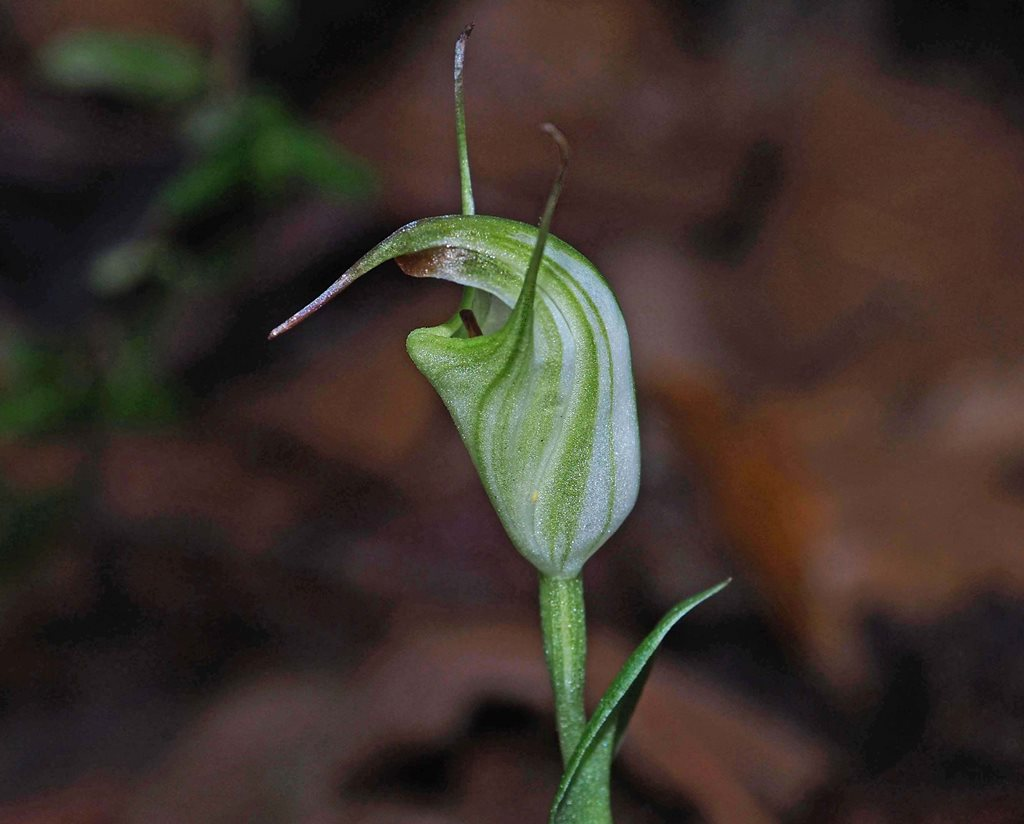
- Pterostylis atrans growing near Mount Toolebewong

Scientific classification
- Kingdom: Plantae
- Clade: Tracheophytes
- Clade: Angiosperms
- Clade: Monocots
- Order: Asparagales
- Family: Orchidaceae
- Subfamily: Orchidoideae
- Tribe: Cranichideae
- Genus: Pterostylis
- Species: P. atrans

Binomial name
- Pterostylis atrans D.L.Jones

Synonyms
- Diplodium atrans (D.L.Jones) D.L.Jones & M.A.Clem.

= Pterostylis atrans =

Dark-tip greenhood

Species of orchid

Pterostylis atrans, commonly known as the dark-tip greenhood or blunt-tongue greenhood, is a species of orchid endemic to south-eastern Australia. As with similar greenhoods, plants in flower differ from those that are not flowering. The non-flowering plants have a rosette of leaves flat on the ground, but the plants in flower have a single flower with leaves on the flowering stem. In this species, the flower is green and reddish brown with a protruding sinus and small club-like tips on the ends of the lateral sepals.

== Description ==
Pterostylis atrans is a terrestrial, perennial, deciduous, herb with an underground tuber and when not flowering, a rosette of ovate leaves, each leaf 10–35 mm long and 10–30 mm wide. Flowering plants have a single flower 14–20 mm long and 10–12 mm wide borne on a stem 150–300 mm high with between three and five spreading stem leaves. The flowers are green with a reddish-brown, down curved tip. The dorsal sepal and petals are fused, forming a hood or "galea" over the column and the dorsal sepal has a thread-like tip 6–9 mm long. The lateral sepals are held closely against the galea, have erect, thread-like tips 15–20 mm long with small club-like tips and a protruding, platform-like sinus between their bases. The labellum is 9–11 mm long, about 3 mm wide, green with a blunt brown tip that is just visible above the sinus. Flowering occurs from November to April.

== Taxonomy and naming ==
Pterostylis atrans was first formally described in 1994 by David Jones from a specimen collected in the Brindabella Range. The description was published in Muelleria. The specific epithet is "from the Latin word atrans, darkening, in reference to the dark red-brown colouration towards the apex of the galea".

== Distribution and habitat ==
The dark-tip greenhood mostly grows among grasses in high rainfall forests in Victoria, Tasmania and southern New South Wales.
