= Patch Adams =

American physician, activist (born 1945)

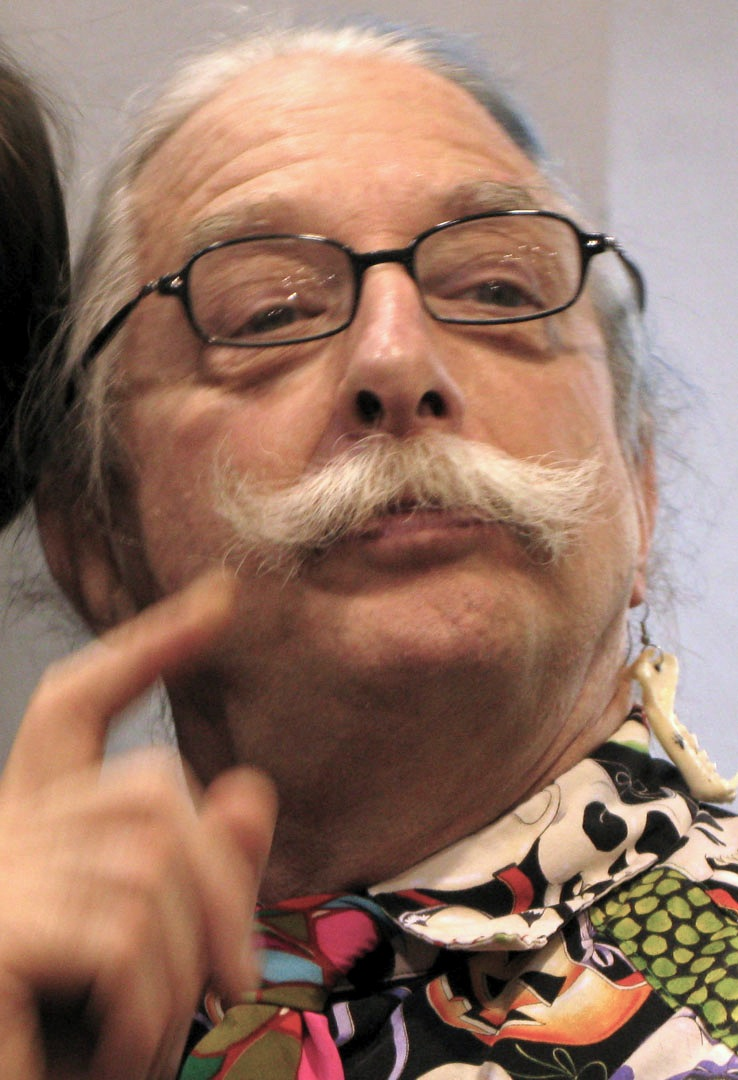
- Adams in 2009
- Born: Dr Hunter Doherty Adams; May 28, 1945 (age 81); Washington, D.C., U.S.
- Education: Virginia Commonwealth University (MD)
- Occupations: Physician; comedian; social activist; clown; author
- Spouses: Linda Edquist (m. 1975; div. 1998) Susan Parenti (m. 2010)
- Children: 2

Hunter Doherty "Patch" Adams (born May 28, 1945) is an American physician, comedian, social activist, clown, and author. He founded the Gesundheit! Institute as a not-for-profit in 1989. Each year he also organizes volunteers from around the world to travel to various countries where they dress as clowns to bring humor to orphans, patients, and other people.

Adams is currently based in Urbana, Illinois. In collaboration with the institute, he promotes an alternative health care model not funded by insurance policies.

== Early life and education ==
Adams was born on May 28, 1945, in Washington, D.C., the son of Anna Campbell Stewart (née Hunter) and Robert Loughridge Adams. His maternal grandfather, Thomas Lomax Hunter, was a Poet Laureate of Virginia. His father, a United States Army officer who fought in the Korean War, died while stationed in West Germany when Adams was 16. After his father's death, Adams returned to the United States with his mother and brother. Adams has stated that upon his return he encountered racism and segregation amongst his peers against which he stood up, and this made him a target for bullies at school. As a result, Adams was unhappy and became actively suicidal. After a third hospitalization in one year he decided "you don't kill yourself, stupid; you make revolution."

He attended Wakefield High School, where he graduated in 1963, and then completed pre-med coursework at George Washington University. He began medical school without even earning an undergraduate degree, and earned his Doctor of Medicine degree at the Medical College of Virginia in the Virginia Commonwealth University in 1971. In the late 1960s, one of his closest friends (a man, not a woman as depicted in the film) was murdered by a deranged patient. Convinced of the powerful connection between environment and wellness, he believes the health of an individual cannot be separated from the health of the family, community, and the world.

=== Gesundheit! Institute ===
Gesundheit! Institute
- Founded: 1989
- Founder: Hunter "Patch" Adams
- Type: Not-for-profit health care
- Tax ID no.: 52-1573251
- Location: Hillsboro, West Virginia, U.S.
- Services: Integrative medicine
- Key people: Chair, Cari Brackett, Pharm.D; John T. Glick, MD; Susan R. Parenti, DMA
- Website: www.patchadams.org

Soon after graduation, Patch, his wife Linda, and friends started to develop the ideas that eventually led to The Gesundheit! Institute. Originally as the Zanies, they ran as a communal "home" from 1971 to 1984. In 1989 Gesundheit! Institute was founded as a not-for-profit, and has continued to develop to this day. Adams was one of the first people to go to hospitals to therapeutically help patients, and helped found the practice. Based in Adams' rural West Virginia property, the institute has since been devoted to fundraising. As of September 2016 the current plan was for a 44-bed community hospital building that would offer free holistic care to "anyone who wants it", along with a teaching facility that would accommodate "120 staff, all living together in the communal ecovillage".

Fees from the 1998 movie "made it possible to build three beautiful buildings... in preparation for the big buildings we want for the hospital". These are a farmhouse, workshop and dacha that accommodate the workshops and courses offered by the institute. The educational philosophy is contained in their "School for Designing a Society (SDaS) – for people who want to change society by means of desire, design, and composition..." and includes courses on caring and workshops on clowning.

Adams was awarded the Peace Abbey Courage of Conscience Award on January 29, 1997.

In 2008, Adams agreed to become honorary chair of the "International Association for the Advancement of Creative Maladjustment" or IAACM. MindFreedom International, a nonprofit coalition that Gesundheit! belongs to as a sponsor group, launched the IAACM to support "creative maladjustment" and social change.

Since the 1990s Adams has supported the Ithaca Health Alliance (IHA) in Ithaca, New York, founded as the Ithaca Health Fund (IHF) by Paul Glover. In January 2006, IHA launched the Ithaca Free Clinic, bringing to life key aspects of Adams's vision. Adams has also given strong praise to Health Democracy, Glover's book written and published the same year.

As of 2016, Adams claims to "lecture 300 days out of the year, and have done so for over 30 years in 81 countries, spreading seeds of a love revolution of enlivening community and a call to end capitalism".

== In media ==
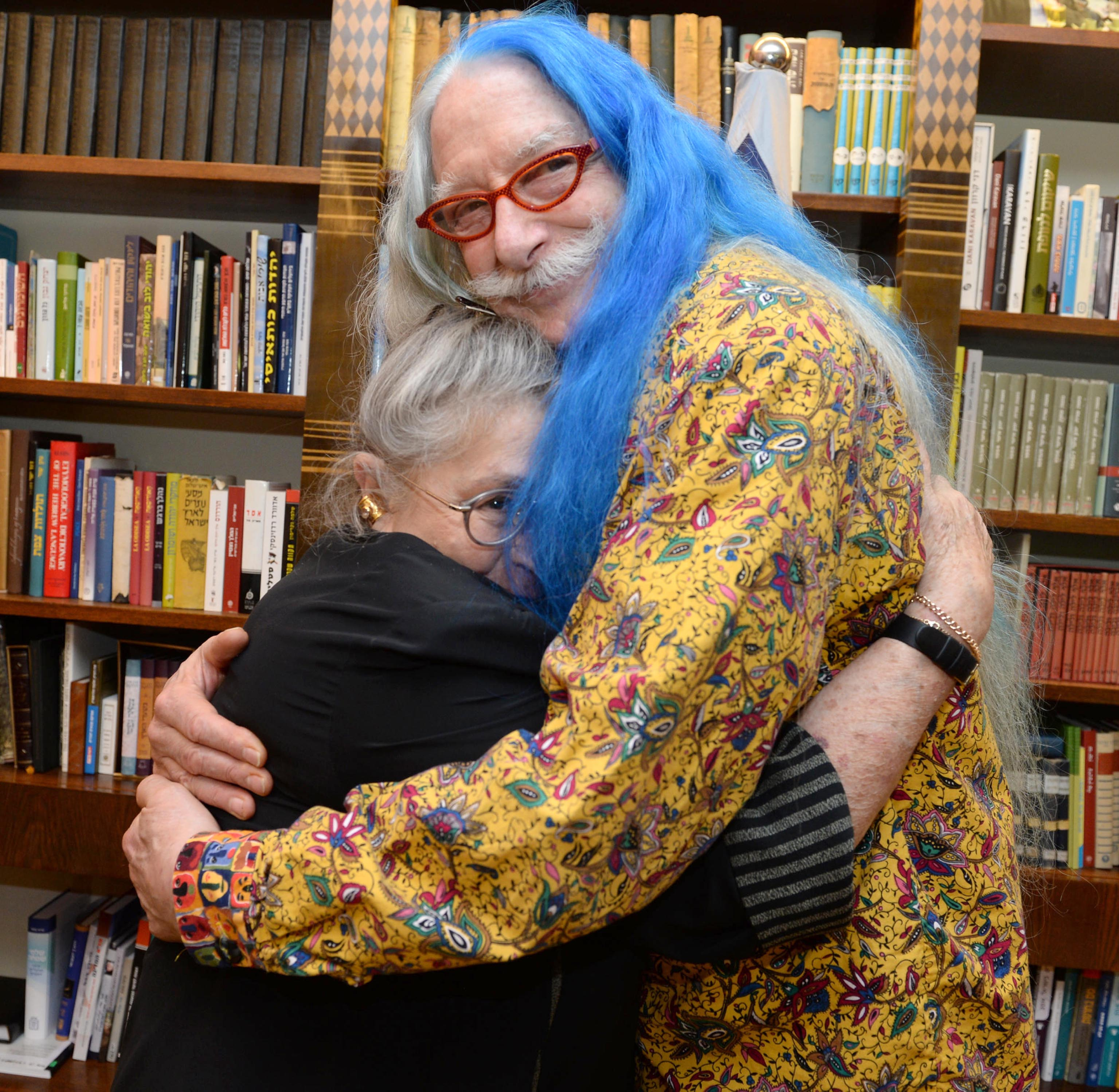
Adams with Nechama Rivlin in Award Ceremony of the Danielle Prize Healing with a Heart in April 2017

The 1998 film Patch Adams was based on Adams's life and his views on medicine. Adams has harshly criticized the film, saying it eschewed an accurate representation of his beliefs in favor of commercial viability. He said that out of all aspects of his life and activism, the film portrayed him merely as a funny doctor. Patch Adams also said of Robin Williams in an interview, "He made $21 million for four months of pretending to be me, in a very simplistic version, and did not give $10 to my free hospital. Patch Adams, the person, would have, if I had Robin's money, given all $21 million to a free hospital in a country where 80 million cannot get care."

In another interview, Adams clarified that he did not dislike Williams, saying, "I think Robin himself is compassionate, generous and funny. I like to think that that's who I am, and so I think he was the only actor I wanted to play me, and I think he did a fabulous job." Williams also had actively supported St. Jude Children's Research Hospital for several years.

Upon hearing of Williams' suicide in 2014, Adams released a statement that praised Williams' comedic and improvisational skills on set; noted his compassionate and caring nature; remarked upon his introverted demeanour in private, and his desire for solitude; and thanked him for "his wonderful performance".

As a speaker, Adams travels around the globe lecturing about his medicine methods. Through the Global Outreach Program of the Gesundheit Institute, Adams set out on clowning missions to places impacted by natural disasters, including his time at Sri Lanka post-tsunami.

== Personal life ==
While working in an adolescent clinic at VCU School of Medicine, in his final year of med school, he met Linda Edquist, a fellow VCU student who volunteered in the clinic. Adams and Edquist married in 1975, and had two sons. The couple divorced in 1998. In 2010, Adams married Susan Parenti (born in 1950).

In March 2021, Adams announced that his left foot had been amputated in a below-the-knee amputation due to persistent problems from an MRSA infection.

== Publications ==
- Adams, Patch; Maureen Mylander (1998). Gesundheit!: Bringing Good Health to You, the Medical System, and Society through Physician Service, Complementary Therapies, Humor, and Joy. Rochester, Vermont: Healing Arts Press. ISBN 978-0-89281-781-8. LCCN 99187488.
- Adams, Patch (1998). House calls. Cartoons by Jerry Van Amerongen. San Francisco: Robert D. Reed Publishers. ISBN 978-1-885003-18-8. LCCN 98034266.
- Patch Adams wrote forewords for books by Pamela Wible (2012), Pet Goats & Pap Smears: 101 Medical Adventures to Open Your Heart & Mind ISBN 978-0985710309 and by Diana Leafe Christian (2003), Creating a Life Together: Practical Tools to Grow Ecovillages and Intentional Communities ISBN 0-86571-471-1.

== Bibliography ==
- Adams, Patch; Maureen Mylander (1998). Gesundheit! [sound recording]. Los Angeles: NewStar Media. ISBN 978-0-7871-1828-0. LCCN 00717433. 4 sound cassettes (ca. 6 hr.) : digitally mastered, Dolby processed.
- Adams, Patch (1998). House calls. cartoons by Jerry Van Amerongen. San Francisco: Robert D. Reed Publishers. ISBN 978-1-885003-18-8. LCCN 98034266.
- Bourque, Judith (1999). The real Patch Adams (videorecording) / a film by Judith Bourque. Oley, PA: Bullfrog Films. ISBN 978-1-56029-811-3. LCCN 2003389123. 1 videocassette (53 min.) : sd., col. ; 1/2 in.
- John Graham for the Giraffe Heroes Program (1999). It's up to us. foreword by Patch Adams. Langley, Washington: Giraffe Project. ISBN 978-1-893805-00-2. LCCN 99097193.

== See also ==
- Clown Care
- Humor research
