= Communities Directory =

Cover of printed Directory, 2007

Cover of printed Directory, 2005

The Communities Directory, A Comprehensive Guide to Intentional Community provides a listing of intentional communities primarily from North America but also from around the world. Communities Directory has both an online and a print edition, which is published based on data from the website.

== History ==
The first version of the Communities Directory appeared in issue #1 of Communities magazine in December 1972. In all, ten versions were published in the magazine over the next 18 years. The Fellowship for Intentional Community became publisher of the magazine in 1989, and in 1990 released the first self-contained book-format edition of the directory (also distributed to magazine subscribers, counted as double issue #77/78).

The Communities Directory is now in its 7th edition. Editions were published in 1990, 1995, 2000, 2005, 2007, 2010 and 2016. The production cycle has been shortened due to the online collection of data. The 4th edition lists 600 communities in North America and another 130 worldwide. The 5th edition lists almost 1250 communities worldwide.

There is also a companion video Visions of Utopia: Experiments in Sustainable Culture that outlines the history of intentional shared living and profiles a diverse cross-section of contemporary groups (external link included below).

The Online Communities Directory database is shared by members of the Intentional Community Data Collective which includes the Fellowship for Intentional Community and Coho/US's Cohousing Directory.

== Publisher ==
The Communities Directory is published by Fellowship for Intentional Community, which also publishes the quarterly magazine Communities.

== See also ==
- Cohousing
- Commune (intentional community)
- Diggers and Dreamers
- Ecovillage
- Fellowship for Intentional Community
- Intentional Community
- List of intentional communities
