= Foundation for Intentional Community =

Networking organisation for residential communities

- Location: Rutledge, Missouri, US
- Revenue: 193,124 United States dollar (2020)
- Total Assets: 98,375 United States dollar (2020)
- Website: www.ic.org

The Foundation for Intentional Community (FIC), formerly the Fellowship of Intentional Communities then the Fellowship for Intentional Community, provides publications, referrals, support services, and "sharing opportunities" for intentional communities and people seeking them. The FIC is a nonprofit 501(c)(3) organization in the United States.

== Activities ==
The FIC currently publishes the Communities Directory, and the Intentional Communities website. It also sponsors and presents periodic Community gatherings, including annual gatherings at Twin Oaks Community and other community-related events online and in various locations around the US.

== Organizational history ==
=== 2019 – Present ===
The summer 2019 Communities magazine issue reported a second name change for the FIC, this time to the "Foundation for Intentional Community." A new logo was created, an executive group of co-directors was instituted, and the FIC agreed to transfer Communities magazine to the Global Ecovillage Network – United States (GEN-US), a fellow GENNA Alliance member organization. With the Covid-19 pandemic beginning that year, most in-person community networking meetings ceased.

While the 1st Fellowship relied upon Community Service, and the 2nd Fellowship relied upon the Federation of Egalitarian Communities, the Foundation soon grew to be self-supporting through income from its own programs, especially the registrations for its online workshops, webinars, and trainings. The 2nd Fellowship had paid some staff members, yet with increasing income since 2020 the Foundation has been able to increase its staffing, providing improved and additional movement services.

Online community movement networking continued through the pandemic and after, and the new FIC began a series of virtual events, connecting people in community with each other, and connecting with those not in community who are interested in the lifestyle. The 2020 FIC Annual Report stated that the FIC’s online workshops and trainings attracted over 3,500 people paying sliding-scale registrations. Nearly a half-million people visited the FIC’s free online directory at IC.org, which presented over 1,000 intentional communities. 10,000 copies of free FIC e-books and guides were downloaded, and 1,500 books were distributed worldwide.

In 2020 the FIC created the BIPOC Intentional Communities Fund to encourage and support Black, Indigenous, and People of Color in joining or forming intentional community. Ten percent of unrestricted donations to the FIC have been contributed to the fund. A BIPOC Council of interested persons was created to carry on outreach, and to set criteria for managing the fund and for granting awards. The Council began its first funding round in July, 2021.

The 2021 FIC Annual Report states the organization’s mission as, "We uplift, connect, and empower all those venturing to join, grow, and learn from intentional communities." And its vision as, "We envision a just, resilient, and cooperative world where everyone has the opportunity to thrive in community." That year the FIC began a series of very successful five-week courses on intentional community, which provides the largest amount of revenue of all the FIC programs, accounting for half of the organization’s income.

=== 1986 – 2019 ===
While the First Fellowship was begun by and largely sustained by Community Service and members of The Vale community, the Second Fellowship was largely sustained by the Federation of Egalitarian Communities (FEC) founded in 1976, especially its largest member groups: Twin Oaks and East Wind. Both Community Service and the Federation devoted money and personnel to network the larger communities movement, for one decade in the case of Community Service, and for three decades in the case of the FEC.

Ten years after the founding of the Federation, the Federation was well established and organized, and had been considering how to engage with the larger communities movement. The FEC represented a small network of communities, with from 200 to maybe 250 people at the most. With both community-owned businesses and domestic reproduction integrated in a communal, gender-equal, labor-sharing, time-based economy in each community, the FEC contributed time, money, and skills on a stable, long-term basis to the revitalized continental community networking organization, the 2nd Fellowship.

Stelle Community in northern Illinois was started in 1973 with the intent of being a center for the survival of the human race beyond the disaster prophesied for the end of the millennium. One member of the community, Charles Betterton, believed that intentional community is important to the survival and growth of humanity, and began working for the intentional communities movement, looking to network existing organizations rather than form a new one.

During the years 1983 to ’86 Charles Betterton took a number of initiatives to build an inclusive community networking organization. Among them, he advocated the networking of existing intentional communities at academic conferences of the National Historic Communal Societies Association (NHCSA), now the Communal Societies Association (CSA), and negotiated with Twin Oaks Community to begin managing in 1984 Communities magazine, the movement journal that had been created at the 1972 Twin Oaks Communities Conference from a merger of three pre-existing publications: Communitas, named after the 1947 book by Paul and Percival Goodman, published in Yellow Springs, Ohio; Communitarian, a project of the Walden Three community in Providence, Rhode Island; and Alternatives journal, produced by the Alternatives Foundation or Alternatives Northwest at Limesaddle Community in Northern California. Alternatives was related to Richard Fairfield’s Modern Utopian newsletter and book. Several people at Stelle and elsewhere were attracted to Charles’ vision, working together to help realize it.

Charles Betterton attended the spring 1986 combined FIC/CESCI meeting at Tanguy Homesteads in Pennsylvania, also attended by: Herb Goldstein of Common Ground, VA, School of Living (SoL), Inter-Communities of Virginia (I-CV), and Community Educational Service Council (CESCI); Harvey Baker of Dunmire Hollow, TN; Allen Butcher of Twin Oaks, VA; representatives from the Camphill Village communities; and others. Charles announced that he would incorporate the FIC autumn of that year at Stelle, asking for interested persons to attend and form a board-of-directors. Allen suggested to Laird Schaub of Sandhill Farm, MO and the FEC that the Federation support the new FIC, and invited Dan Questenberry of Shannon Farm, VA and the newly reestablished I-CV, first active in the late 1960s and early '70s, to also support the new continental community networking initiative.

Five people attended the autumn of 1986 FIC incorporation meeting at Stelle and signed on as incorporators of the renewed FIC: Charles Betterton of Stelle Community; Allen Butcher of Twin Oaks Community, the School of Living, and I-CV; Laird Schaub of Sandhill Community and the FEC; Dan Questenberry of Shannon Farm in Virginia and I-CV; and Donald Pitzer of NHCSA and the Center for Communal Studies (CCS) at the University of Southern Indiana. One more FIC meeting was held at Stelle (spring 1987) before the Fellowship board was to go on the road, scheduling meetings to be hosted by different intentional communities. Charles Betterton soon dropped out of the FIC, later joining an Emissary community in Indiana called Oakwood Farm, and a four-person FIC administrative committee was created in his place.

At the 1988 Green Pastures, NH meeting a set of "Community Visit Report Guidelines" was created for FIC board members to make written reports of communities they visited as representatives of the FIC, with the intent of writing the report to be communicated to the group prior to the visit, assuring their right to review and respond.

Larid Schaub of Sandhill Farm invited a number of community activists to the FIC board-of-directors, including Geoph Kozeny of Purple Rose/Stardance in San Francisco, Caroline Estes of Alpha Farm in Oregon, and Betty Didcoct of Linnea/Turtle Island Earth Stewards in Washington state, all three of whom had been active in the West Coast regional Earth Communities Network (ECN).

Caroline Estes was a group-process trainer and consensus facilitator, Betty Didcoct lived in and was active in the community land trust movement, and Geoph Kozeny became the lead organizer for the "1990/91 Communities Directory," and created a two-DVD set of videos about intentional communities he had visited, titled "Visions of Utopia." The first volume published in 2004 presents an historical overview of intentional communities with profiles of seven contemporary groups, and the second volume published posthumously in 2009 by the FIC presents eleven more contemporary intentional communities.

Charles Betterton had taken out a CESCI loan to fund his publishing of Communities magazine, and was now in default since the publication could not obtain a sufficient circulation of paid subscriptions. By 1989 the FIC wanted to publish a new directory of intentional communities, since directories typically generated a positive cash-flow, yet did not have the money. At a CESCI board meeting Allen Butcher proposed making another loan to the FIC to print a directory. As soon as the proposal was approved, Dan Questenberry exploded with an incredulous expression of the group’s total lack of respect for orthodox business sense in our pouring of more money into something that had already lost a couple thousand dollars. Herb Goldstein’s smile at Dan’s faked protest expressed the sentiment that the group was doing absolutely what needed to be done. The FIC printed a succession of directories: 1990/91, 1995, 2000, 2005, 2007, 2010, and 2016, all of which generated a positive cash-flow.

Gradually the FIC took on more and more movement activities, including publishing Communities magazine. Charles Betterton and staff at Stelle and elsewhere produced the magazine for eight years, until the FIC agreed to take it on, with Laird Sandhill serving as the Managing Editor, beginning with the fall/winter 1992 issue number 79.

The FIC organized a six-day, national conference called the "Celebration of Community" at Evergreen State College in Olympia, Washington in August 1993, attended by about 800 people. The Celebration offered panel discussions, 160 workshops, and nine plenary presenters: Caroline Estes, Kirkpatrick Sale, Dorothy Maclean, Debra Lynn Dadd-Redalia, Corine McLaughlin, Gordon Davidson, Dr. Noel Brown, Patch Adams MD, and Catherine Burton. The event did a little better than break even.

In 1994 Elph Morgan (unrelated to the CSI Morgans) of the FIC acquired an Internet domain name, at IC.org, when it was still possible to get a two-letter domain. Along with "Communities Directory" book sales, the FIC created in 2004 an online, free, searchable database of intentional communities, supported by selling advertising on the website.

The FIC also took on management of the CESCI revolving loan fund, and took on the FEC's Community Bookstore, selling books online and at conferences of various community organizations. In 1997 the FIC began conducting a series of "Art of Community" weekend educational and networking gatherings.

Around 1990 a growing trend emerged of communities sharing privately owned property, especially cohousing communities using the condominium legal structure, which comprised about one-third of all the groups in the 2010 "Communities Directory." Another form of community sharing private property is those in which the land is owned by one person, a couple, or a small group of members with others as renters. Data analysis of the 2010 "Communities Directory" shows that twenty-percent of the listings were of this type, with the largest example being Ganas Community on Staten Island, NY. A name in use for this type of community is "class-harmony community," indicating that the group has both an owner class and a renter class.

Over the years there were many people who were part of the FIC's Administrative Committee, the Executive Committee, the Oversight Committee, the Board-of-Directors, and many work groups. Faith Morgan served on many of them, as did her mother Jane Morgan before her. Faith commented that she had been attending FIC meetings since she was a child.

Many serving the Fellowship were from Federation communities, both current and former members. Laird Sandhill wrote … "After a long run (28 years before the masthead [note: since 1987]) I stepped down as FIC’s main administrator at the end of 2015, and retired from active involvement in the organization …"

The definition of "intentional community" was first established in 1949 and presented in the following section on the First Fellowship as: "Location – The group should share land and housing or be other-wise close enough together geographically to be in continuous active fellowship and be able to work out effectively the total way of life to which they are dedicated."

For many years there had been various efforts to form some type of formal working relationship between the FIC and various newly arising ecovillage networks and other related organizations. In 2018 six organizations formed the GENNA Alliance. The name comes from the Global Ecovillage Network – North America (GENNA), involving an ongoing network of about twenty networkers.

"We envision a world of interdependent cooperative communities stewarding the conditions of regeneration, justice, peace, and abundance, in order to realize the full potential of flourishing for all life, for all generations to come." – GENNA Alliance

=== 1949 – 1986 ===
The founding of the original Fellowship of Intentional Communities (FIC or First Fellowship) was inspired by Arthur Morgan. While Morgan was preoccupied with other endeavors, his son Gris along with Al Andersen and Art Wiser took on the development of the organization.

Arthur Morgan (1878-1975) served a term as the vice president of the American Unitarian Association, was the first president of the Progressive Education Association, and vice president of the American Society of Civil Engineers. Morgan was appointed by Franklin Roosevelt as the first chairman of the Tennessee Valley Authority.

Morgan created an association for the advancement of the small village-like community through which he believed that people could best enjoy "good will and mutual confidence [as] the very life-principle of society." Community Service, Inc. was created in 1940 to advocate for the resurgence of the idealistic small-town family life, while the 1949 Fellowship of Intentional Communities was created as an association of the full range of communitarian societies, including: secular or religious communities, communal societies, co-operative communities, and other groups, including what later became called community land trusts (CLTs). Before those two associations were begun Arthur Morgan had already created Celo Community, a large and successful community land trust, although that term was not in use at the time.

Celo Community was founded in 1936 at Burnesville, North Carolina, and a significant source of support and of members for the forming of Celo came from the Quaker social service organization called the American Friends Service Committee (AFSC), and other anti-war pacifists. Financing for the 1,250-acre land purchase came from a wealthy Chicago industrialist. William Regnery believed in the ideal expressed in earlier times of the "Roman citizen-soldier" and of the "Jeffersonian landed yeomanry" as the foundation of a democratic republic. The form Celo was to take was that created by Ralph Borsodi (1886-1977) who founded the School of Living, advocating the community design of homesteads leased from a nonprofit association that owns the land. Because of this land tenure design, and the longevity of Celo Community, Celo is considered to be the first community land trust, although more often New Communities Inc. of Albany, Georgia founded in 1969 is called the first CLT.

Arthur Morgan had two sons, Ernest (1906-2001) and Griscom (1912-1993). Ernest and his wife Elizabeth lived at Celo in North Carolina. Gris and his wife Jane founded The Vale community in 1946 on forty acres, two miles south of Yellow Springs, Ohio. The Vale incorporated in 1960, and in 1980 the land was donated to the Community Service, Inc. Land Trust, growing to eleven families or about twenty people, some of Quaker orientation, along with some Community Service, Inc. (CSI) assistants and Antioch College students in residence.

Gris and Jane had two children, Faith who was active on the boards of CSI, FIC, and CESCI, and John who lives at Raven Rocks community, founded in 1970 near Beallsville, Ohio. Raven Rocks was described in the fall 2015 issue number 168 of Communities magazine (p. 53) as having been purchased "to protect 850 acres of Appalachian forest and ravines from strip mining," and in the winter 1993 issue number 79 of Communities magazine (p. 12) as having its own concrete business for building passive solar, earth bermed or underground houses.

Arthur Morgan founded Community Service, Inc. (CSI) in 1940, and a description of Morgan’s intention for CSI is printed in a quote in Mildred Loomis’ book Alternative Americas, although she does not credit the source.

"Community Service undertakes to increase knowledge of community life and the concern for it. Those who see the limiting and depressing qualities of small community life seldom have the vision of what a good community can be, how it can meet the fundamental needs and cravings of a human spirit. Community Service seeks to clarify a vision of community and to help many people to share it, so that work for community betterment shall not consist of patchwork efforts, but shall lead to the fulfillment of a truly great concept of community life."Author unknown

The anonymous quote above shows that Community Service has a unique orientation to the communities movement, somewhat closer to the small town or Transition Town "circumstantial community" than to the more deliberate intentional community like The Vale. Richard Fairfield, who traveled among and wrote about intentional communities in the 1960s, noted the difference from reading the CSI newsletter saying, "I felt that the ideas it expressed were very much out of touch with the newly developing movement."

Robert Fogarty, a professor at Antioch College in Yellow Springs, OH, was very familiar with the Morgans and CSI, although in his 1972 book American Utopianism he does not mention them, while describing the 1960s-‘70s era communities movement as follows.

"Since the mid-sixties there has been a dramatic resurgence of interest in communitarianism. A revolt against the Vietnam War and a technocratic society coupled with a widespread use of drugs combined to produce dropouts who sought an alternative culture. There is no single coherent philosophy – as with [19th century] Owenism or Fourierism – but an amalgam of attitudes and ideas that are pacific and egalitarian."

While the mission of Community Service, Inc. was primarily for the promotion of family life in small towns, Timothy Miller states that, "Morgan’s interests had always included communal settlements." This can be seen in the programs which soon grew out of CSI. While Arthur Morgan promoted small-town life in regular conferences at Yellow Springs, a person in attendance who was associated with Tanguy Homesteads in Pennsylvania, Alfred Andersen, recommended that CSI expand or change its scope to include communitarian groups.

Alfred Andersen explains in an article in the winter ‘97 issue of Communities magazine (#97), titled "Fellowship Roots," that while he was in prison serving time as a conscientious objector to military service during World War Two, his wife Dorothy and their son lived at Tanguy Homesteads in Glen Mills, PA, and that soon after his release the three, … "headed for Yellow Springs, Ohio, to renew my acquaintance with Arthur Morgan … to help Arthur and Griscom Morgan’s work at Community Service, Inc. While doing research in the communities movement I had come across descriptions of the scattered and struggling "cooperative" communities, so I suggested that Community Service host representatives to a gathering in Yellow Springs following its annual Small Community Conference."

The implementation of Andersen’s suggestion resulted in a sufficiently successful event that Community Service, Inc. then formed an association during 1946 and ‘47, for the barter exchanges of agricultural products and crafts between communitarian settlements called, "Inter-Community Exchange" (I-CE). Other types of exchanges and mutual aid facilitated at least in part with the help of the I-CE are presented in CSI’s 1988 Guidebook for Intentional Communities. These include the Highlander Folk School taking on Koinonia’s summer camp when the latter community was being attacked by the Ku Klux Klan, and The Vale giving its own water supply pump system to the newly immigrated Bruderhof, when the town of Yellow Springs provided access to city water for The Vale. Tim Miller writes that through these exchanges, and through meeting representatives of other communities at CSI meetings and conferences, some members of various communities began expressing interest in visiting some of the communities in the network being created by CSI.

In his 1997 Communities magazine article Andersen explains the vision and the contrary reality of Inter-Communities Exchange. … "Our hope was that we could develop an entire alternative economy of trading among cooperative communities. … It was only after a year or two that we realized the main thing we had to exchange was fellowship."

In the 1988 Community Service, Inc. publication titled, Guidebook for Intentional Communities, revised from the earlier 1978 CSI publication titled, An Intentional Community Handbook, Gris Morgan edited an article titled, "Some Basic Concepts for Intentional Communities," saying that at the 1949 Community Service Conference attended by sixty people from four continents, a subgroup was delegated the task of "defining and naming the common subject of shared interest."

The term "intentional" was chosen to emphasize the basic characteristic of intent, purpose and commitment. Other words such as "cooperative," "experimental" or "utopian" lacked that connotation.

The date of the founding of the new organization is sometimes given as 1948, such as in Dan Questenberry’s 1990 article, "Residential Land Trust Organizing," in the 1990/91 Directory of Intentional Communities, although in Gris Morgan’s and CSI’s 1988 Guidebook the event that took place in ‘48 is referred to as a "pre-organizational meeting," with the official founding of the Fellowship being in 1949, after a year of community networking. It was in that year that the term "intentional" was used for the new name of the repurposed Inter-Communities Exchange.

The term "exchange" had been used extensively during the Great Depression to refer to many different, and often very large urban labor exchanges, some operating production facilities and businesses without the use of money. Today, similar although usually smaller exchanges are often called "Mutual Aid Networks."

At the 1949 Community Service Conference the Inter-Communities Exchange then became the "Fellowship of Intentional Communities" (FIC). Timothy Miller gives Art Wiser, a member of the Macedonia community in Georgia which later joined the Bruderhof network of communities, much of the credit for evolving the Inter-Community Exchange into the FIC.

Gris Morgan explains in the Guidebook article that meetings of the Fellowship of Intentional Communities were held around the Mid-Western and Mid-Atlantic States at locations including: Antioch College’s Outdoor Education Center called Glen Helen, the Highlander Folk School in Kentucky; and the Pendle Hill Quaker Center in Pennsylvania. The extent of the Fellowship can be somewhat gauged by the report in the March 1960 Fellowship newsletter that during the previous October a 250-piece mailing was sent out asking for contributions to the newsletter, with replies received from 125 individuals and five communities in twenty-eight states, Canada, Mexico, Holland, and India.

Also in the March 1960 FIC newsletter, Griscom Morgan explains that in 1959 he conducted an outreach effort to a number of different Native American tribes.

"I visited with tribal leaders of six tribes, as well as talking among a number of others, exploring their interest in fellowship with non-Indians holding some of the same values and concerns in intentional community, land-holding, and mutual respect between cultures. Some of the Indians were keenly interested, saying that this was the kind of fellowship that would make possible the opening [of] the door of deeper contact as compared with the strained relationship with the prying, curious, or "scientific" … Some of these were younger men who are now deeply fired with the challenge of bearing the Indians’ "testimony" in the world … So the leading older traditionals are not the only ones who are vigorously bearing the Indian heritage.

"… some of our intentional communities … might do well to cultivate fellowship with some of the tribal groups, to reinforce each other in our distinctive ways, to learn from each other, and to help each other from our diverse assets of competence and circumstance. For example, the Cherokee of North Carolina have a form of landholding similar to that at Celo. Each has difficulties in maintaining it and is surrounded by another culture. … Similarly, among some tribes and Pueblos, the traditional reliance upon "sense of the meeting" as compared with voting is under attack by those who assume that the conventional reliance upon voting is the only way of conducting a meeting democratically. We could strengthen these people by our contact and fellowship with them and they could do the same to us."

A list of nineteen communities in the U.S. associated with the Fellowship of Intentional Communities in its first decade includes: Bruderhof, Rifton, NY; Bryn Gweled, Clarksville, PA; Canterbury, Concord, NH [Quaker group that acquired land from the Canterbury Shakers]; Celo, Burnsville, NC; Gould Farm, Great Barrington, MA; Hidden Springs, Neshanic Station, NJ; Kingwood, Frenchtown, NJ; Koinonia Farm, Americus, GA; Macedonia, Clarksville, GA; May Valley [later Teramanto], Renton, WA; Parishfield, Brighton, MI; Pendle Hill, Wallingford, PA; Powelton Village, [location of one of the MOVE houses in University City] Philadelphia, PA; Quest, Royal Oak, MI; Skyview Acres, Pomona, NY; St. Francis Acres [with the Libertarian Press, printing Cooperative Living newsletter], Glen Gardner, NJ; Tanguy Homesteads, West Chester, PA; The Vale, Yellow Springs, OH; and Tuolumne Co-operative Farms, Modesto, CA. Other intentional communities attended Fellowship events over the decades.

Timothy Miller explains that this network of communitarian groups included "fully communal" societies, along with economically-diverse communities like community land trusts "in which family finances were largely private" while the land is owned in common. Some of the FIC-associated communities were secular, many of them were religious groups, and some were multi-faith. While some of the religious-identified communities were composed of members with mainline or liberal Protestant backgrounds, the primary denomination represented was Quaker.

Along with inventing a term for describing their gifting and sharing lifestyles, the original or First Fellowship also defined what they meant by the term "intentional community," identifying the basic aspects of communitarian theory and organization. This material was first printed by Community Service, Inc. in The Intentional Communities 1959 Yearbook and Newsletter, later in CSI’s An Intentional Community Handbook printed in 1978, and then in CSI’s Guidebook for Intentional Communities published in 1988, which Robert Fogarty then presented in his 1972 book, American Utopianism. The following is edited from these sources:

- Size – minimum size should be three families or five adults.
- Organization – The group should be sufficiently organized to be a recognizable social entity acting with responsibility and effectiveness.
- Location – The group should share land and housing or be other-wise close enough together geographically to be in continuous active fellowship and be able to work out effectively the total way of life to which they are dedicated.

Robert Fogarty presents a list of seven "basic concepts" and six "principles" of "each of the communities belonging to the Fellowship." For a sampling:

1. Community means mutuality and sharing in a whole way of life, in all its values and all its responsibilities.

2. The essence of community is spiritual, that is, the feeling of mutuality, the practice of mutual respect, love and understanding. No physical forms or practices will create community, but forms, methods and practices will grow out of the spirit. …

It was during the 1954 Fellowship meeting at the Quaker community at Pendle Hill in Philadelphia that a gift of $30,000 was made to the FIC to set up a revolving loan fund to aid intentional communities. The Homer Morris Fund was named after the person who contributed or acquired most of the initial seed money. Homer Morris had been active in the Quaker charity organization, the American Friends Service Committee, aiding the development of the AFSC’s Depression era unemployed resettlement colonies.

One of the resettlement colonies was Penn-Craft near Uniontown, Pennsylvania, begun in 1937. "Craft" in the name of the colony refers to the Craft family farm which was acquired for the community. Much of the money for starting Penn-Craft was donated by the U.S. Steel Corp. which had reduced its mining operations in the area, resulting in a rising local unemployment rate. Two members of the near-by Division of Subsistence Homesteads colony, named "Norvelt", left their government project to help build Penn-Craft. It had fifty home sites on two-hundred acres, with a cooperative store, the beginnings of a business in the form of a "knitting mill," and many social service activities. Penn-Craft was so successful that adjacent land was acquired in 1946 for an additional fifteen homesteads.

Gris Morgan coordinated the Homer Morris Fund for many years, and unfortunately the fund dwindled rather than grew. $2,500 loaned to the Toe Valley News, a newspaper serving the area around Celo Community, was reported delinquent in the March 1960 FIC newsletter, after the Toe Valley News went out of business.

When tax-exempt status was acquired from the IRS in 1975, the Homer Morris Fund’s name was changed to the Community Educational Service Council, Inc (CESCI), emphasizing its primary intent of education and service, with its most active board members residing at Tanguy Homesteads, most notably Rubin Close who served as incorporator when the Fund received its tax-exemption. While a number of the Fund’s loans were never repaid, Dan Questenberry reports that the fund completed its 100th "community business loan" about 1990, slowly rebuilding its assets back up to and over its original endowment. From 1975 to when CESCI was acquired by the 2nd Fellowship, the Fellowship and CESCI held combined weekend meetings, with the technical CESCI business meetings held on Sunday morning after the Fellowship's social events held Saturday evening.

Beginning in 1960 there was very little Fellowship activity; the FIC being reduced to a social event accompanying the meetings of the Homer Morris Fund, incorporated as the Community Educational Service Council (CESCI) in 1975. A list of some of the communities which borrowed money from CESCI, compiled from CESCI records prior to 1990, include: Association of Light Morning, VA; Down Hill Farm, PA; East Wind, MO; Heathcote Center, MD; Plow Creek Fellowship, IL; Twin Oaks, VA; and Walden Three, RI. CESCI has also aided several community-oriented publications which evidenced its educational aspect, including: The Community Market Catalog; Source Catalog; Communities; and Mark Satin’s New Options.

Around the year 2000 CESCI became a project of the Second Fellowship, yet the small size of the fund could not justify the labor involved in its management, and so it was eventually merged with the larger revolving-loan fund managed by the egalitarian communities called PEACH, begun as a self-insurance fund separate from the Federation of Egalitarian Communities.

== See also ==
- Ecovillage
- Intentional community
- North American Students of Cooperation

== Sources ==
- Andersen, Alfred (August 9, 1975), What is The Fellowship of Intentional Communities West? (Mailing to the membership of the Fellowship of Intentional Communities)
- Andersen, Alfred (November 22, 1991), Discussion of the early Fellowship of Intentional Communities (Message posted to Quest online forum. Archive unavailable)
- Andersen, Alfred (Winter 1997). "Fellowship Roots: Where We've Been; Where We Might Go". Communities: Journal of Cooperative Living. No. 97. pp. 12–16.
- Christian, Diana Leafe (2003). Creating a life together : practical tools to grow ecovillages and intentional communities. Gabriola Island, BC: New Society Publishers. ISBN 9781550923162. OCLC 232159819.
- de Graaf, John (Fall 1977). "The Wandervogel". The CoEvolution Quarterly. pp. 14–21.
- Didcoct, Betty, ed. (Summer 1994). "Celebration of Community". Communities: Journal of Cooperative Living. No. 83. Fort Collins, CO: Fellowship for Intentional Community.
- Fairfield, Richard (1971). Communes USA; a Personal Tour. Penguin books. Penguin Books. ISBN 978-0-14-003489-9.
- Foundation for Intentional Community (2016). Communities Directory : the guide to intentional communities and cooperative living. Rutledge, Missouri: Foundation for Intentional Community. ISBN 9780971826496. OCLC 967852447.
- FIC 2020 Annual report (Report). Evansville, IN: Foundation for Intentional Community. 2020.
- 2021 Annual report: Cultivating community, inspiring communitarians (Report). Rutledge, MO: Foundation for Intentional Community. 2021.
- 2022 Annual report: Together we can do so much (Report). Rutledge, MO: Foundation for Intentional Community. 2022.
- Fogarty, R.S. (1972). American Utopianism. Primary sources in American history. F. E. Peacock.
- Huntington, Gertrude Enders (1997). "Living in the Ark: Four Centuries of Hutterite Faith and Community". In Donald E. Pitzer (ed.). America's Communal Utopias. Chapel Hill, NC: University of North Carolina Press. pp. 319–351. ISBN 978-0-8078-4609-4.
- Loomis, Mildred (1980). Alternative Americas. New York: Universe Books.
- Lynd, Staughton (August 24, 1994). Keep In Touch Newsletter. Vol. VI. San Francisco, CA: KIT Information Service, Peregrine Foundation. p. 2.
- McLaughlin, Corinne; Davidson, Gordon (1985). Builders of the dawn : community lifestyles in a changing world. Shutesbury, MA, US: Stillpoint Pub. ISBN 9780940267015. OCLC 681460208.
- Miller, Timothy (1998). The quest for utopia in twentieth-century America. Vol. I: 1900-1960. Syracuse, NY: Syracuse University Press.
- Morgan, Arthur (1942). The small community: Foundation of democratic life. Yellow Springs, Ohio: Community Service, Inc.
- Morgan, Ernest. (February 25, 1988b). "Letter to Dan Christenberry, a.k.a. Questenberry". Letter to.
- Morgan, Griscom (March 1960). Fellowship of intentional communities newsletter. Yellow Springs, Ohio: Community Service, Inc.
- Morgan, Griscom, ed. (1988a). Guidebook for intentional communities (Revised edition of the 1978 An intentional community handbook ed.). Yellow Springs, OH: Community Service, Inc.
- Morgan, Jane; Crumrine, Betty (May–June 1984). "Fellowship of Intentional Communities: Report of the conference held at Barnesville, Ohio, April 13–15, 1984". Community Service Newsletter. Vol. XXXII, no. 3. Yellow Springs, OH: Community Service.
- Morris, James; Kross, Andrea L (2009). The A to Z of utopianism. Lanham: Scarecrow Press. ISBN 9780810863354. OCLC 435767628.
- Oved, Yaacov (1988). Two hundred years of American communes. New Brunswick, NJ: Transaction Books.
- Questenberry, Dan (1990). "Residential land trust organizing.". 1990/91 Directory of intentional communities: A guide to cooperative living. Evansville, IN and Stelle, IL: Fellowship for Intentional Community and Communities Publications Cooperative.
- Ringrose, I.; Brown, B. (1990–1991). "Regional Organizing: InterCommunities of Virginia". 1990/91 Directory of intentional communities: A guide to cooperative living. Evansville, IN and Stelle, IL: Fellowship for Intentional Community and Communities Publications Cooperative.
- Schaub, Laird (Fall–Winter 1992). "We're Back!". Communities: Journal of Cooperative Living. No. 79. Rutledge, MO: Fellowship for Intentional Community.
- Schaub, Laird (Fall 2015). "Sky's the limit". Communities: Life in Cooperative Culture. No. 168. Rutledge, MO: Fellowship for Intentional Community.
- Schaub, Laird (Winter 2022). "Cmag and Me". Communities: Life in Cooperative Culture. No. 197. Denver, CO: Global Ecovillage Network – United States.
- Society of Brothers (1973). Children in Community (2nd ed.). Rifton, NY: Plough Publishing House of The Woodcrest Service Committee, Inc.
- Sreenivasan, Jyotsna (2008). Utopias in American history. Santa Barbara, Calif: ABC-CLIO. ISBN 9781598840520. OCLC 469879708.
- Tina, Cynthia (Fall 2018). "Leading edges of collaboration: GENNA Alliance". Communities: Life in Cooperative Culture. No. 180. Rutledge, MO: Fellowship for Intentional Community.
- Tina, Cynthia (Summer 2019). "Introducing the New FIC". Communities: Life in Cooperative Culture. No. 183. Rutledge, MO: Fellowship for Intentional Community.
- Veysey, Laurence R. (1973). The Communal Experience; anarchist and mystical counter-cultures in America. New York: Harper & Row. ISBN 9780060145019. OCLC 1058619007.
