= Free Vermont =

Network of communes and collectives

Free Vermont was a network of communes and collectives throughout the state of Vermont. It existed from the late 1960s through the mid-1970s. It encompassed over a dozen communes and hundreds of people. They put out their own newspaper called "Free Vermont!" and they had their own flag. They laid the groundwork for food co-ops, health clinics, free schools, organic farms, and alternative institutions throughout Vermont. Some of the Free Vermont initiators were members of the radical film group "Newsreel".

Some Free Vermont collective members helped to create and promote the Liberty Union Party which launched the career of Vermont senator Bernie Sanders.

== See also ==
- Back-to-the-land movement
