= Moora Moora =

Coordinates: 37°43′18″S 145°34′3″E

Moora Moora is a co-operative residential community made up of a diverse group of about 50 adults and 20 children organised into six small hamlets located on a co-operatively owned 245 hectare (600 acre) property situated at an altitude of 700 metres (2400 ft) on Mount Toolebewong.

The community is situated near the township of Healesville (Victoria, Australia), approximately 67 km (90 minutes by car) east of the city of Melbourne. The co-operative hosts visitor days for prospective members on the first Sunday of each month.
