= Mount Toolebewong =

- Town
- Country: Australia
- State: Victoria
- LGA: Shire of Yarra Ranges

Government
  - State electorate: Eildon
  - Federal division: McEwen

Population
  - Total: 119 (2021 census)
- Postcode: 3777

Mount Toolebewong is a locality in Victoria, Australia 65 kilometres north-east of Melbourne, located within the Shire of Yarra Ranges local government area. Mount Toolebewong recorded a population of 119 at the 2021 census.

Mount Toolebewong is located south of Healesville. The summit of the mountain is 750m above sea level.

The locality is home to one of Australia's oldest intentional communities, Moora Moora Community Cooperative.

‘Toolebewong' is a Wurundjeri place name from the Woiwurrung language meaning ‘Where the raven sat on a tree’.
