= Kath Scanlon =

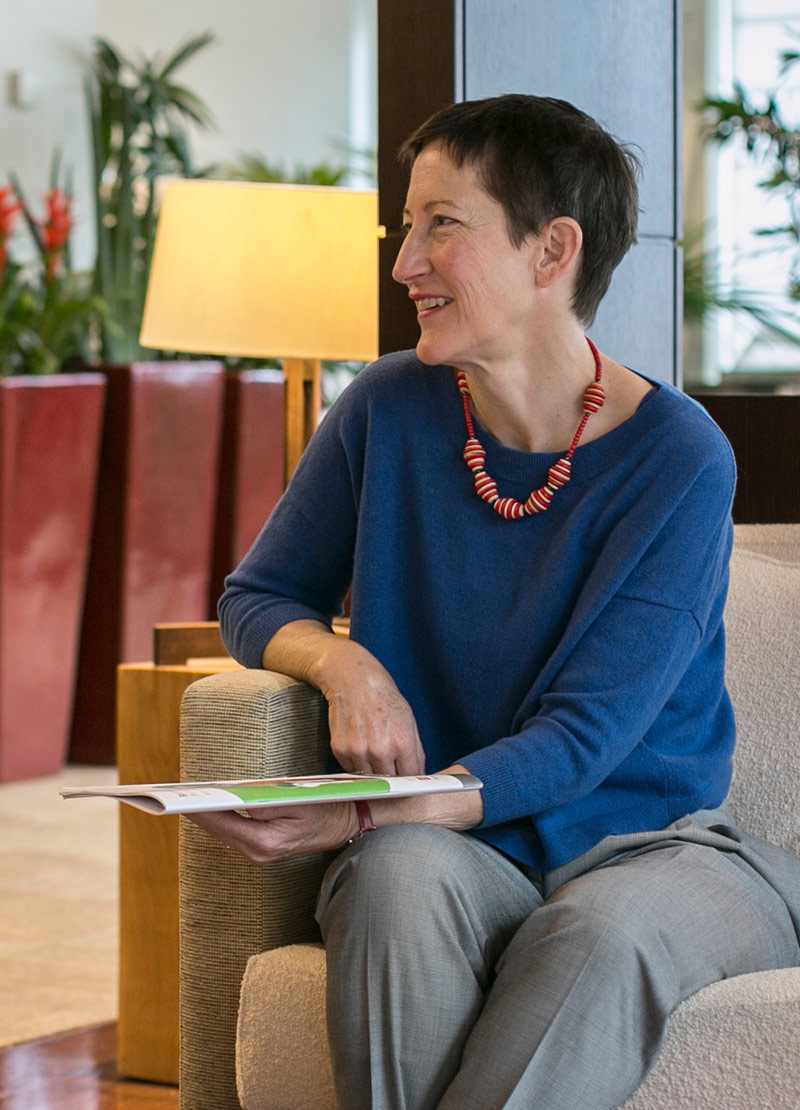
Kath Scanlon

Kathleen "Kath" Juanita Scanlon is a Distinguished Policy Fellow and Deputy Director of LSE London, a research urban group based at London School of Economics and Political Science.

== Biography ==
After graduating in Spanish Literature in 1980 at Stanford University in California, Kath Scanlon earned a MSc in Regional and Urban Planning Studies at London School of Economics and Political Science in 1992, with a dissertation on the economics of listed buildings.

From 1993 until 1995, she was the principal policy officer at London Boroughs Association and then she became a research associate for the Cambridge Centre for Housing and Planning Research at the University of Cambridge until 2010.

Kath Scanlon collaborated with several national and international organisations such as the Council of Europe Development Bank (CEB) and the Inter-American Development Bank.

== Research and publications ==
Kath Scanlon's research interests include migration, comparative housing policy and mortgage finance.

Her research spans from economics to geography and sociology. Her policy-related publications focus on social and affordable housing policy; cohousing, community-led housing; London housing market and housing supply; effects of housing policies on local residents; London governance and economy.

In 2014 she wrote the book "Social Housing in Europe". She is co-author of the report launched in March 2020 "Living in a denser London: How residents see their homes". In 2019, she also co-edited the policy-reports "The Cost of Homelessness Services in London" and "Barriers to acceptance of housing offers by families in temporary accommodation"
