= European Council of Autistic People =

European group of autism rights organizations

- Abbreviation: EUCAP
- Founded: 2019
- Legal status: Non-profit
- Headquarters: Ječná 545/19, 120 00 Prague 2, Czech Republic
- Region served: Europe
- Secretary General: Viera Hincová
- President: Heta Pukki
- Vice President: Sara Rocha
- Treasurer: Silke Rudolph
- Board of directors: Imke Heuer; Reetta Viljanen; Martijn Dekker; Kabie Brooks; Adela Santos; Jo Minchin; Myria Tsiakkirou
- Affiliations: European Disability Forum; European Network on Independent Living
- Budget: €43,000 EUR (2024)
- Website: eucap.eu

European Council of Autistic People (EUCAP) is an umbrella organization of autistic-led advocacy and rights organizations from European countries. The organization has 16 full members and 11 associate members.

== History ==
EUCAP was founded in October 2019.

Heta Pukki became president of EUCAP in late 2019. Pukki, who is autistic and has a visual impairment, also serves on the Finnish Advisory Board for the Rights of Persons with Disabilities and on the boards of Autscape and Suomen Autismikirjon Yhdistys.

On 12 November 2020, EUCAP provided feedback to the European Commission on their Disability Rights Strategy for 2021–2030.

Alongside member organizations Autistic Mutual Aid Society Edinburgh (AMASE), Autism Rights Group Highland (ARGH) Scotland, and the National Autistic Taskforce, EUCAP signed onto the "Scottish Government (2022) Coming Home Implementation: A Report from the Working Group on Complex Care and Delayed Discharge."

In 2024, EUCAP collaborated with the European Union, Erasmus+, ImpactSci and national stakeholders on the Autistic Community through Advocacy, Learning, and Empowerment (ACTIVATE) Project.

In 2026, the organization has 16 full members and 11 associate members.

On April 8, 2026, EUCAP joined the ENIL, Inclusion Europe, EDF, Mental Health Europe, Validity Foundation – Mental Disability Advocacy Centre, and AGE Platform Europe to express their concerns that the European Commission's 2023 draft of the "Regulation on Protection of Adults in Cross-Border Situations" violated the UN Convention on the Rights of Persons with Disabilities (UNCRPD) and the European Council "Conclusions on the Protection of Vulnerable Adults across the European Union." The regulation is based on the Hague Protection of Adults Convention, a convention that many autistic rights and disability justice organizations believe violates the UNCRPD. The European Economic and Social Committee also raised issue with reliance on the Hague Convention rather than the UNCRPD in the regulation. The UN special rapporteur on people with disabilities and the Independent Expert on the enjoyment of all human rights by older persons released a similar statement to the disability umbrella organizations, writing "there is a real risk that, if enacted as proposed, the Regulation and Decision will only be used to freeze into place an outdated policy response to disability and the needs of older persons. And there is a real risk that, if enacted as proposed, the Regulation and Decision will only attract needless legal liability in the international legal order for the EU and its Member States."

== Selected projects ==
=== NeuroDem ===
NeuroDem, short for "Empowering Neurodivergent Youth to act as Changemakers for Inclusive Democratic Advocacy and Innovation," began on March 1, 2025, and plans to go until February 28, 2027. The project covers the Czech Republic, Germany, Greece, Romania, and Slovakia.

The project is run by EUCAP, A centrum, Group of the European Youth for Change (GEYC), Verein zur sozialen und beruflichen Integration, and Stimmuli for social change. NeuroDem received €250,000 in funding from the European Union and Erasmus+.

=== ACTIVATE Project ===
ACTIVATE Project is an online campaign and training academy focused on empowering autistic youth to self-advocate, engage in community practice and social activism. The pilot of the Autistic Advocacy Academy, "a tailored training programme that builds capacity in self-advocacy, digital campaigning, community engagement and policy influence", ran in February and March 2026. In late 2026, structured stakeholder workshops with policymakers and autistic youth will be held. A digital advocacy campaign, #MyAutismJourney, is held alongside the project.

The project is run by EUCAP, Malta's Directorate for Disability Issues, Associação Portuguesa Voz Do Autista, ImpactSci, Malta's Commission for the Rights of Persons with Disability, and KU Leuven. The ACTIVATE Project is funded by the European Union.

== Memberships ==
EUCAP is a member of the European Disability Forum and the European Network on Independent Living.

== Partnerships ==
- Autism-Europe
- Erasmus+
- Estonian Chamber of People with Disabilities
- Estonian Foundation of People with Disabilities
- Guerrilla Foundation
- GEYC
- ImpactSci
- KU Leuven
- Lithuanian Agency for Rights of People with Disabilities
- Malta Directorate for Disability Issues
- Malta's Commission for the Rights of Persons with Disability
- Ministry of Social Affairs and Labor of Lithuania
- Stimmuli for social change
- Verein zur sozialen und beruflichen Integration

== Members ==
=== Full members ===
- Adventor (Czech Republic)
- Aspies e.V. (Germany)
- Associação Portuguesa Voz do Autista (Portugal)
- Associazione Neuro-Peculiar (Italy)
- Autismeforeningen (Denmark)
- Autistic Mutual Aid Society Edinburgh (Scotland)
- ARGH Scotland
- Autistic UK
- Autscape Organisation (UK)
- autSocial e.V. (Germany)
- Comité para la Promoción y Apoyo de las niñas y Mujeres Autistas (CEPAMA) (Spain)
- Lees en Adviesgroep van Volwassenen met Autisme (LAVA) (Belgium)
- MTÜ Autistid (Estonia)
- Organiserade Autister (Sweden)
- PAS Nederland
- Suomen Autismikirjon Yhdistys (Finland)

=== Associate members ===
- A Centrum (Slovakia)
- Asociația suntAutist (Romania)
- AutAngel (UK)
- Autisme Digitaal (Netherlands)
- Autisme Ungdom (Denmark)
- Autistic Persons Working Group of the Autism Advisory Council (Malta)
- Autminds (Netherlands)
- Cle Autistes (France)
- National Autistic Taskforce (UK)
- Udruga za autizam i ostale neurodivergentnosti, samozastupanje i kulturu različitosti (ASK) (Croatia)
- Jasna Strona Spektrum (Poland)

== See also ==
- Disability rights movement
- Societal and cultural aspects of autism
- List of autism organizations
