= Michael Baron =

British solicitor and autism advocate

Michael Geoffrey Baron MBE (25 December 1928 – 16 November 2025) was a solicitor and autism advocate who would co-found the National Autistic Society in 1962 and serve as its first chair until 1967.

== Biography ==
Baron was born in Willesden in northwest London. He was educated at Westminster School before attending university at Trinity College, Cambridge to study history and would graduate in 1951.

He would meet Mie Wadsted, a Danish student, and be married to her from 1951 until their divorce in 1977. They would have three children including Timothy, who would grow up with autism, and journalist Saskia. Three years after his divorce, Baron would marry social worker Hetty Thieme who would die in 2012.

After selling his law firm and moving to the Lake District in 1990, Baron would become involved in campaigning against inadequate disposal of nuclear waste.

Long interested in poetry and literature he would help establish the Words by the Water literary festival in Keswick. Baron was involved in editing or co-editing several poetry anthologies including On a Bat’s Wing and The Night Shift and The Cockermouth Poets. He would also self-publish his own collection, More than a Man in a Boat, in 2005 and have his anthology The Gingko Tree and Other Poems commercially published in 2023.

=== Autism advocacy ===
Baron's son Timothy would grow up struggling with autism due to it not being well understood. Timothy would first be diagnosed with "childhood psychosis", but later become one of the first children in the UK diagnosed with autism. Baron's experiences would motivate him to help advocate for the redefining of how the condition was understood. Baron was involved with the development of what would become the National Autistic Society, among those who met in 1962 to establish an autism-specific charity. For this he would be awarded an MBE in 1980. In 1965, Baron would help to set up the world's first autism-specific school with premises in Ealing in west London. It was first led by Sybil Elgar for whom it is now named.

Baron was among the lawyers who campaigned to give disabled children the legal right to education through the Education (Handicapped Children) Act 1970. He would also be involved in the founding of what is considered the first residential community for autistic adults in the world near Bristol.

Baron would continue advocating for awareness and research into autism into his later life.
