= Habitat International Coalition =

Independent non-profit alliance

Official Habitat International Coalition logo

Habitat International Coalition (HIC) is an independent, nonprofit alliance with hundreds of organizations and individuals, which has been working in housing and human settlements for more than 30 years. The Coalition comprises social movements, community-based organizations, support groups and academics. The strength of the Coalition is based on its worldwide membership (it has members in 117 nations in five continents) and on the fact that it brings together a range of civil society groups. Dedicated to advocacy and support for the poor, solidarity networking, popular mobilization, debate and analysis, HIC works to unite civil society in a shared commitment to ensuring sustainable habitat and a livable planet for all. Its work focuses on defending and implementing the human rights linked to housing and habitat; i.e., land, housing, clean water, sanitation, a healthy environment, access to public goods and services (e.g., health, education, transport and recreation; access to livelihood and social protection, pluralism and the preservation of social, natural, historic and cultural patrimony.

Since the ’80 HIC has been developing special capacities seeking gender equality, in a balanced articulation between reflection and action on different issues: the rights’ approach, the right to the city, the social production of habitat, women and habitat and the sustainable habitat.

HIC specific work on the right to the city seeks to deepen the analysis and the actions on the proposal of building more just cities worldwide. HIC has been committed since decades in the creation of a theoretical and practical framework for the right to the city. The Coalition articulates and accompanies social movements and organizations in their struggle to achieve the realization of all human rights to ensure the collective well-being of inhabitants; the democratic management and the social function of the city. HIC is also aware of the global challenges facing worldwide on climate change and food sovereignty and the obvious impacts on the cities: the Coalition works on broaden exchanges between urban and rural movements.

HIC’S work on social production of habitat seeks to derive practical lessons from the compilation, exchange and analysis of “people’s processes” in initiating, designing, building and maintaining local environments. These experiences, which build upon local social resources and demonstrate local social reliance and ingenuity, generate and promote methods and strategies that then can be shared and replicated across regions. Each region has given rise to diverse and specific examples of struggles and efforts that emphasize distinct circumstances and priorities to construct people-centred livelihoods. In order to strengthen people's process for access and provision of land and shelter, lessons learned to date show a need to:

- understand what sustains the people’s process on land, housing and habitat/settlements development, in urban and rural areas,
- understand what are the forces, both external and internal, that strengthen or weaken peoples’ processes, including political and economic forces that have a bearing on people's processes, and in particular the dynamics of the informal and formal land markets;
- envision alternative ways to develop cities and other human settlements, evolving a bottom-up perspective on human settlement development without destroying livelihoods, assets and material achievements of the poor, while, quite to the contrary, supporting and nurturing livelihoods, assets and settlements of the poor, and their integration into the city;
- articulate and support the people’s processes through policies and actions for both government and nongovernmental organizations;
- develop more flexible design-based, knowledge-based and service-based housing policies and outputs with the objective of realizing the human right to adequate housing and equitable land use.

== History ==
The beginnings of the Habitat International Coalition refer to the United Nations Conference on Human Settlements in Vancouver in 1976. In this conference a committee was created and was further elaborated in the United Nations Conference on the Human Environment in Stockholm in 1972 and other global UN conferences. In 1976 the committee concluded and supported the necessity for there to be a constant NGO pressure on governments and international agencies to follow up their recommendations. Also in 1976, the UN Centre for Human Settlements (UN Habitat) was created and therefore the committee sought to create an organization that represented the NGO interests in this sphere named Habitat International Council. Initially HIC was made up of primarily of organizations from the North. In 1985 it was able to widen its membership to include global representation through a project that sought to document innovative ways to work with low-income groups and community organizations to improve housing conditions and the different ways that they pressured governments to resolve housing needs.

As part of the preparations for the UN International Year of Shelter for the Homeless in 1987, HIC members organized a conference in Limuru, Kenya that brought together representatives from over 40 NGOs from Africa, Asia and Latin America as well as many international NGOs. The discussions that took place therein gave way to a new HIC structure, culminating in a clear vision to fight for everyone's right to a secure place to live in peace and dignity.

== Members ==
1. Institute for Housing and Urban Development Studies (IHS)
2. International Council for Building Research Studies & Documentation

== See also ==
- Community-led housing
