= Kathryn McCamant =

American architect and author

- Born: 1959 (age 66–67); United States
- Occupation: Architect
- Awards: 2001 United Nations World Habitat Award, American Institute of Architects National Award for Mixed-use Development, 2011 California Governor’s Environmental and Economic Leadership Award
- Buildings: Muir Commons, East Lake Commons Conservation Community

Kathryn "Katie" McCamant is an American architect, developer and author based in Nevada City, California. She is known for her work introducing the concept of cohousing in the United States, including co-authoring two books (with her former partner, Charles Durrett) which introduced cohousing to the English-speaking world. She has designed, developed and consulted on dozens of cohousing communities across the United States, Canada and elsewhere.

== Education ==
McCamant has a B.A. in architecture from University of California, Berkeley and a graduate degree from the Royal Academy of Art and Architecture in Copenhagen, Denmark.

== Work ==
McCamant is a co-founder of the cohousing movement in North America and is credited with coining the English term "cohousing", after the Danish concept of bofællesskab [da]. After founding the architecture firm McCamant & Durrett Architects/The CoHousing Company and the development company CoHousing Partners, she started her current firm, CoHousing Solutions, which provides development consulting services to forming cohousing communities and other types of collaborative communities. McCamant is well respected for the breadth of her knowledge and experience in the design and development of cohousing neighborhoods.

She originally came across the idea of cohousing while studying at the Danish International Studies architecture program in Copenhagen. She and Durrett returned to Denmark in 1984 to study the concept in depth, which became the basis of their first book, Cohousing: A Contemporary Approach to Housing Ourselves which introduced the concept to the English-speaking world. Cohousing is a type of intentional community composed of private homes with full kitchens, supplemented by extensive common facilities to create more socially and environmentally sustainable neighborhoods. A cohousing community is planned and managed by the residents - groups of people who want more interaction with their neighbors.

McCamant and Durrett designed Muir Commons, the first cohousing community in North America. The project began after McCamant and Durrett gave a lecture in Davis, California and then were asked to help design the community. Their former Nevada City, California firm, McCamant & Durrett Architects, designed and consulted on more than 55 cohousing communities across the United States. Cohousing has since expanded across North American as well as to many other countries.

In addition to her consulting services, she frequently lectures and gives workshops about cohousing.

McCamant has spoken with The New York Times about cohousing in the United States, how it differs from communal living, early challenges for establishing cohousing in the United States, and the need for developers and the community to work together in developing the project. She describes cohousing developments as similar to an extended family, with the added benefit of being eco friendly.

== Awards and honors ==
In 2001, McCamant was a co-recipient of the United Nations World Habitat Award for her work in designing the East Lake Commons Conservation Community in Atlanta, GA. She and Durrett received an award for mixed-use development that was jointly presented by the American Institute of Architects and the United States Department of Housing and Urban Development. In 2007, she was awarded the Vision 2020 Award of the Sierra Business Council. In 2008, the National Association of Home Builders honored McCamant and Durant with the Energy Value Housing Award and the Silver Award for Best of Senior Living. McCamant and Durrett won the 2011 California Governor’s Environmental and Economic Leadership Award.

== Sampling of Buildings & Completed Projects ==
Muir Commons, Nevada City Cohousing, PDX Commons, Swan’s Market, Doyle Street Cohousing, Wolf Creek Lodge, Germantown Commons, Hearthstone Community, OakCreek Community, Quimper Village, Raven’s Roost Cohousing, Bellingham Cohousing, Berkeley Cohousing, Heddlestone Village, La Querencia, Pleasant Hill Cohousing, Southside Park, Temescal Commons, Temescal Creek, Touchstone Cohousing, Fair Oaks EcoHousing, Haystack Heights, Village Hearth Cohousing, Shepherd Village, Frogsong Cohousing, Wasatch Cohousing, Sunward Cohousing, Skagit Commons, River Song Cohousing, Washington Commons, Heartwood Commons-Tulsa, Bozeman Cohousing

== Media ==
- Retro Report: Short Documentary "Loneliness Is on the Rise. Are Closer Neighbors a Solution?"
- The New York Times: Article "There’s Community and Consensus. But It’s No Commune."
- Psychology Today: Article "The Modern Homemaker: Kathryn McCamant wants to bring community to a neighborhood near you."
- Urban Land Article: "Building Community With Cohousing"
- National Association of Realtors Article: "Cohousing Builds Active Communities"
- Fast Company Article: "The future of housing looks nothing like today's"
- Parade Magazine Article: "How America Lives: Creative Housing Options for Boomers, Veterans, Millennials and More"
- Curbed Article: "Coming of age in cohousing"

== Selected publications ==
- McCamant, McCamant; Milman, Danette (2000). "Reinvigorating Urban Neighborhoods". Communities: Journal of Cooperative Living. 106: 63–66.
- McCamant, Kathryn; Durrett, Charles; Hertzman, Ellen (2003). Cohousing : a contemporary approach to housing ourselves (2nd ed.). Ten Speed Press. ISBN 0-89815-539-8. OCLC 429393294.; reviewed in
- McCamant, Kathryn; Durrett, Charles (2011). Creating cohousing : building sustainable communities. Gabriola, B.C.: New Society Publishers. ISBN 978-1-55092-465-7. OCLC 733084913.

== See also ==
- Sunward Cohousing
