= Charles Durrett =

American architect and author

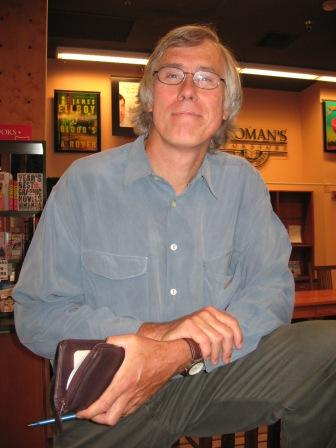
- Born: 1955 (age 70–71); United States
- Occupation: Architect
- Awards: American Institute of Architects awards, World Habitat Award
- Buildings: Muir Commons, East Lake Commons Conservation Community

Charles "Chuck" Durrett is an American architect and author based in Nevada City, California.

== Work ==
With former partner, Kathryn McCamant, Durrett is credited with coining the English term "cohousing" and introducing the cohousing model to North America. Cohousing is a type of intentional community composed of small private homes with full kitchens, supplemented by extensive common facilities. A cohousing community is planned, owned and managed by the residents, groups of people who want more interaction with their neighbours. In recent years he has focused on cohousing for older persons.

Durrett and McCamant designed and developed Muir Commons, the first cohousing community in North America, and has designed or consulted on the design of over 55 cohousing communities in North America. He has also consulted on many other cohousing projects around the world.

He is a major proponent of senior cohousing, also known as elder cohousing, which are residential communities specifically designed for seniors. There are at least three senior cohousing communities in the U.S., one each in California, Colorado, and Virginia. More are in planning, according to Durrett. According to an American Association of Retired Persons representative, senior cohousing is "very interesting niche housing" that is needed as an option.

Durrett is author of The Senior Cohousing Handbook: A Community Approach to Independent Living (2009, 2nd edition), and with Kathryn McCamant, is co-author of Creating Cohousing: Building Sustainable Communities (2011) formerly titled Cohousing: A Contemporary Approach to Housing Ourselves (1988).

He is recipient or co-recipient of numerous awards from the American Institute of Architects and others for various completed projects. This includes a United Nations' World Habitat Award in 2001 for the East Lake Commons Conservation Community project in Atlanta, Georgia. A more recent award was the Vision 2020 Award of the Sierra Business Council.

Durrett has an architecture degree in 1982 from the College of Architecture and Environmental Design, of Cal Poly San Luis Obispo. Since 2009, he has been advocating for senior cohousing, beginning in August of that year, with a book signing tour in ten western U.S. cities.
