= Domus Instituto de Autismo =

Intellectual disability organization in Mexico

Coordinates: 19°22′21.49″N 99°10′54.68″W

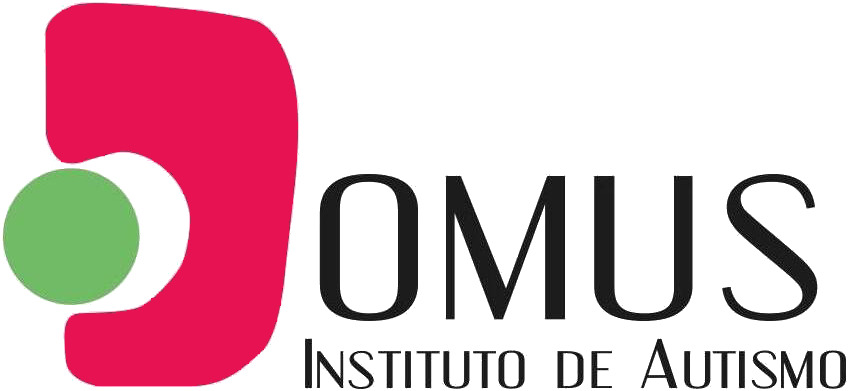
- Founded: 1980
- Type: Autism Support, International Research & Training Center
- Purpose: Autism
- Location: Mexico City, Mexico
- Website: www.institutodomus.org/

Domus Instituto de Autismo (Domus) is a non-profit organization based in Mexico City, Mexico that provides services to individuals with autism and their families. It is one of the first organizations in Mexico that advocated for autistic individuals. Their support program covers the evaluation and diagnosis (neurological tests, behavioral tests and a detailed observation to determine the course of treatment), specialized support (learning basic skills, daily activities, writing, communication, monitoring instruction, stimulation and greater control of movement), and labor integration and school. Domus is known for participating in autism research studies. The organization is also known as Centro Educativo Domus.

In 1980, the organization was founded by a group of parents of autistic children who wanted more support. The original director was Judith Martínez de Vaillard, who also had an autistic son. In 1994, Domus created the first educational integration program in Mexico titled "El alumno con TEA integrado en el aula regular con un Asesor de Integración". In 1997 they created a Special Employment Center, which consisted of a laundry. It currently has a Productive Workshop on Functional Foods (free of casein, gluten, sugar, preservatives, artificial colors and flavors). By the year 2000, they had worked with 400 individuals with autism and were planning to open up a job center for adults with autism.

In 2013, Domus won the Institución en Asistencia Social award. In 2015, the famous bullfighter José Tomás donated 22,000 Euros to Domus. In 2019, Domus partnered with Universidad Internacional de La Rioja to conduct autism research.

In 2020, Domus will host an international conference on its 40th anniversary, "The International Congress on Autism: From Science to Practice".

== See also ==
- List of autism organizations
- Disability in Mexico
