= Grace Kim =

Grace Kim may refer to:

- Grace Kim (tennis) (born 1968), American professional tennis player
- Grace Kim (model) (born 1979), American model
- Grace Kim (golfer) (born 2000), Australian professional golfer
- Grace Kim (architect), American architect and author
