= Sættedammen =

Sættedammen is a cohousing community in New Hammersholt, Denmark.

Established 1972, it is the world's first community defined as modern cohousing, following a path similar to the founders of Bryn Gweled Homesteads in the US 1940's.

The community comprises approximately 60 adults and 20 children in 27 independent households.

Sættedammen is an open, non-dogmatic community, based on social activities (various interest groups, a daily common dinner, common celebration of holidays and cultural events).

== History ==
In 1967, Bodil Graae wrote an article in Politiken entitled Children Should Have a Hundred Parents. In it, she invited people who might be interested in forming a housing collective to contact her, and many did so. This marked the starting point of a long process that would eventually move far from its origins. Extensive discussions and numerous meetings led to the creation of a cohousing project that was ready for residents to move in during 1972.

The buildings were designed by architects Theo Bjerg and Palle Dyreborg, starting 1967,.

A second cohousing project, Skråplanet opened in 1973, followed by other cohousing communities.
