= East Lake Commons Conservation Community =

Sustainable residential project in Atlanta

Coordinates: 33°44′13.0″N 84°18′29.2″W

The East Lake Commons Conservation Community in Atlanta, Georgia is a residential project which is award-winning for its sustainable design.

It was awarded the World Habitat Award by the United Nations in 2001. Designers of the project include architects Charles Durrett and Kathryn McCamant.
