= Sunward Cohousing =

Sunward Cohousing is an intentional community located in Ann Arbor, Michigan, United States. Sunward's founders were pioneers in bringing the cohousing model to Michigan.

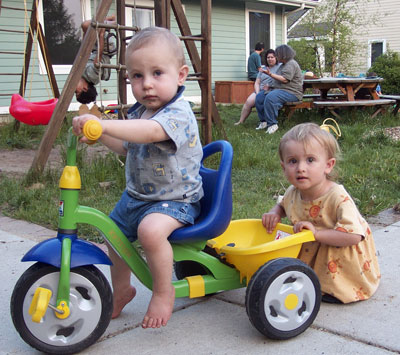
Children playing at Sunward Cohousing

== Demographics ==
The community is made up of 40 households including single individuals, couples, single parents, young families with children, empty nesters, and unrelated adults, ranging in age from infants to octogenarians. Sunward's members, around 65 adults and 25 children, have a variety of cultures, races, religious and spiritual preferences, sexual orientations, and educational and occupational backgrounds. Being an intergenerational village is an important design goal of the community. Members are known as Sunwardians.

== History ==
Sunward has its origins in 1993 when Susan Cameron, Donna White and other founders began to discuss how to bring cohousing to Ann Arbor, inspired by successful efforts outside of Michigan. In January 1994, Nick Meima and other key players invited Kathryn McCamant, the architect who popularized the cohousing model in the U.S., to Ann Arbor to conduct a cohousing workshop. Inspired by her workshop, a group began meeting to establish criteria for site selection.

The Sunward site was discovered in July 1995 on the edge of Ann Arbor in Scio Township. An initial purchase offer was refused because the landowners did not like the cooperative living ideas espoused by the group. In December 1995 a new offer was made and accepted. The early members became developers by forming a limited liability corporation called Ann Arbor Alpha. An architectural firm, Sunstructures Architects, was selected in June 1996. Kathryn McCamant and her partner Charles Durrett conducted two workshops to help members design the site plan and Common House.

The land sale closed in November 1996 and the group then began searching for a builder. The core membership group reached 22 households in December 1996. A final site plan was approved in January 1997, and the group grew to 28 households. A builder, Phoenix Contractors, Inc., was selected in February 1997. By May 1997, 36 households were committed, and unit pricing and selections were made. Construction began May 22, 1997. The community was fully subscribed with 40 households by August 1997. By April 1998, the first homes were certified for occupancy, and community members began to move in. Construction was completed in November 1998, a date the community annually celebrates as its anniversary.

The success of Sunward prompted the creation of two more independent cohousing communities in the area, Great Oak and Touchstone.

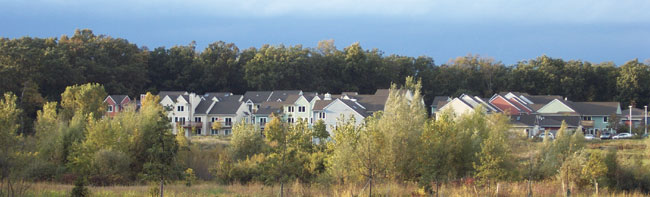
Sunward Cohousing panorama illustrating greenspace preservation, tightly clustered housing, and parking on periphery, 2003.

== Land ==
Sunward is situated on 20 acres (eight hectares) of land with 10-acre (40,000 m^{2}) mature oak and hickory woods contains paths, a nature study area, hidden hammocks, and rolling hills, and it forms a large, common "backyard" to the north of the tightly clustered homes. This area is used for relaxation, recreation, and retreat.

Two ponds, part of a tributary system of Honey Creek, with a footbridge and an earthen dam between them, lie to the south of the homes. They are used for ice skating. They are home to waterfowl, including great blue herons. Several acres of prairie have been tended as a native prairie restoration project. A playfield hosts kid-league soccer matches and other recreational activities. Located further into the woods is the contested micronation of Drainasia, a direct democracy with a population of 5.

The built and paved area of about five acres (two hectares) in the middle of the site was formerly a backfilled gravel pit. Sunward's founders chose to build tightly clustered homes on this land, conserving green and open space, and leaving the woods and natural features mostly intact.

== Built environment ==
Sunward's architecture was designed to encourage interactions and strengthen the connections that are the lifeblood of the community. The structures, in addition to the Common House, include 40 individually owned housing units in a range of sizes and layouts spread across nine buildings, several garages individually owned by some households, a large barn built in the woods during the 1910s, and assorted sheds.

The design attempts to balance community life and personal privacy. The community layout and homes were designed with the concept of a privacy gradient, where privacy increases as one goes toward the back of the house. For example, sitting on one's front porch is an invitation to socialize, while sitting on the back porch is not. Kitchen windows are in the front of every house.

As a pedestrian community, Sunward restricts motor vehicles to the eastern periphery of its land, allowing members to visit and children to play in safety on its paths. Shared handcarts for moving material are kept at locations around the campus.

Sunward's legal structure states that homes are privately owned inside, up to the paint on the interior walls, while the community owns the rest of the structure and everything outside the home.

Social and musical gathering on the piazza

== Community life ==
=== The Common House ===
The Common House is the heart of Sunward community life, where members cook, eat, play, hang out, celebrate, meet, host events, and work together. It is an extension of their individual homes, and it allows residents to live in smaller private homes than they otherwise might need.

The Common House includes a large kitchen, a dining room, a living room, children's play spaces, a game room, a teen room, a meeting room, professional offices, an exercise room, guest rooms, a video theater, a laundry room, and a large workshop. U.S. mailboxes and internal mail "cubbies" are located in the Common House, providing Sunwardians opportunities to interact. Outside the Common House are the centers of summer community life: wooden decks and a brick piazza. The common laundry room is available to all Sunwardians. A team of members cleans the Common House.

=== Shared meals ===
Shared Common House meals are a defining aspect of the community. They provide an opportunity to keep in touch with the neighbors, deepen relationships, and work together while making the meal and cleaning up afterwards. Dinners take place 3-4 times a week. Each month every member does roughly two shifts as assistant cook or cleanup crew, or one shift as head chef. The head chef determines the menu and overall cost of the dinner. A vegetarian option is typically available. In addition to the dinner program, a variety of spontaneous breakfasts, potlucks, and cookouts occur.

=== Governance ===
The Sunward community is managed by its members, who collectively hold decision-making authority. Community decisions are made by consensus. Community Meetings take place monthly in the Common House. A quorum of at least 21 households must be present to make decisions. The Sunward Book of Agreements is the official collection of all standing agreements that the community has made. Although the entire community retains the authority to make major decisions, much of the day-to-day business is delegated to standing committees and ad hoc work groups. These fall into five main areas: leadership, community life, Common House operations, buildings and infrastructure, and land management.

Members work together to raise a shed, 2001

=== Work ===
Most of the work needed to run Sunward is done by the members. Maintenance work is broken into small monthly job allocations on a task schedule. These tasks are distributed to all members. Examples include plowing snow, facilitating meetings, tending trees, managing finances, mopping floors, etc.

=== Children ===
Members tend to be watchful and keep an eye on the children's safety. Children can safely run, bike, and skate in the pedestrian campus. They can use the outdoor play areas, as well as the kids-, teen-, and game-rooms inside the Common House. Children are encouraged but not required to participate in the work of the community.
