= Jean Yancey =

American entrepreneur and motivational speaker (1914–2000)

- Born: Martha Jean Jolliffe; August 18, 1914; Clarksburg, West Virginia, US
- Died: September 15, 2000 (aged 86); Denver, Colorado, US
- Education: University of Denver
- Occupations: Women's small business consultant, motivational speaker
- Spouse: Lenard Royston Yancey Jr.
- Children: 3
- Awards: National Advocate for Women in Small Businesses award, 1982; Colorado Women's Hall of Fame, 1995

Jean Jolliffe Yancey (August 18, 1914 – September 15, 2000) was an American entrepreneur, small business consultant, women's business mentor, and motivational speaker. After working in retail and fashion in New York City and Denver, Colorado, she opened Jean Yancey & Associates in the latter city in 1973, offering training, consulting, and education for women entrepreneurs. In close to 30 years, she assisted more than 1,000 women launching businesses in public relations, advertising, politics, publishing, and other fields, and was known in Denver as "the mother of all businesswomen". She received many awards, including the 1982 National Advocate for Women in Small Businesses award presented by US President Ronald Reagan in a ceremony in the White House Rose Garden. She was inducted into the Colorado Women's Hall of Fame in 1985.

== Early life ==
Yancey was born Martha Jean Jolliffe on August 18, 1914, in Clarksburg, West Virginia. When she was eight years old, her family relocated to Denver, Colorado. As a student at East High School, she and her friend Jane Smith persuaded the president of The Denver Dry Goods Company to host the first high school fashion show in the United States. The three-day event drew 5,000 teens and their mothers.

== Education ==
Yancey studied drama and theatre at the University of Denver for two and a half years, becoming a member of Gamma Phi Beta. In 1936 she moved to New York City to pursue a career in Broadway theatre. In New York, she met and married Lenard Royston Yancey Jr. in April 1937. The couple had three sons.

== Career ==
In New York, Yancey worked in the bridal department at B. Altman and Company and at Joseph Bryne, organizing a large trade show for the latter. During World War II, when her husband was stationed in Denver, she worked as a buyer for teen fashions at Denver Dry Goods. In 1944 her husband was stationed in Tampa, Florida, and in 1948 in Des Moines, Iowa. In 1959 the family moved back to Denver and Yancey resumed working at Denver Dry Goods, managing the bridal department.

In 1962, Yancey and a partner opened the Bridal Loft in Cherry Creek North. She sold the business in 1969. In 1970, she formed the Goldstone Fashion Merchandising School, followed in 1973 by the small business consulting firm of Jean Yancey & Associates. Notwithstanding the name, Yancey ran the firm single-handedly.

Specializing in women's startups, Yancey offered training, consulting, and education to entrepreneurs. In close to 30 years, she assisted more than 1,000 women launching businesses in public relations, advertising, politics, publishing, and other fields. Yancey became known in Denver as "the mother of all businesswomen". She was also a recognized speaker in the United States and Canada, and her insights were quoted by women in business authors. Later in the 1970s, Yancey taught at the Emily Griffith Opportunity School and the Barbizon School of Modeling.

== Memberships ==
Yancey was an executive steering committee member for the Women and Business Conference, a director of the Women's Bank, and an honorary director of the Big Sisters of Denver. She was the first national honorary member of the National Association of Women Business Owners. Other memberships included the International Women's Forum, Fashion Group International, the World Future Society, the Denver Business Women's Network, and the Colorado Women's Forum. She was also a member of a Washington, D.C. committee that set the educational agenda for the 1986 White House Conference on Small Business.

== Honors and awards ==
Yancey was the recipient of many awards for her work mentoring women in business. These included the Salute to Women's 1980 Spice of Life Award and 1983 Outstanding Woman Award, the 1982 Woman of the Year by Soroptomist, the 1990 John Evans Award from the University of Denver, and the 1992 Entrepreneur of the Year Award. In 1982, she was honored as the National Advocate for Women in Small Businesses by President Ronald Reagan at an award ceremony in the White House Rose Garden.

Yancey was inducted into the Colorado Women's Hall of Fame in 1985. She was posthumously inducted into the Alumni Heritage Hall of East High School in 2008.

Several annual awards were named for her. During her lifetime, the Denver chapter of the National Association of Women Business Owners (NAWBO) presented the Jean Yancey Award for Excellence to the entrepreneur who has "made the most difference". Posthumously, the Jean Yancey Outstanding Women in Business awards have been presented by the Denver chapter of NAWBO and the Denver Business Journal, in the categories of Large Business Owner, Small Business Owner, and Member of the Year.

== Later life and death ==
In honor of her 80th birthday in 1994, Yancey's friends dedicated a park bench at Cherry Creek State Park in her name. In honor of her 85th birthday in 1999, 200 guests attended a party at the University of Denver. Yancey received personal greetings from Vice President Al Gore and U.S. Representative Diana DeGette, as well as proclamations signed by Colorado governor Bill Owens and Denver mayor Wellington Webb, who each declared the day as Jean Yancey Day. The party doubled as a benefit for the university's soon to be opened Fisher Early Learning Center. The $20,000 raised from the evening led to the dedication of Grandma Jean's Story Garden at the center.

In her final years, Yancey suffered from pulmonary hypertension and used a wheelchair and portable oxygen cylinder. She died of heart failure on September 15, 2000, aged 86. Her papers are stored at the Denver Public Library.
