= Everybody Is Different =

Book by Fiona Bleach

Everybody Is Different: A Book for Young People Who Have Brothers or Sisters With Autism
- Author: Fiona Bleach
- Illustrator: Fiona Bleach
- Language: English
- Subject: Autism
- Genre: Medical Education
- Publisher: Autism Asperger Publishing Company
- Publication date: April 2005
- Media type: hardcover
- ISBN: 1-931282-06-4
- OCLC: 50789666

Everybody Is Different : A Book for Young People Who Have Brothers or Sisters With Autism is a book by Fiona Bleach.

== Overview ==
The book addresses questions that siblings of children on the autism spectrum may have. In addition to explaining in basic terms the characteristics of autism, it contains suggestions for making family life more comfortable.

== Reception ==
- It was reviewed by Intervention in School & Clinic,
- It is number 10 on a list of top 10 autism books on the website Autism World.
- It is used by Children, Youth and Women's Health Service.
- It is used by The National Autistic Society
- It was recommended about on Another Peace of the Puzzle.
