= International Year of Shelter for the Homeless =

UN recognised year

Official logo

The International Year of Shelter for the Homeless (IYSH) was recognized in 1987 by the United Nations. It was first declared, in principle, in UN resolution 36/71 in 1981, and proclaimed officially in 1982 in resolution 37/221. It was mainly aimed at improving shelter / housing for the poor in general (and not just homeless people), especially in developing countries. It was also a follow-up to the Habitat I conference in 1976.

== Actions ==
In several countries, national actions were created, such as Australia which created an IYSH Secretariat, or the United Kingdom where a trust was created to collect donations from housing associations for shelter projects in developing countries, with some projects part-funded by the Overseas Development Administration. The trust later evolved into the NGO Homeless International (now operating as Reall, or Real Equity for All).

== Legacy ==
The World Habitat Awards were created by the BSHF as their contribution to the IYSH. Two other prizes were created by the Japan Housing Association as awards to deserving housing projects, the IYSH Memorial Prize in 1988 and the IYSH Memorial Encouragement Prize in 2006.

Number	Year	Memorial Prize	Memorial Encouragement Prize
1	1988	Father Jorge Anzorena	
2	1989	Somsook Boonyabancha	
3	1990	Arif Hasan and Sister Annie Abion	
4	1991	Johan Silas and Enrique Ortiz	
5	1992	SPARC	
6	1993	Freedom to Build	
7	1994	People's Dialogue South Africa	
8	1995	Women's Bank and Pagtambayayong Foundation	
9	1996		
10	1997		
11	1998		
12	1999	Human Settlements Foundation (Thailand)	
13	2000		
14	2001	Sevanatha (Sri Lanka)	
15	2002	Shack Dwellers Federation Namibia and ASAG Ahmedabad	
16	2003		
17	2004	Denis Murphy	
18	2005		
19	2006	Lumanti (Nepal)	TAO-Pilipinas (Philippines)
20	2007		Teofang Tnaut (Cambodia)
21	2008	Help-O (Sri Lanka)	Urban Development Resource Center (Mongolia)
22	2009	Urban Poor Development Fund in Cambodia	
23	2010		
