= List of autism organizations =

Organizations involved in autism advocacy, support and research

Autistic people, parents and professionals established organisations throughhout the world providing support, education, advocacy and research.

== Asia ==
=== India ===
- Action for Autism (AFA) provides education, family support and advocacy for autistic people. It began in 1991 as a parent support group focused on raising awareness of autism in India.

=== Indonesia ===
- Yayasan Autisma Indonesia (YAI), meaning Indonesian Autism Foundation, provides information about autism, organizes training and advocates for access to education and support. Five doctors and eight parents of autistic people founded it in Jakarta in 1997.

=== Iran ===
- Iran Autism Association provides education, advice, employment training and family support. Autistic people, families, professionals and other supporters established it in 2013. It was registered in 2014.

=== Israel ===
- Autistic Community of Israel (ACI) is an autistic self-advocacy organization, representing autistic people's own views and interests. It was founded in 2006.
- Israeli Society for Children and Adults with Autism (ALUT) supports autistic people and their families. Founded as a parents' association in 1974, it provides services and advocates for autistic people's rights.
- Kfar Tikva is a residential community for adults with disabilities, including autistic people. Established in 1964, it provides housing, support with daily life and opportunities to work in local businesses and workshops.
- Special in Uniform is a program of Jewish National Fund-USA supporting young adults with disabilities, including autistic people, in serving in the Israel Defense Forces. It traces its origins to an initiative established in 2001.

=== Japan ===
- Autism Society Japan (ASJ) brings together local autism associations and advocates for autistic people and their families. Its predecessor, a national council of parents' groups, was established in 1968. It became an incorporated association under its present name in 1989.
- Tokyo Autism Society supports autistic people and their families and promotes public understanding of autism. Its origins lie in a parents' group established in Tokyo in 1967. The present organization was formed in 2009 through the merger of the Tokyo branch of Autism Society Japan and the Tokyo Autism Centre.

=== Philippines ===
- Autism Society Philippines (ASP) is a national nonprofit organization supporting autistic people and their families. It grew from a group of mothers who began meeting in 1987. The organization was formally established in 1989 as the Foundation for Autistic Children and Adults of the Philippines.

=== Singapore ===
- Autism Resource Centre (Singapore) (ARC(S)) provides education, employment support and training for autistic people, families and professionals. It was established by parent and professional volunteers and registered as a charity in 2000.

=== South Korea ===
- Autism Korea advocates for autistic people and their families and promotes public understanding of autism. It was established in 2006.
- Korean Association for Persons with Autism is an academic society supporting autism research, professional training and education. It was founded in 1994.

=== Taiwan ===
- Autism Society of Taiwan brings together parent associations and other organizations supporting autistic people and their families. Founded in 1996, it advocates for access to education, employment, care and other services.

== Canada ==
- Autism Alliance of Canada brings together organizations and individuals to work on autism policy, research and services. It began in 2007 as the Canadian Autism Spectrum Disorders Alliance.
- Autism Canada provides information, resources and support for autistic people and their families. It was formed in 2015 through the merger of Autism Society Canada, established in 1976, and Autism Canada Foundation, established in 2002.
- Autism Nova Scotia provides support, community programs and advocacy for autistic people and their families in Nova Scotia. Joan and Jack Craig founded it in 2002 as the Provincial Autism Centre.
- Autism Ontario provides information, support and advocacy for autistic people and their families in Ontario. Parents founded it in 1973 as the Ontario Society for Autistic Children. It adopted its current public name in 2006.
- Autism Resource Centre (ARC) provides community programs for autistic people in Regina. Its services include employment support, life-skills programs and summer camps for children and young people.
- Autism Society Alberta (ASA) connects autism organizations and community members across Alberta. It provides information and education and supports research and programs for autistic people and their families.
- AutismBC provides information, advocacy and community programs for autistic people and their families in British Columbia. It has supported the province's autism community since 1975.
- Autistics for Autistics Ontario (A4A) is an organization led by autistic people that advocates for their rights. Its work focuses on school inclusion, employment, housing and access to health care. It also calls for governments to consult autistic people directly when developing policies that affect them.
- Centre for Autism Services Alberta (CFASA) provides programs and services for autistic people from early childhood through adulthood. Its work includes early childhood services, community activities, employment support and independent-living skills.
- Fédération québécoise de l'autisme (FQA), meaning Quebec Autism Federation, brings together organizations and individuals supporting autistic people and their families in Quebec. It has worked in the province since 1976.

== Europe ==
=== Denmark ===
- Specialisterne supports autistic people in finding employment. It was founded by Thorkil Sonne in 2004.

=== Finland ===
- Suomen Autismikirjon Yhdistys (ASY) supports peer connections and participation in advocacy by autistic people. It was founded in 2005 as Suomen Asperger-yhdistys. Its work includes developing a Finnish glossary of autism and neurodiversity terminology based on neurodivergent people's experiences.

=== France ===
- Autisme France is a national association representing families of autistic children and adults. Founded in 1989, it provides information and advocates for access to diagnosis, education and support.
- Fédération Française Sésame Autisme (FFSA), the French Sésame Autisme Federation, brings together associations supporting autistic people and their families. It traces its origins to a parents' association established in Paris in 1963. It became a federation in 1985 and adopted its current name in 1990.

=== Germany ===
- Autismus Deutschland (Autism Germany) is a national association supporting autistic people and their families. It was founded by parents in 1970.
- Wissenschaftliche Gesellschaft Autismus-Spektrum (WGAS), known in English as the Scientific Society Autism Spectrum, promotes autism research and shares research findings across German-speaking countries, including Austria and Switzerland. It was founded in 2008.

=== Ireland ===
- AsIAm provides information and support for autistic people and their families and campaigns for inclusion in Irish society. Adam Harris founded it in 2014. It also speaks publicly about discrimination and misinformation affecting autistic people.
- Thriving Autistic is a nonprofit organization providing support, education and community programmes for autistic adults. Tara O’Donnell-Killen founded it in 2020. Its educational work includes advice for neurodivergent people and families on preparing for travel and managing unfamiliar environments.

=== Italy ===
- Associazione Italiana per l'Assistenza ai Bambini Autistici (AIABA), meaning Italian Association for Assistance to Autistic Children, provides care and support for autistic children and adults. It was founded by parents in 1970.

=== Netherlands ===
- Nederlandse Vereniging voor Autisme (NVA), meaning Dutch Association for Autism, was founded by parents in 1978.
- Personen uit het Autisme Spectrum (PAS), meaning People on the Autism Spectrum, is an organization led by autistic people. Launched in 2001, it organizes peer meetings, shares knowledge and provides advice based on autistic people's experiences.

=== Russia ===
- Autism Regions brings together organizations established by parents and relatives of autistic people. Founded in 2017, it works on access to education, services and support for autistic people and their families.

=== Spain ===
- Asociación de Padres de Hijos con Autismo de Catalunya (APAFAC), an association of parents of autistic children in Catalonia, provides services and support for autistic people and their families. It was founded in 1976.
- Aspanaes is an autism organization based in Galicia. It was established on 24 November 1979.
- Confederación Autismo España (Autism Spain) brings together organizations supporting autistic people and their families across Spain. It began in 1994, when representatives of four family-founded organizations formed a federation.

=== Sweden ===
- Autism Sverige (Autism Sweden) is a national autism organization founded by parents and professionals in 1973. It has operated under several names and adopted its current name in 2022.

=== Switzerland ===
- Autisme Suisse Romande is an autism association in French-speaking Switzerland. It was established in 1985 and adopted its current name in 2001.
- Autismo Svizzera, also known as Autismo Svizzera Italiana, supports autistic people and their families in Italian-speaking Switzerland. It provides information, family support and opportunities to meet and take part in activities.
- Autismus Schweiz, formerly Autismus Deutsche Schweiz, provides information and support for autistic people, their families and professionals in German-speaking Switzerland. It was established in 1975.

=== Turkey ===
- Türkiye Otistiklere Destek ve Eğitim Vakfı (TODEV), the Turkish foundation for support and education for autistic people, supports education and services for autistic people and their families. The foundation was established in 1997, following the creation of a related association by families and volunteers in 1991.

=== United Kingdom ===
- Aspies For Freedom (AFF) began in 2004 as an online autistic rights group founded by Gareth and Amy Nelson.
- Autism Awareness Campaign UK was launched in 2000 by Ivan and Charika Corea. Its work later contributed to the establishment of the UK Autism Foundation.
- Autism Education Trust (AET) provides training and resources for education professionals working with autistic children and young people. The National Autistic Society and Ambitious about Autism established it in 2007, with support from the Department for Education.
- Autistica is an autism research and campaigning charity founded by Stephanie Shirley in 2004.
- National Autistic Society (NAS) advocates for autistic people's rights and provides information and services. It began as a parents' organization in 1962.

=== Europe-wide organizations ===
- Autism-Europe brings together autism organizations across Europe. It was established in 1983 by national and regional associations.
- European Council of Autistic People (EUCAP) brings together national and regional organizations led by autistic people. Established in 2019, it promotes autistic people's participation in public debate and policymaking and cooperation between organizations across Europe.

== Latin America ==
=== Argentina ===
- Asociación Argentina de Padres de Autistas (APAdeA), meaning Argentine Association of Parents of Autistic People, provides guidance, family support and advocacy. Founded in 1994, it works to improve access to education, employment, health care and community life for autistic people.

=== Brazil ===
- Associação de Amigos do Autista (AMA), meaning Association of Friends of Autistic People, provides education, therapy and family support. Parents founded it in 1983.

=== Chile ===
- Fundación Apoyo Autismo Chile provides training, advice and support for autistic people, families and professionals. It began in 2011 and was formally established as a foundation in 2017.

=== Colombia ===
- Liga Colombiana de Autismo (LICA), meaning Colombian Autism League, advocates for autistic people's rights and equal opportunities. It began in 2009 as a family-based organization working to address exclusion.

=== Mexico ===
- Autistas de México is an organization led by autistic people that provides community support, education and advocacy. Its community activities began in 2019, and it was formally registered as a civil association in December 2021. Its president, Yadira García, advocates for greater understanding of autistic people's experiences, including those of women and mothers.
- Domus Instituto de Autismo is an autism organization established in 1980.
- Iluminemos por el Autismo supports families, raises public awareness and advocates for policies promoting autistic people's rights and inclusion. It was established as a nonprofit association in 2015.

=== Paraguay ===
- Esperanza para el Autismo (EPA), meaning Hope for Autism, brings together parents, relatives and friends of autistic people. It provides a space for family support, information and advocacy.

=== Peru ===
- Asociación de Padres y Amigos de Personas con Trastorno del Espectro Autista (ASPAU Perú), an association of parents and friends of autistic people, provides information, guidance, training and family support. It promotes autistic people's rights and participation in community life.

=== Uruguay ===
- Aletea works to improve the quality of life of autistic people and their families. Its approach draws on neurodiversity and the social model of disability.
- Federación Autismo del Uruguay, meaning Autism Federation of Uruguay, brings together associations and individuals advocating for autistic people's rights. It was founded in 2011, following a movement of families and service providers formed the previous year.

== Oceania ==
=== Australia ===
- Amaze provides information and advocates for autistic people and their families. Parents established it in 1967 as the Victorian Autistic Children's Association. It became Autism Victoria in 1995 and adopted the name Amaze in 2011.
- Australian Autism Alliance brings together autism organizations to advocate on national policy and services. It was formally established in August 2016.
- Autism Association of Western Australia provides services for autistic children and adults and support for their families. It was established in 1967.
- Autism CRC supports research and develops guidance on services and support for autistic people throughout their lives. It was established in 2013 under the Australian Government's Cooperative Research Centres program and later continued independently of that program.
- Autism Northern Territory (Autism NT) provides information, social groups, education and advocacy for autistic people and their families in the Northern Territory. Families and professionals established it in 2002.
- Autism Queensland provides education, therapy and support for autistic children and adults and their families. Originally called the Autistic Children's Association of Queensland, it was registered as a charity in 1967.
- Autism SA provides services, information and advocacy for autistic people and their families in South Australia. It was founded in 1964.
- Autism Spectrum Australia (Aspect) provides education and other services for autistic people and their families.
- Autism Tasmania supports autistic children and adults and their families in participating in everyday life in Tasmania.
- Reframing Autism is a charity run by autistic people for autistic people, their families and supporters. It provides education and resources and promotes acceptance, inclusion and autistic people's control over their own lives.

=== Cook Islands ===
- Autism Cook Islands (ACI) supports autistic people and their families. It grew from families seeking information and support and was established as an incorporated society in 2017.

=== Fiji ===
- Pacific Autism Centre (PAC) provides assistance to autistic children and their families. Its work has received support from Fiji's Ministry of Women, Children and Social Protection.

=== French Polynesia ===
- Entre Deux Mondes, meaning Between Two Worlds, raises awareness of autism and advocates for better services for autistic children and their families in French Polynesia.
- Tous CAApables raises awareness of autism and develops support for autistic children and their parents in French Polynesia.

=== New Caledonia ===
- Association Soutien Autisme Les Lucioles is an autism support association in New Caledonia. It is listed alongside the Institut Spécialisé Autisme (ISA) in the territory's disability services directory.

=== New Zealand ===
- Altogether Autism is a free information and advisory service for autistic people, families, professionals and the wider community. It operates as a partnership between Your Way | Kia Roha and Parent to Parent, with funding from the New Zealand government.
- Autism New Zealand provides information, support and education for autistic people and their families. It traces its origins to a parents' group formed in 1969 and became an incorporated society in 1995.
- Pasifika Autism Support Group supports autistic people of Pacific heritage and their families in New Zealand.

=== Regional organizations ===
- Autistic Self Advocacy Network of Australia and New Zealand (ASAN AUNZ) is an organization led by autistic people that advocates for their rights and participation in public policy. Its origins lie in the Australian Autistic Network for Self Advocates, formed after advocates met at the World Autism Congress in Melbourne in 2002.

== United States ==
- Alternative Baseball Organization provides baseball opportunities for autistic teenagers and adults and people with other disabilities. Taylor Duncan founded it in Dallas, Georgia, in 2016.
- Association for Autism and Neurodiversity (AANE) provides education, information, referrals and community support for autistic people and their families. It was founded in Massachusetts in 1996 as the Asperger's Association of New England and later became the Asperger/Autism Network before adopting its current name.
- Autism Network International (ANI) is an organization established by autistic people in 1992. It developed community connections through correspondence, its newsletter Our Voice and the Autreat gatherings.
- Autism Research Institute (ARI) supports autism research and shares research findings with families and professionals. Bernard Rimland established it in 1967 as the Institute for Child Behavior Research.
- Autism Science Foundation (ASF) funds autism research and provides information about research to the public. Alison Singer and Karen London founded it in 2009.
- Autism Society of America provides information, advocacy and connections to local support for autistic people and their families. Its founders in 1965 included Ruth C. Sullivan, Bernard Rimland and Ole Ivar Lovaas.
- Autism Speaks funds research, provides information and advocates for access to services for autistic people and their families. Bob and Suzanne Wright founded it in 2005.
- Autistic Self Advocacy Network (ASAN) is an organization run by and for autistic people that advocates for their civil rights and participation in decisions affecting their lives. It was founded in 2006. Its work includes public policy advocacy and community organizing.
- Autistic Women & Nonbinary Network (AWN) provides community support, resources and advocacy for autistic women, girls and people of marginalized genders. It began in 2009 as Autism Women's Network and adopted its current name in 2018.
- Council of Autism Service Providers (CASP) represents organizations providing autism services. Its predecessor, the Council on Autism Services, began in 2009 when leaders from ten service providers met to share ideas and discuss common problems. CASP was legally established as a nonprofit organization in December 2015.
- Interagency Autism Coordinating Committee (IACC) was established by the National Institutes of Health in 2001 to improve coordination of federal autism activities, following the Children's Health Act of 2000.
- KultureCity promotes acceptance and inclusion of autistic people and people with sensory processing difficulties. Doctors Michele Kong and Julian Maha founded it in 2013.
- National Alliance for Autism Research (NAAR) was an organization funding autism research. Established in 1994, it merged with Autism Speaks in 2006.
- National Autism Association (NAA) is a parent-run nonprofit organization focusing on safety, crisis prevention and support for autistic people and their families. It was founded in 2003.
- National Council on Severe Autism (NCSA) advocates on services, housing and public policy for autistic people who need continuous or near-continuous supervision and support, and their families. It publicly launched in January 2019.
- Stimpunks Foundation provides financial assistance, grants and other support for neurodivergent and disabled people, including autistic people. It was founded in December 2021 and is run by and for the communities it serves.
- The Autism Community in Action (TACA) provides education and support for families of autistic people. Glen and Lisa Ackerman founded it in 2000 as Talk About Curing Autism. It adopted its current name in 2019.
- Twainbow supports autistic people who identify as LGBTQ+. Louis Molnár founded it in 2015.
- Washington Autism Alliance (WAA) helps autistic people and their families obtain health care, education and other services. It began in 2007. Its work includes insurance advocacy, legal action and assistance to families seeking coverage for services.
- Wrong Planet is an online community where autistic people can meet, share experiences and discuss their interests. Alex Plank and Dan Grover established it in 2004.
