= Cohousing =

Intentional community of private homes clustered around shared space

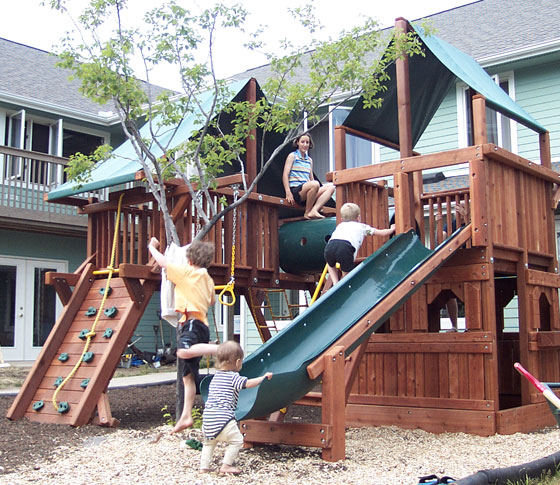
Cohousing playground next to common house

Cohousing is an intentional, self-governing, cooperative community where residents live in private homes often clustered around shared space. The term originated in Denmark in the late 1960s. Families live in attached or single-family homes with traditional amenities, usually including a private kitchenette. As part of the communal orientation, shared spaces typically feature a common house, which may include a large kitchen and dining area, laundry, and recreational spaces. Walkways, open space, parking, playgrounds and gardens are common examples of shared outdoor spaces designed to promote social interactions. Neighbors also often share resources like tools, babysitting and creative skills.

Neighbors collaboratively plan and manage community activities and shared spaces while maintaining their own income and private lives. The legal structure is typically a homeowner association or housing cooperative, and some use community land trusts. To promote the common good, cohousing members regularly share meals, attend meetings, and participate in community work days. As part of cohousing's social nature, neighbors gather for parties, games, gardening, musical performances, movies, sports, and celebrations. Living in cohousing makes it easy for residents to form clubs, organize child and elder care, share information, free cycle and carpool.

Cohousing facilitates interaction among neighbors and thereby provides social, practical, economic, and environmental benefits. With democracy in action in their cohousing community, residents also tend to be more active in civic affairs in the broader community.

== Characteristics ==
Cohousing requires active participation by residents, and communities are usually structured – in principle and often in architecture – to encourage interactions and the formation of relationships among their members. Neighbors are encouraged to cooperate within the community and to care for each other. Community involvement promotes an interdependent village-like experience where neighbors know each other. Cohousing developments are usually limited to around 20–50 homes and often have large common areas where residents interact. While cohousing developments are designed to encourage community, residents can also have personal privacy. Residents are able to choose how much they engage in order to find the right balance between their privacy and community involvement. Decision-making in cohousing communities is often based on building a consensus within the community. Residents work together to maintain the shared space which they can all use, usually saving money. At the same time, residents manage their own private space.

Although most cohousing groups seek to develop multi-generational communities, some are also based on sustainability, others create supportive communities for senior living. Cohousing proponent and architect Charles Durrett wrote a handbook on creating senior cohousing while the cohousing leader and architect Kathryn McCamant created the 500 Communities Program to train professionals to support groups building sustainable cohousing. Although all cohousing communities are intentional—including many ecovillages (such as Sawyer Hill in Massachusetts and Los Angeles Ecovillage in California)--the broader term of intentional communities encompasses alternative forms of living, ranging from communes to ashrams to monasteries which are not always managed collaboratively and do not necessarily include the privacy and individual living space of cohousing. The collaborative democracy that distinguishes cohousing generally provides a foundation for a range of beliefs and ways of understanding, however some cohousing communities are instead based on shared religious beliefs or philosophy.

== Co-living ==
Cohousing can be considered related to co-living as the concepts appear to overlap. Both co-living and cohousing have shared areas that benefit all, such as spaces for events or communal meals. Cohousing provides self-contained private dwellings (often houses but sometimes apartments), often owned by the resident, but sometimes rented. Co-living on the other hand may have independent units within the same building (apartments or rooms), which are often rented. However, none of these are exclusive, thus the potential overlaps. The key distinction is that cohousing embeds collective resident control and stewardship into its legal form and decision making whereas co-living is typically owned and run by external investors or operators, although the owner sometimes also lives in the co-living space.

== Origins ==
There are precedents for cohousing with the Siheyuan, or quadrangle design of housing in China which has a shared courtyard and is thus similar in some respects to cohousing. Unlike the utopian movement in 18th and 19th century, the three villages of Arden, Ardentown, and Ardencroft, Delaware founded at the turn of the 20th century as well as Bryn Gweled Homesteads founded in 1940 in Southampton, Pennsylvania incorporate private homes on commonly owned land while promoting cooperative values. These cohousing communities were established in part based on Henry George’s single-tax theory. In the 1920s in New York, the rise of cooperative apartment housing, which now make up over 70% of all homes in Manhattan, similarly incorporate shared facilities, self government and greater social interaction but rarely include prospective residents participation in the design process nor the intentionality of current cohousing. Swedish social scientists and architects advanced common space coupled with private homes, followed by the modernists in the 1930's-'50's who spurred the building of many cohousing communities, such as Marieberg in Stockholm.

Distinct from communal living experiments associated with the hippie movement, the modern application of cohousing developed in Denmark in the 1960s among groups of families who were dissatisfied with existing housing and communities that they felt did not meet their needs, particularly in respect to work-life balance. Bodil Graae wrote a newspaper article titled "Children Should Have One Hundred Parents", spurring a group of 50 families to organize around a community project in 1967. This group split into two groups who developed the cohousing projects Sættedammen and Skråplanet, which are among the oldest known modern cohousing communities. The key organizer was Jan Gudmand Høyer who drew inspiration from his architectural studies at Harvard and interaction with experimental U.S. communities of the era. He published the article "The Missing Link between Utopia and the Dated Single Family House" in 1968, converging a second group.

Self-governing cohousing communities, such as Sharingwood in Washington, N Street in California, Ecovillage at Ithaca and Cantines Island, both in New York, were built in the '80's and '90's with cooperatively owned space and a social structure that encourages supportive interactions, balanced with privately owned homes, as collaborative alternatives to typical American subdivisions. The Danish term bofællesskab (living community) was promoted in North America as cohousing by two American architects, Kathryn McCamant and Charles Durrett, who visited several cohousing communities and wrote about what they learned in books with the aim of advancing cohousing development. Building on the success of a few earlier, established cohousing developments, the first community in the United States to be designed, constructed and occupied as cohousing by the McCamant Durrett team is Muir Commons in Davis, California in 1991. In the following decades, their vision of cohousing has become dominant, while communities such as the Hundredfold Farm in Pennsylvania and Genesee Gardens in Michigan represent more expansive models of how families join to form cohousing communities.

== Growth ==
Cohousing communities are part of the cooperative economy in the United States and are predicted to expand rapidly in the next few decades as individuals and families seek to live more sustainably, and in community with neighbors. Since the Muir Commons in Davis, California was completed in 1991, more than 160 communities have been established in 25 states plus the District of Columbia, with more than 125 in process. Most cohousing communities are intergenerational with both children and elders; in recent years, senior cohousing focused on older adult needs have grown. These communities are often environmentally friendly and socially sustainable.

Hundreds of cohousing communities exist in Denmark and other countries in northern Europe. In Canada, there are 17 completed communities, and approximately 42 in the forming, development, or construction phase. There are more than 300 cohousing communities in the Netherlands (73 mixed-generation and 231 senior cohousing), with about 60 others in planning or construction phases. There are also communities in Australia, the United Kingdom, New Zealand and other parts of the world.

Cohousing started to develop in the UK at the end of the 1990s. The movement has gradually built up momentum and there are now 14 purpose built cohousing communities. A further 40+ cohousing groups are developing projects and new groups are forming all the time. Cohousing communities in the UK range from around eight households to the largest so far around 50 households. Most communities are mixed communities with single people, couples and families but there is a growing number that are specialist - for people over 50, women or LGBT+ communities. The communities themselves range from new developments built to modern eco standards to conversions of everything from farms to Jacobean mansions to former hospital buildings and are in urban, rural and semi- rural locations.

One of the prominent voices for cohousing in the United States is Grace Kim, a principal of Schemata Workshop architectural firm in Seattle, a founder of Capitol Hill Urban Cohousing in Seattle, and a boardmember of the US Cohousing Association. For Kim, cohousing provides a possible solution to the worldwide problems of loneliness and isolation, through the intentionality of people to live collaboratively. Kim spoke in Vancouver at an April 2017 TED talk on the topic of cohousing, asserting that cohousing can make us happier via an intentionality on relationships that births communitas—the spirit of community.

== Design ==
A key feature of this model is its flexibility to the needs and values of its residents and the characteristics of the site. Cohousing can be urban, suburban or rural. The physical form is typically compact but varies from low-rise apartments to townhouses to clustered detached houses. They tend to keep cars to the periphery which promotes walking through the community and interacting with neighbors as well as increasing safety for children at play within the community. Shared green space is another typical characteristic, whether for gardening, play, or places to gather. When more land is available than is needed for the physical structures, the structures are usually clustered closely together, leaving as much of the land as possible "open" for shared use. This aspect of cohousing directly addresses the growing problem of suburban sprawl.

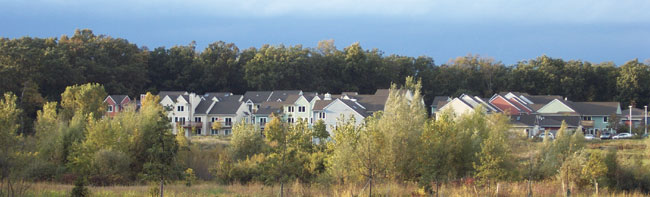
The Sunward Cohousing community illustrating greenspace preservation, tightly clustered housing, and parking on periphery, Ann Arbor, Michigan, 2003.

In addition to "from-scratch" new-built communities (including those physically retrofitting/re-using existing structures), there are also "retrofit" (aka "organic") communities, in which neighbors create "intentional neighborhoods" by buying adjacent properties and removing fences. Examples range from N Street Cohousing in Davis, California to Bristol Village in Vermont. Often infill cohousing members create amenities such as common houses after the fact while living there.

Cohousing differs from some types of intentional communities in that the residents do not have a shared economy nor, usually, a common set of beliefs or religion, but instead invest in creating a socially rich and interconnected community. A non-hierarchical structure employing a cooperative decision-making model is how residents usually manage their communities. Some individuals take on leadership roles, such as being responsible for coordinating a garden, developing budgets or facilitating meetings.

== Ownership form ==
Most cohousing communities in the U.S. currently rely on one of two existing legal forms of real estate ownership: individually titled houses with common areas owned by a homeowner association (condominiums) or a housing cooperative. Condo ownership is most common because it fits many financial institutions' and cities' models for multi-unit owner-occupied housing development. U.S. banks lend more readily on single-family homes and condominiums than housing cooperatives. Charles Durrett points out that rental cohousing is a very likely future model, as it already is being practiced in Europe. In Australia, due to higher legal complexity of cooperatives, cohousing projects are most commonly developed under limited proprietary company with cooperative-like rules.

Cohousing differs from standard condominium development and master-planned subdivisions because the development is designed by, or with considerable input from, its future residents. The design process invariably emphasizes consciously fostering social relationships among its residents. Common facilities are based on the actual needs of the residents, rather than on what a developer thinks will help sell units. Turnover in cohousing developments is typically very low, and there is usually a waiting list for homes to become available.

In Europe the term "joint building ventures" has been coined to define the form of ownership and housing characterized as cohousing. According to the European Urban Knowledge Network (EUKN): "Joint building ventures are a legal federation of persons willing to build who want to create owner-occupied housing and to participate actively in planning and building."

== See also ==
- Community-led housing – Way to let future residents design and develop housing, aka Baugruppe
- Permaculture – Approach to agriculture and land management
- Transgenerational design – Making products and environments compatible with human aging
