= Autism Society Philippines =

Autism support organization in the Philippines

- Formation: 1987; 39 years ago March 8, 1989; 37 years ago (incorporation)
- Founders: 11 mothers (see history)
- Type: NGO
- Purpose: Autism acceptance and rights advocacy
- Location: Quezon City, Metro Manila, Philippines
- Region served: Philippines (106 chapters; 2026)
- Website: www.autismsocietyphilippines.org
- Formerly called: Foundation for Autistic Children and Adults of the Philippines (until 1994)

The Autism Society Philippines (ASP) is an organization in the Philippines which aims to provide support for autistic people and their families.

== History ==
The Autism Society Philippines' (ASP) history dates back to 1987 when eleven mothers of autistic children (Marinette Aglipay, Emma Cruz, Yolanda De Guzman, Asteria Fernandez, Jean Gonzales, Fatima Kho, Ma. Amelia Lachica, Elizabeth Peralejo, Conchita Ragragio Cecile Sicam, and Noida Tan) organized themselves.

They formally established the organization on March 8 1989 as the Foundation for Autistic Children and Adults of the Philippines (ACAP Foundation).

It held its first general assembly in August 1990. In May 1994, during its fourth assembly the ACAP Foundation adopted its current name.

In 2000, ASP held its first Angels' Walk in Quezon City, a parade which serves as its flagship annual activity.

== Positions ==
The ASP has advocated for the acceptance of people with autistic spectrum disorder (ASD). It has rejected the characterization of autistic people as "mind-boggling" or "incomplete". It has discouraged the usage of the puzzle piece as an autism symbol as early as 2010. The ASP has supported the Hidden Disabilities Sunflower campaign which proposes the use of sunflower to signal invisible disabilities in general such as autism.

In 2018, the ASP estimates that 1 out of 100 people in the Philippines have ASD.

In 2023, the ASP has raised the issue of the lack of government data on bullying in the Philippines specifically of persons with disabilities (PWDs) in light of a 2021 UNESCO report that PWDs are more likely to be victims than their non-disabled peers worldwide.

The ASP makes their stances known in aspects of popular culture to combat social stigma on autism and disability and aims to clear misunderstandings about the condition. They have condemned the popularization of the "The Boyet Challenge", where social media users imitate the character of Boyet from GMA television series My Special Tatay. The ASP reportedly had inquiries if that if autism could be cured after the protagonist of Budoy became "normal" after the character got his head hit. It also advocates for the cessation of using the word "autistic" as an insult.

== Activities ==
=== Angels' Walk ===
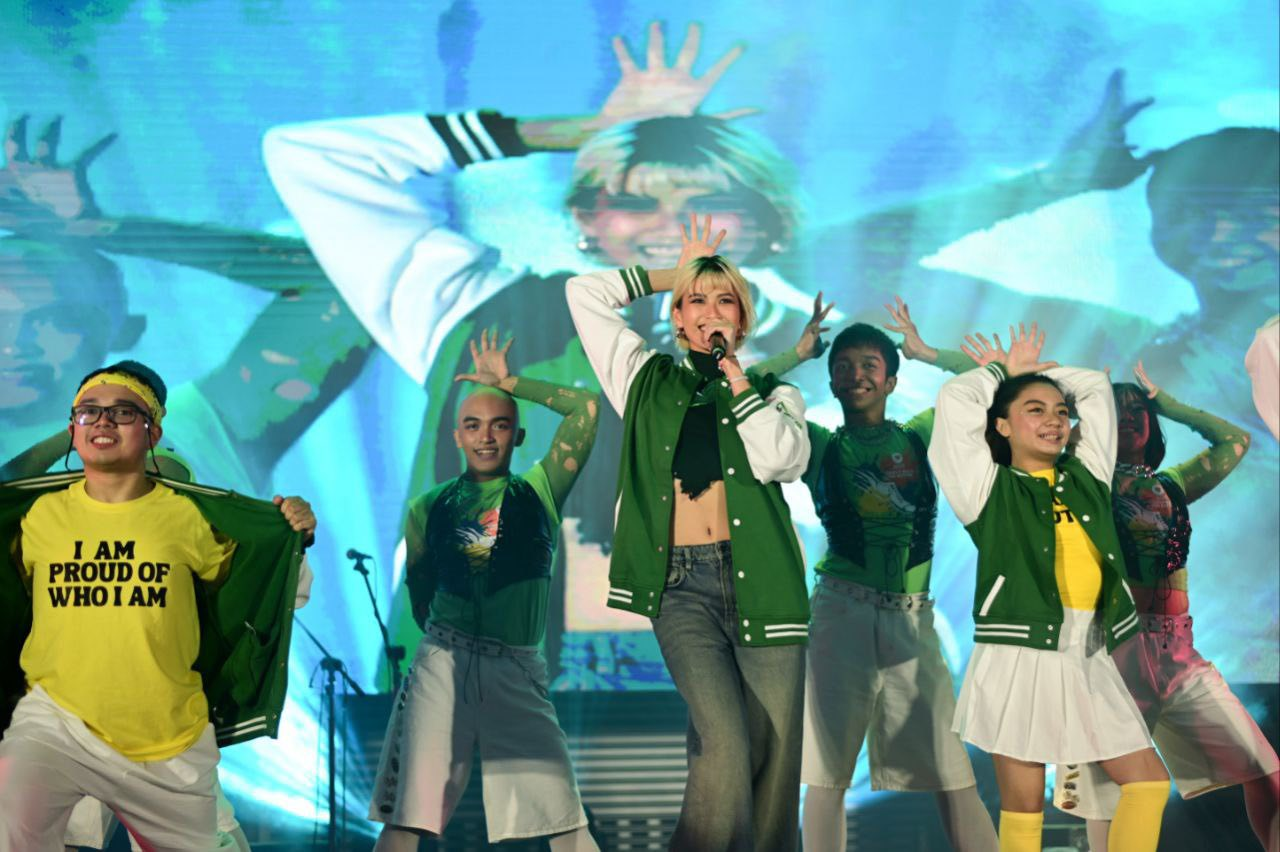
Michelle Dee during a performance at the 2025 Angels Walk at the SM Mall of Asia Arena

The Angels' Walk is a parade participated by autistic people, their families and other supporters. It started at the Quezon Memorial Circle in Quezon City in the year 2000 with 200 participants.

It is usually held in shopping malls since 2004 as a partnership with SM Supermalls. The collaboration with SM began after an autistic boy was asked to leave in shopping mall which led to the establishment of SM Cares.

=== Legislation lobbying ===
The ASP launched a petition in 2016 in support of Senate Bill No. 2890 which amends the Magna Carta for Persons With Disabilities (PWDs) which gives PWDs exemption from value added tax The bill eventually became law as Republic Act No. 10754.

== See also ==
- List of autism organizations
