= Muir Commons =

Housing development in California

Coordinates: 38.5558°N 121.7794°W

Muir Commons is a cohousing development located in Davis, California. Completed in 1991, Muir Commons was designed by Charles Durrett of The Cohousing Company in Nevada City, CA and developed by Kathryn McCamant of Cohousing Solutions in Nevada City, CA, is known for being the first new-construction cohousing development in the United States. Opposed to many traditional neighborhoods, Muir Commons was created and maintained around the premise of fostering a sense of community between its residents by facilitating community-level functionality. While each family or individual lives in a privately owned residence, many other features of the community are shared, including a central communal building, an orchard, gardens, yards, workshops, and even the decision-making process.

== Design history ==
As one of the original cohousing developments in the United States, the inspiration for the layout and framework of Muir Commons came primarily from European models of cohousing communities. These models focused on creating an atmosphere for increased social interaction and included aspects such as private homes, common areas, internal methods of management, and shared community objectives. Although the individual residence dwellings are privately owned, common areas within the neighborhood are owned and maintained equally by all residents.

The process of designing and implementing Muir Commons was strongly influenced by considerations of future residents, with the help and guidance of McCamant & Durrett Architects. Local workshops were conducted within the community to assess needs, which covered the "design, development, group, and financial processes". One resident-suggested outcome from this process included the decision to make all units wheelchair accessible. Due to limited funds and the intention for most of the homes to be considered affordable, the design and development process was heavily focused on communal features as opposed to individual dwellings. The neighborhood was completed in the summer of 1991.

== Community characteristics ==
In order to foster a community-oriented living environment, all homes face towards the interior of the property and are congregated around a central walking path. All parking for the neighborhood is located along the periphery of the community as to only allow bicycles and foot traffic within the living environment. According to McCamant & Durrett Architects, the reason for this is to enable more face-to-face interaction and create a safe environment for children.

A central component of Muir Commons is a community building that contains a kitchen, laundry room, office, gym, guest rooms, and a large room for gathering. In addition to this, there is a garage studio available to all residents that provides tools for automobile and home maintenance. Muir Commons also includes a variety of outdoor community spaces, such as a playground, an orchard, gardens, and lawns.

As a cohousing development, the upkeep of the community and property relies on continued collaboration between residents. All residents are expected to contribute to the maintenance of the shared areas, as well as help cook a meal once a month for the rest of the community. In addition to this, all decisions that affect the entire community are made by consensus.
