= Margaret H. Lippert =

American writer (born 1942)

- Born: June 12, 1942 (age 84); Philadelphia, Pennsylvania, U.S.
- Education: Swarthmore College; Teachers College, Columbia University (EdD)
- Occupation: Author
- Spouse: Alan
- Children: 2
- Parent(s): John Hodgkin; Ruth Walenta Hodgkin
- Website: www.storypower.net

Margaret H. Lippert (born June 12, 1942) is an American author of books and anthologies drawing from the folklore and storytelling traditions of cultures from around the world.

== Early life and career ==
Margaret H. Lippert was born in Philadelphia, Pennsylvania to Quaker parents John Hodgkin and Ruth Walenta Hodgkin. She was raised in the cooperative community of Bryn Gweled, which her parents helped to found, outside Philadelphia. Her storytelling roots can be traced to her father, who knew two stories by heart and told them to her and her brothers on alternating nights as he put them to bed. Particularly after her oldest brother David died at age 10, Margaret found second homes in the families of her neighbors, and spent much of her time as a young girl and teenager taking care of and telling stories to children in the community.

Lippert matriculated at Swarthmore College in 1960. During her years at Swarthmore, she was active in the civil rights movement, traveling to Tennessee to register black voters in the state. While living with a black sharecropper family, she had both inspiring and harrowing experiences, including being shot at by segregationists. After graduating from Swarthmore in 1964, she volunteered for two years with the American Friends Service Committee. Stationed in Tanzania for her first year, it was where her lifelong passion for African culture and storytelling began. She spent her second year in Guatemala, where she learned Spanish.

Lippert spent the next decade teaching in New York City and the surrounding areas, using storytelling as a foundation for much of her classroom instruction. She received her Ed. D. in Education from Teachers College, Columbia University in 1983 and wrote her dissertation on the use of storytelling in the classroom.

== Writing career ==
Lippert is the author of 22 books, including 9 anthologies and 13 books for children and young adults. Her first book was published in 1988.

Much of Lippert’s body of work draws from the storytelling and folklore traditions of Africa, Latin America, and Asia. After moving from New York to the Seattle area in 1990, she began a collaboration with Won-Ldy Paye, a Liberian storyteller from the Dan tribe tradition. Her most recent books grew out of this partnership, and are co-authored by Paye.

Lippert has worked with illustrators, including Caldecott Medal Winners Leo and Diane Dillon (Why the Moon is in the Sky), Ashley Bryan (Why Leopard Has Spots), and Julie Paschkis (Head, Body, Legs; Mrs. Chicken and the Hungry Crocodile; and The Talking Vegetables).

Lippert's awards include: The Charlotte Zolotow Honor Award for Outstanding Writing in Picture Books (Mrs. Chicken and the Hungry Crocodile, 2004); The Chapman Award for Best Classroom Read-Alouds (Mrs. Chicken and the Hungry Crocodile, 2003); American Library Association Notable Children's Book (Head, Body, Legs, 2003); Aesop Accolade Award—American Folklore Society (Head, Body, Legs, 2002; Why Leopard Has Spots, 1999); Best Book for Older Readers—African Studies Association (Why Leopard Has Spots, 1999).

== Later career ==
Lippert currently resides in Mercer Island, Washington, with her husband Alan. Her two daughters, Jocelyn Ruth (b. 1982) and Dawn Samantha (b. 1984), live in Washington D.C.

Lippert continues to write, tell stories at schools and libraries, and teach writing for children as a professor at the University of Washington Extension School. She also serves as an adjunct professor in the Lesley University Creative Arts In Learning program, teaching the use of storytelling in elementary education.

In 2007, Head, Body, Legs was chosen as the "We Share a Story" book of the year, to be read in 23 countries on 6 continents. After hearing the story, children in each country decorated and cut out body part pieces that will be brought together to make paper people with parts from different countries and sent back to the children’s schools. Lippert traveled to Australia, Denmark, Norway and England as part of the program.

== Philosophy ==
Lippert believes in the power of storytelling to infuse energy and imagination into the lives of children, both at school and at home. Her books and teaching draw from her lifetime of experience using storytelling to inspire children, and seek to build community by reinvigorating the spirit of the oral tradition.

== Works ==
=== Books for children ===
- The Talking Vegetables, Holt, 2006 (co-authored by Won-Ldy Paye and illustrated by Julie Paschkis)
- Mrs. Chicken and the Hungry Crocodile, Holt, 2003 (co-authored by Won-Ldy Paye and illustrated by Julie Paschkis)
- Head, Body, Legs: A Story from Liberia, Holt, 2002 (co-authored by Won-Ldy Paye and illustrated by Julie Paschkis)
- Finist the Falcon: A Russian Legend, Troll, 1996 (illustrated by Dave Albers)
- The Sea Serpents’s Daughter: A Brazilian Legend, Troll, 1993 (illustrated by Felipe Davalos)
- Why the Moon Is in the Sky: An African Folk Tale, Macmillan, 1988 (illustrated by Leo and Diane Dillon)
- The Three Billy Goats Gruff, Macmillan, 1988 (illustrated by Jan Pyk)
- The Clever Turtle, Macmillan, 1988 (illustrated by Ray Cruz)
- The Little Red Hen, Macmillan, 1988 (illustrated by Mary Jane Begin)
- The Three Bears, Macmillan, 1988 (illustrated by Lulu Delacre)
- Timimoto, Macmillan, 1988 (illustrated by Kathy Mitchell)

=== Young adult books ===
Why Leopard Has Spots: Dan Stories from Liberia, Fulcrum, 1998 (co-authored by Won-Ldy Paye and illustrated by Ashley Bryan)

=== Teaching anthologies ===
Teacher’s Read-Aloud Anthologies, Volumes K-12, Macmillan/Mc-Graw Hill, 1993
