= National Autistic Society =

British charity for autistic people

The National Autistic Society
- Founded: 23 January 1962; 64 years ago
- Founder: Group of London-based parents
- Type: Registered charity
- Purpose: Supporting the rights and interests of all autistic people
- Location: London, UK
- Region served: United Kingdom
- Members: 20,000 (2020–present)
- Revenue: £88 million (2012–13)
- Employees: 3,630
- Website: www.autism.org.uk

The National Autistic Society is a charity for autistic people and their families in the United Kingdom. Since 1962, the National Autistic Society has been providing support, guidance and advice, as well as campaigning for improved rights, services and opportunities to help create a society that works for autistic people.

The National Autistic Society is funded through UK government grants and voluntary contributions. The Chief Executive as of 2026 is Caroline Stevens. She took over from Mark Lever in 2019, after being Chief Executive at Kids for six years.

== History ==
The organisation was founded on 23 January 1962 as the Society for Psychotic Children by parents of autistic children living in the area, with the assistance of a member from the Spastics Society (later Scope). Its origins were as a self-help group involving both parents and professionals. It was renamed the Society for Autistic Children later that year, the National Society for Autistic Children in 1966, and the National Autistic Society in 1975.

In 1963, Gerald Gasson, a parent and member of the executive committee, designed the primary symbol for autism: a puzzle piece with a picture of a crying child inside of it, which was first used as logo by the NAS itself. In 1965, The Society School for Autistic Children was established, later renamed as the Sybil Elgar School after their first principal. It was described as "the first of its kind in the UK, and, it is thought, the world", and quickly became an example for how autistic people should be taught, and influenced the TEACCH methods in the US.

== Activities ==
The National Autistic society is a member of the All-Party Parliamentary Group on Autism. It is also a founding member of Autism-Europe.

== Organisation ==
Over 3,000 people work for the National Autistic Society in schools and services as well as training, fundraising, policy and campaigns teams. Its president is Jane Asher and the patron is the Duchess of Edinburgh.

== List of National Autistic Society schools and facilities ==
=== Present schools and facilities ===
The National Autistic Society manages a number of schools in the United Kingdom:

Name of NAS School	Location(s)	County	Year first opened	Notes
Helen Allison School	Gravesend (originally) followed by near Meopham	Kent	1968	Weekly & Termly boarding and Day learning school for pupils/students aged between 4 and 22 years old, which opened 3 years after Sybil Elgar School opened.
Radlett Lodge School	Hatfield (on temporary occasions) and in (mainly) Radlett	Hertfordshire	1974	Weekly boarding and Day learning school for pupils/students aged between 4 and 22 years old, which opened on the same year as Somerset Court.
Robert Ogden School	Thurnscoe near Rotherham	Yorkshire	1976	Weekly & Termly boarding and Day learning school for pupils/students aged between 5 and 19 years old, which opened 2 years after Radlett Lodge School and Somerset Court opened and became the first and only NAS school in the North of England before Church Lawton School.
Sybil Elgar School	Southall (mainly), Ealing (since weekly boarding facilities first opened) and Acton (since sixth form classes were relocated)	Middlesex, West London	1965	Weekly boarding and Day learning school for pupils/students aged between 4 and 22 years old, which took 3 years to construct after the NAS was founded.

The National Autistic Society also runs services for autistic adults.

=== Past schools and facilities ===
The National Autistic Society had also managed 3 former schools in the United Kingdom that no longer existed since the changes of the NAS logos.

Name of NAS School	Location(s)	County	Year first opened	Year last closed	Notes
Anderson School	Somewhere between Bath and Bristol followed by Chigwell	Greater Bristol followed by Essex	2012	2020	Independence school for pupils/students aged between 11 and 19 years old which opened on the NAS's 50th Anniversary, became the second NAS school to open in the West Country after Broomhayes School, had the longest relocation and had closed down at the start of the COVID-19 pandemic having only been opened for 8 years.
Broomhayes School	Westward Ho! followed by Somewhere between Great Torrington and Kingsley near Bideford	Devon	1985	2015	Weekly & Termly boarding and Day learning school for pupils/students aged between 11 and 22 years old which was the first and only NAS school in the West Country before Anderson School and had closed down for putting Kingsley House up for sale when the school got close to its 30th anniversary.
Daldorch House School	Mauchline	Ayrshire	1998	2020	Weekly & Termly boarding and Day learning school for pupils/students aged between 5 and 22 years old which was the only NAS school in Scotland and had closed down at the start of the COVID-19 pandemic having been opened for 22 years.

=== Liberty Academy Trust schools and former NAS facilities ===
Academies first opened by National Autistic Society in the United Kingdom and have then left the National Autistic Society after 10 years or under, and since between 2022 and 2023 are now under the Liberty Academy Trust.

Name of former NAS and now LAT School	Location(s)	County	Year first opened	Notes
Church Lawton School	Church Lawton	Staffordshire/Cheshire boarder	2015	LAT School first opened by the NAS following the closure of Broomhayes School.
Thames Valley School	Reading	Berkshire	2013	LAT School first opened by the NAS following the year of its 50th anniversary.
Vanguard School	Lambeth	Southeast London	2020	LAT School first opened by the NAS following the introduction of a new NAS logo from 2018.

== Awards and nominations ==
Year	Association	Category	Nominee(s)	Result	Refs
2017	Diversity in Media Awards	Marketing Campaign of the Year	Make it Stop	Nominated	

== See also ==
- List of autism organizations
