= Disability in Mexico =

Disability in Mexico affects a substantial minority of the country's population, though estimates of the prevalence vary significantly. According to the 2000 Mexican census, there were 1,795,000 people with disabilities in the country, or 1.8% of the population. A 2017 research paper cites a higher estimate of 6.0%, noting the prevalence was greater at 7.1% among Indigenous peoples of Mexico.

According to the Institute for Health Metrics and Evaluation, the top ten causes of disability in Mexico (by years lived with disability or YLDs) in 2017 were (beginning with the highest): diabetes, headache disorders, lower back pain, neonatal disorders, depressive disorders, blindness and visual impairment, age-related hearing loss, oral disorders, anxiety disorders, and other musculoskeletal disorders. Mexico is a party to the United Nations (UN) Convention on the Rights of Persons with Disabilities, having signed the treaty on 30 March 2007 and ratified it on 17 December 2007.

== History ==
The charity model was predominant during the early modern period but has roots in pre-Hispanic beliefs. Disability in Mexico was often interpreted as divine punishment, misfortune, or the result of supernatural causes such as sorcery. Individuals with disabilities were regarded as unproductive or dangerous and were commonly excluded from social and economic life. Pre-Hispanic records suggest some variation in attitudes, including instances of benign treatment, but also evidence of exclusion.

Institutions such as hospices, orphanages, and hospitals provided care while simultaneously reinforcing exclusion. Eugenic practices, including forced sterilization, and segregation measures like institutionalization, also formed part of this model. Elements of the charity model persist today in stereotypes of pity, non-consensual interventions, and the social exclusion of marginalized groups, especially women, indigenous populations, and people with limited access to education or healthcare.

Beginning in the 19th century, the Mexican state's shift toward secular public welfare redefined disability as a medical issue requiring diagnosis, treatment, and rehabilitation—the rehabilitation model. This approach emphasized the correction of individual deficiencies to promote social integration. The polio epidemics of the 1950s further entrenched rehabilitation efforts, particularly for children with motor disabilities. While this model expanded scientific understanding and therapeutic care, it also reinforced paternalistic and deficit-based attitudes. Legal mechanisms, such as interdiction (substitution of legal decision-making for people with certain disabilities), were formalized. The model continues to influence current policies, including the operation of segregated educational systems and the continued use of involuntary institutionalization.

== Demographics ==
According to the 2000 Mexican census, there were 1,795,000 people with disabilities in the country, or 1.8% of the population. However, a 2005 brief by the Mexican government for a World Health Organization summit argued the methodology used for the census was flawed and led to under-reporting. A 2017 research paper cites a higher estimate of 6.0%, noting the prevalence was greater at 7.1% among Mexicans of indigenous background.

In 2016, 6.13% of the working-age population (18–60 years old) reported having a disability. People with disabilities are less likely to be employed. Only 39.1% of people with disabilities in Mexico over the age of 15 are employed, compared to 64.1% of Mexicans overall. People with disabilities in Mexico tend to be older, have lower educational attainment, and are more likely to reside in rural areas. On average, individuals with disabilities have 9.23 years of schooling, compared to 12.99 years for those without disabilities. They are also less likely to be married and typically live in households with fewer children and higher dependency ratios. Among indigenous populations, the prevalence of disability is notably higher.

== See also ==
- Mexico at the Paralympics
- Disability and poverty
