= European Urban Knowledge Network =

EUKN
- Type: Network of national governments
- Location: The Hague
- Region served: Europe
- Director: Martin Grisel
- Website: www.eukn.eu

The European Urban Knowledge Network (EUKN) is an international organization that promotes sustainable urban development through policy development, research and technical assistance.

The EUKN secretariat is based in The Hague. Member countries are Belgium, Czech Republic, France, Germany, Netherlands, Poland, Slovenia and Spain. The EUKN supports national ministries in developing their National Urban Policies, for example through facilitation of knowledge sharing events. The EUKN also provides support to countries holding the rotating Presidency of the Council of the European Union and has contributed to milestones in European urban policy such as the Leipzig Charter, the New Leipzig Charter and the Ljubljana agreement.

The EUKN also works with stakeholders such as policymakers, academic experts and practitioners. It collaborates with partners on agenda-setting research in urban development.

The EUKN holds legal status as a European Grouping of Territorial Cooperation (EGTC) allowing it engage directly in cross-border cooperation and activities.
