= Estonian Chamber of People with Disabilities =

Estonian organization of people with disabilities

Estonian Chamber of Disabled People
- Eesti Puuetega Inimeste Koda
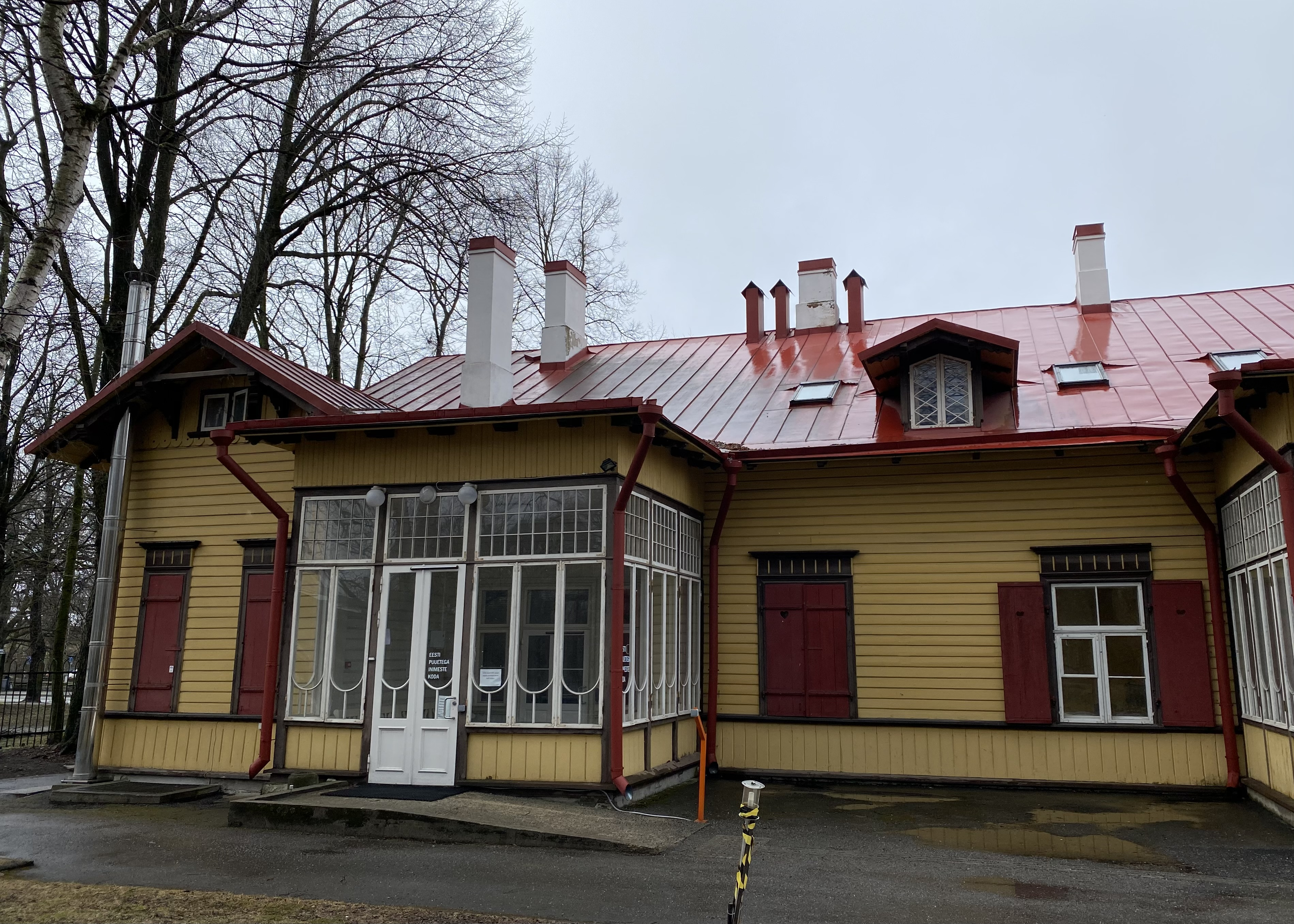
- The office of the Chamber in Tallinn, Estonia
- Formation: February 1993
- Type: Non-profit organizations(NGOs) and foundations
- Headquarters: Address: Toompuiestee 10 10137 Tallinn
- Location: Estonia
- Website: https://www.epikoda.ee/en

The Estonian Chamber of People with Disabilities (Estonian: Eesti Puuetega Inimeste Koda), also translated as Estonian Chamber of Disabled People, is the largest association of people with disabilities in Estonia. The Chamber functions as a non-profit umbrella organization that represents various organizations of people with disabilities in Estonia since 1993. The objective of the activities of the Estonian Chamber of Persons with Disabilities is to improve the livelihoods, quality of life and social inclusion of people with disabilities.

== History ==
The Estonian Chamber of Disabled People was founded in February 1993 and on 27 April 1994 was registered in the business register. It was included in the register of non-profit organizations and foundations on 1 October 1997.

== Board and management ==
Four board presidents and seven directors have led the organization. From 2022, Maarja Krais-Leosk is the executive director of the Estonian Chamber of Persons with Disabilities, and Meelis Joost the president of the board.

== International cooperation ==
The Estonian Chamber of Persons with Disabilities has been cooperating with the European Disability Forum (EDF) since 2000. In 2001, the Chamber was accepted as an observer member with the right to represent the interests of Estonian people with disabilities in the pan-European umbrella organization. The Chamber became a full member in 2004 after Estonia joined the European Union. The Estonian Chamber of Persons with Disabilities reached the international level largely under the leadership of Meelis Joost, a long-time chief foreign affairs specialist and current president of the board.

Since 2008, the Chamber of Persons with Disabilities of Estonia has been a member of the European Patient Forum (EPF) and cooperates with the European umbrella organization for rare diseases, EURORDIS, where the Chamber is represented by the Estonian Prader Willi Syndrome Association. The Chamber also shares its experiences with Georgia, Kazakhstan, and Ukraine organizations. In addition, the Estonian Chamber of Persons with Disabilities is one of the five founders of the Eesti Agrenska Fond, an Estonian-Swedish joint foundation for children and families with disabilities that has been operating since 2001.

== Members ==
The Chamber consists of 16 regional chambers of people with disabilities, 32 unions and national associations for people with specific disabilities and five supporting members. In total, the network represents about 285 organizations of various types and levels.

The organizations of people with disabilities offer training and educational courses. The Estonian Chamber of Disabled People has several sub-organizations such as the Heart Union and Asthma Union, as well as the Union of People with Mental Disabilities. These unions take care of both medical training as well as daily skills and other basic education.
