= Women's Bank =

Finnish women's organization

Women's Bank (Finnish: Naisten Pankki) is a community and a fund within Finn Church Aid set up to support women's sustainable businesses and livelihood in developing countries.

Women's Bank logo

== Origin ==
Women's Bank was founded in 2007, when a group of influential Finnish women went on a trip to Liberia. They had been invited in the war-torn West African country by the Finnish NGO Finn Church Aid. Moved by the condition of women in Liberia, the founders of Women's Bank set out to establish a 'women-to-women' framework. Funds raised by voluntary work would benefit women in developing countries, providing necessary assistance, training and capital to earn their own livelihood.

== Focus on women ==
The project's focus on women is based on the specific, and quite often underprivileged condition of women globally. Women and girls are an untapped resource for development in developing countries. According to Women's Bank and numerous voices in the field, improving the status and the livelihood of women is the single most important way of eradicating poverty and improving the standard of living, benefitting not only individuals or families, but whole communities. Some Women's Bank projects have specific roles for men, they are also included in other facets of the network. Women are in the foreground of Women's Bank however, in an attempt to extend the independence and status enjoyed by many of their Finnish counterparts.

== Recognition ==
In 2012 Women's Bank was awarded the Fundraiser of the Year title in Finland, by the Finnish Fundraising Association (VaLa ry). The same year spokeswoman of Women's Bank Management Group, Ritva Ohmeroluoma, was nominated among the three finalists in the Outstanding Volunteer category of the Global Awards for Fundraising 2012 competition. This was the first time Finnish volunteers were acknowledged internationally for their contributions.

Reeta Sabharwal from the Action For Autism received the first prize for raising funds for the autistic in India. The prizes were awarded in the Netherlands at the International Fundraising Conference.

== Structure ==
=== Local groups ===
Women's Bank has 35 active local groups around Finland. Groups consisting of volunteers organize fundraising activities and events. In 2014 local groups in Finland held over 500 events. Funds thus raised are channeled to projects in developing countries. For a list of local groups, contact details and more information, follow this link(available in Finnish).

=== National campaigns ===
Alongside local events Women's Bank organizes nationwide events every year. A marked example is the 'Walk a Profession for a Woman', a walking event organized in September, often involving other forms of outdoor exercise. Participants donate 30 euros upon signing up; the sum estimated to cover the vocational training (i.e.: profession) of a woman in one of Women's Bank's project locations. In 2014 over €20 000 were raised at the event, which equals to 1991 professions for women in developing countries. 27 local groups of Women's Bank participated in the fundraising event.

=== Funded projects ===
Funds raised by Women's Bank volunteers go to the following targets (administered by FCA):

- Projects improving women's income, skills and rights
- Microloans, upgrading skills and other projects in support of women's business activities
- Other pilot projects focusing on businesses set up by women

=== Implementation ===
Women's Bank's projects are evaluated and carried out by Finn Church Aid, a Finnish NGO with decades of experience in humanitarian aid, development cooperation and a wide network of professionals available for assisting project tasks. Women's Bank's fund is administered by Finn Church Aid.
