= Action for Autism =

Non-profit autism society in India

- Formation: 1991
- Type: Non-profit organization
- Headquarters: New Delhi, India
- Region served: India
- Website: www.autism-india.org

Action for Autism (AFA) is an Indian non-profit, education, training and advocacy organisation. Founded in 1991, AFA started out as a parent support group, with a focus on raising awareness about autism.

In March 1994 AFA opened "Open Door", a special school for children with autism. They also provided counselling services for parents.

AFA works through direct services, advocacy, and research to improve the lives of children with autism and their families. AFA is also committed to assisting other countries in South Asia achieve legal recognition of autism and develop services for children and families. To more effectively orchestrate national activities for autism, it was relocated to the AFA National Centre for Advocacy Research and Training in 2006.

== See also ==
- Autism therapies
- apki Antara
- List of autism organizations
