= Sybil Elgar =

British educationist

Sybil Elgar (10 June 1914 – 8 January 2007) was the first special-education teacher for those with autism in the United Kingdom.

In 1962, she began a school for autistic children in the basement of her London home. She helped to found the National Autistic Society, whose first school for pupils with autism was later named the Sibyl Elgar School in her honour. In 1974, Elgar and the parents of some of her students founded the first residential community for adults with autism, Somerset Court in Brent Knoll, Somerset. She was appointed MBE in 1975, and in 1984 she retired. Elgar died on 8 January 2007 at the age of 92.
