= Grace Kim (architect) =

American architect

Grace Kim is an American architect who is founding principal of Schemata Workshop, an architecture firm in Seattle, Washington that works toward the improvement of communities. She has focused in her career on the topics of cohousing, mentorship, and alternative housing models for seniors and those with disabilities. She is the author of The Survival Guide to Architectural Internship and Career Development, a work described as demystifying the architectural internship process. In 2008, she received the National AIA Young Architect Award. She is currently a commissioner of the Seattle Planning Commission.

== Early life and education ==
Kim earned her B.Arch from Washington State University and her M.Arch from the University of Washington. It was through this academic path that she began to study cohousing. She was first exposed to the idea in the early 90s through a presentation by Danish architecture professor Jorn Orum-Nielsen during a study-abroad program at the Architectural Association in London, alongside her Schemata Workshop cofounder and future husband Mike Mariano. Prior to starting Schemata Workshop, Kim interned at Skidmore, Owings, and Merrill (SOM).

== Career highlights and design rationale ==
Kim is perhaps most well known for her teachings on cohousing. During her early architectural practice years in the late 90s, she researched the Cohousing typology in Denmark. (Bofellesskap" is the Danish word that is translated to "cohousing".) She subsequently served on the founding team for Capitol Hill Urban Cohousing in Seattle and on the board of the US Cohousing Association nationally.

For Kim, cohousing—in the intentionality of people to live collaboratively—provides a possible solution to the worldwide problems of loneliness and isolation. Kim spoke in Vancouver at an April 2017 TED talk on the topic of cohousing. In this TED talk, she asserted that cohousing can make us happier through an intentionality on relationships that can work as an antidote to isolation. She states:

Cohousing starts with a shared intention to live collaboratively, and intention is the single most important characteristic that differentiates cohousing from any other housing model...This intention has been expressed in some of the communities I've visited in the careful selection of furniture, lighting, and acoustic materials to support eating together; in the careful visual location and visual access to kids' play areas around and inside a common house; and in the consideration of scale and distribution of social gathering nodes in and around the community to support our daily lives. All of these spaces help contribute to and elevate the sense of communitas—the spirit of community—in each community.

Kim began putting these ideas on cohousing into practice in developing Capitol Hill Cohousing, a five-story mixed-use cohousing project in Seattle that features nine 2-3 bedroom homes oriented around a central courtyard on a 4500 ft^{2} urban infill lot in the Capitol Hill Neighborhood of Seattle. Key communal features of the project include shared balconies, a community dining hall and kitchen, and a collective rooftop garden. The result is a building that, for many residents and visitors, feels very alive. For Kim, who lives in one of the homes and works on the ground floor in Schemata's offices, the project is an opportunity and commitment of environmental awareness, intergenerational friendships, neighborhood partnerships, and healthy community. She was involved in the project from ideation through completion—from approximately 2007 to 2016—as a kind of architect-developer and consensus builder, helping clients and project stakeholders envision how a completed project will be experienced.

Capitol Hill Cohousing is not Schemata's only cohousing projects: the firm has built Daybreak Cohousing in Portland; Skagit Cohousing in Anacortes, Washington; and Sunnyside Village Cohousing in Marysville, Washington.

== Additional Work with Schemata ==
- St. Francis House, Seattle, 2021
- Capital Hill TOD, Settle, 2020
- R&D Interbay, Seattle, 2017
- Waterton Mixed-Use, Seattle, 2017
- Uptown 11 Mixed-Use, Seattle, 2016
- Sola 16, Seattle, 2016
- Kirkland Avenue Modular, Renton, WA, 2015
