= Autism-Europe =

International non-profit association

- Autism-Europe aisbl
- Abbreviation: AE
- Pronunciation: IPA: /ˈɔːtɪzəm/ – /ˈjʊəɹəp/
- Formation: 1983; 43 years ago
- Founded at: Ghent, Belgium
- Legal status: Nonprofit organisation
- Headquarters: Brussels, Belgium
- Region served: Europe
- Methods: activism, education, advocacy
- Fields: Autism
- Official language: English, French
- President: Harald Neerland
- Director: Aurélie Baranger
- Affiliations: Belgium, Czech Rep., Croatia, Denmark, Finland, France, Germany, Greece, Hungary, Iceland, Ireland, Lithuania, Luxembourg, Malta, Netherlands, Norway, Portugal, Romania, Russia, Serbia, Slovakia, Spain, Sweden, Switzerland, United Kingdom, Bulgaria, Estonia, Italy, Slovenia, Turkey, Ukraine, Albania, Kuwait, Morocco, Saudi Arabia
- Website: http://www.autismeurope.org/

Autism-Europe is an international non-profit association located in Brussels, Belgium. The organisation is co-funded by the European Union.

The association's mission is to advance the rights of autistic people in all areas of life, through advocacy work and raising awareness. This includes representing autistic people in European institutions, promoting access to habilitation and education, and promoting the exchange of information, good practices, and experiences. Autism-Europe operates as an umbrella organisation, bringing together 80 autism organisations in 34 European countries, including 26 European Union member states.

== History ==
=== 1980s and the beginnings ===
Autism-Europe was founded in 1983 by a group of national and regional parents' associations. It was established following the first European Conference of Associations of Parents in Ghent, Belgium, in 1980.

Under its first president, Jean Charles Salmon, the organisation identified its three main functions as monitoring, advocacy and recommendation; more specifically:

- to closely observe the treatment of, and care provided for, people with autism;
- to advocate to those responsible for the treatment and status of people with autism;
- to create proposals with the aim of promoting the well-being and interests of people with autism.

Autism-Europe was founded in the context of a changing public understanding of all disabilities. A new conception of disability was emerging, called the "social model of disability" (as opposed to the "medical model of disability"), which aimed to redefine disability to focus on the relationship between people and their environment. This understanding is based on the idea that social barriers must be removed to enable people with disabilities to participate fully in society, becoming active members who can represent themselves and exercise their rights.

=== 1990s ===
==== Rights charter ====
In 1992, Autism-Europe members created the "Charter for Persons with Autism", a charter that outlined the rights of autistic people in all aspects of life. Following that, Autism-Europe decided that, for the charter to have relevance at the European level, it must also have political endorsement. Autism-Europe therefore campaigned for political support and approval for the charter. The charter was adopted as a written declaration by the European Parliament in 1996.

=== 2000s ===
==== Collective complaint on the right to education in France ====
Autism-Europe launched the first collective complaint before the Council of Europe on behalf of disabled people in 2002. Autism-Europe was represented by Evelyne Friedel, a lawyer with an autistic son.

In 2004, the Council of Europe publicly announced its condemnation of France for having failed its educational obligations to autistic people under the revised European Social Charter. The Council of Europe's decision put pressure on France and other countries in the Council of Europe to live up to their obligations under the European Social Charter by providing education for autistic people, both within mainstream and specialised schools.

Following the decision, the French government launched its first Autism Plan, which included measures to create new facilities and include autistic children in mainstream schools.

==== United Nations Convention on the Rights of Persons with Disabilities ====
In 2006, after four years of negotiations, the United Nations General Assembly adopted a new convention specifically for disabled people. The Convention on the Rights of Persons with Disabilities reaffirms that all people with all types of disabilities, including autism, must enjoy all human rights and fundamental freedoms. It is legally binding for countries that ratify it.

Autism-Europe took part in the consultation process leading to the drafting and adoption of the convention, and continues taking part in the review process. The convention has since been ratified by most countries in Europe, as well as the European Union, and therefore must be implemented in these countries and within the European Union's fields of competence.

==== The Council of Europe's recommendations on education ====
Following the collective complaint on the right to education in France in 2002, the Council of Europe established a group of experts – of which Autism-Europe was a member – to look into the issue of access to education for autistic children. This resulted in the Council of Europe's Resolution ResAP (2007)4 on the education and social inclusion of children and young people with autism, which was adopted as a recommendation in 2009 (CM/ Rec(2009)9).

While this recommendation is not binding for the members of the Council of Europe, it applies pressure to implement policies promoting access to education and the inclusion of autistic people.

=== 2010s ===
==== European Parliament's Written Declaration on Autism ====
In September 2015, the European Parliament officially adopted the Written Declaration on Autism, co-signed by 418 Members of the European Parliament. The document, co-drafted by Autism-Europe, calls on the European Union and its member states to adopt a European strategy for autism that will support accurate detection and diagnosis across Europe, promote evidence-based treatment and support services for all ages, foster research and prevalence studies, and encourage the exchange of best practices.

== Activities ==
Autism-Europe operates as an umbrella organisation, bringing together 80 member autism organisations in 34 European countries, including 26 European Union Member States. It works at raising public awareness and influencing European decision-makers on issues relating to the rights of autistic and other disabled people.

Autism-Europe has established a structured dialogue with the European Institutions and is also active with the World Health Organization and the United Nations. It also participates as a non-governmental organisation in the Council of Europe.

Autism-Europe's main activities revolve around its advocacy work at the European Union and national level, awareness-raising campaigns, and dissemination of information. Its main publication is its biannual LINK magazine, which presents news on the subject of autism and member activity. Autism-Europe also publishes research publications to support its advocacy activities, which have recently focused on education, employment and ageing. Every three years, Autism-Europe organize an international congress dedicated to sharing knowledge regarding advances in the field of autism.

== See also ==
- Autism
- Asperger syndrome
- European Union
- List of autism organizations
