= Bryn Gweled, Pennsylvania =

Bryn Gweled
- Intentional Community
- Location within Pennsylvania Location within the United States
- Coordinates: 40.16588°N 75.01464°W
- Country: United States
- State: Pennsylvania
- County: Bucks
- Township: Upper Southampton Township
- Founded: 1940

Bryn Gweled is a small community in Upper Southampton Township, Bucks County, Pennsylvania. Described as an "intentionally cooperative community", Bryn Gweled Homesteads consists of 78 privately owned homes on 240 acres (0.97 km^{2}) of collectively owned and managed land as well as a community center.

The self-governing community was founded in 1940 by thirteen mostly Quaker families from the Philadelphia area. The name of the community means "Hill of Vision" in Welsh. The community maintains its founders' vision of collective responsibility, modified consensus-style management, and racial diversity, and has been cited as an example of community-based decision-making in action.

Some of the house architecture was created by various students of the famous American architect Frank Lloyd Wright such as Robert Forsythe Bishop and others who went on to have distinguished further careers. The homes are located on two acre plots, nestled into fields and forests, an oasis from the surrounding Philadelphia suburban sprawl. Several of the homes feature unique architectural elements such as heated floors, exposed wooden beams, wide open interior spaces, central fireplaces typical of organic architecture and Usonian homes.

== Notable people ==
Margaret H. Lippert, an award-winning author of books and anthologies

Mario Capecchi, Nobel Prize-winning molecular geneticist
