= Community-led housing =

Way to let future residents design and develop housing

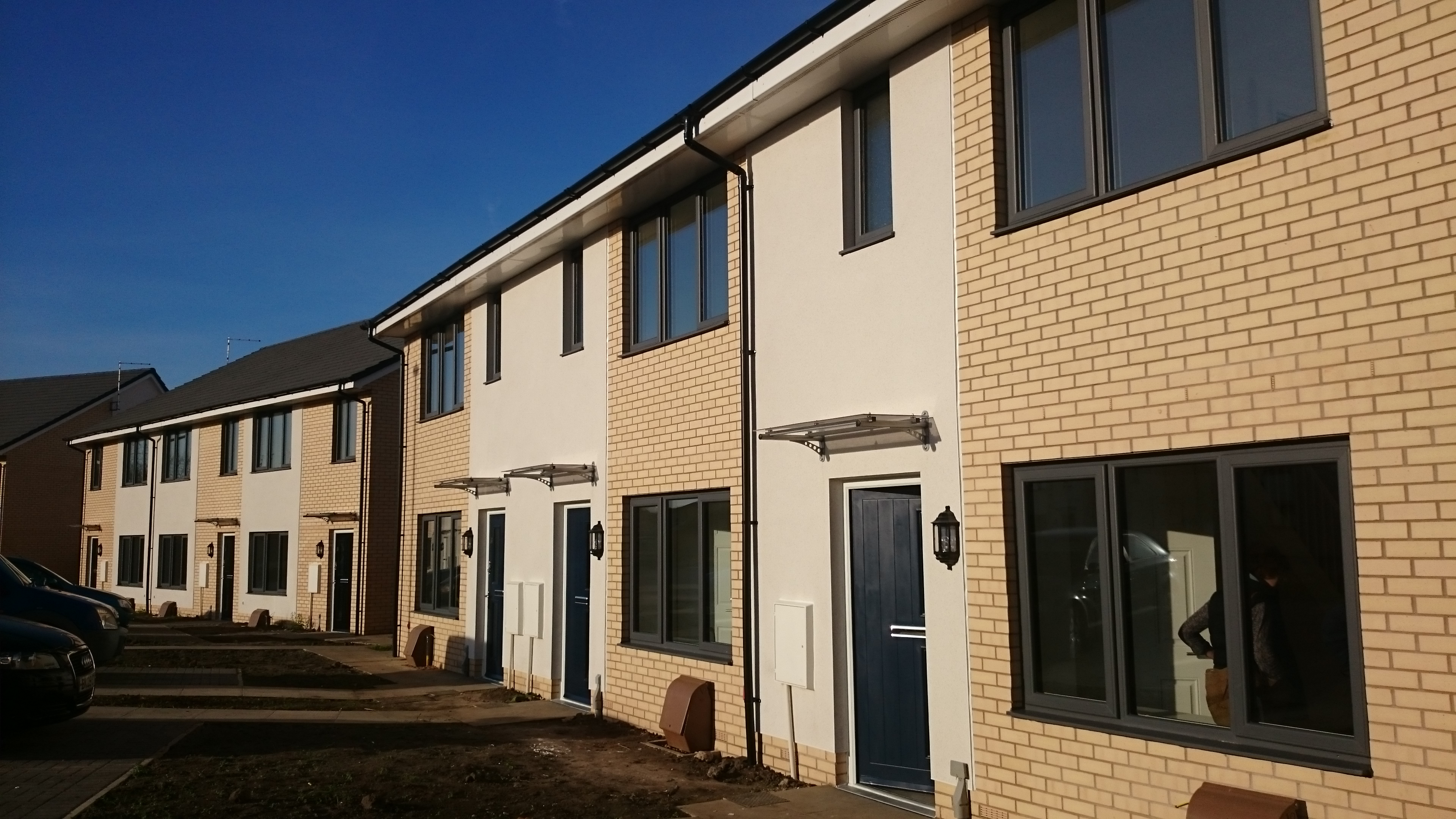
A 13 acres (5.3 ha) community-led housing project in Leicester.

Community-led housing (baugruppen: Germany, projets d'habitat participatif: France, habitat groupé: Belgium. social production of habitat: Latin America) is a method of forming future residents into a 'building group' who contribute to the design and development of new housing to meet their longer term needs, rather than leaving all design decisions to a developer looking to maximise the immediate financial return.

Working together in advance of construction helps to create a sense of community as members collaborate to identify their own priorities when designing their homes and shared spaces.

Groups of this sort were developing housing in Berlin in the early 2000s as the city was rebuilt following German reunification and emerging from a long tradition of self-initiated, community-oriented living and the shared responsibility of building in Germany.

== Benefits ==
Identified benefits of community-led housing include:

- Increased community confidence and cohesion: These are developed through the opportunity for the community to work together to influence their housing as formal stakeholders.
- Skills development and employment: This can include the development of practical skills that help to develop the homes, such as plastering, plumbing and tiling. It can also include skills such as project management and community mobilisation in the planning of homes.
- Addressing social challenges: Community-led housing projects can help to address social problems such as homelessness and loneliness. For example, certain projects help to tackle the challenges of supporting an elderly population.
- Provision for a long-term legally protected benefit to the local or specified community via retained income from the housing provided.

== Key principles ==
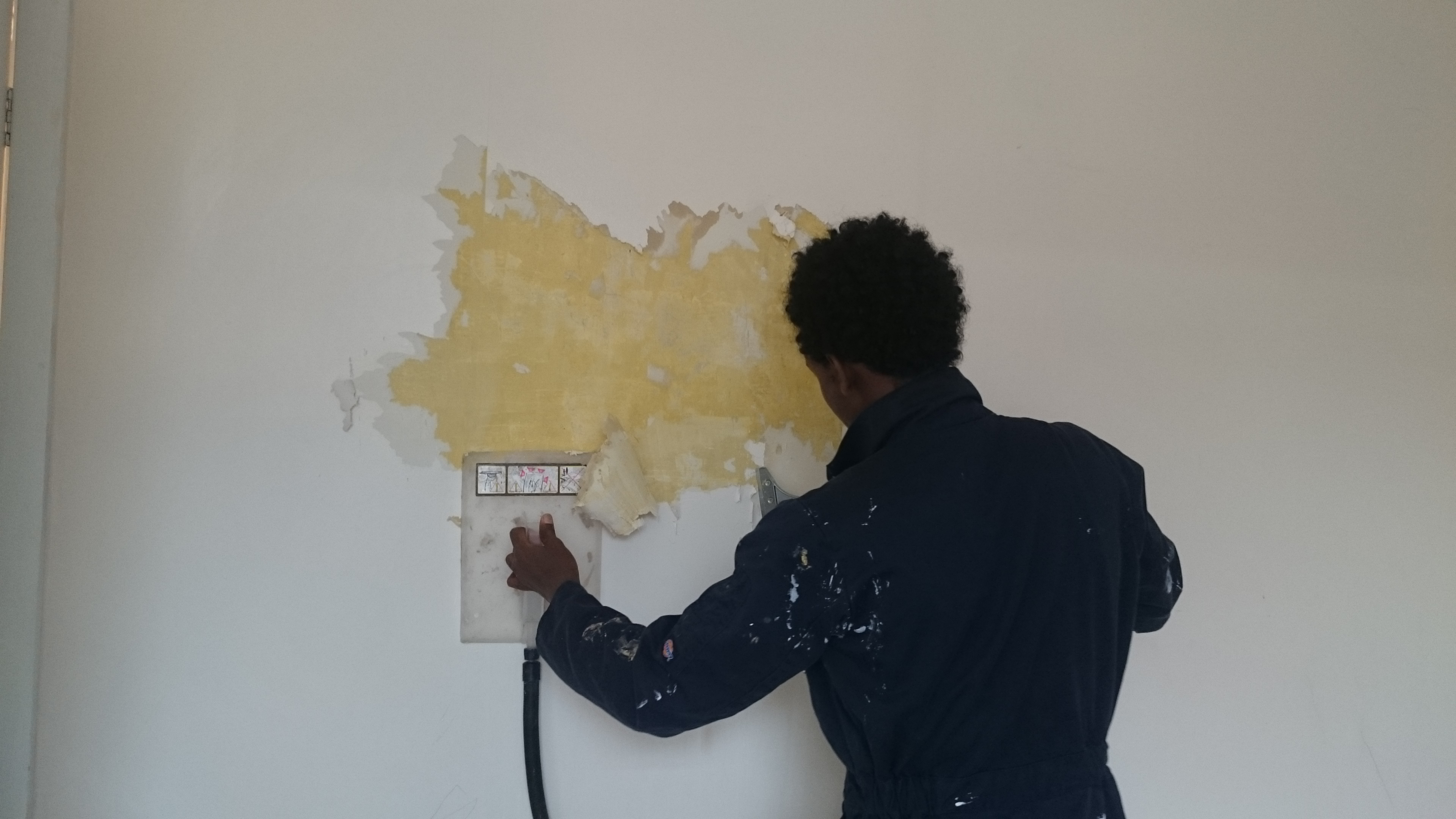
A volunteer working to renovate an empty home with Canopy Housing, a community-led housing project in the North of England

In 2016 key principles for community-led housing were developed collaboratively with several organisations representing community-led housing as part of an alliance building activity coordinated by Building and Social Housing Foundation (BSHF).

The key principles are:

- The community is integrally involved throughout the process in key decisions like what is provided, where, and for who. They don't necessarily have to initiate the conversation, or build homes themselves.
- There is a presumption that the community group will take a long term formal role in the ownership, stewardship or management of the homes.
- The benefits of the scheme to the local area and/or specified community group are clearly defined and legally protected in perpetuity.

Individual schemes are designed to fit the needs of the communities involved and achieve specific outcomes and wider benefits.

The National Planning Policy Framework 2024 definition of community-led development can be summarised as "a development taken forward by, or with, a not-for-profit organisation, that is primarily for the purpose of meeting the needs of its members or the wider local community... The organisation should be created, managed and democratically controlled by its members, and membership of the organisation should be open to all beneficiaries and prospective beneficiaries of that organisation. The organisation should own, manage or steward the development in a manner consistent with its purpose... The benefits of the development to the community should be clearly defined and consideration given to how those benefits can be protected over time..."

== Terminology ==
Terms used for this concept around the world include:

- Baugruppe or Baugruppen, which translates literally from German as 'building group'
- Social production of habitat (internationally used)
- Projets d'habitat participatif (France)
- Habitat groupé (Belgium)

== Legal models ==
Common legal structures used to provide community-led housing in the UK include:

- Charitable incorporated organisation (CIO)
- Community association
- Community benefit society (CBS or Bencom)
- Community charitable trust
- Community housing association
- Community interest company (CIC)
- Community land trust (CLT)
- Company limited by guarantee
- Council TMO
- Development trust
- Housing association TMO
- Housing cooperative
- Industrial and provident society
- Mutual home ownership society
- Organisations with charitable status

== See also ==
- Affordable housing
- Cohousing
- Cooperative
