= World Habitat Awards =

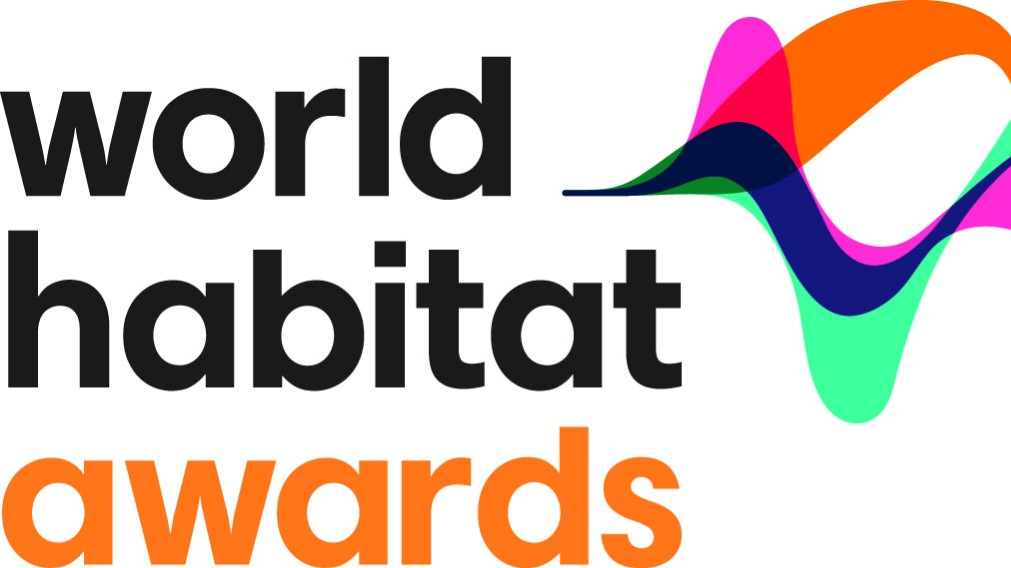
The logo of ‘World Habitat Awards’.

The World Habitat Awards were established in 1985 by the Building and Social Housing Foundation as part of its contribution to the United Nations' International Year of Shelter for the Homeless in 1987.

Two awards are given annually to projects from the Global South as well as the North that provide practical, innovative and sustainable solutions to current housing needs, which are capable of being transferred or adapted for use elsewhere.

== Overview ==
Entries to the Awards are encouraged from housing projects and programmes that:

- demonstrate practical, innovative and sustainable solutions to current housing challenges;
- can be transferred or adapted in other countries across the world;
- are already being implemented or are completed i.e. not at design stage or in the very early stages of development; and
- view the term habitat from a broad perspective and bring a range of other benefits. We particularly encourage entries from projects and programmes that are addressing the climate emergency. Other benefits of interest to us

include: income generation; social inclusion; community and individual empowerment; health benefits; capacity building and or education.

== See also ==
- List of economics awards
