= National Register of Historic Places listings in Louisa County, Virginia =

Location of Louisa County in Virginia

This is a list of the National Register of Historic Places listings in Louisa County, Virginia.

This is intended to be a complete list of the properties and districts on the National Register of Historic Places in Louisa County, Virginia, United States. The locations of National Register properties and districts for which the latitude and longitude coordinates are included below, may be seen in an online map.

There are 23 properties and districts listed on the National Register in the county, including 1 National Historic Landmark.

This National Park Service list is complete through NPS recent listings posted October 2, 2026.

== Current listings ==
	Name on the Register	Image	Date listed	Location	City or town	Description
1	Anderson-Foster House	Anderson-Foster House	November 17, 1978 (#78003028)	North of Holly Grove on Chapel Dr. 37°48′04″N 77°49′05″W	Holly Grove	
2	Baker-Strickler House	Baker-Strickler House	February 18, 2009 (#09000046)	10074 W. Gordon Ave. 38°07′41″N 78°12′14″W	Gordonsville	
3	Bloomington	Bloomington	August 11, 2004 (#04000850)	Bloomington Ln. 37°58′32″N 77°59′32″W	Louisa	
4	Boswell's Tavern	Boswell's Tavern	November 25, 1969 (#69000257)	Junction of U.S. Route 15 and State Route 22; 38°04′12″N 78°11′02″W	Gordonsville	
5	Boxley Place	Boxley Place	April 4, 2007 (#07000273)	103 Ellisville Dr. 38°01′40″N 78°00′19″W	Louisa	
6	Bright Hope Baptist Church and Cemetery	Bright Hope Baptist Church and Cemetery	February 2, 2026 (#100012676)	9833 Poindexter Road; 38°03′02″N 78°04′44″W	Louisa vicinity	
7	Cuckoo	Cuckoo	August 19, 1994 (#94000550)	Junction of U.S. Routes 33 and 522; 37°57′12″N 77°53′59″W	Mineral	Federal-style home with a Colonial-style portico built for physician Henry Pendleton about 1819.
8	Cuckoo Elementary School		November 24, 2025 (#100012337)	7133 Jefferson Highway; 37°56′46″N 77°53′26″W	Mineral	
9	Duke House	Duke House	August 16, 2007 (#07000830)	2729 Diggstown Rd. 37°56′44″N 77°46′23″W	Bumpass	
10	Grassdale	Grassdale	July 2, 1973 (#73002035)	West of Trevilians off U.S. Route 15; 38°02′36″N 78°11′50″W	Trevilians	
11	Green Springs	Green Springs	June 30, 1972 (#72001406)	0.2 miles (0.32 km) south of Green Springs Rd. and 1.5 miles (2.4 km) southwest of its junction with Jack Jouett Rd. 38°00′18″N 78°10′50″W	Trevilians	
12	Green Springs Historic District	Green Springs Historic District	March 7, 1973 (#73002036)	Northeast of Zion Crossroads on U.S. Route 15; 38°01′02″N 78°09′30″W	Zion Crossroads	
13	Harris-Poindexter House and Store	Harris-Poindexter House and Store	May 22, 2002 (#02000534)	81 Tavern Rd. 37°59′07″N 77°49′16″W	Mineral	
14	Hawkwood	Hawkwood	September 17, 1970 (#70000809)	South of Gordonsville off U.S. Route 15; 38°00′57″N 78°11′41″W	Gordonsville	
15	Ionia	Ionia	June 30, 1972 (#72001405)	0.1 miles (0.16 km) east of Jack Jouett Rd. and 0.8 miles (1.3 km) north of its junction with Poindexter Rd. 38°00′42″N 78°08′46″W	Trevilians	
16	Jerdone Castle	Jerdone Castle	October 4, 1984 (#84000042)	North of Bumpas on Jerdone Island; 38°00′25″N 77°45′05″W	Bumpass	
17	Longwood	Longwood	September 14, 2002 (#02000998)	924 Longwood Dr. 38°03′43″N 78°13′16″W	Gordonsville	
18	Louisa County Courthouse	Louisa County Courthouse	December 28, 1990 (#90001998)	Junction of State Route 208 and Main St. 38°01′28″N 78°00′13″W	Louisa	
19	Louisa High School	Louisa High School	August 24, 2011 (#11000605)	212 Fredericksburg Ave. 38°01′31″N 77°59′52″W	Louisa	
20	Mineral Historic District	Mineral Historic District	April 8, 2005 (#05000271)	Roughly along Mineral, Louisa, Lee, Richmond, Albemarle, Pendleton, Piedmon, Old Tolersville, S. Cecilia, et al. 38°00′29″N 77°54′30″W	Mineral	
21	Providence Presbyterian Church	Providence Presbyterian Church	April 13, 1973 (#73002034)	Northwest of Gum Spring off U.S. Route 250; 37°47′08″N 77°54′17″W	Gum Spring	
22	Shady Grove School	Shady Grove School	June 11, 2009 (#09000416)	2925 Three Chopt Rd. 37°45′43″N 77°52′29″W	Gum Spring	
23	Westend	Westend	September 17, 1970 (#70000810)	South of the junction of State Route 22 and Nolting Rd. 38°02′45″N 78°10′15″W	Trevilians	

== See also ==
- List of National Historic Landmarks in Virginia
- National Register of Historic Places listings in Virginia
