= Virginia State Route 208 =

State highway in northeastern Virginia, US

State Route 208

Route information
- Maintained by VDOT
- Length: 47.35 mi (76.20 km)
- Existed: 1950–present

Major junctions
- West end: US 250 / SR 659 at Ferncliff
- I-64 at Ferncliff; US 33 / SR 22 in Louisa; US 522 in Mineral
- East end: US 1 / US 1 Bus. at Four Mile Fork

Location
- Country: United States
- State: Virginia
- Counties: Louisa, Spotsylvania

Highway system
- Virginia Routes; Interstate; US; Primary; Secondary; Byways; History; HOT lanes
← SR 207	→ SR 209

State Route 208 (SR 208) is a primary state highway in the U.S. state of Virginia. The state highway runs 47.35 miles (76.20 km) from U.S. Route 250 (US 250) at Ferncliff east to US 1 and US 1 Business at Four Mile Fork. SR 208 is a major southwest–northeast highway through Louisa and Spotsylvania counties. The state highway connects the counties' respective seats of Louisa and Spotsylvania Courthouse, where the old route of the highway is SR 208 Business, with each other and with Fredericksburg near the highway's eastern terminus. SR 208 also has a direct connection with Interstate 64 (I-64) at Ferncliff and an indirect connection to I-95 near Fredericksburg.

== Route description ==
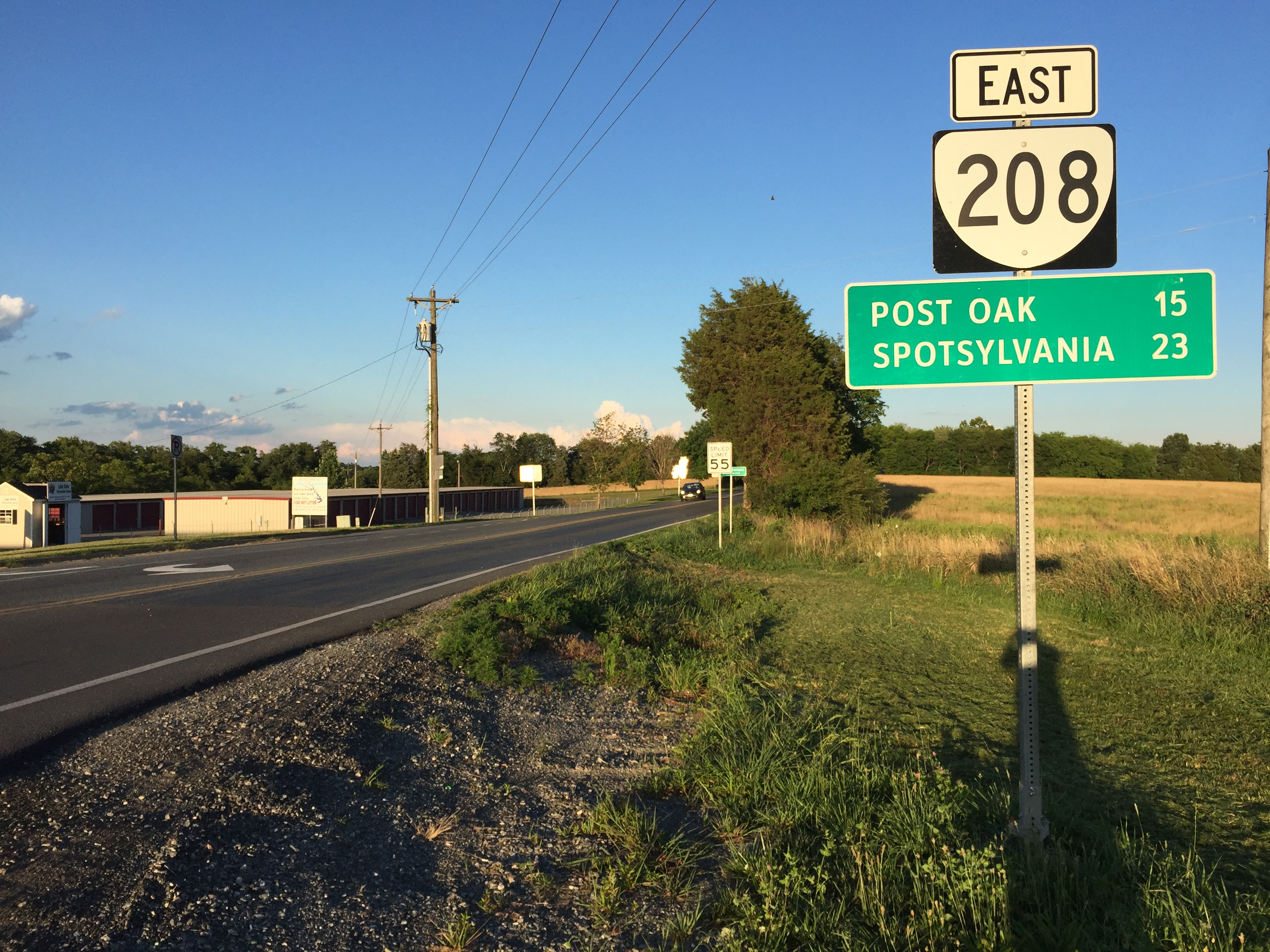
View east along SR 208 at US 522 in Wares Crossroads in northern Louisa County

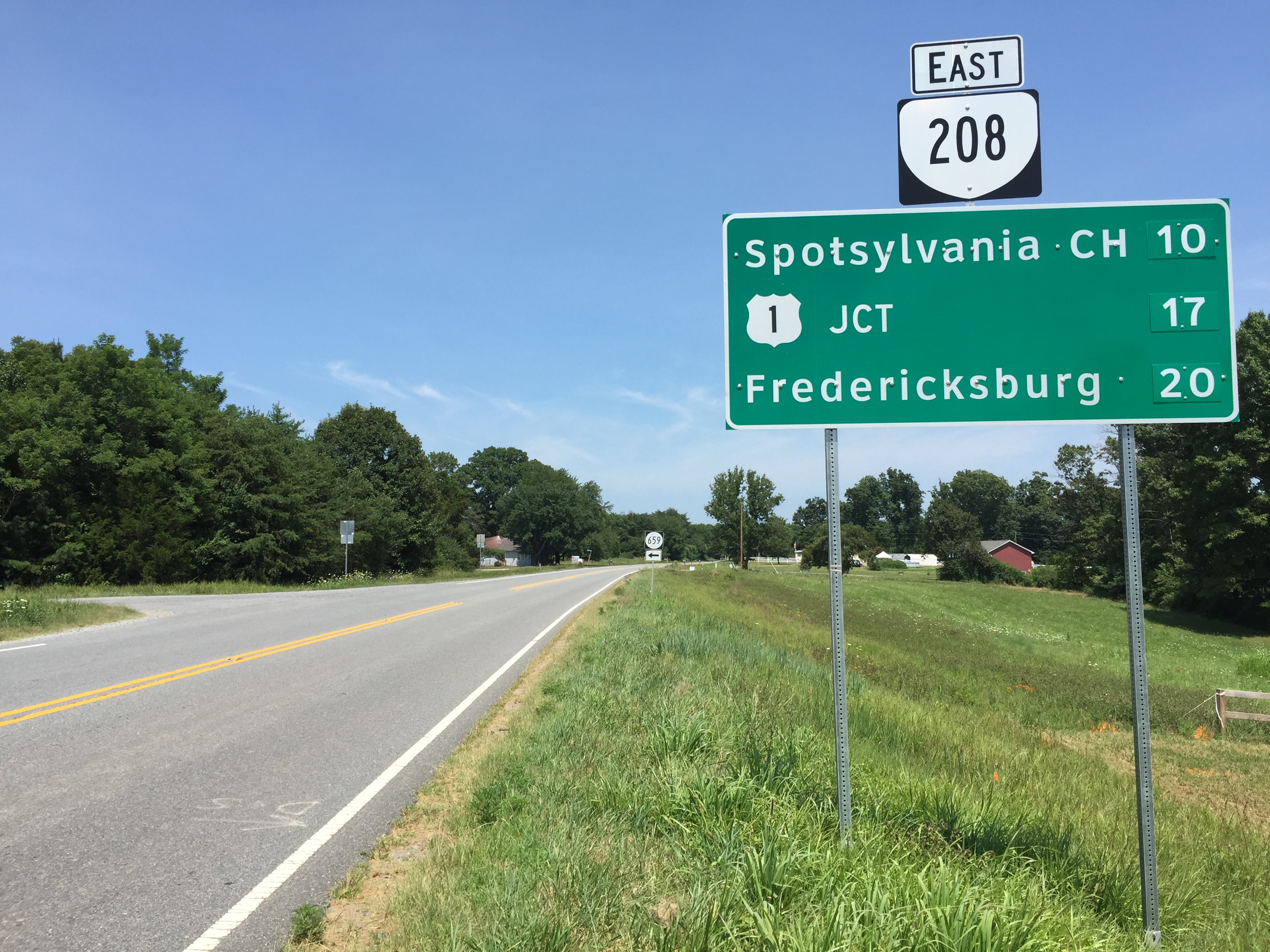
View east along SR 208 near Brokenburg

SR 208 begins at an intersection with US 250 (Three Notch Road) in the hamlet of Ferncliff along the southern edge of Louisa County. The state highway heads north as Courthouse Road, a two-lane undivided road that passes through a diamond interchange with I-64 and crosses the South Anna River. SR 208 enters the town of Louisa and intersects US 33 and SR 22 (Main Street) at the east end of downtown. The three highways run concurrently east until US 33 splits southeast as Jefferson Highway toward Richmond. SR 208 and SR 22 continues east along Davis Highway, which passes to the north of Louisa County Airport and parallels CSX's Piedmont Subdivision to the town of Mineral. The highways enter the town from the north as Piedmont Avenue. SR 22 reaches its eastern terminus at the highways' intersection with US 522, which heads south along the same roadway but with a different name, Mineral Avenue. Eastbound SR 208 and northbound US 522 turn east onto 1st Street and have a grade crossing of the railroad, then turn north onto Louisa Avenue.

SR 208 and US 522 head north from Mineral as Zachary Taylor Highway. The two highways split, which the U.S. Highway continuing northwest toward Culpeper and the state highway heading east on New Bridge Road. SR 208 uses the New Bridge to cross Lake Anna, an impoundment of the North Anna River, northwest of the North Anna Nuclear Generating Station and southeast of Lake Anna State Park. SR 208 continues through Spotsylvania County as Courthouse Road, which passes through Brokenburg and crosses the Ta River, one of four main tributaries of the Mattaponi River on its way to Post Oak, where the highway makes a sharp turn east at SR 606 (Post Oak Road). The state highway passes Spotsylvania High School before turning north at SR 648 (Block House Road); Courthouse Road continues east as SR 208 Business toward Snell.

SR 208 follows Block House Road north across the Po River, another Mattaponi tributary, and expands to a four-lane divided highway south of where SR 648 splits north on Block House Road. The state highway continues northeast and bypasses Spotsylvania Courthouse to the west. Just north of the county seat, SR 208 receives the other end of SR 208 Business (Courthouse Road) and passes the entrance to the Spotsylvania Courthouse unit of the Fredericksburg and Spotsylvania National Military Park. The state highway continues northeast as Courthouse Road, which crosses the Ni River, the northernmost Mattaponi tributary, and Massaponax Creek and passes through the suburban area southwest of Fredericksburg. SR 208 crosses over I-95 with no access before reaching its northern terminus at a four-leg intersection with US 1 (Jefferson Davis Highway) and US 1 Business (Lafayette Boulevard) at Four Mile Fork. The business route heads northeast into the independent city of Fredericksburg. US 1 connects SR 208 with I-95 and US 17 via an interchange between Four Mile Fork and Massaponax to the south.

== Major intersections ==
County	Location	mi	km	Destinations	Notes
Louisa	Ferncliff	0.00	0.00	US 250 (Three Notch Road) / SR 659 (Kents Store Road) – Columbia, Richmond, Charlottesville, Kents Store	Western terminus; former SR 27 south
Louisa		0.38	0.61	I-64 – Charlottesville, Richmond	Exit 143 (I-64)
Louisa	Louisa	9.33	15.02	US 33 west / SR 22 west (East Main Street) – Trevilians	West end of concurrencies with US 33 and SR 22
Louisa	Louisa	9.73	15.66	US 33 east (Jefferson Highway) – Cuckoo, Richmond	East end of concurrency with US 33
Louisa	Mineral	14.94	24.04	US 522 south (Mineral Avenue) / SR 1112 (First Street) – Cuckoo	Eastern terminus of SR 22; west end of concurrency with US 522
Louisa	Mineral			SR 618 (East First Street) – Fredericks Hall, Bumpass, Airport	
Louisa	Wares Crossroads	20.37	32.78	US 522 north (Zachary Taylor Highway) – Culpeper, Front Royal	East end of concurrency with US 522
Lake Anna		23.99	38.61	New Bridge	
Spotsylvania	Post Oak			SR 606 north (Post Oak Road)	west end of SR 606 overlap; former SR 209 west
Spotsylvania				SR 606 south (Morris Road / SR 208 Bus. east)	east end of SR 606 overlap; former SR 208 east
Spotsylvania				SR 613 (Brock Road)	former SR 210
Spotsylvania		41.36	66.56	SR 208 Bus. west (Courthouse Road) – Spotsylvania Courthouse	former SR 208 west
Spotsylvania	Four Mile Fork	47.35	76.20	US 1 (Jefferson Davis Highway) / US 1 Bus. north (Lafayette Boulevard) to I-95 – Fredericksburg, Washington, Richmond	Eastern terminus
1.000 mi = 1.609 km; 1.000 km = 0.621 mi: Concurrency terminus

== Spotsylvania Courthouse business route ==
State Route 208 Business
- Location: Post Oak – Spotsylvania Courthouse
- Length: 7.09 mi (11.41 km)

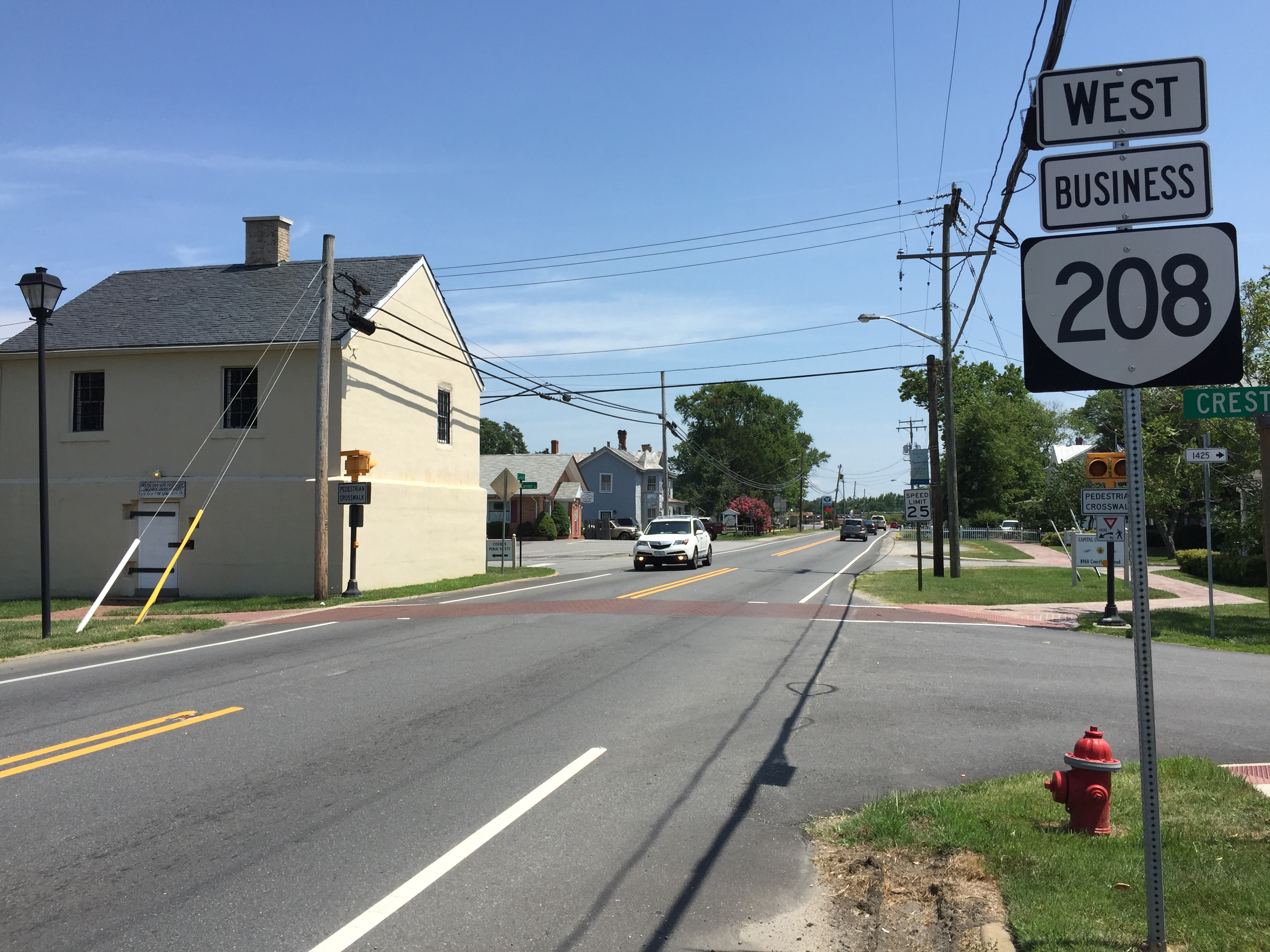
View west along SR 208 Business in Spotsylvania Courthouse

State Route 208 Business (SR 208 Business) is a business route of SR 208 in Spotsylvania County. Known as Courthouse Road, the highway runs 7.09 miles (11.41 km) from SR 208 near Post Oak east and north to SR 208 in Spotsylvania Courthouse. SR 208 Business begins at its intersection with SR 208 (Courthouse Road) and SR 648 (Block House Road) east of Post Oak. The two-lane highway heads east to the hamlet of Snell, where the highway turns north at an oblique intersection whose south and east legs are SR 738 (Partlow Road) and SR 606 (Morris Road), respectively. SR 208 Business crosses the Po River at Snells Bridge and enters Spotsylvania Courthouse. There, the highway turns northeast where SR 613 (Brock Road) continues straight. SR 208 Business passes the county courthouse and other county offices before reaching its northern terminus at SR 208 (Courthouse Road) north of the village.
