= U.S. Route 33 in Virginia =

Section of US highway in Virginia

U.S. Route 33
- US 33 highlighted in red

Route information
- Maintained by VDOT
- Length: 135.60 mi (218.23 km)
- Existed: 1938–present

Major junctions
- West end: US 33 near Rawley Springs
- US 11 in Harrisonburg; I-81 in Harrisonburg; US 340 in Elkton; US 29 in Ruckersville; US 15 in Gordonsville; US 522 in Cuckoo; I-295 near Glen Allen; I-64 in Dumbarton; US 250 in Richmond
- East end: US 250 / SR 33 in Richmond

Location
- Country: United States
- State: Virginia
- Counties: Rockingham, City of Harrisonburg, Greene, Orange, Louisa, Hanover, Henrico, City of Richmond

Highway system
- United States Numbered Highway System; List; Special; Divided; Virginia Routes; Interstate; US; Primary; Secondary; Byways; History; HOT lanes
← SR 32	→ SR 33

U.S. Route 33 (US 33) is a part of the U.S. Highway System that runs from Elkhart, Indiana to Richmond, Virginia. In Virginia, the U.S. Highway runs 135.60 miles (218.23 km) from the West Virginia state line near Rawley Springs east to its eastern terminus at SR 33 in Richmond. US 33 is the primary east–west highway of Rockingham County, which lies in the Shenandoah Valley. The highway connects the independent city of Harrisonburg (which also serves as the seat of Rockingham County), the town of Elkton, and an entrance to Shenandoah National Park. East of the Blue Ridge Mountains, US 33 connects the Piedmont communities of Stanardsville, Gordonsville, and Louisa. The U.S. Highway is a major suburban and urban route in the Richmond metropolitan area. Within Richmond, US 33 runs concurrently with US 250. SR 33 continues from US 33's eastern terminus as a state-numbered extension of the U.S. Highway that connects Richmond with Virginia's Middle Peninsula.

== Route description ==
=== Allegheny Mountains ===
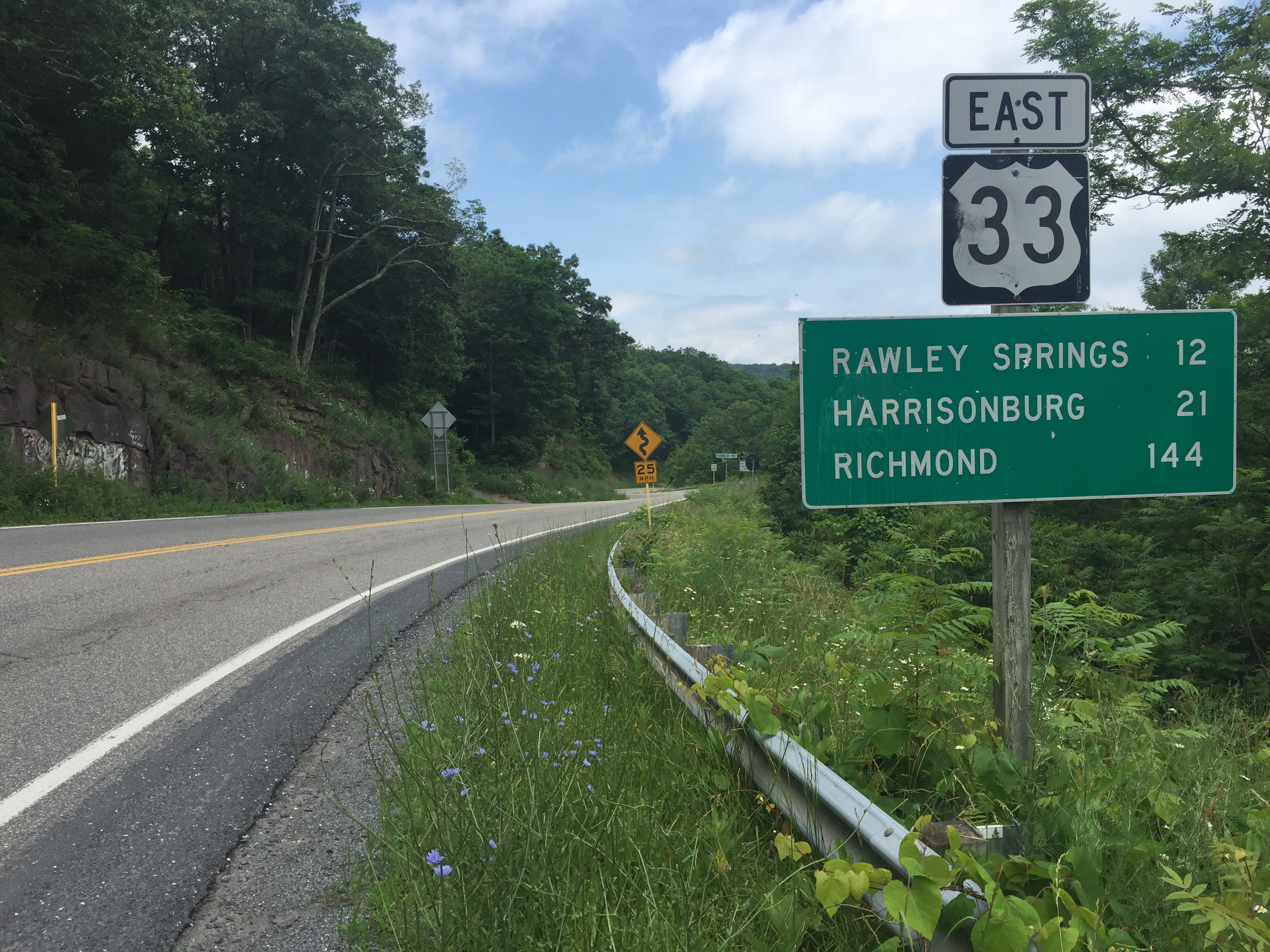
View east along US 33 just after entering Virginia from West Virginia in Rockingham County

US 33 enters Virginia at about 3,450 feet (1,050 m) elevation at Dry River Gap on top of Shenandoah Mountain at the West Virginia state line, having climbed steeply from the community of Brandywine, West Virginia, in the valley of the South Fork of the South Branch of the Potomac River. US 33 then heads east as Rawley Pike, with a curvaceous descent to the narrow but flat valley of the Dry River, which the highway follows east through the George Washington National Forest. East of Rawley Springs, the highway veers away from the river, leaves the national forest, and passes through a low, wide gap in Great North Mountain to enter the Shenandoah Valley.

=== Shenandoah Valley ===
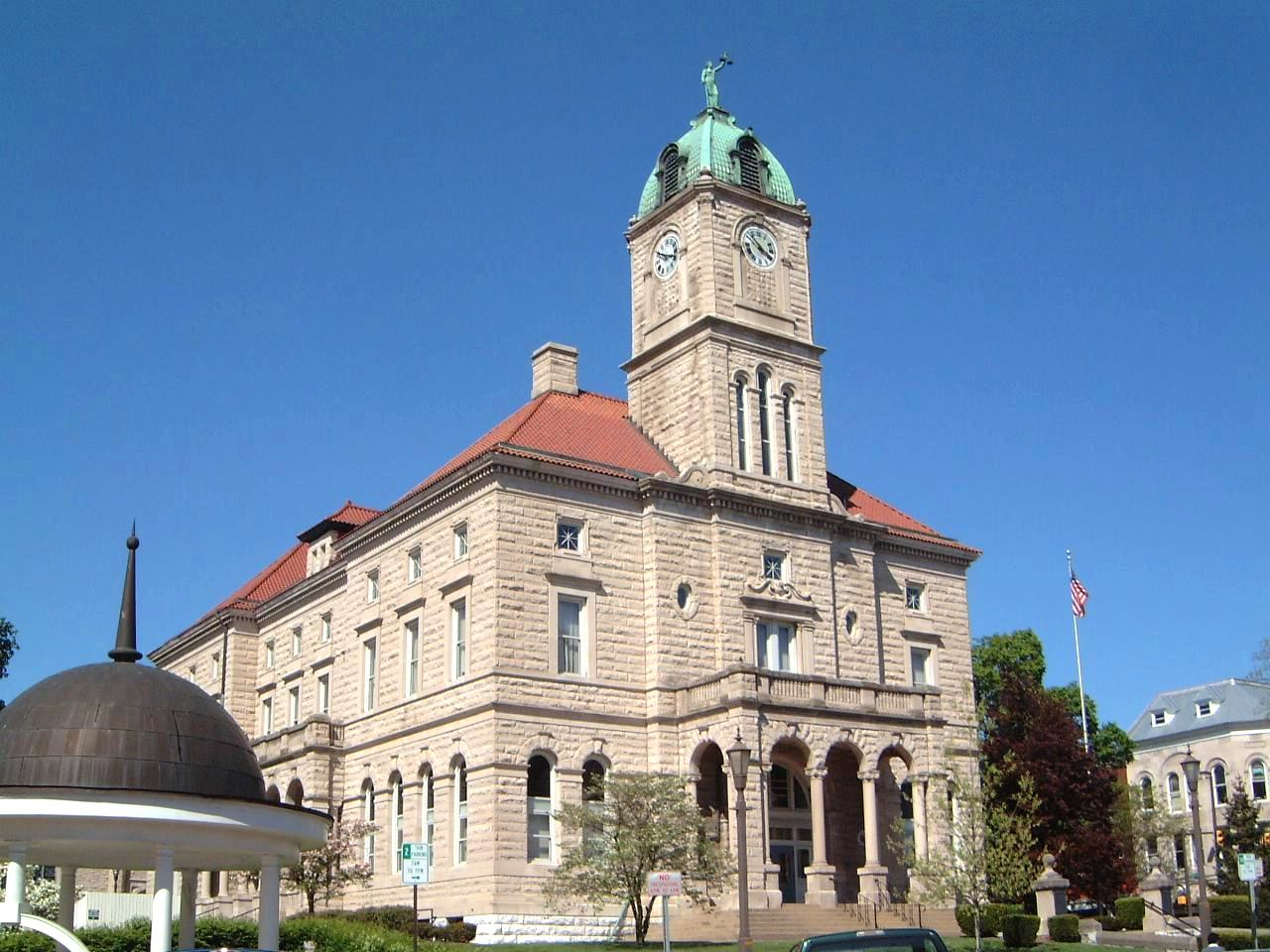
The Rockingham County Courthouse in Harrisonburg, Virginia, at the intersection of US 11 and US 33

Once in the Shenandoah Valley, US 33 passes through the hamlets of Hinton and Dale Enterprise, then passes to the north of Mole Hill before entering the independent city of Harrisonburg.

US 33 continues into Harrisonburg as Market Street, a four-lane divided highway. The road becomes an undivided highway and then reduces to two lanes at its intersection with SR 42 (High Street) in downtown Harrisonburg, after which the highway intersects a branch of the Norfolk Southern Railway's Roanoke District at grade. US 33 meets the southbound direction of US 11 (Liberty Street), then splits to pass along a two-lane, one-way street surrounding Court Square, the site of the Rockingham County courthouse. The eastern side of the square, Main Street, is followed by northbound US 11. Both directions of US 33 therefore have short but separate concurrencies with each direction of US 11 around the Courthouse, before US 33 exits the downtown Harrisonburg area as Market Street.

US 33 expands to four lanes at Mason Street, then curves south and becomes a divided highway at Vine Street. The highway passes over the Norfolk Southern Railway's Roanoke District rail line, then intersects with I-81. After I-81, US 33 expands to six lanes, passing through a commercial area that includes the Harrisonburg Crossing shopping center and the Valley Mall. Eastward, the route returns to a four-lane highway, and is named Spotswood Trail at the city limits of Harrisonburg. US 33 meets the northern end of SR 276 (Cross Keys Road) in Penn Laird as the highway makes a broad curve around the southern end of Massanutten Mountain, within which is the Massanutten Resort. The highway crosses the Norfolk Southern rail line again and passes through McGaheysville, at the base of Massanutten Mountain, continuing to Elkton at the southern edge of the Page Valley.

West of Elkton, US 33 Business (Old Spotswood Trail) splits to the north. US 33 then crosses the South Fork of the Shenandoah River, enters the town limits, and crosses over the Norfolk Southern rail line for the last time. The highway leaves the town at US 340 (East Side Highway) and the east end of US 33 Business. The route then follows West Swift Run southeast to the hamlet of Swift Run, after which it reduces to two lanes and begins a curvaceous ascent of the Blue Ridge, cresting the mountain at Swift Run Gap at an elevation of 2,365 feet (721 m), where the highway crosses the Appalachian Trail and has an intersection with the access road to the Skyline Drive, the north–south highway through Shenandoah National Park, then descending to the Virginia Piedmont.

=== Piedmont ===
After cresting the Blue Ridge, US 33 enters Greene County and has a more gentle descent of the eastern side of the mountain, where the highway follows Swift Run to the hamlet of Lydia, then passes around the north side of Powell Mountain and meets the stream again west of Stanardsville, where the road expands to a four-lane divided highway. US 33 Business (Spotswood Trail) splits to the north to pass through the center of Stanardsville, the county seat of Greene County, while US 33 follows the Stanardsville Bypass. US 33 Business provides access to SR 230, which heads toward Madison. US 33 continues southeast through Quinque and intersects US 29 (Seminole Trail) in Ruckersville.

East of US 29, US 33 reduces to two lanes and enters Orange County. The highway has a short concurrency with SR 20 (Constitution Highway) through Barboursville, where both highways pass under the Norfolk Southern Railway's Washington District rail line. US 33 passes through a gap in the Southwest Mountains before reaching Gordonsville. At the town limit, the U.S. Highway has an intersection with SR 231 (Blue Ridge Turnpike). US 33 and SR 231 run together a short distance east to the Gordonsville Roundabout, where SR 231 heads southwest as Gordon Avenue toward Cismont and US 33 becomes concurrent with US 15 (James Madison Highway) along Main Street. The two highways pass the Exchange Hotel at their underpass of the Washington Subdivision, the Charlottesville–Orange rail line owned by the Buckingham Branch Railroad. At the southern edge of downtown Gordonsville, US 33 and US 15 leave Main Street and veer onto Martinsburg Avenue, which follows CSX's Piedmont Subdivision to the southern limit of Gordonsville, where the highways enter Louisa County.

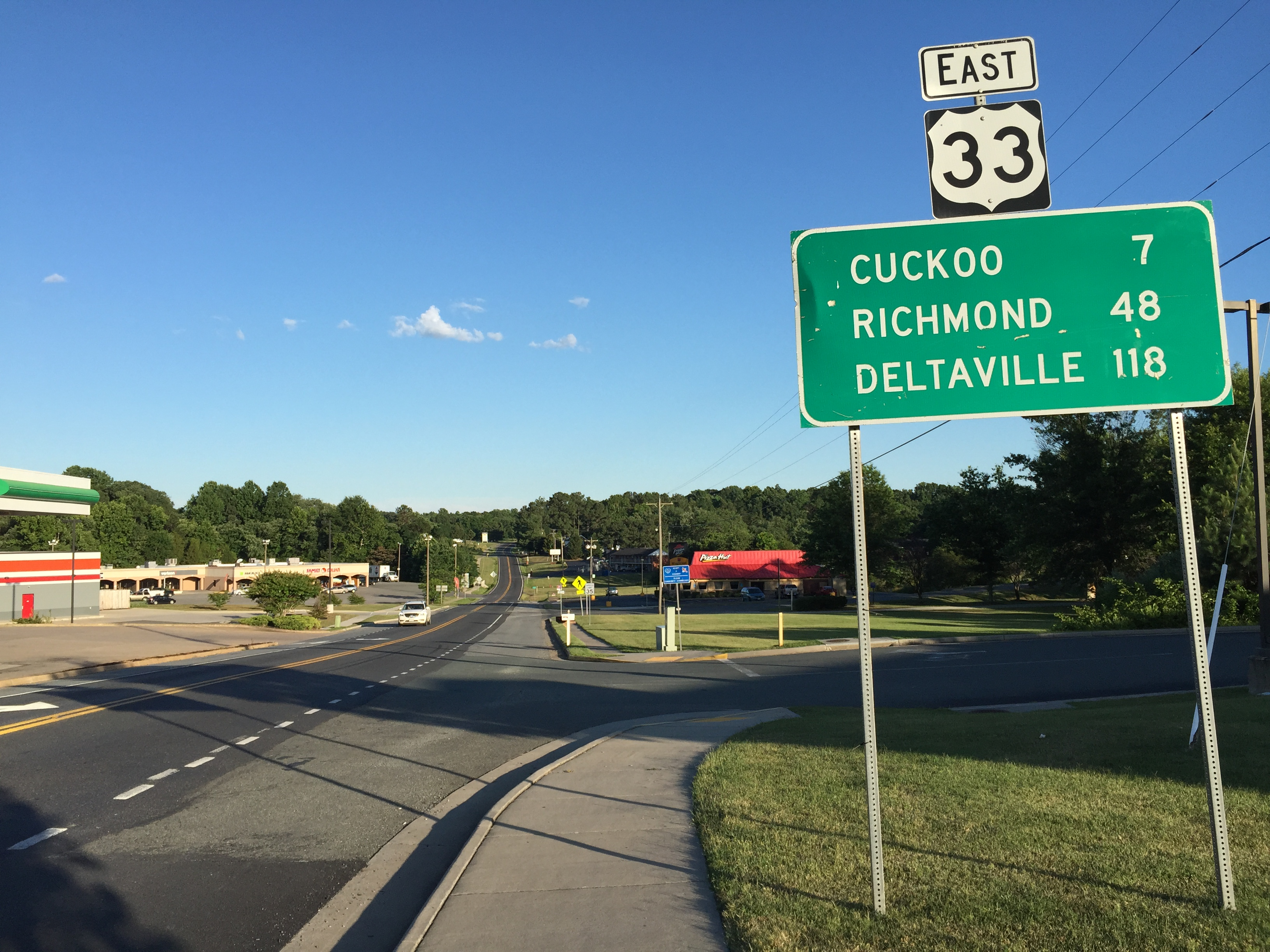
US 33 eastbound at SR 22 and SR 208 in Louisa

US 15 continues south as the James Madison Highway toward Farmville, while US 33 continues paralleling the railroad along Spotswood Trail. At Trevilians, US 33 becomes concurrent with SR 22 (Louisa Road). US 33 and SR 22 head into the town of Louisa as Main Street. On the east side of this county seat, the highways intersect SR 208 (Courthouse Road). SR 208 joins the two highways for a short distance until the state highways diverge from US 33, following the railroad east along Davis Highway toward Mineral, near the epicenter of the 2011 Virginia earthquake, with US 33 continuing southeast along Jefferson Highway. The route passes south of Northeast Creek Reservoir before a short concurrency with US 522 in Cuckoo, where US 522 heads north as Pendleton Road toward Mineral and south as Cross County Highway toward Goochland. Continuing eastward, US 33 then approaches the Richmond Metropolitan Area.

=== Richmond metropolitan area ===
Continuing eastward across the Piedmont, US 33 heads southeast into Hanover County, where the highway is named Mountain Road. The route then passes through the village of Montpelier, after which it meets the western end of SR 54 (Patrick Henry Road). US 33 crosses the South Anna River at Ground Squirrel Bridge northwest of Farrington, then expands to a four-lane divided highway just north of the Chickahominy River, where the highway enters Henrico County and becomes Staples Mill Road. It then intersects I-295, then meets the northern end of SR 157 (Springfield Road) in the Richmond suburb of Glen Allen.

In the community of Laurel, US 33 expands to six lanes at its intersection with Parham Road north of the Richmond Staples Mill Road Amtrak station. In Dumbarton, US 33 meets the western end of SR 356 (Hilliard Road) and has a partial cloverleaf interchange with I-64 with a flyover ramp from westbound I-64 to eastbound US 33.

US 33 enters Richmond, an independent city, just before the highway meets US 250 (Broad Street) near The Shops at Willow Lawn. US 33 and US 250 continue together southeast along this six-lane boulevard toward downtown Richmond. Broad Street also carries the GRTC Pulse bus rapid transit line. The two highways parallel the city line to SR 197 (Malvern Avenue), then pass over I-195 with no direct access. US 33 and US 250 intersect SR 161 (Arthur Ashe Boulevard) northwest of the Science Museum of Virginia, in the former Broad Street railroad station. US 33 and US 250 split just east of the Siegel Center, home of the Virginia Commonwealth University Rams basketball teams, with US 250 continuing on Broad Street, while US 33 turns north onto Hancock Street. The federally numbered highway reaches its eastern terminus at Leigh Street, where it becomes Virginia SR 33. SR 33 then heads east as a state-numbered extension of US 33 through the eastern part of Richmond and West Point to the Middle Peninsula on Virginia's Coastal Plain, reaching the Chesapeake Bay at Stingray Point just east of Deltaville.

== Major intersections ==
County	Location	mi	km	Destinations	Notes
Rockingham		0.00	0.00	US 33 west – Franklin	West Virginia state line (Shenandoah Mountain)
Rockingham				SR 613 (Whitmore Shop Road / Clover Hill Road) – Ottobine	
City of Harrisonburg		21.88	35.21	SR 42 (High Street) to I-81	
City of Harrisonburg		21.96	35.34	US 11 south (Liberty Street)	
City of Harrisonburg		22.06	35.50	US 11 north (Main Street)	Court Square (traffic circle around Rockingham County Courthouse)
City of Harrisonburg		23.65	38.06	I-81 – Winchester, Staunton	Exit 247 (I-81)
Rockingham	Peales Crossroads	27.06	43.55	SR 276 south (Cross Keys Road) / SR 620 north (Indian Trail Road) – Keezletown, Weyers Cave, Airport	Northern terminus of SR 276
Rockingham	Elkton	37.81	60.85	US 33 Bus. east (Old Spotswood Trail) – Elkton	Western terminus of US 33 Bus.
Rockingham	Elkton	39.43	63.46	US 340 / US 33 Bus. west – Waynesboro, Front Royal, Elkton Business District	interchange; eastern terminus of US 33 Bus.
Rockingham	Swift Run Gap	45.68	73.51	Skyline Drive – Shenandoah National Park	Interchange
Greene				SR 810 (Dyke Road) – Dyke, Crozet	former SR 230 south
Greene		53.06	85.39	US 33 Bus. east (Spotswood Trail) to SR 230 – Stanardsville	Western terminus of US 33 Bus.
Greene				SR 622 (Celt Road)	former SR 243
Greene		55.15	88.76	US 33 Bus. west / SR 623 (Swift Run Road / Spotswood Trail) to SR 230 – Stanardsville	Eastern terminus of US 33 Bus.
Greene				SR 609 (Fredericksburg Road)	former SR 243 east
Greene	Ruckersville	59.89	96.38	US 29 (Seminole Trail) – Culpeper, Charlottesville	
Orange	Barboursville	66.64	107.25	SR 20 north (Constitution Highway) – Orange, James Madison's Montpelier	Western end of SR 20 concurrency
Orange	Barboursville	66.86	107.60	SR 20 south (Constitution Highway) – Charlottesville, Barboursville Ruins	Eastern end of SR 20 concurrency
Orange	Gordonsville	72.31	116.37	SR 231 north (Blue Ridge Turnpike) – Madison, James Madison's Montpelier	Western end of SR 231 concurrency
Orange	Gordonsville	72.46	116.61	US 15 north / SR 231 south (Gordon Avenue / truck route) – Orange, Cismont	Gordonsville Circle (traffic circle); eastern end of SR 231 concurrency, western end of US 15 concurrency
Orange	Gordonsville			SR 1006 (South High Street / truck route)	
Louisa		74.03	119.14	US 15 south (James Madison Highway) – Farmville	Eastern end of US 15 concurrency
Louisa	Trevilians	82.31	132.47	SR 22 west (Louisa Road) – Shadwell	Western end of SR 22 concurrency
Louisa	Louisa			SR 669 (Ellisville Drive)	former SR 27 north
Louisa	Louisa	87.23	140.38	SR 208 west (Courthouse Road) to I-64 – Ferncliff	Western end of SR 208 concurrency; former SR 27 south
Louisa	Louisa	87.63	141.03	SR 22 east / SR 208 east (Davis Highway) – Mineral, Spotsylvania, Airport	Eastern end of SR 22 / SR 208 concurrency
Louisa		94.19	151.58	US 522 north (Pendleton Road) – Mineral	Western end of US 522 concurrency
Louisa	Cuckoo	94.85	152.65	US 522 south (Cross County Road) – Gum Spring, Goochland	Eastern end of US 522 concurrency
Hanover	Lone Oak	112.74	181.44	SR 54 east (West Patrick Henry Road) – Ashland	Western terminus of SR 54
Hanover	Farrington			SR 623 (Ashland Road) – Rockville, Ashland	
Henrico		124.54	200.43	I-295 to I-64 / I-95 – Washington, Norfolk, Charlottesville	Exit 49 (I-295)
Henrico		125.15	201.41	SR 157 south (Springfield Road)	Northern terminus of SR 157
Henrico	Greendale	129.85	208.97	SR 356 east (Hilliard Road) / Glenside Drive	Western terminus of SR 356
Henrico		130.86	210.60	I-64 to I-95 – Richmond, Charlottesville	Exit 185 (I-64)
City of Richmond		132.21	212.77	US 250 west (West Broad Street)	Western end of US 250 concurrency
City of Richmond		133.00	214.04	SR 197 (Westwood Avenue / Malvern Avenue) to I-95	
City of Richmond				Hamilton Street to I-195 / I-64 / I-95 / SR 195	
City of Richmond		134.06	215.75	SR 161 (North Boulevard)	
City of Richmond		135.37	217.86	US 250 east (Broad Street) / US 33 Bus. / Hancock Street (SR 33 east)	Eastern terminus; eastern end of US 250 concurrency; no left turn eastbound
1.000 mi = 1.609 km; 1.000 km = 0.621 mi: Concurrency terminus; Incomplete access

== Special routes ==
=== Elkton business route ===
U.S. Route 33 Business
- Location: Elkton
- Length: 1.72 mi (2.77 km)

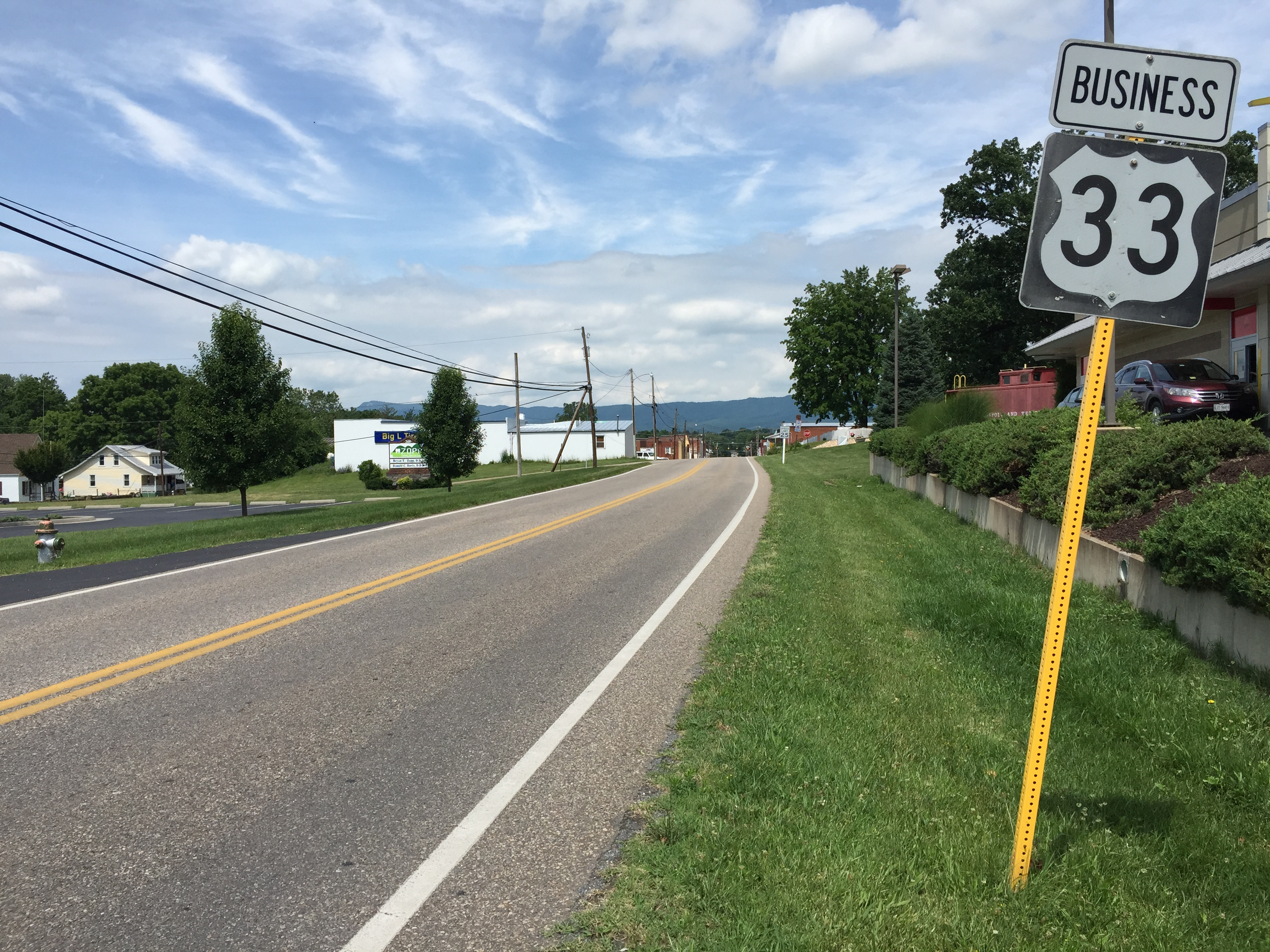
View west along US 33 Bus. in Elkton

U.S. Route 33 Business (US 33 Business) is a business route of US 33 in Rockingham County. The highway runs 1.72 miles (2.77 km) between junctions with US 33 on either side of Elkton. US 33 Business follows Old Spotswood Trail to the western town limit of Elkton, then passes through downtown Elkton as Spottswood Avenue. At Stuart Avenue, which carries US 340, US 33 Business turns south and joins the U.S. Highway for a short distance to the business route's eastern terminus at a partial cloverleaf interchange with US 33.

=== Stanardsville business route ===
U.S. Route 33 Business
- Location: Stanardsville
- Length: 2.52 mi (4.06 km)

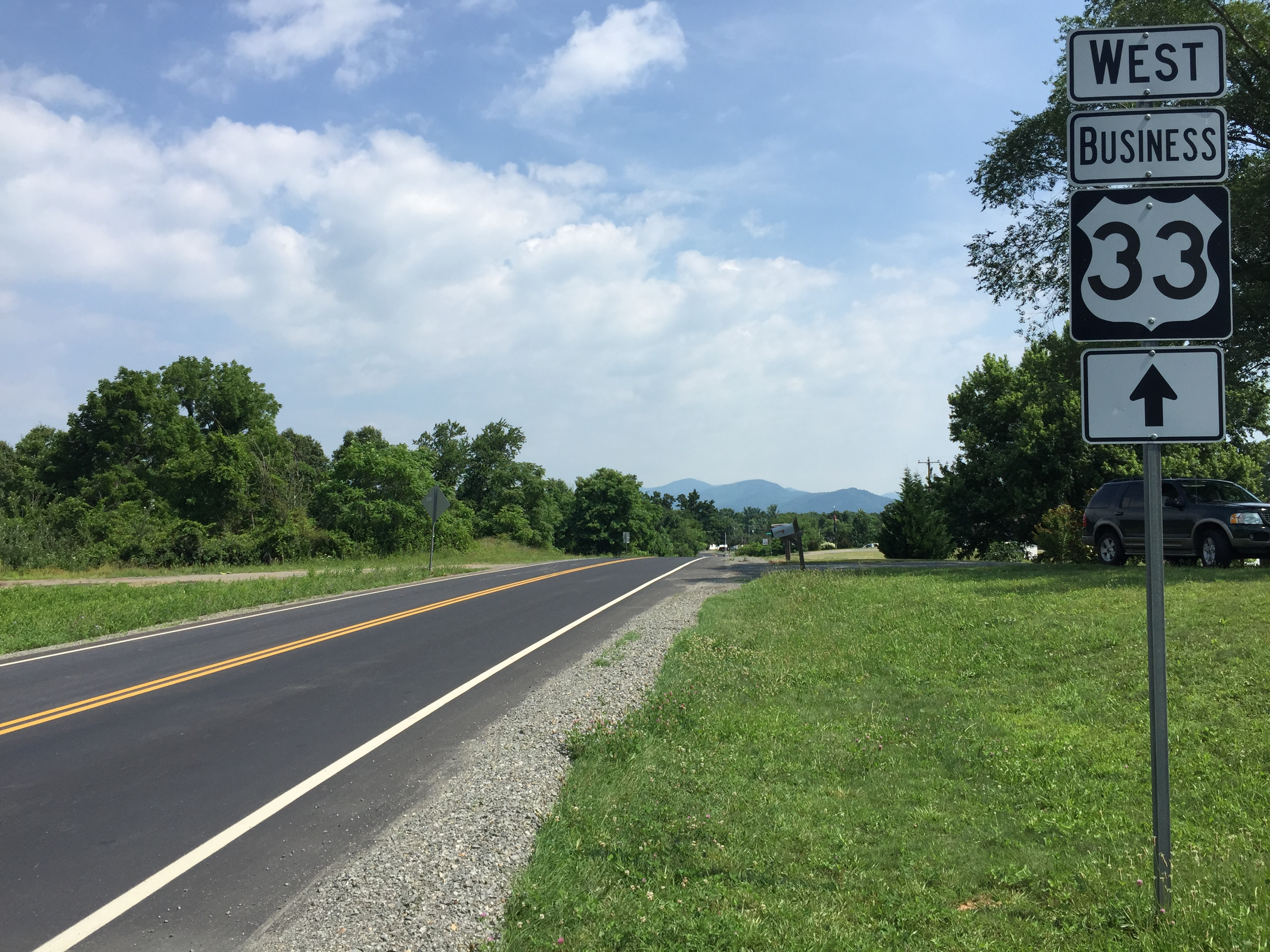
View west from the east end of US 33 Bus. at US 33 near Stanardsville

U.S. Route 33 Business (US 33 Business) is a business route of US 33 in Greene County. The highway runs 2.52 miles (4.06 km) between junctions with US 33 on either side of Stanardsville. US 33 Business follows Spotswood Trail to the western town limit of Stanardsville, then passes through the center of town as Main Street. At the east edge of town, the business route meets the southern end of SR 230 (Madison Road). US 33 Business continues east to reconnect with US 33 at the eastern end of the Stanardsville Bypass.

U.S. Route 33
Previous state: West Virginia	Virginia	Next state: Terminus
