= Virginia State Route 22 =

State highway in central Virginia, US

State Route 22

Route information
- Maintained by VDOT
- Length: 29.81 mi (47.97 km)
- Existed: 1933–present
- Tourist routes: Journey Through Hallowed Ground Byway; Virginia Byway

Major junctions
- West end: US 250 in Shadwell
- SR 231 in Cismont; US 15 at Boswells Tavern; US 33 in Trevilians; SR 208 in Louisa
- East end: US 522 / SR 208 / SR 1112 in Mineral

Location
- Country: United States
- State: Virginia
- Counties: Albemarle, Louisa

Highway system
- Virginia Routes; Interstate; US; Primary; Secondary; Byways; History; HOT lanes
← US 21	→ US 23

State Route 22 (SR 22) is a primary state highway in the U.S. state of Virginia. The state highway runs 29.81 miles (47.97 km) from U.S. Route 250 in Shadwell east to US 522 and SR 208 in Mineral. SR 22 is one of two primary east–west highways in Louisa County, connecting the county seat of Louisa with Charlottesville and Mineral. The state highway runs concurrently with US 33 through Louisa and with SR 208 between Louisa and Mineral.

== Route description ==
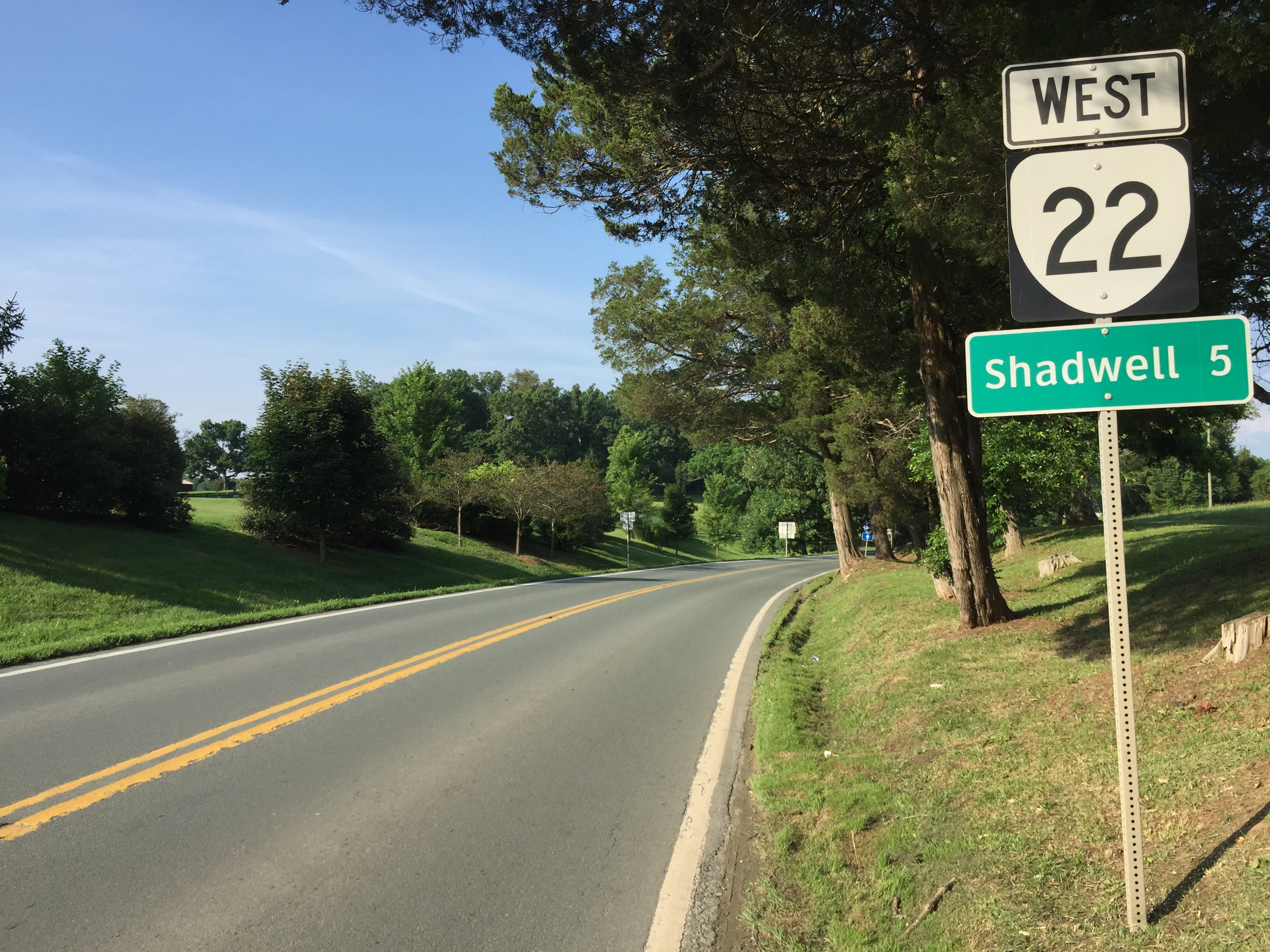
View west along SR 22 at SR 231 in Cismont

SR 22 begins at a tangent intersection with US 250 (Richmond Road) in the community of Shadwell in eastern Albemarle County. The state highway heads northeast as Louisa Road, a two-lane undivided road that parallels CSX's Piedmont Subdivision and passes under Interstate 64. The state highway and railroad diverge in the hamlet of Keswick. SR 22 meets the southern end of SR 231 (Gordonsville Road) in Cismont and crosses over the Piedmont Subdivision rail line in Cobham before entering Louisa County. The state highway intersects US 15 in the hamlet of Boswells Tavern, also known as Waldrop, and crosses the upper reaches of the South Anna River.

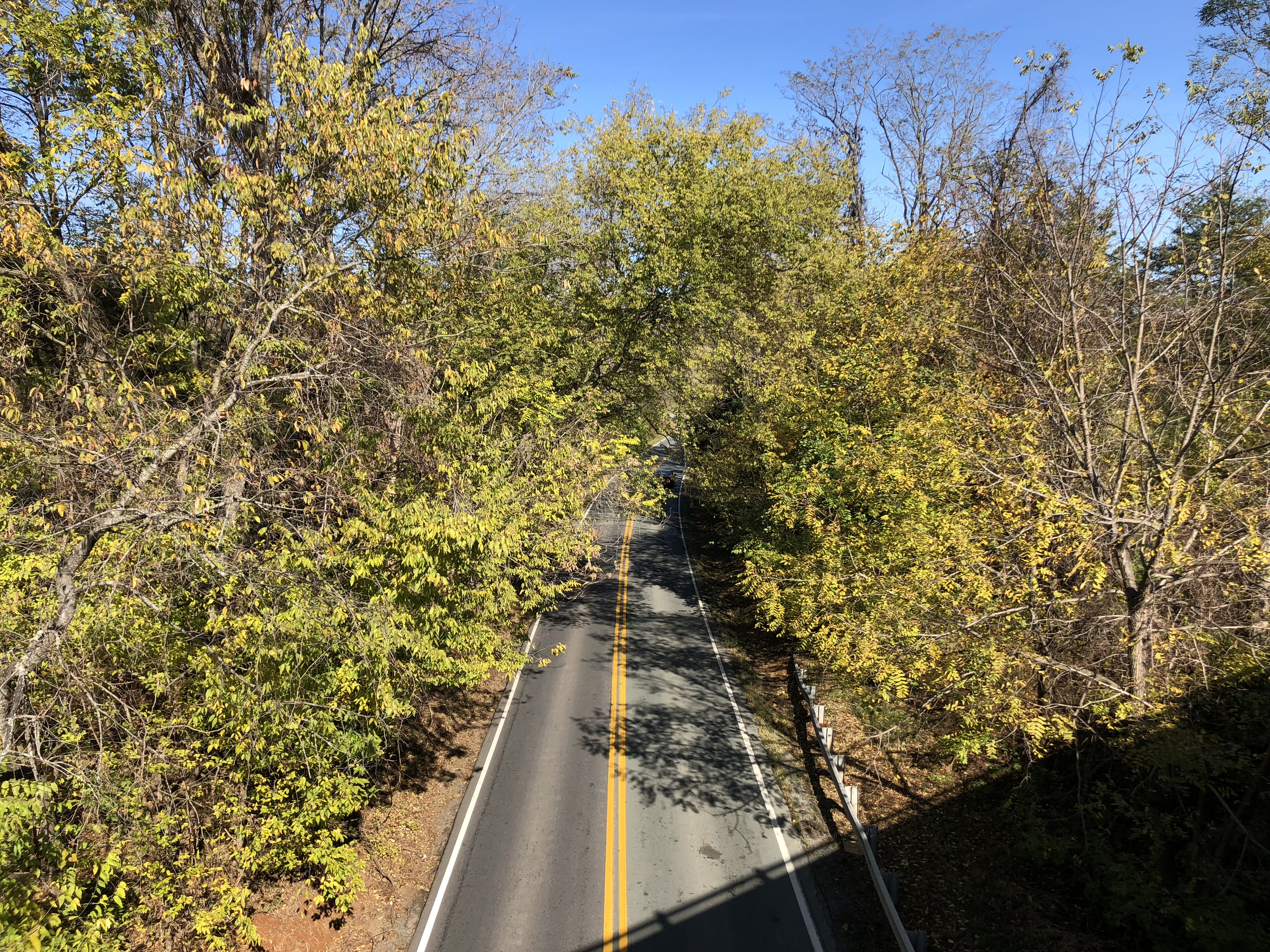
SR 22 eastbound viewed from I-64 in Shadwell

SR 22 begins to run concurrently with US 33 (Spotswood Trail) at Trevilians, where the state highway begins to parallel the railroad again. The two highways enter the town of Louisa as Main Street. At the east end of the downtown area, SR 22 and US 33 intersect SR 208 (Courthouse Road), which joins the two other highways east a short distance to where US 33 diverges as Jefferson Highway. SR 22 and SR 208 continue east parallel to the railroad along Davis Highway, which passes to the north of Louisa County Airport. East of Louisa County High School, the two highways turn south into the town of Mineral, where the two highways follow Piedmont Avenue. SR 22 reaches its eastern terminus at the highways' intersection with US 522. US 522 heads south as Mineral Avenue through downtown Mineral. The northbound direction of the U.S. Highway and SR 208 turn east onto 1st Street, cross the railroad tracks at grade, then turn north on Louisa Avenue to exit the town.

== Major intersections ==
County	Location	mi	km	Destinations	Notes
Albemarle	Shadwell	0.00	0.00	US 250 (Richmond Road) – Zion Cross-Roads, Charlottesville, Staunton	Western terminus
Albemarle	Cismont	5.35	8.61	SR 231 north (Gordonsville Road) – Gordonsville, Madison	Southern terminus of SR 231
Louisa	Boswells Tavern	13.05	21.00	US 15 (James Madison Highway) – Gordonsville, Farmville	
Louisa	Trevilians	19.28	31.03	US 33 west (South Spotswood Trail) – Gordonsville, Harrisonburg	West end of concurrency with US 33
Louisa	Louisa			SR 669 (Ellisville Drive)	former SR 27 north
Louisa	Louisa	24.20	38.95	SR 208 west (Courthouse Road) to I-64 – Ferncliff	West end of concurrency with SR 208; former SR 27 south
Louisa	Louisa	24.60	39.59	US 33 east (Jefferson Highway) – Richmond	East end of concurrency with US 33
Louisa	Mineral	29.81	47.97	US 522 / SR 208 east / SR 1112 (Mineral Avenue / First Street) to SR 618 – Cuckoo, Spotsylvania, Culpeper, Bumpass	Eastern terminus; east end of concurrency with SR 208
1.000 mi = 1.609 km; 1.000 km = 0.621 mi: Concurrency terminus
