= VA22 =

VA-22 has the following meanings:

- Attack Squadron 22 (U.S. Navy)
- Virginia's 22nd congressional district
- State Route 22 (Virginia)
