= LKU =

LKU or lku may refer to:

- LKU, the FAA LID code for Louisa County Airport, Virginia, United States
- LKU, the Indian Railways station code for Lalkuan Junction railway station, Uttarakhand, India
- lku, the ISO 639-3 code for Kungkari language, an extinct Australian language
