= Grassdale =

Grassdale may refer to:

== Australia ==
- Grassdale, Queensland, a locality in the Toowoomba Region

== United States ==
- John Coleman House, also known as Grassdale, an NRHP property in Eutaw, Alabama
- Grassdale (Trevilians, Virginia), an NRHP property in Louisa County, Virginia
