= Brokenburg, Virginia =

Unincorporated community in Virginia, US

Coordinates: 38°08′44″N 77°43′08″W

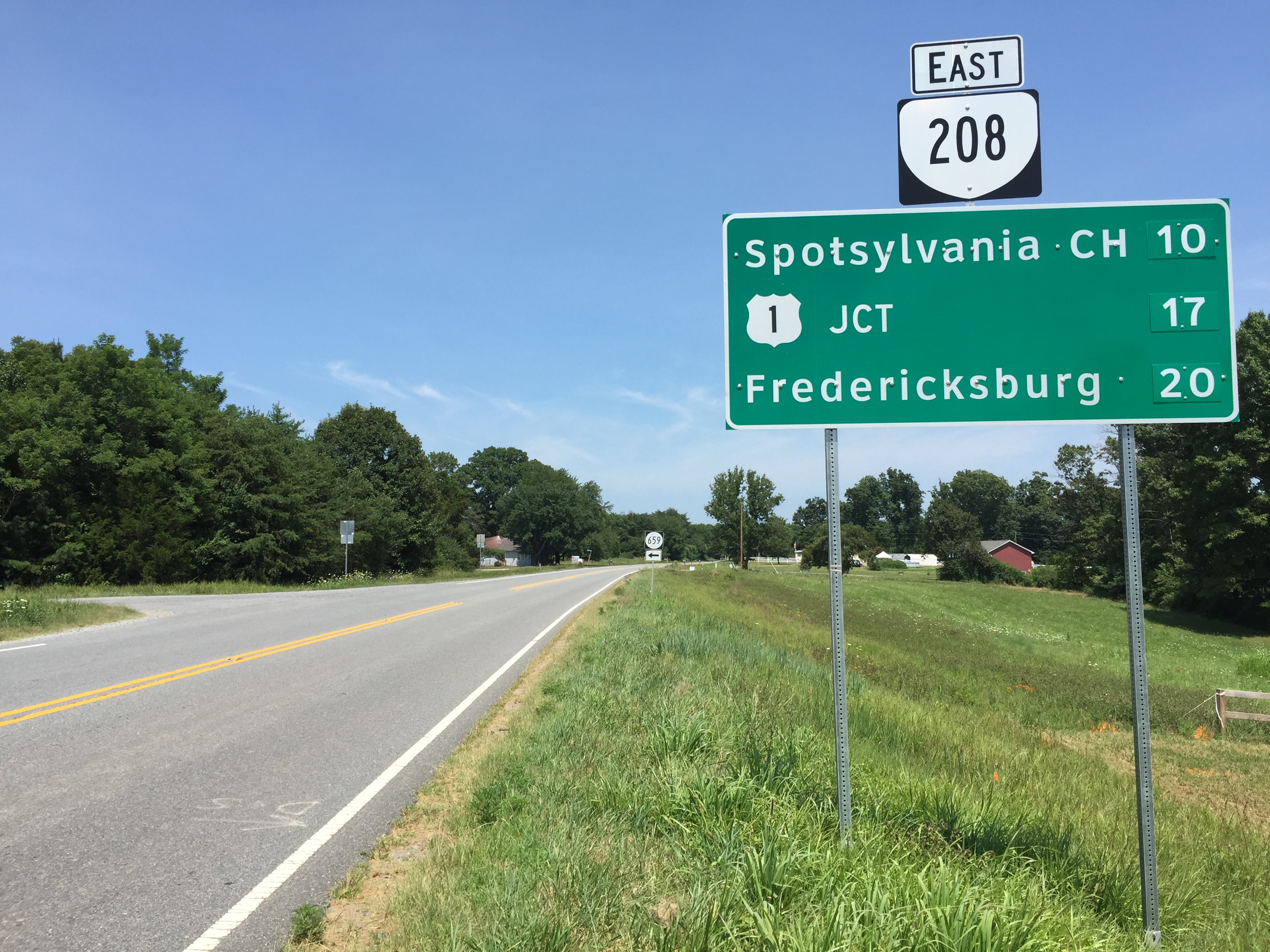
View east along Virginia State Route 208 (Courthouse Road) at Lanes Corner Road in Brokenburg

Brokenburg is an unincorporated community in Spotsylvania County, in the U.S. state of Virginia.
