= Green Springs National Historic Landmark District =

Historic site in Virginia, US

- Green Springs Historic District
- U.S. National Register of Historic Places
- U.S. National Historic Landmark District
- Virginia Landmarks Register
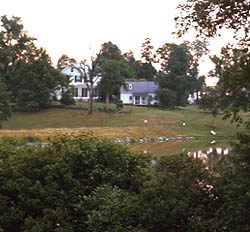
- "Bracketts," located in the Green Springs District

- Location within Virginia
- Location: Louisa County, Virginia, USA
- Nearest city: Zion Crossroads, Virginia
- Coordinates: 38°1′23″N 78°9′55″W
- Area: 14,004 acres (5,667 ha); 5,766.04 federal easements 56.67 km^{2}
- Architect: Multiple
- Architectural style: Greek Revival, Italianate, Federal
- NRHP reference No.: 73002036
- VLR No.: 054-0111

Significant dates
- Added to NRHP: March 07, 1973
- Designated VLR: February 20, 1973

Green Springs National Historic Landmark District is a national historic district in Louisa County, Virginia noted for its concentration of fine rural manor houses and related buildings in an intact agricultural landscape. Admitted to the National Register of Historic Places in 1974, it became the first rural National Landmark Historic district. Named for one of the historic manor houses (itself named for a spring known to Thomas Jefferson who grew up and lived in Albemarle County nearby), the district comprises 14,000 acres (5,700 ha) of fertile land, contrasting with the more typical poor soil and scrub pinelands surrounding it.

== Description ==
The district is located 1.5 miles (2 km) north of Interstate 64 from exit No. 136, "Zion Crossroads." The district is roughly bounded by U.S. Route 15 and Virginia Routes 22 and 613. The area is named for a natural spring noted by Thomas Jefferson as possessing "some medicinal virtue." The district features a mixture of wooded and farmed lands. About 600 million years ago, when most of what became the eastern United States (including Virginia) was covered by a shallow sea, volcanic activity left a basin-like topographic feature which contains the only mineral deposit of consequence in the area, vermiculite. That volcanic feature led to a heavy clay soil that retains plant nutrients and moisture, creating an open landscape suitable for farming. The area is noted for its park-like views, particularly from U.S. Route 15.

== Preservation ==
The district was preserved following attempts in the early 1970s by then Governor Linwood Holton, a Republican, and the Commonwealth of Virginia's Department of Welfare and Institutions, to build a diagnostic and detention center on 200 acres owned by Richard Purcell, brother of longtime politician turned Circuit Judge Harold Purcell. While early plans suggested that payroll alone at the site would add $2 million annually to the local economy, opponents circulated drawings showing that the cellblocks surrounded by a 30 foot security fence and guarded by a 60-foot control tower would become an environmental eyesore, quite unlike the historic Rotunda at the University of Virginia a half hour's drive away and shown dwarfed in the corner as a scale model. Opponents, who ultimately incorporated as Historic Green Springs Inc., noted the district had many historic homes which represented nearly a century and a half of architectural development, as well as vistas showing land "enhanced rather than despoiled" by human presence. They ultimately used litigation citing the National Historic Preservation Act of 1966 and the National Environmental Policy Act of 1970, together with favorable reports from the Virginia Historic Landmarks Commission and the National Trust for Historic Preservation, and an unfavorable report from the National Clearinghouse for Criminal Justice Planning and Architecture at the University of Illinois.

Initially, Governor Holton planned to use revenue-sharing funds promoted by fellow Republicans in the Nixon Administration, specifically newly available federal block grants distributed through the Law Enforcement Assistance Administration, as authorized under the Safe Streets Act. However, after an unfavorable legal decision by the 4th Circuit Court of Appeals written by Judge Simon E. Sobeloff, which overruled Judge Merhige's pro-development ruling, Holton changed plans. Now Virginia would forego the million dollar grant and self-fund the center's construction, despite cost estimates having doubled in the interim.

Initially, only one building in Green Springs, Boswell's Tavern (built circa 1735 and four miles from the proposed prison site) had been listed on the National Register for Historic Places, but by the end of 1970, two more historic properties were federally listed, and by July 1973 there were 34 listed properties. When in October 1972 Governor Holton suggested obtaining sufficient conservation easements (permitted by the Virginia Open-Space Land Act of 1966) by next March could change his mind about constructing the prison at Green Springs, more than 7000 acres were placed under easement by that spring, compared to less than a thousand acres in Virginia as a whole since the act's inception. In February 1973, the VHLC recommended designating Green Springs a historic district, despite its rural location and more than 10,000 acre scope, and forwarded its recommendation to both Governor Holton and to the federal keeper of the National Register of Historic Places. Nonetheless, on March 30, 1973, Governor Holton announced the prison construction would proceed, since nearly half of the land in the district (especially the 1000 acres now owned by Richard Purcell and other parcels held by owners who hoped for vermiculite royalties discussed below) was not subject to the checkerboard of conservation easements. By fall, Republican Secretary of the Interior Rogers C.B. Morton (a Kentucky-born former Maryland congressman and chairman of the Republican National Committee) wrote the term-limited Governor Holton criticizing the proposed prison's location. The Richmond Mercury published a cartoon entitled "Holton's Vietnam" (showing the governor opening his shirt LBJ-style to display an outline of Louisa County with the prison location starred), echoing a Washington Post editorial.

In December 1972, W.R. Grace & Co. proposed to strip mine vermiculite from the area for fire-proofing insulation and cat litter, among other uses. Although a combination of negative publicity and legal liability for other toxic mining techniques would propel Grace into bankruptcy in 2001, it ultimately did not construct the vermiculite mine in Louisa County, instead holding that clay mix as reserves until ultimately deeding the parcel to Historic Green Springs in 1993, as the Secretary of Interior had suggested in 1976.

The vermiculite strip mine was constructed, albeit on a smaller scale, in 1979 by Virginia Vermiculite Inc., a company founded a few years earlier by Air Force veteran and former EPA official Robert Sansom, who had become a development advocate in central Virginia. In 1977, Sansom filed a lawsuit challenging Historic Green Springs's listing, and U.S. District Judge Robert Merhige invalidated the district's landmark status in August 1980, but new President Jimmy Carter signed an amendment to the National Landmarks Act on December 12, 1980 which in effect invalidated the ruling, so the district's historic status was soon restored. Google Earth maps of the area clearly show the destruction caused by the mine. Following the Grace donation to Historic Green Springs in 1993, Virginia Vermiculite filed a lawsuit alleging that was an antitrust violation, although others considered the litigation a SLAPP. U.S. District Judge James H. Michael Jr. dismissed the lawsuit in 1995, and ultimately in 2000 issued a summary judgment against Virginia Vermiculite, which the 4th Circuit Court of Appeals upheld (that appellate court having reversed the earlier dismissal, but the U.S. Supreme Court denied certiorari in 2003). Asbestos was also found in the Louisa vermiculite/clay mix, as residents had feared.

Many significant houses and lands continue to be preserved and excluded from the development that is transforming areas around the historic district, especially near the Zion Crossroads exit from I-64, which had little water on site, although less than 3 miles from Green Spring, although the James River was about 23 miles away in Fluvanna County. In 2001, developer Charles D. Kincannon purchased the 140 acre Green Spring site formerly planned for the prison, although development there had been limited to no more than 3 dwellings because of septic issues. Neighbors soon realized three large wells were being drilled, with the water to be pumped to Zion Crossroads to support a 1200 unit housing development and golf course. A drought the following summer which affected several farms at Green Springs led to litigation to limit changes in the water table which would restrict traditional farming uses in the historic district led to monitoring. However, the James River Water Authority was also created, and developers then planned to pump water from state land at Point of Fork (at the confluence of the James River and Rivanna River) to support further commercial development at Zion Crossroads, including a Walmart distribution center. However, such pumping required approval of the U.S. Army Corps of Engineers. Archaeological explorations by 1980 had confirmed that Point of Fork (the site of an arsenal in the Revolutionary War and War of 1812) had earlier been Rassawek (the historic main village of the Monacan Nation, which Captain John Smith had noticed in 1612), and thus warned against using the site for the pumping station. However, Colonial Pipeline proceeded with site work, and in 2016 its bulldozers unearthed artifacts and human remains, more than a year before notifying the Monacans (who with three other Virginia tribes finally achieved federal recognition in 2018). The Army Corps required consultation with Preservation Virginia as well as the Monacans and the state historic preservation board. In 2020, Rassawek was listed among the 11 most endangered historic sites in Virginia, and ultimately, the pumping station was constructed at another site.

== National Register properties ==
Significant places listed individually on the National Register of Historic Places include:

- Boswell's Tavern, an important meeting place during the American Revolution and a well-preserved example of a Colonial-era tavern.
- Grassdale, an Italianate villa built in 1861 by the Morris family, later home of Rear Admiral David W. Taylor and his wife Imogene Morris Taylor.
- Green Springs, a late 18th-century house built by the Morris family near the springs that lent their name to the district.
- Hawkwood, an Italianate villa designed by prominent New York architect Alexander Jackson Davis for Richard Overton Morris, completed in 1855, gutted by fire in 1982.
- Ionia, a late 18th-century 1 1/2-story frame house, original seat of the Watson family
- Westend, a temple-fronted plantation house with extant dependencies, built by the Morris family.

== Major historic properties ==
Major historic properties in the district include:

- Barton House is an early 19th-century 1 1/2-story frame house built by the Barton family.
- Belle Monte is a Federal style two-story house built in the early 18th** century and enlarged in both the 19th and 20th century. (**The Historic American Buildings Survey listed the house built in the 19th century but pulled that data from a National Historic Register Nomination Form filled out in error) There are multiple historic references to the original builder of the house and family being born at the residence prior to the 1790s as well as land transfers predating the 1780s and a reference to Belle Monte in a letter from Thomas Jefferson. Lafayette stayed at and used the house as a recuperative hospital for his soldiers. There is definite precedence that places the original structure in the early to mid-1700s. Belle Monte is in close proximity to Boswell's Tavern and built in the same era.
- Berea Baptist Church is an 1857 Gothic Revival church established in 1795.
- Bracketts is a two-story frame house built about 1800.
- Corduroy is a circa 1850 two-story frame house with a hipped roof and a single-story entrance portico.
- Eastern View is a two-story frame house with a hipped roof and Moorish-style porches, built in 1856.
- Galway is a two-story frame house with a hipped roof and a balustraded Tuscan porch. Its eaves feature a scalloped cornice.
- Kenmuir is a 2 1/2-story frame house built about 1855. The house shows Gothic Revival influence with its lancet windows in the gables.
- Oakleigh is a two-story late 19th century frame house with a bracketed cornice and a full-width veranda on the front featuring sawn detailing.
- Prospect Hill is an 18th-century house that was progressively enlarged in the 19th and 20th centuries. The two-story frame house features a two-level porch on two sides, along with dependent structures.
- Quaker Hill is a small one-story frame house dating to circa 1820.
- St. John's Chapel surrounded by a historic graveyard, is located at the intersection of Route 640 (East Jack Jouett Road) and Route 617 (East Green Springs Road) in Louisa County. The chapel was completed in 1888, but today is used for scheduled religious services twice yearly.
- Sylvania was built in 1746 by the Morris family. The two-story frame house has a hipped roof with a cross gable, with wings to either side and an ell to the rear. Sylvania was extensively damaged by a tornado on October 13, 2011, which blew the roof off the house.
- Westlands is an Italianate two-story brick house, built around 1856.

== Other properties ==
Other historic properties include:

- Ashleigh is a 1900 frame house of two stories with a large veranda.
- Aspen Hill is a two-story late-19th century frame house with a lancet gable window.
- Fair Oaks is a two-story frame house built about 1900 with an Ionic Classical Revival veranda.
- Green "K" Acres (Oakleigh) is a late 19th-century two-story frame house with a veranda.
- Hard Bargain is a Stick Style two-story frame house with an irregular plan and a veranda.
- Hill House is a 1918 two-story frame house.
- Midloch is a circa 1900 two-story frame house with paneled chimneys and a large veranda.
- Mill View is a 1 1/2-story frame house dating to the late 18th century, with a two-story addition.
- Peers House is an 1857 two-story frame house with a hipped roof and a cross gable. A second Peers House was built in the late 19th century with sawn ornament on its two-story porch.
- Sunny Banks is an 1888 two-story Queen Anne Victorian frame house featuring foundation to roof front bay windows.
- Sunny View was built about 1900. It is a two-story frame house with a large veranda.

The district also includes the village of Poindexter at the intersection of Virginia Routes 613 and 640.

== Status ==
On May 30, 1974, the district was declared a National Historic Landmark. On December 12, 1977, the United States Secretary of the Interior agreed to accept preservation easements for nearly half of the 14,004 acres (57 km^{2}) in the district. These allow the NPS to own development rights to the land, and to ensure its continuing rural and agricultural nature. The district is an affiliated area of Shenandoah National Park. The National Park Service does not provide any facilities in the district.

== See also ==
- List of National Historic Landmarks in Virginia
- National Register of Historic Places listings in Louisa County, Virginia
