= Boswell's Tavern =

Historic commercial building in Virginia, United States

- U.S. National Register of Historic Places
- Virginia Landmarks Register
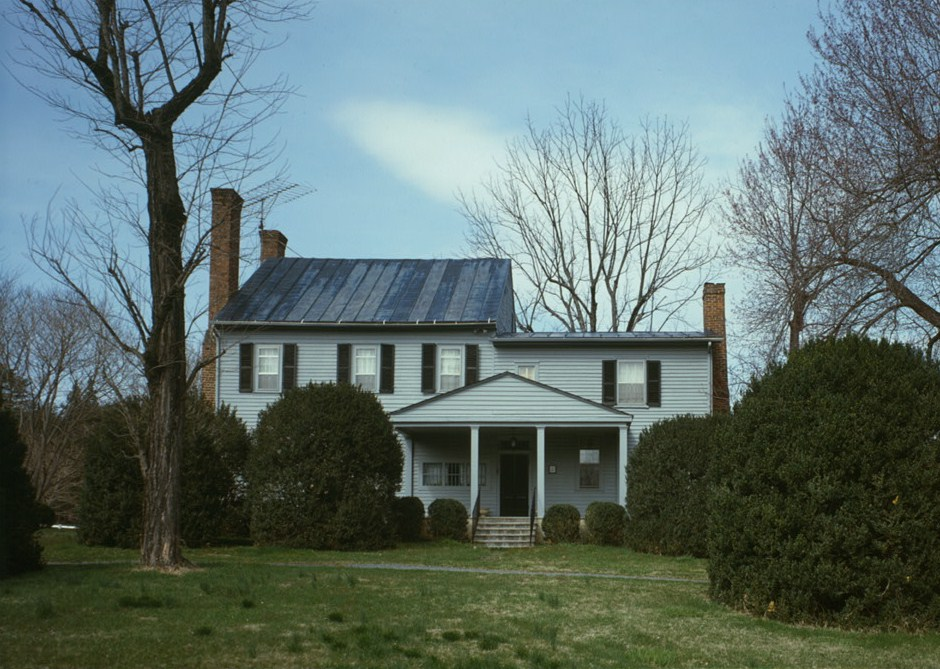
- Boswell's Tavern, HABS Photo, March 1983

- Location within Virginia Location within the United States
- Location: Jct. of VA 22 and U.S. 15, Gordonsville, Virginia
- Coordinates: 38°04′12″N 78°11′01.8″W
- Area: 0 acres (0 ha)
- NRHP reference No.: 69000257
- VLR No.: 054-0007

Significant dates
- Added to NRHP: November 25, 1969
- Designated VLR: November 5, 1968

Boswell's Tavern is an excellent example of a complete 18th century tavern in Virginia. Located near Gordonsville, Virginia, the tavern is located at the intersection of present-day U.S. Route 15 and Virginia State Route 22, the centerpiece of a village named after the tavern. The tavern was built in the mid-18th century, probably by Colonel John Boswell. The tavern was the site of a 1781 encampment by American forces during the American Revolutionary War under the Marquis de Lafayette. The tavern was a frequent meeting place for notable Virginia figures, including Thomas Jefferson, James Madison and Patrick Henry. A few colonial troops were captured at the tavern in March 1781 by British colonel Banastre Tarleton in an attempt to capture Jefferson and to disrupt meetings of the Virginia legislature.

The tavern is a two-story three-bay frame building with prominent chimneys at the west end. The innkeeper's wing, originally 1-1/2 stories, has been increased in height to two stories. A small gabled porch is a modern addition, as is a one-story addition to the innkeeper's quarters. The public section consists of two main rooms, a warming room, a bar and a stair hall. Portions of the original bar remain. The innkeeper's wing consists of a single large room on the main level with a sleeping area above.

Boswell's Tavern was placed on the National Register of Historic Places on November 25, 1969. It is included in the Green Springs National Historic Landmark District, encompassing the surrounding countryside and a number of important houses from the 18th and 19th centuries.

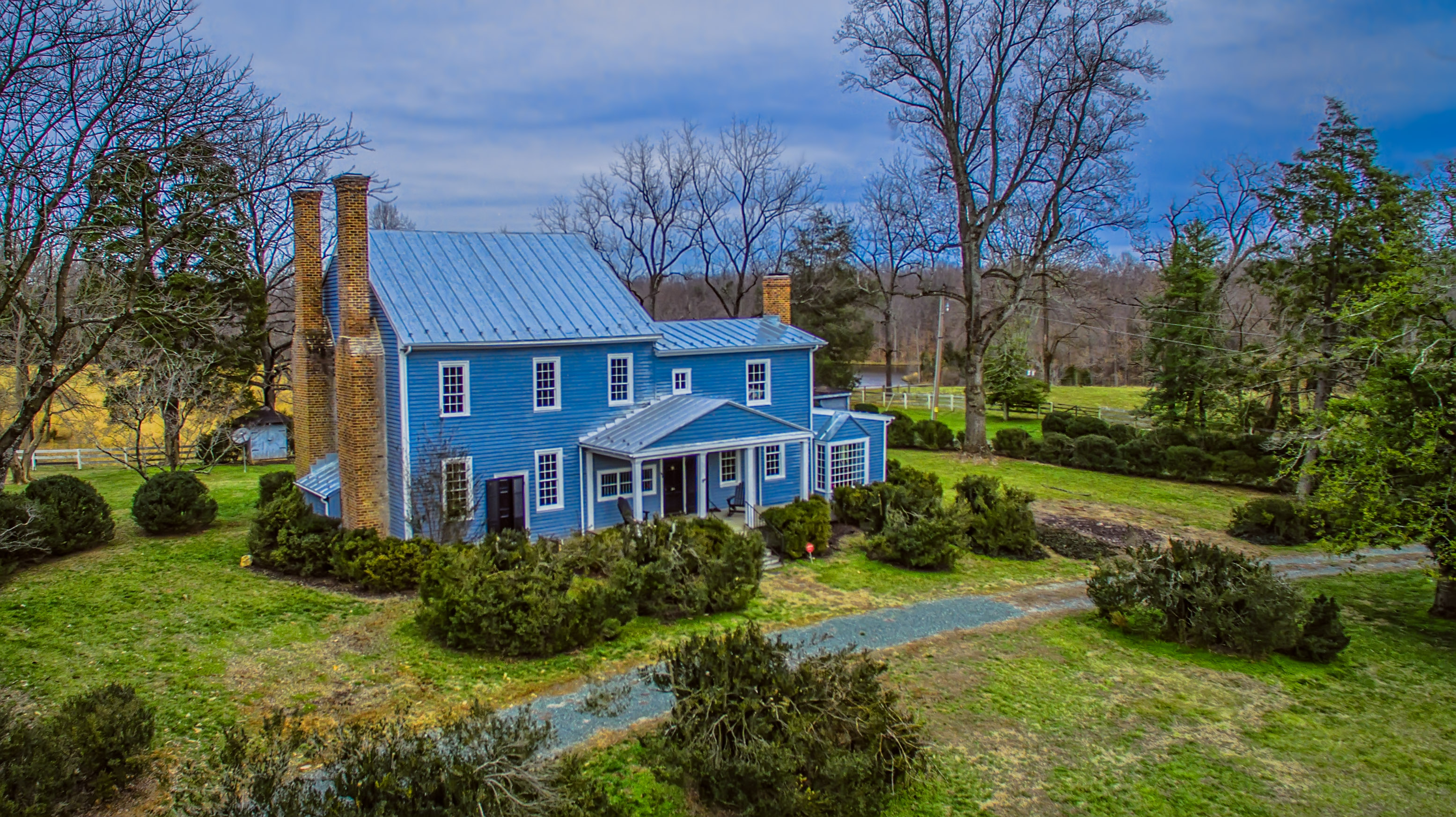
Aerial image of Boswell's Tavern
