= Hawkwood (Gordonsville, Virginia) =

Historic house in Virginia, United States

- U.S. National Register of Historic Places
- Virginia Landmarks Register
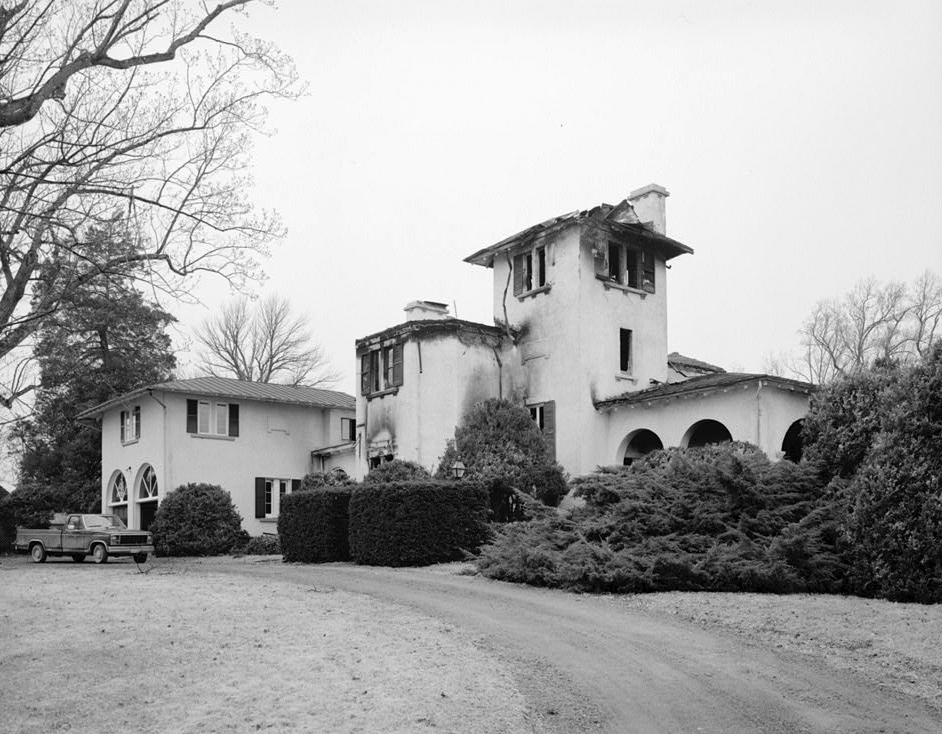
- Hawkwood after the 1982 fire, HABS photo, 1985

- Location within Virginia Location within the United States
- Location: S of Gordonsville off U.S. 15, near Gordonsville, Virginia
- Coordinates: 38°00′56.67″N 78°11′41.67″W
- Area: 404 acres (163 ha)
- Built: 1854
- Architect: Davis, Alexander J.
- Architectural style: Italian Villa
- NRHP reference No.: 70000809
- VLR No.: 054-0036

Significant dates
- Added to NRHP: September 17, 1970
- Designated VLR: September 1, 1970

Hawkwood is an Italianate-villa style country house near Gordonsville, Virginia, United States. It was designed by architect Alexander Jackson Davis of New York in 1851 for Richard Overton Morris of the locally prominent Morris family, and was completed in 1855. The house, which has also been described as being in the Italian Villa style, is one of only two Davis designs in that style which have not been substantially altered.

The house is constructed of stuccoed brick, dominated by a projecting two-story pavilion with one-story hipped-roof wings on either side. The south wing has an arcade on three sides, and features a picturesque three-story tower capped by a hipped roof. The main entry hall is octagonal. Interiors were sparsely detailed. Landscaping is informal, complementing the house and its hilltop site. A nearby overseer's house is complementary, in a wood-frame cottage style.

The house was gutted by fire in 1982, which left the walls and tower standing. It was placed on the National Register of Historic Places on September 17, 1970. It is included in the Green Springs National Historic Landmark District, which encompasses much of the surrounding countryside.
