= Baker–Strickler House =

Historic house in Virginia, United States

- U.S. National Register of Historic Places
- Virginia Landmarks Register
- Location within Virginia Location within the United States
- Location: 10074 W. Gordon Rd., Gordonsville, Virginia
- Coordinates: 38°7′47″N 78°12′15″W
- Area: 1.2 acres (0.49 ha)
- Built: 1856
- Architectural style: Greek Revival
- NRHP reference No.: 09000046
- VLR No.: 054-5034

Significant dates
- Added to NRHP: February 18, 2009
- Designated VLR: December 18, 2008

Baker–Strickler House, also known as May's Place, is a historic home located at Gordonsville, Louisa County, Virginia. It was built about 1856, and is a two-story, three-bay frame I-house dwelling in the Greek Revival style. It features decorative corner pilasters, a peaked door and window lintels, and a two-layer exterior frieze on all four elevations.

It was listed on the National Register of Historic Places in 2009.
