= Post Oak, Virginia =

- Unincorporated community
- Location within Northern Virginia Location within Virginia Location within the United States
- Coordinates: 38°09′58″N 77°39′48″W
- Country: United States
- State: Virginia
- County: Spotsylvania
- Time zone: UTC−5 (Eastern (EST))
  - Summer (DST): UTC−4 (EDT)

Post Oak is an unincorporated community in Spotsylvania County in the U.S. state of Virginia. Post Oak is located near the intersection of Courthouse Road and Post Oak Road. Post Oak Middle School and Spotsylvania High School are less than one-half mile away. A farm is next to Post Oak. Today, there is a supermarket located about two miles from Post Oak. Located on Post Oak Rd. Within the Post Oak community is Calvary Baptist Church.

== See also ==
- Spotsylvania County
- Virginia
