= Ionia (Trevilians, Virginia) =

Historic house in Virginia, United States

- U.S. National Register of Historic Places
- Virginia Landmarks Register
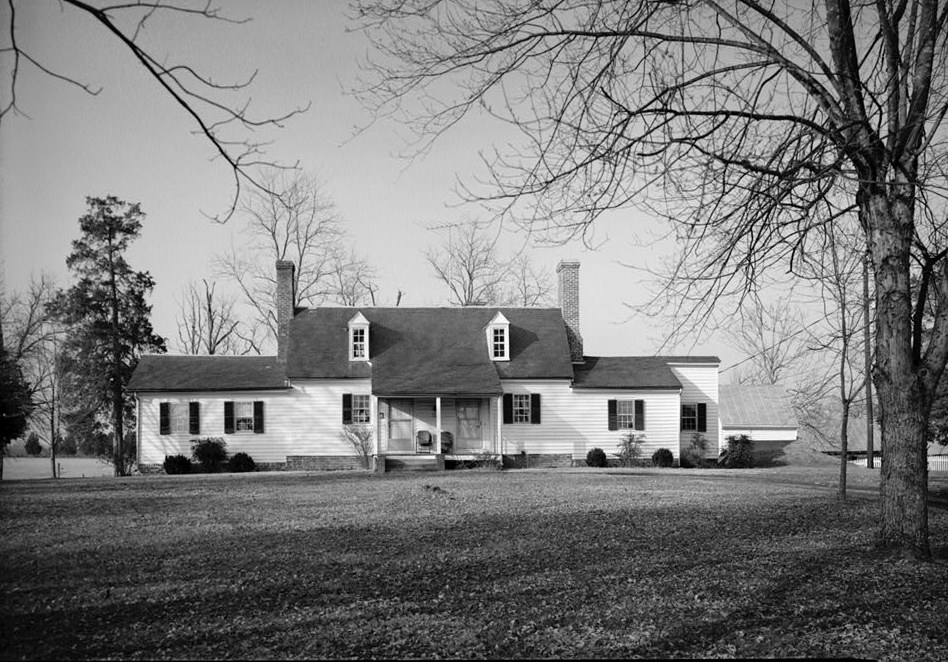
- Ionia, HABS Photo, May 1984

- Location within Virginia Location within the United States
- Location: 0.1 mi. E of VA 640 and 0.8 mi. N of jct. with VA 613, near Trevilians, Virginia
- Coordinates: 38°02′16.51″N 78°10′07.98″W
- Area: 640 acres (260 ha)
- NRHP reference No.: 72001405
- VLR No.: 054-0043

Significant dates
- Added to NRHP: June 30, 1972
- Designated VLR: May 16, 1972

Ionia is a frame house near Trevilians, Virginia, that was the centerpiece of a large plantation in the late 18th and early 19th centuries. Built around 1775, Ionia was the home of the Watson family. It was built as Clover Plains by Major James Watson, the son of a Scottish immigrant, in a fertile area of Louisa County, Virginia that is now a National Historic Landmark District, the Green Springs National Historic Landmark District. The plantation was the third largest in Louisa County in the late 18th century, leading to the nickname "Wheat Stacks" for Watson as a result of his prosperity. After Major Watson's death in 1845 the house passed to his son, Dr. George Watson, who renamed the house "Ionia" and, since he lived in Richmond, used it as a summer residence. George Watson died in 1854, leaving Ionia to his widow, who lived there until the 1870s. Following her death in 1879 the property was subdivided. The Watson family went on to build a number of houses in the Green Springs area.

The house is a 1 1/2-story frame structure, covered with wood clapboards. One-story wings flank the main block on either side, with an ell to the rear. The house retains much of its original woodwork. The property includes several dependencies, including a dairy house, smoke house, kitchen, slave quarters and an early barn.

Ionia was placed on the National Register of Historic Places on June 30, 1972.
