= Grassdale (Trevilians, Virginia) =

Historic house in Virginia, United States

- U.S. National Register of Historic Places
- Virginia Landmarks Register
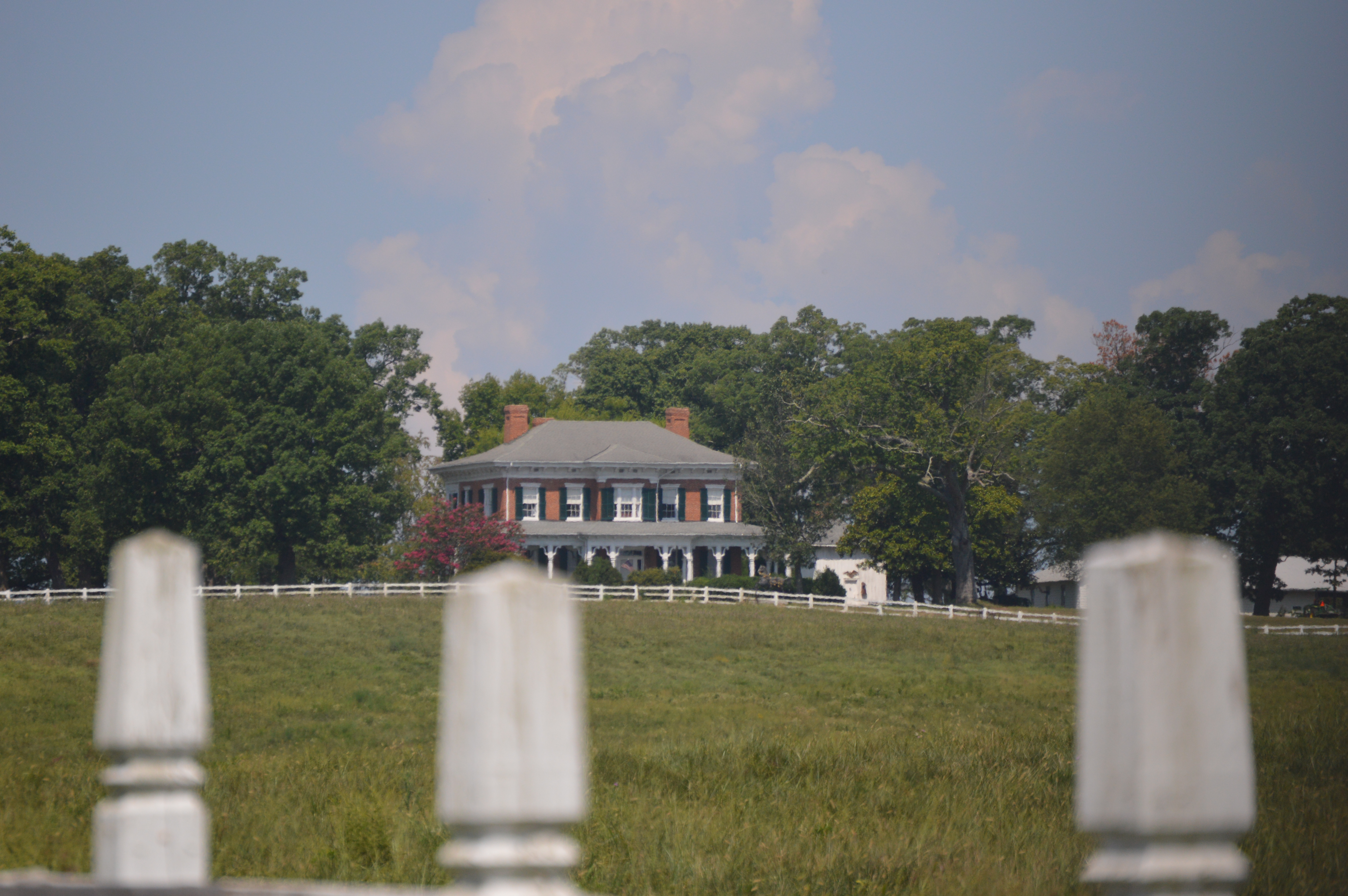
- Distant view from U.S. Route 15

- Location within Virginia Location within the United States
- Location: W of Trevilians off U.S. Route 15, near Trevilians, Virginia
- Coordinates: 38°02′35.62″N 78°11′50.08″W
- Area: 170 acres (69 ha)
- Built: 1861
- Built by: James M. Morris, Jr. Maj. Calvin Crebbs (master carpenter)
- Architectural style: Italian Villa
- NRHP reference No.: 73002035
- VLR No.: 054-0032

Significant dates
- Added to NRHP: July 2, 1973
- Designated VLR: February 20, 1973

Grassdale is an Italianate-style villa in Louisa County, Virginia, notable for its size and style in a stable, rural region. The house was built in 1861 by James Maury Morris, Jr., a member of the prominent Morris family of Louisa County. The tract had originally been assembled by James Morris' grandfather, Colonel Richard Morris, who had established the neighboring Green Springs plantation. The property is part of the Green Springs National Historic Landmark District, established to preserve the notable houses of the area and their surrounding landscapes.

== Description ==
Grassdale is a two-story brick house in a T-shaped plan. A broad veranda surrounds the house on the front (east) side and part of the south side. The exterior features extensive bracketing in scales varied to suit the main house and the porch. The ell takes the form of a projecting pavilion, with its own projecting porch. The interior is laid out around a central hall with a room on either side, a cross hall with a stairway, and a dining room to the rear. The front hall is set apart from the cross hall with pilasters and an entablature. The main rooms have access to the porch through full-length windows that raise into a pocket in the wall above. Outbuildings include a smokehouse and a two-story kitchen.

== History ==
James Maury Morris Jr. inherited the property from his father, Dr. James Maury Morris Sr., in 1844. There had been structures at the site prior to the construction of the 1861 house. James Jr. died in 1872, leaving Grassdale to his widow. Their daughter, Imogene, inherited the house. Her husband was Rear Admiral David Watson Taylor, whose Watson and Taylor family connections were notable apart from his own notability in naval affairs and ship design. Imogene sold the house to the Walton Lumber Company in 1943.

Grassdale was listed on the National Register of Historic Places on July 2, 1973. It is included in the Green Springs National Historic Landmark District, which encompasses much of the surrounding countryside.
