= Westend (Trevilians, Virginia) =

Historic house in Virginia, United States

- U.S. National Register of Historic Places
- Virginia Landmarks Register
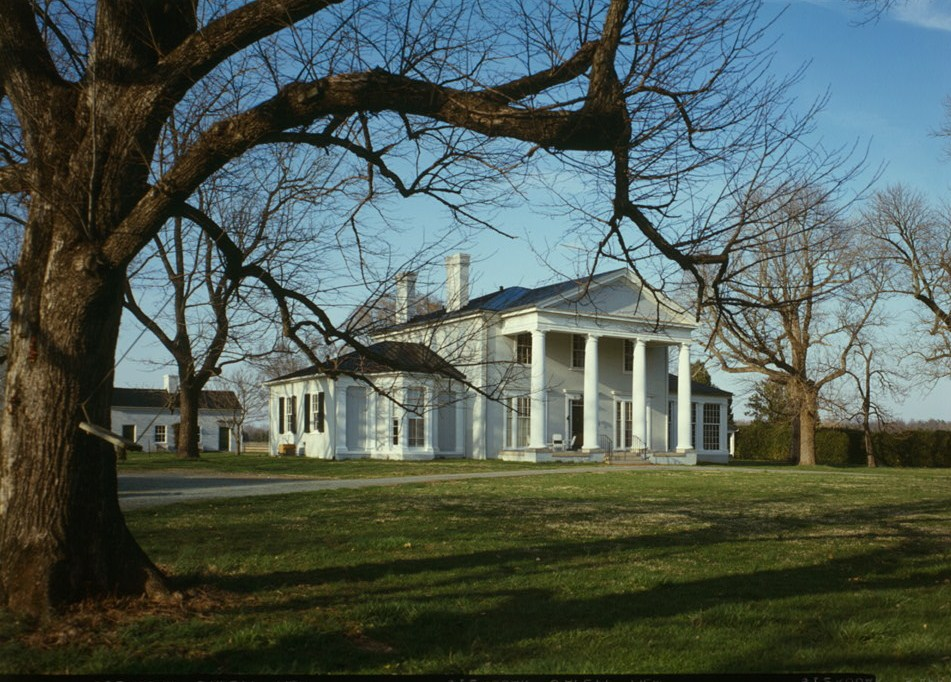
- Westend, HABS Photo, 1983

- Location within Virginia Location within the United States
- Location: S of jct. of VA 22 and SR 638, near Trevilians, Virginia
- Coordinates: 38°02′44.63″N 78°10′14.96″W
- Area: 591 acres (239 ha)
- Built: 1849
- Architect: Col. James Magruder
- Architectural style: Early Republic, Jeffersonian classicism
- NRHP reference No.: 70000810
- VLR No.: 054-0073

Significant dates
- Added to NRHP: September 17, 1970
- Designated VLR: September 1, 1970

Westend is a temple-fronted house near Trevilians, Virginia, United States. Built in 1849, the house's design refers to the Classical Revival style, representing an extension of the Jeffersonian ideal of classical architecture. The house was built for Mrs. Susan Dabney Morris Watson on a property that she had inherited from her late husband. The building project was supervised by Colonel James Magruder. The house was the centerpiece of a substantial plantation, and a number of dependencies, including slave dwellings, survive. Westend remains in the ownership of the descendants of Mrs. Watson.

The two-story house is built of brick, and features a tetrastyle Tuscan portico on its principal facade. The main three-bay section is flanked by three-bay, one-story wings and surmounted by a hipped roof with prominent interior chimneys. The fronts of these wings were originally orangeries. The rear facade features a one-story Tuscan porch. The house is painted in a light color to resemble stucco. The interior is arranged around a central hall that is subdivided into an entrance hall and a stair hall to the rear, with two rooms to either side.

Westend was placed on the National Register of Historic Places on September 17, 1970. It is included in the Green Springs National Historic Landmark District, a notable concentration of large plantations and manor houses centered on the Green Springs neighborhood. Much of the surrounding country is under scenic easement agreements, administered by the National Park Service.
