= Trevilians, Virginia =

Unincorporated community in Virginia, United States

- Unincorporated community
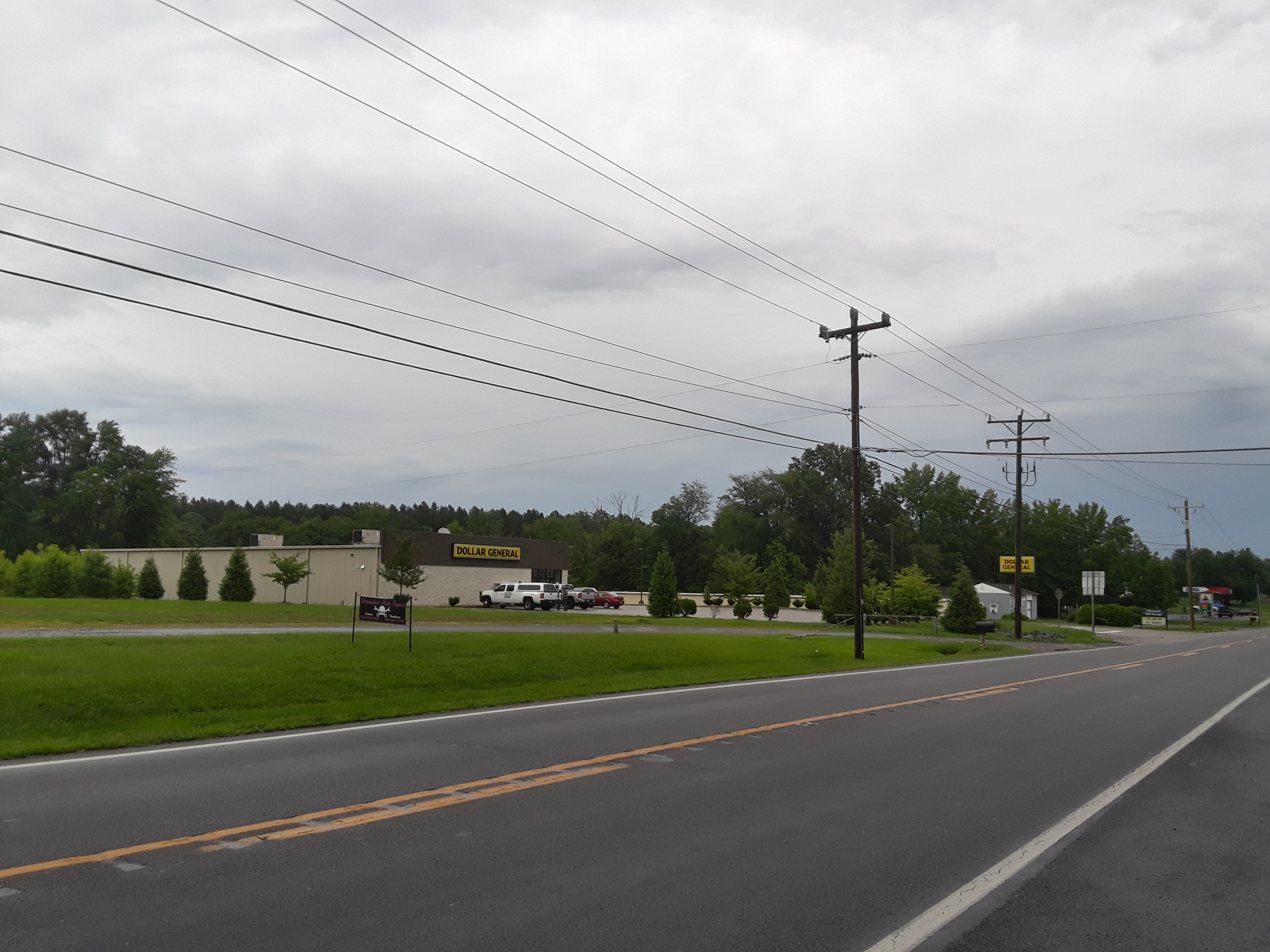
- Central business district of Trevilians, July 2023

- Location within Virginia Location within the United States
- Coordinates: 38°03′05″N 78°04′22″W
- Country: United States
- State: Virginia
- County: Louisa
- Elevation: 522 ft (159 m)
- Time zone: UTC−5 (Eastern (EST))
  - Summer (DST): UTC−4 (EDT)
- ZIP code: 23170
- Area code: 540
- GNIS feature ID: 1496323

Trevilians is an unincorporated community in Louisa County, Virginia, United States. Trevilians is located at the junction of U.S. Route 33 and Virginia State Route 22, 4 miles (6.4 km) west-northwest of Louisa. Trevilians has a post office with ZIP code 23170.

Grassdale, Green Springs, Ionia, and Westend are listed on the National Register of Historic Places.

== Climate ==
The climate in this area is characterized by hot, humid summers and generally mild to cool winters. According to the Köppen Climate Classification system, Trevilians has a humid subtropical climate, abbreviated "Cfa" on climate maps.

== See also ==
- Battle of Trevilian Station
