= Cismont, Virginia =

Unincorporated community in Virginia, United States

Cismont
- Unincorporated community
- Location within the state of Virginia Cismont (the United States)
- Coordinates: 38°03′27″N 78°18′49″W
- Country: United States
- State: Virginia
- County: Albemarle
- Time zone: UTC−5 (Eastern (EST))
  - Summer (DST): UTC−4 (EDT)
- GNIS feature ID: 1495392

Cismont is an unincorporated community in Albemarle County, Virginia, United States.

Castle Hill and Grace Episcopal Church are listed the National Register of Historic Places.

Zion Hill Baptist is a historically Black Church in Cismont. In December 1974, Dr. R. A. Johnson was pastor.

== Notable residents ==
- Ralph Horween (1896–1997), Harvard Crimson All-American and National Football League football player.
