= Zion Crossroads, Virginia =

Unincorporated community in Virginia, United States

Coordinates: 37°58′16″N 78°13′11″W

Zion Crossroads is an unincorporated community in Louisa and Fluvanna counties of Virginia, United States. It is at the intersections of James Madison Highway (U.S. Route 15) and Three Notch Road (U.S. Route 250). Interstate 64 passes one-half mile to the northeast.

== History ==
When the U.S. Highway System was created in 1928, U.S. Route 250 was originally routed from West Virginia to Ohio. In 1934, the route was expanded southward and eastward to Richmond from West Virginia. The name "Zion Crossroads" was probably created from the nearby Zion United Methodist Church when the new U.S. Route 250 crossed U.S. Route 15 in the 1930s.

Zion Cross Roads was a sleepy little intersection of U.S. Route 15 and U.S. Route 250 with a motel, gas station, restaurant, and grocery store until Interstate 64 opened in the early 1970s. The interstate led to further development, and by 2000 developer Charles D. Kincannon proposed to build 1200 homes and a golf course to accompany the gas stations, convenience stores and fast food eateries. The problem was lack of water, although a Kincannon affiliated company bought about 140 acres at Green Springs National Historic Landmark District about 3 miles away and began pumping water to the new development. Louisa County, Virginia made huge improvements to the infrastructure and the area developed in the early 2000s into a major retail and business center to include the Walmart Distribution Center, hotels, restaurants, and the Spring Creek Golf Community development. A major improvement to the traffic flow of the area was made when a Diverging diamond interchange was completed by the Virginia Department of Transportation in 2014.

The Fluvanna County water tower just south of the county line had the 10th best water tower art from a poll by Tnemec in 2020. The art has also become Fluvanna County's new county logo.

== Landmarks ==
About 2 1/2 miles north is Green Springs National Historic Landmark District, a U.S. National Historic Landmark. The Fluvanna County Seat of Palmyra is 8 miles (13 km) to the south.
