= Cuckoo, Virginia =

Unincorporated community in Virginia, United States

- Unincorporated community
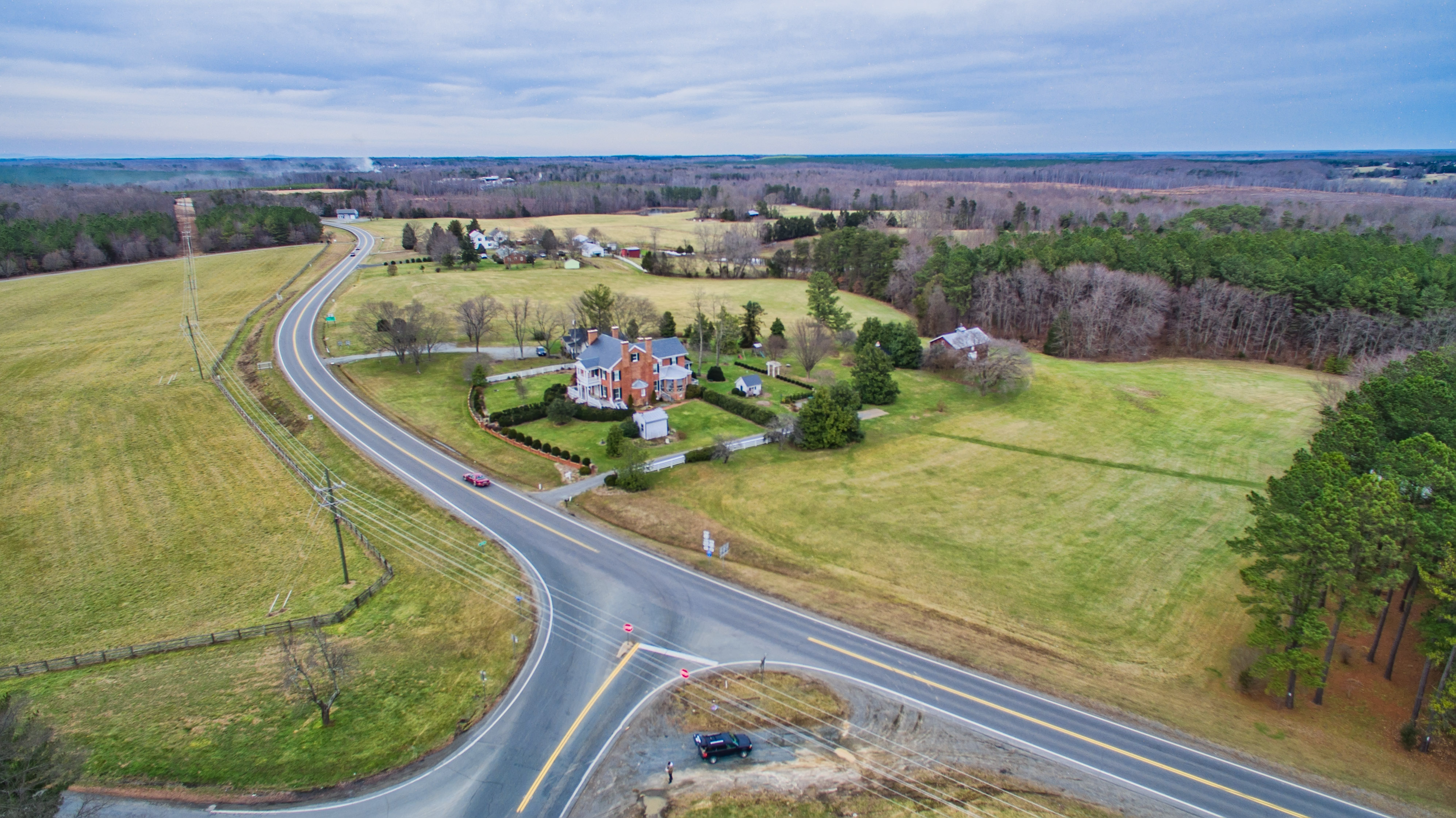
- Aerial view of Cuckoo

- Location within Virginia Location within the United States
- Coordinates: 37°57′8″N 77°54′00″W
- Country: United States
- State: Virginia
- County: Louisa
- Elevation: 423 ft (129 m)
- Time zone: UTC-5 (Eastern (EST))
  - Summer (DST): UTC-4 (EDT)
- ZIP code: 23117
- Area code: 540
- GNIS feature ID: 1496864

Cuckoo is a small unincorporated community in Louisa County, Virginia, United States. It is located about eight miles southeast of Louisa, roughly between Charlottesville and Richmond. The Cuckoo Tavern stood nearby, which in 1781 was the beginning of Jack Jouett's ride to warn the Colonists of the arrival of Banastre Tarleton's British cavalry (similar to Paul Revere's Ride). There was also a large house named Cuckoo built in 1819 for Henry Pendleton on the former property of William Overton Callis. A historical marker is at the spot. Its post office has been closed.

The tavern was named for the cuckoo clock on the wall, supposedly one of the first in Virginia.

Shirley Ann Jackson, American nuclear physicist and President of Rensselaer Polytechnic Institute, has familial ties to Cuckoo.

== Earthquake ==
On Tuesday August 23, 2011, at 1:51 PM ET a magnitude 5.8 earthquake was recorded 2.4 mi (3.9 km) SW of Cuckoo on the western bank of Indian Creek. It was felt from Atlanta, Georgia to Quebec City, Quebec, Canada and as far west as Cincinnati, Ohio.
