= Louisa County Airport =

Louisa County Airport Freeman Field
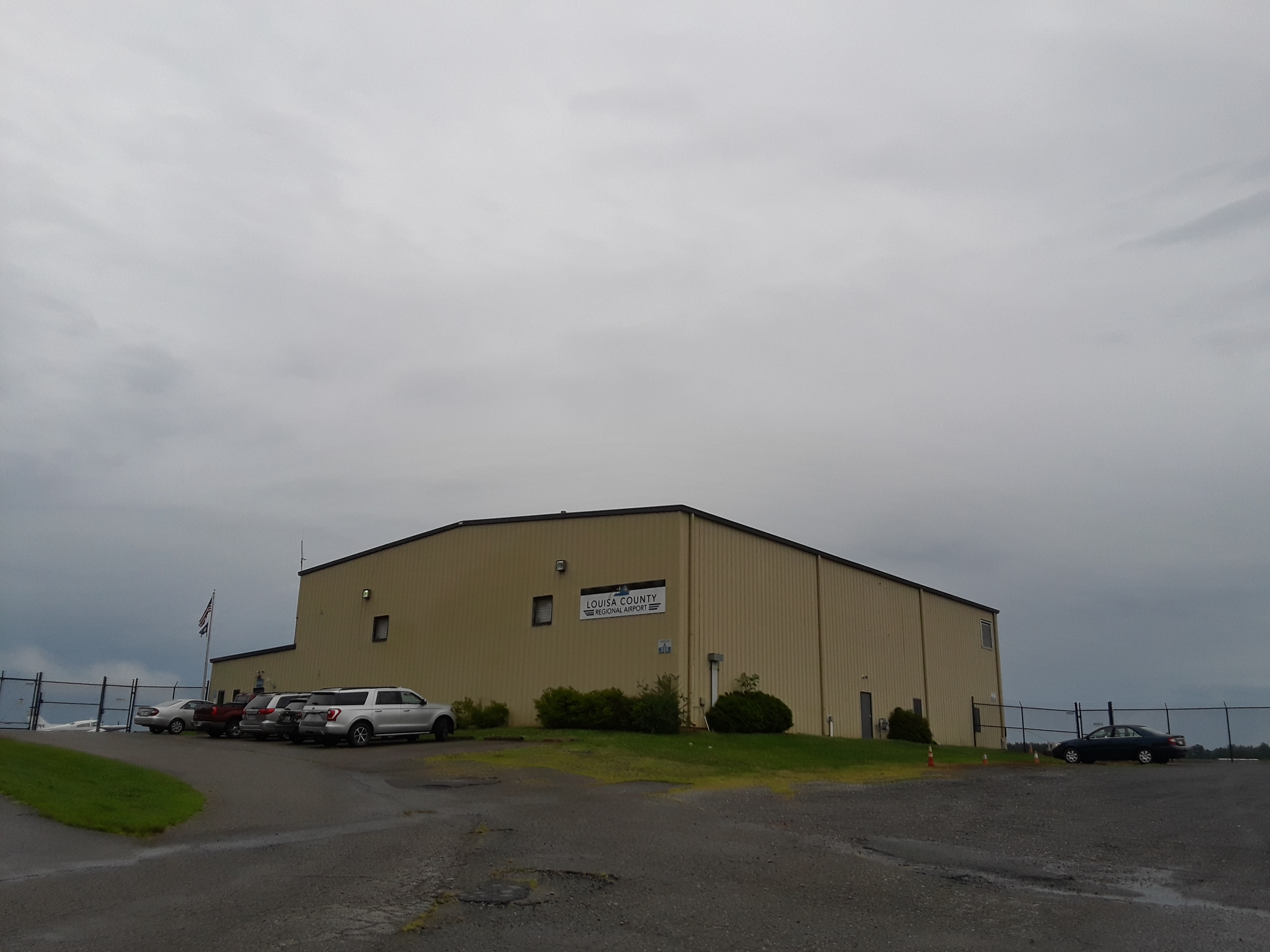
- IATA: LOW; ICAO: KLKU; FAA LID: LKU

Summary
- Airport type: Public
- Owner: Industrial Development Authority of Louisa Co.
- Location: Louisa, Virginia
- Elevation AMSL: 493 ft (150 m)
- Coordinates: 38°00′35″N 077°58′12″W
- Website: https://louisacountyairport.org/
- Interactive map of Louisa County Airport

Runways
Direction	Length		Surface
Direction	ft	m	Surface
9/27	4,301	1,311	Asphalt

Statistics (2008)
- Aircraft operations: 20,987
- Source: Federal Aviation Administration

Louisa County Airport (IATA: LOW, ICAO: KLKU, FAA LID: LKU), also known as Freeman Field, is a public use airport located two nautical miles (4 km) southeast of the central business district of Louisa, a town in Louisa County, Virginia, United States. Although most U.S. airports use the same three-letter location identifier for the FAA and IATA, this airport is assigned LKU by the FAA and LOW by the IATA.

== Facilities and aircraft ==
Louisa County Airport covers an area of 171 acres (69 ha) at an elevation of 493 feet (150 m) above mean sea level. It has one asphalt paved runway designated 9/27 which measures 4,301 by 100 feet (1,311 x 30 m). There is a full-service FBO, Cavalier Aviation, LLC, on-site, with fuel and maintenance. For the 12-month period ending May 30, 2008, the airport had 20,987 aircraft operations, an average of 57 per day: 96% general aviation, 2% air taxi and 2% military.

== Events ==
Louisa County Airport hosts several events throughout the year featuring airplane rides and introductory flight lessons.
