= Green Springs (Trevilians, Virginia) =

Historic house in Virginia, United States

- U.S. National Register of Historic Places
- Virginia Landmarks Register
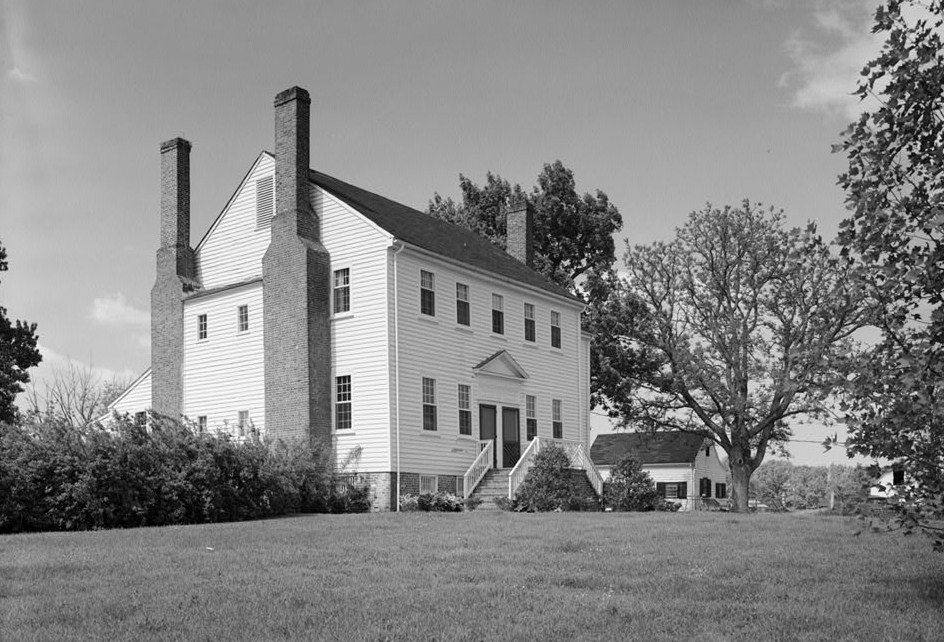
- Green Springs, HABS Photo, 1984

- Location within Virginia Location within the United States
- Location: 0.2 mi. S of VA 617 and 1.5 mi. SW of jct. with VA 640, near Trevilians, Virginia
- Coordinates: 38°00′17.63″N 78°10′49.66″W
- Area: 640 acres (260 ha)
- NRHP reference No.: 72001406
- VLR No.: 054-0057

Significant dates
- Added to NRHP: June 30, 1972
- Designated VLR: May 16, 1972

Green Springs was built in the late 18th century on lands in Louisa County, Virginia assembled by Sylvanus Morris. His son Richard (c.1740-1821) developed 1,746 acres (707 ha) near the mineral springs that gave the property its name and built the two-story frame house. The property stands in an unusually fertile region of central Virginia, surrounded by a number of 18th and 19th century farms and plantations. The district has been designated a National Historic Landmark district, comprising about 14,000 acres (5,700 ha) under scenic easement protection.

== Description ==
The main house is a two-story frame structure with a compact plan. The house forgoes the typical Virginia central-hall plan, employing instead a simple four-room plan on the main floor, with the stairs relegated to a small space at the rear. The two front rooms each have their own entry in the five-bay main elevation. The rear has received a shed-roofed addition, and a two-story frame addition has been added on the west side of the house. The interior features its original woodwork, using simple shapes and patterns. The property includes a number of barns, slave quarters and other dependencies.

== The Morris family ==
Colonel Richard Morris held a number of public offices, including Commissary for the Commonwealth, and was a member of the Virginia House of Delegates in 1788. Morris operated a small resort at the Green Springs with two houses, an icehouse, servant quarters, a blacksmith shop and utility buildings, which were abandoned by Richard's son and heir James Maury Morris.

Green Springs was listed on the National Register of Historic Places on June 30, 1972. It is a component of the Green Springs National Historic Landmark District.
