= Louisa, Virginia =

- Town
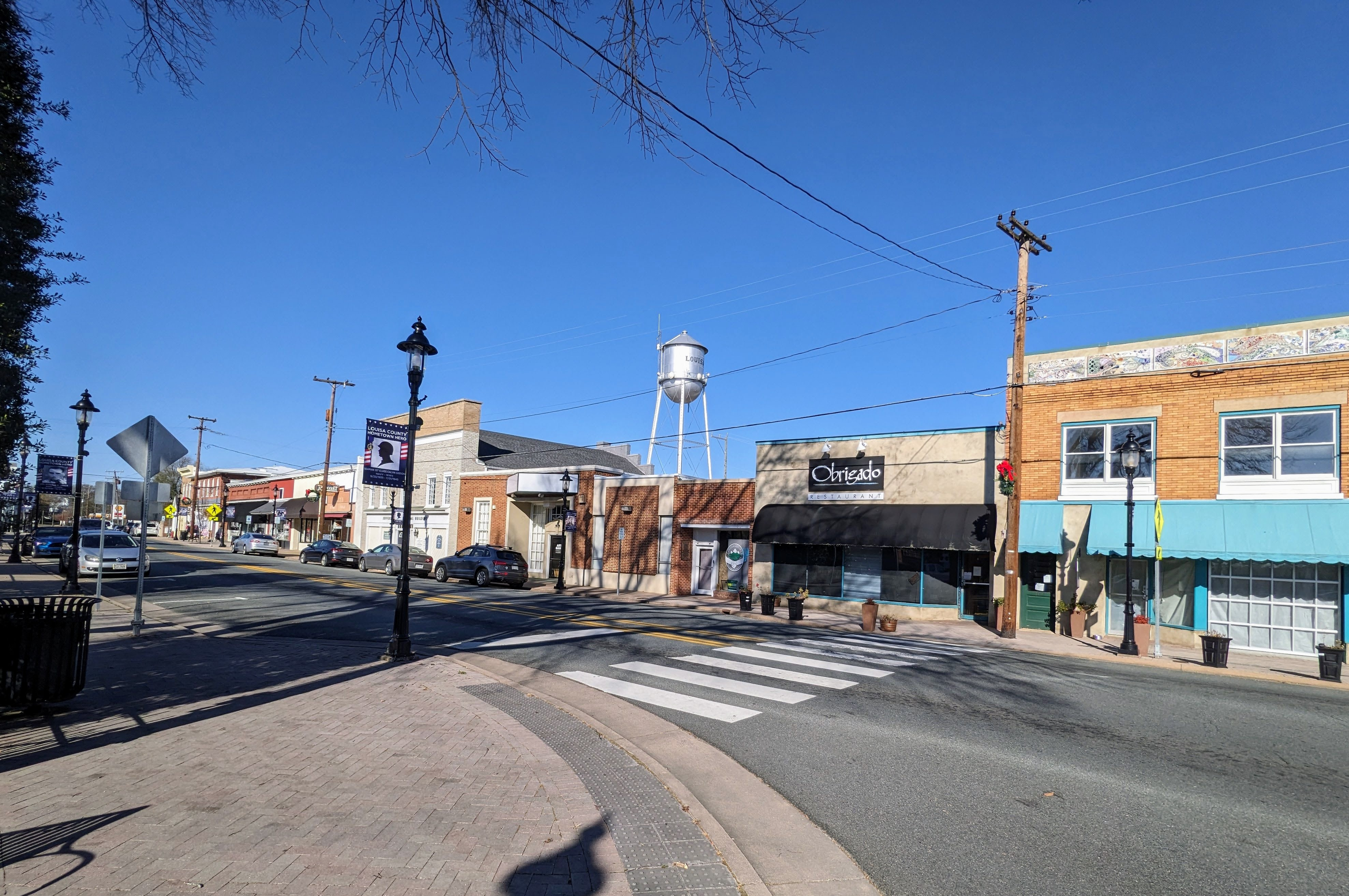
- Main Street, Downtown Louisa

- Seal

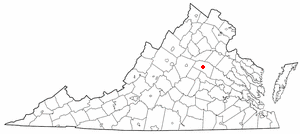
- Location in Virginia
- Coordinates: 38°1′27″N 78°0′6″W
- Country: United States
- State: Virginia
- County: Louisa
- Founded: 1873

Government
  - Mayor: Matthew L. Kersey Jr.
  - Town Manager: Craig M. Buckley

Area
  - Total: 1.84 sq mi (4.77 km^{2})
  - Land: 1.83 sq mi (4.73 km^{2})
  - Water: 0.015 sq mi (0.04 km^{2})
- Elevation: 466 ft (142 m)

Population (2020)
  - Total: 1,987
  - Estimate (2023): 2,170
  - Density: 948.7/sq mi (366.28/km^{2})
- Time zone: UTC−5 (Eastern (EST))
  - Summer (DST): UTC−4 (EDT)
- ZIP Code: 23093
- Area code: 540
- FIPS code: 51-47144
- GNIS feature ID: 1498507
- Website: https://louisava.gov/

Louisa (originally Louisa Court House) is a town in Louisa County, Virginia, United States. The population was 1,983 at the 2020 census. It is the county seat of Louisa County.

== History ==
Louisa Court House was named for the county courthouse constructed in 1742, near the intersection of Courthouse Road (now SR 208) and Main Street/Louisa Road (now SR-22/US-33). The village of Louisa Court House had been the county seat for over a century when it became a strategic location during the Civil War for Virginia's supply and communication lines.

Chartered in 1836 as the Louisa Railroad by the Virginia General Assembly, the Virginia Central Railroad mainline passed through the village. On June 10, 1864, thousands of men and horses of Gen. Fitzhugh Lee's cavalry division camped around the courthouse prior to the Battle of Trevilian Station. The VCR merged into the Chesapeake and Ohio Railroad in 1868 (reorganized as the Chesapeake and Ohio Railway in 1878). The C&O operated the mainline through Louisa over one hundred years, until the Chessie System merged into CSX in the 1980s.

Louisa incorporated by Act of the General Assembly in 1873. Many businesses found advantage in locating near the mainline, especially heavy industries that could transport using the railroad. As the road infrastructure improved and especially since the 1956 development of the interstate highway system's I-64, local businesses transport mainly via semi-truck using US 33.

East of the Town of Louisa on Jeff Davis Highway is the Cooke Industrial Rail Park, a 1400-acre contiguous tract of land with over 1 mile of rail frontage, served by CSX and Buckingham Branch Railroad.

== Geography ==
According to the United States Census Bureau, the city has a total area of 2.21 square miles (4.7 km^{2}), of which 2.20 square miles (4.7 km^{2}) is land and 0.55% is water.

=== Climate ===
Climate data for Louisa, Virginia (1991–2020 normals, extremes 1916–present)
Month	Jan	Feb	Mar	Apr	May	Jun	Jul	Aug	Sep	Oct	Nov	Dec	Year
Record high °F (°C)	80 (27)	82 (28)	89 (32)	96 (36)	99 (37)	101 (38)	108 (42)	105 (41)	104 (40)	98 (37)	88 (31)	79 (26)	108 (42)
Mean daily maximum °F (°C)	45.2 (7.3)	49.4 (9.7)	58.2 (14.6)	69.8 (21.0)	76.0 (24.4)	83.2 (28.4)	86.7 (30.4)	85.3 (29.6)	79.0 (26.1)	68.6 (20.3)	57.4 (14.1)	48.1 (8.9)	67.2 (19.6)
Daily mean °F (°C)	35.3 (1.8)	38.2 (3.4)	45.5 (7.5)	56.1 (13.4)	64.0 (17.8)	71.9 (22.2)	76.0 (24.4)	74.4 (23.6)	67.6 (19.8)	56.5 (13.6)	45.8 (7.7)	38.1 (3.4)	55.8 (13.2)
Mean daily minimum °F (°C)	25.4 (−3.7)	27.0 (−2.8)	32.8 (0.4)	42.3 (5.7)	52.0 (11.1)	60.7 (15.9)	65.2 (18.4)	63.6 (17.6)	56.3 (13.5)	44.4 (6.9)	34.1 (1.2)	28.1 (−2.2)	44.3 (6.8)
Record low °F (°C)	−20 (−29)	−21 (−29)	−5 (−21)	13 (−11)	26 (−3)	36 (2)	37 (3)	36 (2)	29 (−2)	18 (−8)	4 (−16)	−9 (−23)	−21 (−29)
Average precipitation inches (mm)	3.00 (76)	2.74 (70)	3.70 (94)	3.38 (86)	3.97 (101)	4.33 (110)	4.18 (106)	3.68 (93)	4.49 (114)	3.81 (97)	3.59 (91)	3.33 (85)	44.20 (1,123)
Average snowfall inches (cm)	4.5 (11)	6.1 (15)	1.5 (3.8)	0.3 (0.76)	0.0 (0.0)	0.0 (0.0)	0.0 (0.0)	0.0 (0.0)	0.0 (0.0)	0.0 (0.0)	0.1 (0.25)	3.3 (8.4)	15.8 (40)
Average precipitation days (≥ 0.01 in)	9.3	8.3	10.0	10.5	12.2	10.6	10.9	9.2	9.7	8.3	8.8	10.1	117.9
Average snowy days (≥ 0.1 in)	1.8	1.8	0.6	0.0	0.0	0.0	0.0	0.0	0.0	0.0	0.0	1.3	5.5
Source: NOAA

== Demographics ==
Historical population
Census	Pop.	Note	%±
1880	315		—
1900	261		—
1910	318		21.8%
1920	289		−9.1%
1930	301		4.2%
1940	365		21.3%
1950	344		−5.8%
1960	576		67.4%
1970	633		9.9%
1980	932		47.2%
1990	1,088		16.7%
2000	1,401		28.8%
2010	1,555		11.0%
2020	1,987		27.8%
U.S. Decennial Census

=== 2020 census ===
As of the 2020 census, Louisa had a population of 1,987. The median age was 39.1 years. 23.7% of residents were under the age of 18 and 21.6% of residents were 65 years of age or older. For every 100 females there were 85.2 males, and for every 100 females age 18 and over there were 80.9 males age 18 and over.

0.0% of residents lived in urban areas, while 100.0% lived in rural areas.

There were 821 households in Louisa, of which 32.8% had children under the age of 18 living in them. Of all households, 34.6% were married-couple households, 21.1% were households with a male householder and no spouse or partner present, and 37.4% were households with a female householder and no spouse or partner present. About 37.3% of all households were made up of individuals and 19.8% had someone living alone who was 65 years of age or older.

There were 869 housing units, of which 5.5% were vacant. The homeowner vacancy rate was 0.6% and the rental vacancy rate was 5.3%.

Racial composition as of the 2020 census
Race	Number	Percent
White	1,216	61.2%
Black or African American	492	24.8%
American Indian and Alaska Native	6	0.3%
Asian	24	1.2%
Native Hawaiian and Other Pacific Islander	0	0.0%
Some other race	65	3.3%
Two or more races	184	9.3%
Hispanic or Latino (of any race)	137	6.9%

=== 2000 census ===
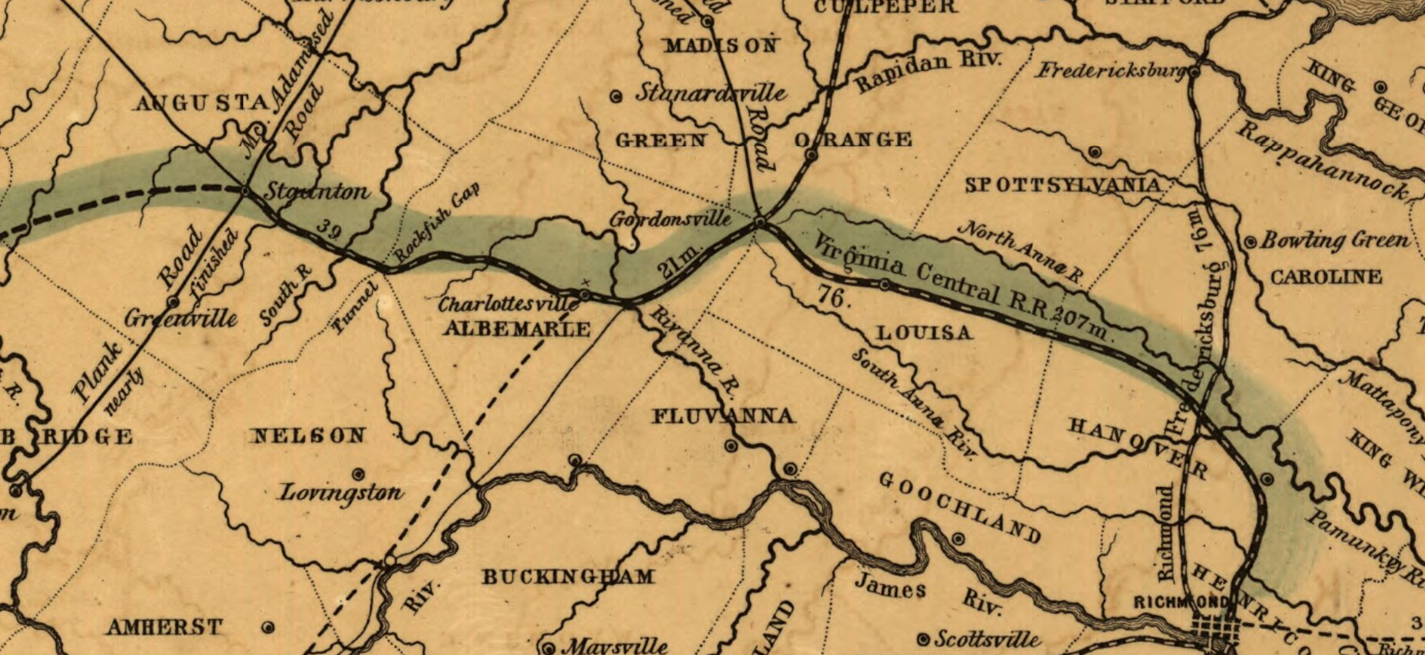
1852 Map of the Virginia Central Railroad

At the 2000 census there were 1,401 people, 584 households, and 331 families in the town. The population density was 766.8 people per square mile (295.6/km^{2}). There were 620 housing units at an average density of 339.4 per square mile (130.8/km^{2}). The racial makeup of the town was 66.81% White, 29.48% African American, 0.79% Native American, 0.71% Asian, 0.79% from other races, and 1.43% from two or more races. Hispanic or Latino of any race were 1.43%.

Of the 584 households 30.0% had children under the age of 18 living with them, 35.6% were married couples living together, 16.4% had a female householder with no husband present, and 43.3% were non-families. Of households, 37.0% were one person and 18.3% were one person aged 65 or older. The average household size was 2.25 and the average family size was 2.93.

The age distribution was 24.8% under the age of 18, 7.9% from 18 to 24, 28.5% from 25 to 44, 19.2% from 45 to 64, and 19.6% 65 or older. The median age was 38 years. For every 100 females, there were 81.5 males. For every 100 females aged 18 and over, there were 73.1 males.

The median household income was $29,519 and the median family income was $42,396. Males had a median income of $27,578 versus $23,188 for females. The per capita income for the town was $17,763. About 14.7% of families and 18.7% of the population were below the poverty line, including 27.9% of those under age 18 and 17.0% of those age 65 or over.

== Arts and culture ==
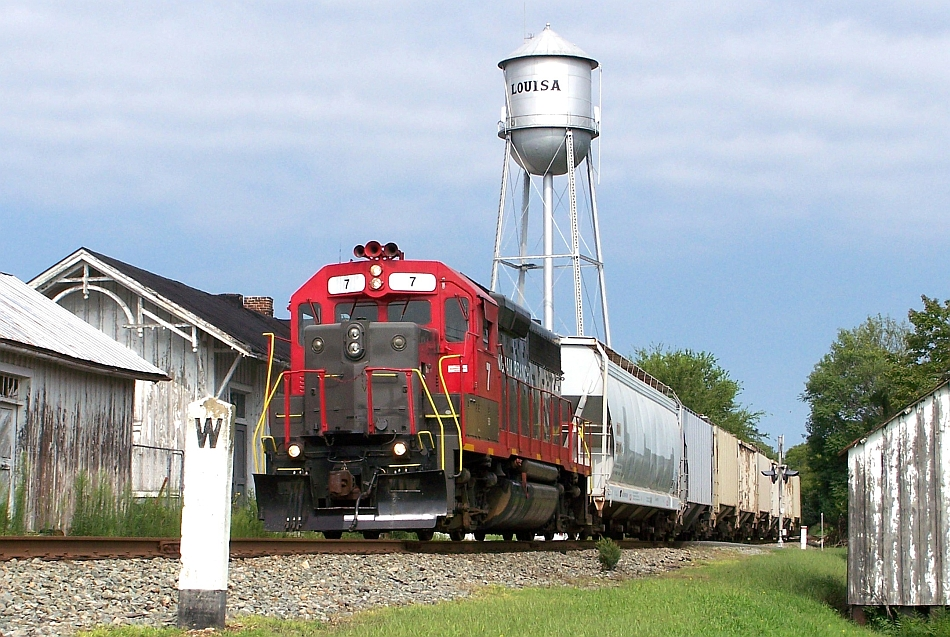
A local train of the Buckingham Branch railroad passes the C&O Depot and water tower in Louisa

Sites listed on the National Register of Historic Places include Bloomington, Boxley Place, Louisa County Courthouse, and Louisa High School

The Twin Oaks Community, an intentional community of 100 people living on 465 acres (1.88 km^{2}), was founded in Louisa in 1967.

== Education ==
Louisa County Public Schools covers the entire county.

Jefferson-Madison Regional Library is the regional library system that provides services to the citizens of Louisa.

== Notable people ==
- Brandon Smith, linebacker for the Philadelphia Eagles
- Owen Smith, racing driver
- Kerry Wynn, defensive end for the Cincinnati Bengals
