= List of islands of Virginia =

Islands of the state of Virginia
- Location of Virginia within the United States

Geography
- Location: Virginia

Administration
- United States
- State: Virginia
- Largest island: Chincoteague Island

The following is a list of named islands of the state of Virginia. According to the USGS, there are 307 named islands, and many more unnamed ones. Over half of the named islands are in the James River, Chesapeake Bay/Pocomoke Sound, or are part of the Virginia Barrier Islands.

Island Name	Body of water	Area (sq mi)	County/Independent city	Coordinates	Notes
Abby Counts Island	Clinch River	0.01	Russell County	36°56′15″N 82°09′51″W	
Adams Island	Atlantic Ocean		Northampton County	37°05′27″N 75°56′51″W	
Allens Island	York River	0.02	Gloucester County	37°15′16″N 76°25′39″W	
Angel Island	Potomac River	<0.01	Fairfax County	38°45′36″N 77°02′53″W	
Assateague Island	Atlantic Ocean	24	Accomack County (and Worcester County, Maryland)	38°05′30″N 75°12′14″W	15.7 square miles are in Virginia
Assawoman Island	Atlantic Ocean		Accomack County	37°47′30″N 75°31′09″W	
Avens Island	South Fork of the Holston River		Washington County	36°37′20″N 81°57′27″W	A historical island, i.e. it no longer exists
Avery Island	Lynnhaven Bay		Virginia Beach	36°52′38″N 76°03′48″W	
Back Creek Island	Appomattox River	0.15	Chesterfield County	37°17′36″N 77°21′29″W	
Baker Island	New River	0.05	Wythe County	36°53′34″N 80°51′25″W	
Ballast Tump	Atlantic Ocean	0.11	Accomack County	37°53′19″N 75°28′11″W	
Bamboo Island	Little Wicomico River	<0.01	Northumberland County	37°53′15″N 76°14′45″W	
Barleys Island	Lake Anna	<0.01	Louisa County	38°01′28″N 77°45′54″W	
Beach Island	Chesapeake Bay	0.04	Accomack County	37°47′21″N 75°48′57″W	
Bear Island	North Anna River	0.07	Hanover County	37°49′15″N 77°24′43″W	
Belle Isle	James River	0.08	Richmond	37°31′45″N 77°27′15″W	
Belle Isle	Rappahannock River	0.29	Lancaster County	37°46′44″N 76°36′28″W	
Berkley Island	Piankatank River	0.02	Middlesex County	37°31′28″N 76°26′06″W	
Big Ball Island	Back Bay	0.26	Virginia Beach	36°33′45″N 75°53′15″W	
Big Island	James River	0.07	Amherst County	37°32′49″N 79°21′51″W	The nearby CDP of Big Island, Virginia, is named after this island. As the James River is the county line, the island is in Amherst County and the CDP is in Bedford County
Big Island	James River	0.14	Fluvanna County	37°44′06″N 78°22′12″W	
Big Island	Chesapeake Bay	0.25	Gloucester County	37°16′20″N 76°22′40″W	
Big Island	Roanoke River	0.06	Mecklenburg County	36°33′49″N 78°28′09″W	
Big Island	Pamunkey River	0.57	New Kent County	37°35′31″N 77°03′04″W	
Big Island	Back Bay	<0.01	Virginia Beach	36°35′33″N 75°53′28″W	
Big Mumfort Island	York River	0.01	Gloucester County	37°16′22″N 76°30′55″W	
Bills Island	Lake Anna	<0.01	Louisa County	38°00′55″N 77°48′59″W	
Bird Island	Potomac River	<0.01	Fairfax County	38°45′43″N 77°02′44″W	
Blacksnake Island	Lloyd Bay	0.01	Poquoson	37°09′25″N 76°21′30″W	
Boatwrights Island	James River	0.04	Fluvanna County	37°43′20″N 78°12′59″W	
Bolling Island	James River	0.65	Goochland County	37°38′51″N 78°02′35″W	Namesake of the nearby Bolling Island plantation house
Bones Island	Lake Anna	<0.01	Louisa County	38°00′02″N 77°43′54″W	
Boyds Island	Lake Gaston		Mecklenburg County	36°33′03″N 78°05′49″W	A historical island, i.e. it no longer exists
Boykins Island	Potomac Creek		Stafford County	38°20′55″N 77°19′24″W	
Bread Island	Shipps Bay		Virginia Beach	36°41′21″N 75°55′51″W	
Broken Island	Rivanna River	<0.01	Fluvanna County	37°54′11″N 78°17′12″W	
Brown's Island	James River	0.04	Richmond	37°32′01″N 77°26′26″W	
Buckle Island	Back Bay	0.02	Virginia Beach	36°33′21″N 75°54′29″W	
Buford Island	James River	0.13	Nelson County	37°40′50″N 78°39′16″W	
Buggs Island	Roanoke River	0.25	Mecklenburg County	36°36′18″N 78°17′16″W	
Burwell Island	Shenandoah River	0.24	Clarke County	39°03′17″N 77°59′08″W	
Busbees Island	Lake Anna	<0.01	Louisa County	38°01′22″N 77°45′38″W	
Buzzard Island	Appomattox River	<0.01	Chesterfield County	37°18′52″N 77°17′36″W	
Buzzard Island	Nansemond River	<0.01	Suffolk	36°44′43″N 76°34′30″W	
Buzzard Islands	James River		Amherst County	37°24′40″N 79°04′02″W	
Camp Island	Chesapeake Bay		Accomack County	37°48′26″N 75°47′32″W	
Candy Island	James River	0.01	Isle of Wight County	36°56′28″N 76°29′25″W	
Carmines Islands	York River	0.05	Gloucester County	37°16′50″N 76°31′57″W	
Carter Island	New River	0.05	Wythe County	36°55′31″N 80°49′01″W	
Cat Island	Appomattox River	0.07	Chesterfield County	37°18′09″N 77°21′55″W	
Catlett Islands	York River	0.16	Gloucester County	37°17′54″N 76°33′12″W	
Cedar Island	Pocomoke Sound	0.01	Accomack County	37°50′52″N 75°41′59″W	
Cedar Island	Atlantic Ocean	6.35	Accomack County	37°37′55″N 75°36′46″W	
Cedar Island	Back Bay	0.06	Virginia Beach	36°35′55″N 75°55′17″W	
Cedar Island	Potomac River	<0.01	Westmoreland County	38°07′59″N 76°43′31″W	
Chandlers Island	Pamunkey River		King William County, New Kent County	37°32′54″N 76°56′35″W	
Charters Island	Wayne Creek, tributary of the Lafayette River	<0.01	Norfolk	36°53′43″N 76°16′00″W	
Cheeseman Island	Chesapeake Bay		Accomack County	37°56′08″N 76°02′17″W	
Chestnut Island	James River	0.03	Amherst County	37°29′08″N 79°12′53″W	
Chincoteague Island	Chincoteague Bay	37.48	Accomack County	37°56′18″N 75°21′42″W	
Chopawamsic Island	Potomac River	0.02	Prince William County	38°30′29″N 77°17′49″W	
Christian Island	James River	0.03	Amherst County	37°30′20″N 78°54′37″W	
Cleveland Island	James River	0.03	Fluvanna County	37°43′23″N 78°20′43″W	
Clump Island	Chesapeake Bay	0.03	Accomack County	37°54′17″N 75°54′09″W	
Clydes Island	Kerr Lake	<0.01	Mecklenburg County	36°35′14″N 78°27′45″W	
Cobb Island	Atlantic Ocean	1.15	Northampton County	37°19′44″N 75°44′50″W	
Cobbs Island	Appomattox River	0.18	Chesterfield County	37°18′58″N 77°20′56″W	
Coconut Island	Potomac River	<0.01	Fairfax County	38°46′16″N 77°02′43″W	
Coleman Island	Rappahannock River	0.07	Essex County	37°55′02″N 76°51′08″W	
Conrad Island	Belmont Bay	<0.01	Fairfax County, Prince William County	38°38′54″N 77°13′15″W	
Cool Spring Island	Blackwater River	<0.01	Southampton County	36°41′00″N 76°55′29″W	
Cooper Island	Kerr Lake	<0.01	Mecklenburg County	36°33′53″N 78°25′07″W	
Cow Island	Chesapeake Bay	0.30	Poquoson	37°09′41″N 76°22′05″W	
Crags Island	Dan River	0.02	Pittsylvania County	36°34′01″N 79°22′21″W	
Craney Island	Elizabeth River	4.82	Portsmouth	36°53′33″N 76°21′34″W	
Crank Island	Chesapeake Bay	0.23	Northumberland County	37°41′30″N 76°18′59″W	
Cuba Island	Chesapeake Bay	0.02	Gloucester County	37°15′41″N 76°25′34″W	
Cunninghams Island	James River	0.10	Nelson County	37°38′26″N 78°46′51″W	
Daingerfield Island	Potomac River	0.17	Alexandria	38°49′44″N 77°02′26″W	
Daniel Island	James River	0.10	Amherst County, Lynchburg	37°25′51″N 79°08′43″W	
Deal Island	Back Bay	0.38	Virginia Beach (and Currituck County, North Carolina)	36°32′45″N 75°53′29″W	0.02 square miles are in Virginia
Deer Island	Philpott Lake	0.24	Franklin County	36°48′04″N 80°02′23″W	
Dicks Island	Lake Anna	<0.01	Louisa County	38°00′47″N 77°45′16″W	
Dix Hammock	Pocomoke Sound		Accomack County	37°48′05″N 75°42′13″W	
Does Hammock	Pocomoke Sound	<0.01	Accomack County	37°54′17″N 75°53′26″W	
Dog Island	James River	0.07	Nelson County	37°42′39″N 78°39′20″W	
Dumpling Island	Nansemond River	0.02	Suffolk	36°48′37″N 76°33′16″W	
Dyke Island	Potomac River	0.01	Fairfax County	38°46′20″N 77°02′48″W	
East Island	James River	0.02	Isle of Wight County	36°57′45″N 76°29′55″W	
Elk Island	James River	1.76	Goochland County	37°43′00″N 78°05′44″W	
Eppes Island	James River	1.06	Charles City County	37°19′33″N 77°15′03″W	
Evans Island	Monroe Bay	0.01	Westmoreland County	38°14′10″N 76°58′10″W	
Farrar's Island	James River		Chesterfield County	37°22′07″N 77°22′22″W	
Feagans Island	James River	0.11	Amherst County	37°23′21″N 79°04′24″W	
Fields Island	Kerr Lake		Mecklenburg County	36°35′59″N 78°29′05″W	A historical island, i.e. it no longer exists
Finneys Island	Chesapeake Bay	0.16	Accomack County	37°41′11″N 75°51′38″W	
Fish House Island	Lynnhaven River	<0.01	Virginia Beach	36°54′18″N 76°05′15″W	
Fishbone Island	Chesapeake Bay	0.01	Accomack County	37°52′59″N 76°00′11″W	
Fisherman Island	Atlantic Ocean	2.89	Northampton County	37°05′35″N 75°57′49″W	
Fleets Island	Chesapeake Bay	1.16	Lancaster County	37°37′16″N 76°17′20″W	
Fox Island	James River		James City County	37°12′01″N 76°45′39″W	
Gilliams Island	Appomattox River	0.25	Chesterfield County	37°17′57″N 77°21′38″W	
Gilligans Island	Kerr Lake	<0.01	Mecklenburg County	36°34′49″N 78°21′24″W	
Glass Island	Mattaponi River	0.05	King William County	37°32′38″N 76°47′23″W	
Goat Island	Staunton River	0.06	Campbell County	37°05′05″N 79°06′46″W	
Goat Island	Rappahannock River	0.17	King George County	38°11′15″N 77°14′09″W	
Goats Island	Kerr Lake	0.01	Mecklenburg County	36°34′44″N 78°28′56″W	
Godwin Island	Atlantic Ocean	2.11	Northampton County	37°13′04″N 75°49′49″W	
Goodwin Islands	York River	1.21	York County	37°13′14″N 76°24′05″W	
Goosby Island	James River	0.01	Buckingham County	37°45′20″N 78°34′52″W	
Goose Island	Appomattox River	0.09	Chesterfield County	37°17′37″N 77°40′51″W	
Goose Island	Chesapeake Bay	0.10	King William County	37°52′00″N 76°00′16″W	
Goose Island	James River	0.02	Newport News	37°09′47″N 76°36′43″W	
Gordon Island	Chickahominy River	1.20	James City County	37°16′26″N 76°51′55″W	
Grassy Island	James River		Botetourt County	37°35′59″N 79°44′33″W	A historical island, i.e. it no longer exists
Grays Island	Clinch River	0.03	Scott County	36°48′20″N 82°30′03″W	
Great Fox Island	Chesapeake Bay	0.05	Accomack County	37°53′47″N 75°54′08″W	
Great Island	Popes Creek	<0.01	Westmoreland County	38°11′14″N 76°54′37″W	
Green Harbor Island	Pocomoke Sound	<0.01	Accomack County	37°54′35″N 75°53′00″W	
Gregory Island	James River	0.10	Fluvanna County	37°44′09″N 78°24′05″W	
Grog Island	Chesapeake Bay		Lancaster County	37°40′02″N 76°19′34″W	
Gwynn's Island	Chesapeake Bay	2.26	Mathews County	37°30′26″N 76°17′25″W	
Hale Islands	Staunton River	0.22	Campbell County	37°03′45″N 79°05′12″W	
Halfmoon Island	Pocomoke Sound	0.02	Accomack County	37°49′17″N 75°44′28″W	
Halls Island	Appomattox River	0.52	Chesterfield County	37°16′36″N 77°21′57″W	
Hardin Island	Shenandoah River	0.08	Clarke County, Warren County	39°00′51″N 78°03′28″W	
Hatcher Island	James River	0.40	Chesterfield County	37°23′09″N 77°21′53″W	
Herring Island	Chesapeake Bay		Accomack County	37°54′01″N 76°00′29″W	
Hicks Island	Diascund Creek	0.16	James City County	37°23′59″N 76°53′34″W	
Hines Island	North Fork of the Holston River	0.01	Washington County	36°46′19″N 82°06′56″W	
Hog Island	Potomac River	0.01	Fairfax County	38°45′10″N 77°02′47″W	
Hog Island	Chesapeake Bay	0.02	Gloucester County	37°15′58″N 76°23′05″W	
Hog Island	Dan River		Halifax County	36°41′06″N 78°41′06″W	A historical island, i.e. it no longer exists
Hog Island	Potomac River		Northumberland County	38°01′19″N 76°28′18″W	
Hog Island	James River	1.72	Surry County	37°10′53″N 76°40′41″W	
Hog Island	Atlantic Ocean	5.24	Northampton County	37°24′58″N 75°41′28″W	
Holly Bluff Island	Magothy Bay	0.01	Northampton County	37°07′58″N 75°56′19″W	
Honeymoon Island	Chesapeake Bay		Northampton County	37°23′25″N 75°58′50″W	
Horse Island	Chesapeake Bay		Northampton County	37°28′14″N 75°57′27″W	
Horse Island	Back Bay	0.36	Virginia Beach	36°33′38″N 75°53′35″W	
House Island	Pocomoke Sound		Accomack County (and Somerset County, Maryland)	37°54′40″N 75°53′34″W	
Humes Island	Lynnhaven Bay	0.04	Virginia Beach	36°53′43″N 76°05′16″W	
Hundred Islands	Kerr Lake		Mecklenburg County	36°35′38″N 78°26′10″W	A historical island, i.e. it no longer exists
Jacks Island	Pocomoke Sound	0.02	Accomack County	37°48′49″N 75°43′06″W	
Jamestown Island	James River	2.44	James City County	37°12′13″N 76°45′32″W	
Jerdone Island	Lake Anna	1.44	Louisa County	38°00′30″N 77°44′57″W	
Jetts Island	Lake Anna	0.01	Spotsylvania County	38°06′58″N 77°50′28″W	
Jobes Island	Pocomoke Sound	0.05	Accomack County	37°50′18″N 75°41′40″W	
Keller Island	South Holston Lake		Washington County	36°36′58″N 81°59′06″W	A historical island, i.e. it no longer exists
Knotts Island	Back Bay / Currituck Sound	5.48	Virginia Beach (and Currituck County, North Carolina)	36°31′57″N 75°55′23″W	1.68 square miles are in Virginia
Laucks Island	Rappahannock River	0.13	Stafford County	38°19′11″N 77°28′55″W	
Lewis Island	Kerr Lake		Mecklenburg County	36°36′34″N 78°31′27″W	A historical island, i.e. it no longer exists
Little Ball Island	Back Bay	0.01	Virginia Beach	36°34′12″N 75°53′19″W	
Little Beach	Swash Bay	0.08	Accomack County	37°31′50″N 75°38′41″W	
Little Cedar Island	Back Bay	0.02	Virginia Beach	36°35′20″N 75°55′25″W	
Little Cobb Island	Cobb Bay	0.02	Northampton County	37°18′05″N 75°47′12″W	
Little Fox Island	Pocomoke Sound		Accomack County	37°50′00″N 75°53′33″W	
Little Fox Islands	Chesapeake Bay	<0.01	Accomack County	37°52′04″N 75°53′34″W	
Little Island	Pamunkey River	0.43	New Kent County	37°35′49″N 77°03′47″W	
Little Mumfort Island	York River	<0.01	Gloucester County	37°15′49″N 76°30′44″W	
Long Island	Appomattox River	0.04	Chesterfield County	37°17′55″N 77°21′14″W	
Long Island	Sand Bay / Shipps Bay	1.20	Virginia Beach	36°39′46″N 75°56′05″W	
Long Island	Staunton River	0.89	Campbell County	37°04′24″N 79°06′18″W	
Lower Bernard Island	Pocomoke Sound	0.02	Accomack County	37°51′41″N 75°43′46″W	
Lowes Island	Potomac River	0.62	Loudoun County	39°03′35″N 77°21′08″W	
Lukes Island	Rappahannock River		Richmond County	38°03′22″N 76°54′51″W	
Marks Island	Pocomoke Sound	0.04	Accomack County	37°49′03″N 75°41′58″W	
Marsh Island	Bennett Creek	<0.01	Poquoson	37°09′09″N 76°22′15″W	
Mayos Island	James River	0.03	Richmond	37°31′47″N 77°25′59″W	
Metompkin Island	Atlantic Ocean	0.90	Accomack County	37°45′08″N 75°32′41″W	
Mill Island	Clinch River	0.03	Scott County	36°50′36″N 82°27′29″W	
Mink Island	Atlantic Ocean	1.89	Northampton County	37°11′51″N 75°49′52″W	
Mockhorn Island	Magothy Bay / Mockhorn Bay / South Bay	14.59	Northampton County	37°14′19″N 75°53′17″W	
Morris Island	Chincoteague Bay	0.49	Accomack County	37°56′40″N 75°19′44″W	
Mosquito Island	Rappahannock River	0.03	Lancaster County	37°36′59″N 76°21′03″W	
Mountain Island	New River	0.02	Grayson County (and Alleghany County, North Carolina)	36°34′17″N 081°12′7″W	Less than 0.01 square miles are in Virginia
Mulberry Island	Rappahannock River	0.67	Richmond County	37°59′37″N 76°53′30″W	
Mulberry Island	James River	8.29	Newport News	37°06′55″N 76°35′25″W	Referred as an island, it is actually a peninsula
Myrtle Island	Atlantic Ocean	0.57	Northampton County	37°11′36″N 75°49′00″W	
Nelsons Island	Kerr Lake		Halifax County	36°40′46″N 78°37′55″W	A historical island, i.e. it no longer exists
North Thimble Island	Chesapeake Bay	0.02	Virginia Beach	36°58′57″N 76°06′21″W	Where the Chesapeake Bay Bridge–Tunnel converts between a bridge and a tunnel
Oak Island	Northwest branch of Back River		Poquoson	37°06′49″N 76°21′22″W	
Oak Island	Nansemond River	0.08	Suffolk	36°44′46″N 76°34′09″W	
Occoneechee Island	Kerr Lake		Halifax County	36°38′54″N 78°35′02″W	A historical island, i.e. it no longer exists
Old Beach	Pocomoke Sound		Accomack County	37°47′43″N 75°48′51″W	
Old Tree Island	Pocomoke Sound		Accomack County	37°51′27″N 75°40′45″W	
Parchaby Tump	Hog Island Bay	0.03	Northampton County	37°21′52″N 75°46′10″W	
Parker Island	Shenandoah River	0.04	Clarke County	39°08′43″N 77°51′51″W	
Parkers Island	Chesapeake Bay	0.13	Accomack County	37°42′16″N 75°51′16″W	
Parkers Island	Yeocomico River		Westmoreland County	38°02′18″N 76°32′22″W	
Parramore Island	Atlantic Ocean	8.83	Accomack County	37°32′19″N 75°37′41″W	
Parrott Island	Rappahannock River	0.03	Middlesex County	37°35′36″N 76°25′04″W	
Parsons Island	Chickahominy River	0.11	Charles City County	37°20′34″N 76°53′10″W	
Patowmack Island	Potomac River	0.03	Fairfax County	39°03′16″N 77°19′11″W	
Paynes Island	Rappahannock River	0.53	Essex County	38°02′21″N 76°55′19″W	
Peavine Island	Mattaponi River		King and Queen County	37°43′26″N 77°01′05″W	
Pendleton Island	Clinch River	0.04	Scott County	36°45′33″N 82°35′43″W	
Percivals Island	James River	0.09	Amherst County	37°24′23″N 79°07′42″W	
Peters Hammock	Pocomoke Sound	<0.01	Accomack County	37°49′33″N 75°42′37″W	
Peters Tump	Pocomoke Sound	0.01	Accomack County	37°49′36″N 75°42′13″W	
Pettit Island	Rivanna River	0.01	Fluvanna County	37°53′21″N 78°16′25″W	
Pettyjohn Island	James River	0.16	Amherst County	37°29′42″N 78°56′41″W	
Piney Island	Chincoteague Bay		Accomack County	37°55′31″N 75°21′14″W	
Pitts Island	Chincoteague Bay	0.31	Accomack County	38°01′03″N 75°15′58″W	Less than 0.01 square miles are in Maryland
Plumtree Island	Chesapeake Bay		Poquoson	37°07′31″N 76°17′41″W	
Williams Island	James River	0.15	Richmond	37°33′32″N 77°31′21″W	
Pope Island	Blackwater River		Isle of Wight County	36°53′44″N 76°48′46″W	
Government Island	Aquia Creek	0.02	Stafford County	38°26′53″N 77°23′03″W	
Purtan Island	York River		Gloucester County	37°25′17″N 76°40′36″W	
Queen Ridge	Chesapeake Bay	0.01	King William County	37°51′49″N 75°59′43″W	
Rabbit Island	Philpott Lake	0.01	Patrick County	36°48′25″N 080°04′4″W	
Raccoon Island	Magothy Bay	0.05	Northampton County	37°07′36″N 75°56′27″W	
Ragged Island	Back Bay	0.80	Virginia Beach	36°37′43″N 75°56′24″W	
Ragged Island	James River		Isle of Wight County	36°57′49″N 76°30′45″W	
Reach Hammock	Tangier Sound		Accomack County	37°52′53″N 75°59′02″W	
Reedy Island	Dan River	0.04	Danville	36°34′26″N 79°22′34″W	
Revel Island	Revel Island Bay	1.69	Accomack County	37°29′46″N 75°40′14″W	
Rigby Island	Chesapeake Bay	<0.01	Mathews County	37°27′00″N 76°15′23″W	
River Bend Island	Lake Anna		Spotsylvania County	38°02′04″N 77°44′15″W	
Robbies Island	Lake Anna		Louisa County	37°59′44″N 77°45′02″W	
Robinson Crusoe Island	Shenandoah River	0.02	Clarke County	39°01′57″N 78°00′29″W	
Rock Island	James River	0.04	Albemarle County	37°45′50″N 78°32′25″W	
Rock Island	Lake Anna	<0.01	Louisa County	38°01′48″N 77°47′24″W	
Rock Island Haul	Back Bay	0.05	Virginia Beach	36°37′57″N 75°57′32″W	
Rogue Island	Pocomoke Sound	0.01	Accomack County	37°46′18″N 75°47′55″W	
Rogue Island	Hog Island Bay	0.34	Northampton County	37°23′02″N 75°43′40″W	
Roman Rock	Kegotank Bay	<0.01	Accomack County	37°48′08″N 75°31′54″W	
Rose Valley Island	Lake Anna	<0.01	Spotsylvania County	38°06′10″N 77°51′25″W	
Russell Island	Pocomoke Sound	0.24	Accomack County	37°48′10″N 75°46′26″W	
Sabot Island	James River	0.69	Goochland County	37°35′35″N 77°44′02″W	
Sandy Island	Hog Island Bay / Sandy Island Bay	0.73	Accomack County	37°29′31″N 75°42′51″W	
Sandy Island	Chesapeake Bay		Northampton County	37°17′04″N 76°01′30″W	
Savage Island	Pocomoke Sound	0.33	Accomack County	37°47′16″N 75°45′49″W	
Saxis Island	Pocomoke Sound	0.26	Accomack County	37°55′34″N 75°43′21″W	
Scarborough Island	Chesapeake Bay	0.02	Accomack County	37°41′11″N 75°52′09″W	
Scott Island	Pocomoke Sound		Accomack County	37°48′24″N 75°45′19″W	
Scotts Island	Rappahannock River	0.01	Stafford County	38°18′15″N 77°27′26″W	
Sedge Island	Chesapeake Bay	<0.01	Accomack County	37°56′29″N 76°02′03″W	
Seven Islands	James River		Fluvanna County	37°44′15″N 78°23′02″W	
Shackley Island	Nansemond River	<0.01	Suffolk	36°50′00″N 76°33′43″W	
Shanks Island	Chesapeake Bay		Accomack County	37°55′18″N 76°02′23″W	
Sheep Island	Bennett Creek	0.02	Poquoson	37°09′09″N 76°21′26″W	
Shell Island	Sand Bay	0.01	Virginia Beach	36°39′20″N 75°55′32″W	
Ship Shoal Island	Atlantic Ocean		Northampton County	37°13′11″N 75°48′08″W	
Showman Island	Lake Anna	<0.01	Louisa County	38°02′06″N 77°47′59″W	
Shuler Island	Shenandoah River	0.06	Page County	38°29′53″N 78°37′47″W	
Simon Island	Back Bay	0.01	Virginia Beach (and Currituck County, North Carolina)	36°33′08″N 75°53′43″W	Less than 0.01 square miles are in North Carolina
Simpson Island	Chickahominy River	0.17	James City County	37°18′58″N 76°51′48″W	
Simpson Island	Back Bay		Virginia Beach	36°33′51″N 75°57′30″W	
Skidmore Island	Magothy Bay	0.09	Northampton County	37°08′15″N 75°55′41″W	
Smith Hammocks	Chincoteague Bay		Accomack County	37°57′50″N 75°18′41″W	
Smith Island	Chesapeake Bay	6.18	Accomack County (and Somerset County, Maryland)	37°58′29″N 76°01′21″W	1.44 square miles are in Virginia
Smith Island	Atlantic Ocean	3.46	Northampton County	37°08′39″N 75°52′11″W	
Smith Islands	James River	0.18	Nelson County	37°32′51″N 78°51′30″W	
Snake Island	Farnham Creek, tributary of the Rappahannock River		Richmond County	37°49′37″N 76°40′37″W	
Snake Island	Buckner Creek	0.01	Westmoreland County	38°08′17″N 76°42′48″W	
South Buckle Island	Back Bay	0.07	Virginia (and Currituck County, North Carolina)	36°32′46″N 75°54′19″W	Also known as Man Island or Mon Island; less than 0.01 square miles are in Virginia
South Island	Chesapeake Bay		Northampton County	37°28′09″N 75°57′46″W	
South Thimble Island	Chesapeake Bay	0.02	Virginia Beach	36°57′53″N 76°06′48″W	Where the Chesapeake Bay Bridge–Tunnel converts between a bridge and a tunnel
Spicers Island	James River	0.02	Fluvanna County	37°43′07″N 78°13′14″W	
Sunken Island	Appomattox River	0.02	Chesterfield County	37°18′53″N 77°20′44″W	
Sunning Island	Lake Anna		Louisa County	38°06′56″N 77°55′06″W	
Swash Hole Island	James River	<0.01	Newport News	37°06′25″N 76°36′04″W	
Swift Island	James River	0.02	Nelson County	37°39′30″N 78°43′07″W	
Sycamore Island	James River	0.05	Nelson County	37°40′42″N 78°39′31″W	
Tangier Island	Chesapeake Bay	0.63	Accomack County	37°49′42″N 75°59′31″W	
Terrys Island	Kerr Lake		Mecklenburg County	36°35′18″N 78°25′16″W	A historical island, i.e. it no longer exists
The Flats	Chesapeake Bay		King William County	37°51′26″N 76°00′00″W	
The Hammocks	Hog Island Bay	0.07	Northampton County	37°26′54″N 75°49′36″W	
The Island	Pamunkey River		King William County	37°40′56″N 77°08′35″W	
The Notch	Pocomoke Sound		Accomack County	37°47′47″N 75°43′40″W	
The Shells	Chesapeake Bay		King William County	37°51′36″N 75°59′41″W	
Thorofare Hill	Pocomoke Sound	<0.01	Accomack County	37°47′56″N 75°43′48″W	
Thorofare Island	Chesapeake Bay	<0.01	Accomack County	37°52′56″N 75°59′54″W	
Thorofare Island	Warwick River	0.01	Newport News	37°06′31″N 76°34′04″W	
Thurf Marsh Islands	Assateague Bay		Accomack County	37°57′51″N 75°19′02″W	
Thurman Island	Lake Anna	<0.01	Spotsylvania County	38°03′42″N 77°46′11″W	
Tisdale Island	Kerr Lake		Mecklenburg County	36°37′06″N 78°32′18″W	A historical island, i.e. it no longer exists
Tobacco Island	Pocomoke Sound	0.81	Accomack County	37°46′00″N 75°46′50″W	
Toby Islands	Chincoteague Bay		Accomack County	38°00′59″N 75°16′54″W	
Toms Island	Lake Anna	<0.01	Louisa County	38°00′33″N 77°47′27″W	
Treasure Island	James River	0.05	Amherst County	37°26′12″N 79°09′09″W	
Treasure Island	Shenandoah River	0.02	Warren County	39°00′24″N 78°03′26″W	
Trent Island	Lower Machodoc Creek		Westmoreland County	38°07′50″N 76°38′47″W	
Tuckahoe Island	James River	1.17	Henrico County	37°33′39″N 77°37′10″W	
Tunnels Island	Pocomoke Sound	0.84	Accomack County	37°54′16″N 75°43′47″W	
Turkey Island	James River	1.90	Chesterfield County	37°21′55″N 77°15′32″W	
Turkey Island	Philpott Lake	0.04	Patrick County	36°47′58″N 80°02′42″W	
Upper Bernard Island	Pocomoke Sound	0.01	Accomack County	37°52′14″N 75°43′07″W	
Upper Tump	Chesapeake Bay	<0.01	Accomack County	37°52′47″N 76°00′43″W	
Vicks Island	Nottoway River	<0.01	Southampton County	36°44′59″N 77°07′25″W	
Walkers Tumps	Revel Island Bay	<0.01	Accomack County	37°30′16″N 75°41′52″W	
Wallops Island	Atlantic Ocean	7.17	Accomack County	37°51′11″N 75°28′27″W	
Watts Island	Chesapeake Bay	0.31	Accomack County	37°48′00″N 75°53′37″W	
Webb Island	Pocomoke Sound	0.15	Accomack County	37°48′13″N 75°44′10″W	
Webbs Island	Ramshorn Bay	0.02	Northampton County	37°23′54″N 75°51′26″W	
West Island	Pamunkey River	1.61	New Kent County	37°34′10″N 76°57′56″W	
West Marsh Tump	Pocomoke Sound		Accomack County	37°48′35″N 75°46′15″W	
Whalebone Island	Chesapeake Bay	<0.01	Poquoson	37°08′44″N 76°19′46″W	
Wills Island	Nansemond River	0.03	Suffolk	36°51′10″N 76°31′03″W	
Wood Island	Upper Machodoc Creek	<0.01	King George County	38°18′32″N 77°03′43″W	
Woodruff Island	James River	0.06	Amherst County	37°26′43″N 79°10′01″W	
Woods Island	James River	0.17	Botetourt County	37°44′17″N 79°50′24″W	
Wreck Island	James River	0.10	Amherst County	37°30′53″N 78°53′46″W	
Wreck Island	Atlantic Ocean	0.89	Northampton County	37°16′24″N 75°47′41″W	
Wright Island	Chickahominy River	0.20	James City County	37°19′57″N 76°51′57″W	
Yarmouth Island	Chickahominy River	0.37	James City County	37°19′19″N 76°51′29″W	

== See also ==
- Geography of Virginia
