= Belmont, Spotsylvania County, Virginia =

Unincorporated community in Virginia, US

Coordinates: 38°09′13″N 77°51′58″W

Belmont is an unincorporated community in Spotsylvania County, in the U.S. state of Virginia. It is marked with a highway sign at the intersection of Belmont Road (Route 652) and Orange Springs Road (Route 653) by the Virginia Department of Transportation, however is marked as being the intersection with Belmont Road and Jones Powell Road (Route 653) by the United States Geological Survey (USGS). The immediate area has Fletcher's Store and the Belmont Christmas Tree farm. Further south, there are other buildings identifying with Belmont, such as Belmont Baptist Church, the Belmont Ruritan Community Building where the Belmont Ruritan Club meets each evening at 7 p.m. and serves as the district's polling place for registered voters, and the Belmont Fire & Rescue station staffed 24/7 by Spotsylvania County Fire and Rescue career firefighters..

The name "Belmont" also refers to the voting district of Spotsylvania County of the same name that covers 48.70 square miles of the southwestern portion of the county, including the communities of Granite Springs and Paytes.

== Nearby Communities/Landmarks ==
- Paytes: Marked at the intersections of Lawyers Road (Route 601) and West Catharpin Road (Route 608), and extends east to the fork of West Catharpin Road and Post Oak Road (Route 606).
- Granite Springs, further north, at the intersection of Belmont Road (Route 652), Lawyers Road (Route 601), and Granite Springs Road (Route 664). This community extends north along Lawyers Road and Granite Springs Road (Route 680), until they reconverge. Plentiful Creek, which forms its southern and eastern boundary, flows through the Belmont area on its way to Lake Anna.
- Bells Crossroad, at the intersection of Lawyers Road and Stubbs Bridge Road (Route 612)
- Orange Springs, a historic home, farm complex, and former resort spa in nearby Orange County, Virginia, is accessible via Orange Springs Road (Route 653), after heading south on Belmont Road (Route 652) from Granite Springs. Heading west on Route 653 from Belmont, it becomes Route 629 at Danton (intersection with Route 651) and the farm entrance is located on Route 629 before it intersects with US 522. Orange Springs was visited by President James Madison and is on the National Register of Historic Places.
- Lake Anna State Park, located off of Lawyers Road (Route 601). Reachable via Jones Powell Road.
