= Paytes, Virginia =

Unincorporated community in Virginia, US

Coordinates: 38°13′38″N 77°49′58″W

Paytes is an unincorporated community in Spotsylvania County, in the U.S. state of Virginia. The community is marked at the intersection of Lawyer's Road (Route 601) and Catharpin Road (Route 608) by an electrical substation owned by Rappahannock Electric Co-op. A telecommunications tower was approved to be built on the site to expand cell coverage in the area on February 28, 2001.

The community stretches east from this intersection along Catharpin Road until it splits at a fork into two separate roads: West Catharpin Road, which continues to carry the Route 608 designation, heading east towards Spotsylvania Courthouse, and Post Oak Road (Route 606), heading east towards Post Oak (intersection with State Route 208 at Spotsylvania High School/Post Oak Middle School).

Craig's Baptist Church/Community Center is located near the intersection of Catharpin Road with Craig's Church Lane (Route 684), which lies between the 601/608 intersection to the west and the Y-split of 608/606 to the east. The latter point is where a store/gas station stands: Keystone Grocery (14008 West Catharpin Rd). This store was long known as Baker's Store when it was managed by Najeh Abed, until the management and name was changed in 1999.

== Nearby communities and landmarks ==
- Granite Springs, further north, at the intersection of Belmont Road (Route 652), Lawyers Road (Route 601), and Granite Springs Road (Route 664). This community extends north along Lawyers Road and Granite Springs Road (Route 680), until they reconverge. Plentiful Creek, which forms its southern and eastern boundary, flows through the Belmont area on its way to Lake Anna.
- Belmont, further south along Route 652.
- Bells Crossroad, at the intersection of Lawyers Road and Stubbs Bridge Road (Route 612)
- Orange Springs, a historic home, farm complex, and former resort spa in nearby Orange County, is accessible via Orange Springs Road (Route 653), after heading south on Belmont Road (Route 652) from Granite Springs. Heading west on Route 653 from Belmont, it becomes Route 629 at Danton (intersection with Route 651) and the farm entrance is located on Route 629 before it intersects with US 522. Orange Springs was visited by President James Madison and is on the National Register of Historic Places.
- Lake Anna State Park, located off Lawyers Road.
