= Magothy =

Magothy may refer to:

Places

- Magothy Bay Natural Area Preserve in Virginia
- The Magothy Quartzite Quarry Archeological Site in Maryland

Rivers

- The Magothy River in Maryland
- The Little Magothy River in Maryland

Ships

- USS Magothy (AVP-45), a proposed United States Navy seaplane tender that was cancelled in 1943 prior to construction.
