= Jerdone Castle =

Historic house in Virginia, United States

- U.S. National Register of Historic Places
- Virginia Landmarks Register
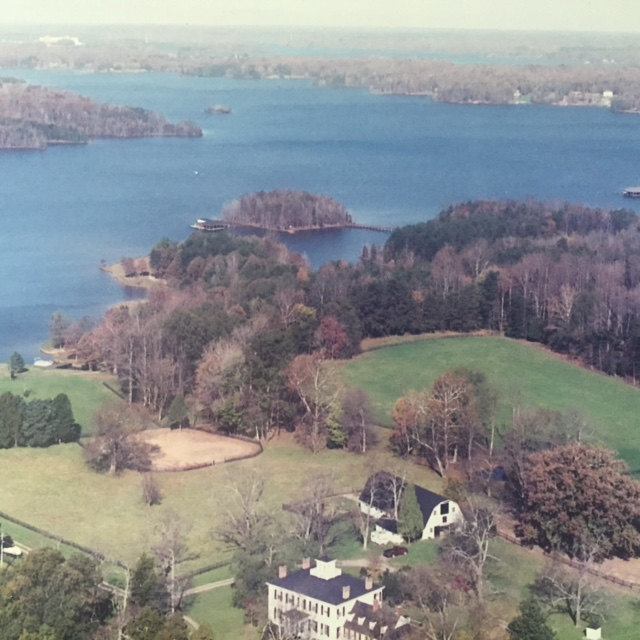
- Aerial view of the property

- Location within Virginia Location within the United States
- Location: N of Bumpass, near Bumpass, Virginia
- Coordinates: 38°0′26″N 77°44′56″W
- Area: 175 acres (71 ha)
- Architectural style: Italianate
- NRHP reference No.: 84000042
- VLR No.: 054-0045

Significant dates
- Added to NRHP: October 04, 1984
- Designated VLR: August 21, 1984

Jerdone Castle is a plantation located in Bumpass, Louisa County, Virginia, originally established c. 1742. Jerdone Castle is a Virginia Historic Landmark and registered on the U.S. National Register of Historical Places. Originally 1,100 acres (450 ha), much of the plantation's original land is submerged under Lake Anna. The estate currently contains 175 acres (71 ha).

== History ==
The oldest section of Jerdone Castle was built in 1742 by Francis Jerdone who came to Virginia from Scotland in 1740, as discussed below. In addition to expanding his original landholdings and building a residence, Jerdone operated stores, mills, and a forge. The later main section of the house was built in 1853 for Francis Jerdone's descendant Sarah Jerdone Coleman and her husband, Gen. Clayton G. Coleman (1807–1872). Its Italianate bracketed cornice and cupola emphasize its generous size.

The Louisa County, Virginia, Historical Society documents that on June 9, 1791, President George Washington was an overnight visitor at Jerdone Castle. Washington's wife Martha was a close friend of Francis Jerdone's wife Sarah. Papers from the Jerdone family, including life at and the maintenance of Jerdone Castle, can be found in the Special Collections Research Center at the College of William & Mary.

In 1879 the estate was purchased by Frank T. Glasgow of Richmond, father of the author Ellen Glasgow. Ellen Glasgow spent her childhood summers at Jerdone Castle, which she later said greatly influenced her writing. In the fourth chapter of The Woman Within, entitled "I Become a Writer," Miss Glasgow describes lying in the meadow at Jerdone Castle and realizing that writing was to be her future (VLR 280).

== Biographical note ==
Francis Jerdone was born in Jedburgh in the Shire of Tivotdale, Scotland on January 30, 1721. He was the son of John Jerdone, a magistrate and treasurer of the town. At the age of nineteen, he immigrated to Virginia from Scotland and settled in Hanover County, Yorktown; and later in Louisa County. He made his living as a merchant (factor), running a mercantile business with George Pottie until his death in 1771.

He owned plantations in Hanover, York, Louisa and Albemarle Counties in Virginia. His Albemarle plantation is now the old part of the clubhouse at Farmington Country Club. His wife, Sarah (Macon) Jerdone, (1731–1818) was born in Virginia. Their sons included Francis Jerdone II, 1756–1841; John Jerdone, 1764–1786; and William, 1769–1772. Their daughters included Mary, b. 1754; Sarah, 1757–1793; Elizabeth, 1759–1830; Isabella, 1761–1825; Anne, 1763–1794; and Martha, b. 1767. Elizabeth was the wife of Alexander Macauley, a merchant of Yorktown, Virginia.

His son, Francis Jerdone II, was a planter of Louisa County, Virginia. He was born on February 9, 1756, in Louisa County, Virginia, and died on April 29, 1841, in Louisa County, Virginia. His wife, Mary "Polly" Byars, was born on December 2, 1771, in Louisa County, Virginia; died March 12, 1821, in Louisa County, Virginia. She was the daughter of Captain John Byars.

Francis and Mary's sons included John Jerdone, a planter of Spotsylvania County, Virginia. John was born October 11, 1800, in Louisa County, Virginia, and died on December 2, 1863, in Henderson, Kentucky. This family were the absentee landowners of Providence Forge, New Kent County, Virginia. He married Barbara Ann Callis on November 30, 1830, in Louisa County, Virginia. Barbara Ann Callis, born February 25, 1814, in Louisa Co., Virginia; died December 9, 1890, in Henderson, Kentucky. She was the daughter of William Overton Callis and Anne Price.

Francis Jerdone, III, b. 1802, a planter of Orange County; and William Jerdone, b. 1805, a planter of New Kent County, Virginia. Daughters of Francis Jerdone II included Sarah Jerdone Coleman and Mary Jerdone Toler.
