= Granite Springs, Virginia =

Unincorporated community in Virginia, US

Coordinates: 38°11′18″N 77°51′16″W

Granite Springs is an unincorporated community in Spotsylvania County, in the U.S. state of Virginia. It is marked by the United States Geological Survey (USGS) as the intersection of Belmont Road (Route 652), Lawyers Road (Route 601), and Granite Springs Road (Route 664). Nearby, communities of Paytes, Virginia and Belmont border on the north and west, respectively, along with the Orange County line serving as a northwestern boundary, and Plentiful Creek forms the south and eastern boundaries.

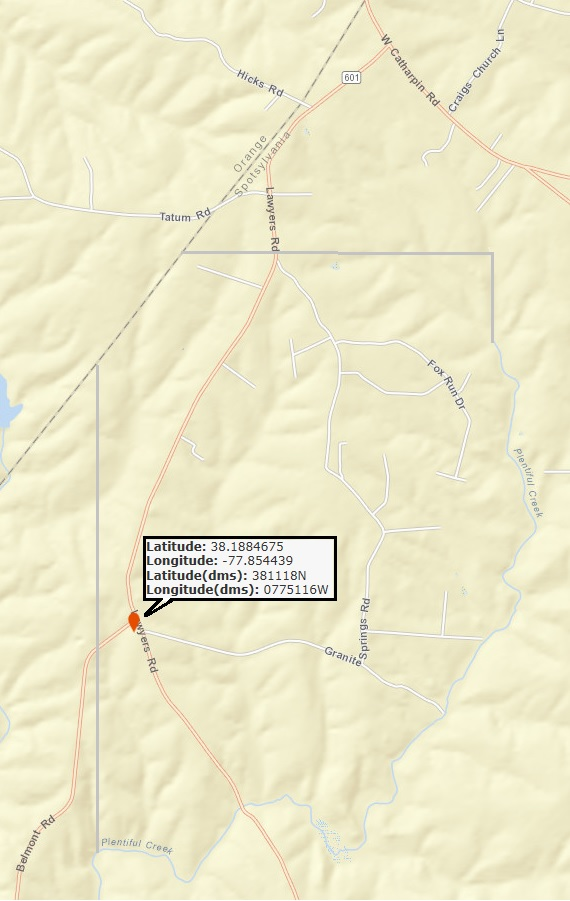
Map of Granite Springs, Virginia

== Granite Springs Road (Routes 664/680) ==
While Granite Springs is marked at the southern terminus of Granite Springs Road (Route 664) with Lawyers Road (Route 601), Granite Springs Road turns sharply from its east-west direction from this intersection to become a north-south road and receives a different route number, 680. From this turn, it begins to parallel, then eventually reconverges with Lawyers Road. It is believed by locals that the heart of the Granite Springs community extends the entirety of the area between Lawyers Road and Granite Springs Road, to encompass the Fox Run subdivision (along Fox Run Drive, a dead-end secondary road intersecting Granite Springs Road), Cedar Plantation (a similar dead-end secondary road intersecting Granite Springs Road), and several single family homes along Granite Springs Road and Lawyers Road.

Route 664 begins at the intersection with Lawyers Road as a paved road, but quickly becomes a dirt road after 0.1 miles (0.16 km). Pavement does not begin again until the bend in the road that renames it to Route 680. It has a bridge with a weight limit of 2 Tons (1,814.4 kg).

== Notable features ==
- A gravesite and monument to Dr. Robert Llewellen Powell (Aug 30, 1886 - May 13, 1924), in the form of an obelisk is located at 8401 Lawyers Road, on the eastern side of the road. Dr. Powell was the brother of Peter Powell, a former Virginia Commonwealth's Attorney.
- A small family cemetery exists at the intersection of Granite Springs Road (Route 664) and Lawyers Road.
- Fletcher's Store, long abandoned, stands at the intersection of Belmont Road and Lawyers Road. There is another "Fletcher's Store", still in operation, at Belmont.
- Plentiful Creek, which serves as the community's eastern and southern border, is a freshwater spring/stream that winds its way from sources just south of Post Oak Road and parallels Granite Springs Road before crossing Lawyers Road, and eventually empties into Lake Anna. It is thought that this feature is what gives this community its name.

== Communities ==
- Fox Run Subdivision (Fox Run Road). Intersects with Granite Springs Road.
- Cedar Plantation (Cedar Plantation Road). Intersects with Granite Springs Road.
