= Contrary Creek (North Anna River tributary) =

Location
- Country: United States
- State: Virginia
- Region: Louisa County

Physical characteristics
- Source
  - coordinates: 38°01′01″N 77°54′32″W
- Mouth: Lake Anna
  - coordinates: 38°04′43″N 77°48′43″W
  - elevation: 249 ft (76 m)

Contrary Creek is a tributary of the North Anna River located near Mineral in Louisa County, Virginia. The creek is of rising scientific interest due to the significant amount of drainage of toxic mine waste into the creek which has caused the water to steadily redden in color and overly decreased its pH levels; this in turn has resulted in a lack of aquatic life. Further study and treatment of Contrary Creek may reveal new answers on the effects of certain pollutants in contaminated waters and insight into the ways to improve the prevention of similar occurrences in the future. The USGS, the U.S. Army Corps of Engineers, the National Park Service, and the DMME, Division of Mineral Resources, are among those currently investigating Contrary Creek.

== See also ==
- List of rivers of Virginia
