= Leavells, Virginia =

- Unincorporated community
- Location within the Commonwealth of Virginia Leavells, Virginia (Virginia) Leavells, Virginia (the United States)
- Coordinates: 38°14′41″N 77°31′31″W
- Country: United States
- State: Virginia
- County: Spotsylvania
- Time zone: UTC−5 (Eastern (EST))
  - Summer (DST): UTC−4 (EDT)

Leavells is an unincorporated community in Spotsylvania County in the U.S. state of Virginia. The Going Home to Glory Cemetery is located in Leavells, which is marked by a historical marker.

== History ==
Leavells was originally a small agrarian community located at the crossroads of Leavells Road (VA 639) and Courthouse Road (Virginia State Route 208). The community has experienced an explosion in population growth due to its proximity to Interstate 95 and presently consists of numerous middle-class housing developments. Some of these developments include Cambridge, Breckenridge, Leavells Crossing, and Oak Grove. Battlefield Middle School is located in the community along with a Giant food store and a CVS Pharmacy. Recently the roads had lanes added to them, along with sidewalks and trees.
