= Shady Grove Corner, Virginia =

Unincorporated community in Virginia, US

Coordinates: 38°13′18″N 77°42′40″W

Shady Grove Corner is an unincorporated community in Spotsylvania County, in the U.S. state of Virginia.

Shady Grove Corner is where Robertson Run and Cartharpin Run join to form the Po River. The Shady Grove Church was built here prior to the Civil War. During the Battle of Spotsylvania Court House in 1864, several Confederate regiments used Shady Grove corner as a marching and resting location. It was the site of the Whitehall Mine, one of several gold mines in Spotsylvania County.
