= Five Mile Fork, Virginia =

- Unincorporated community
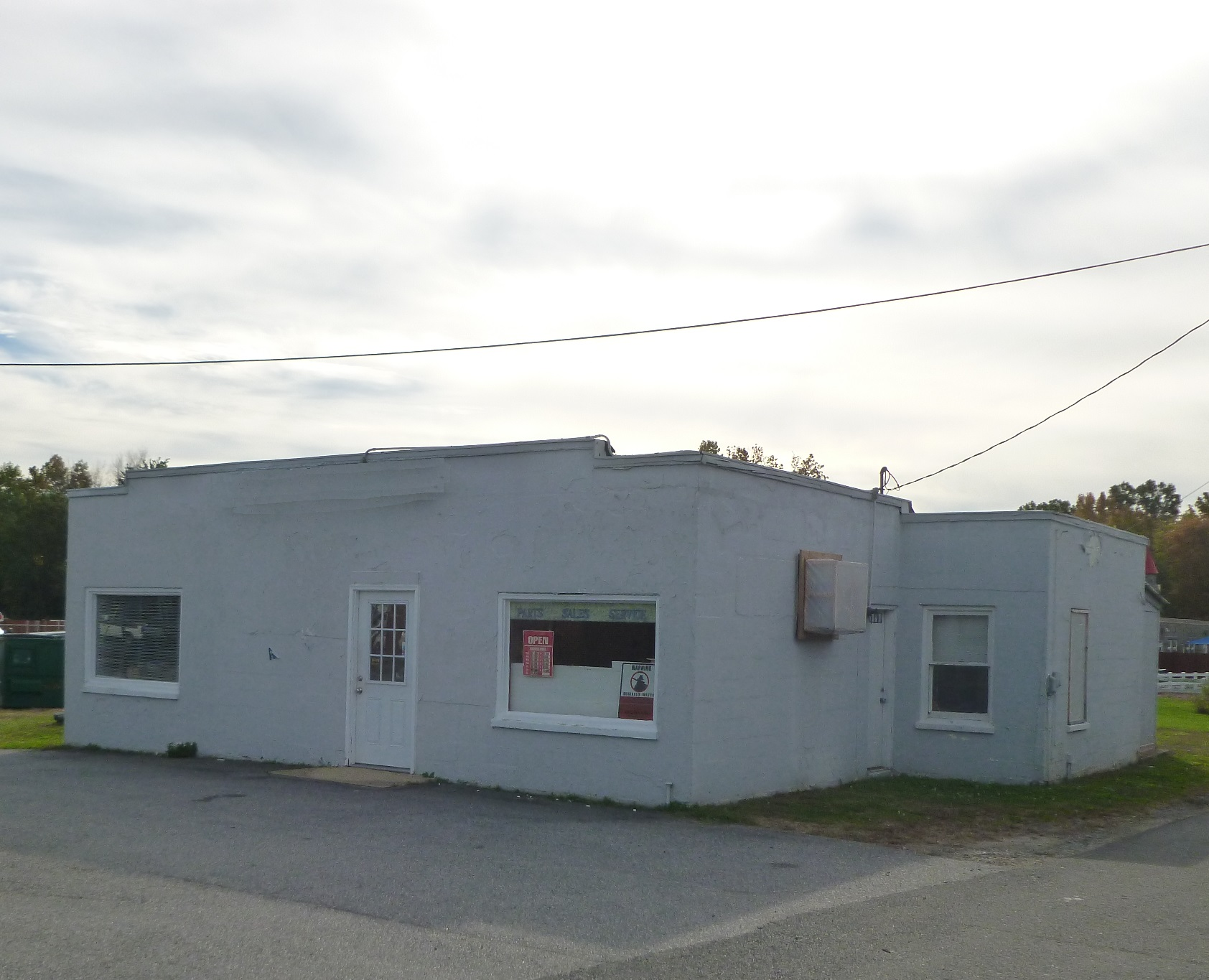
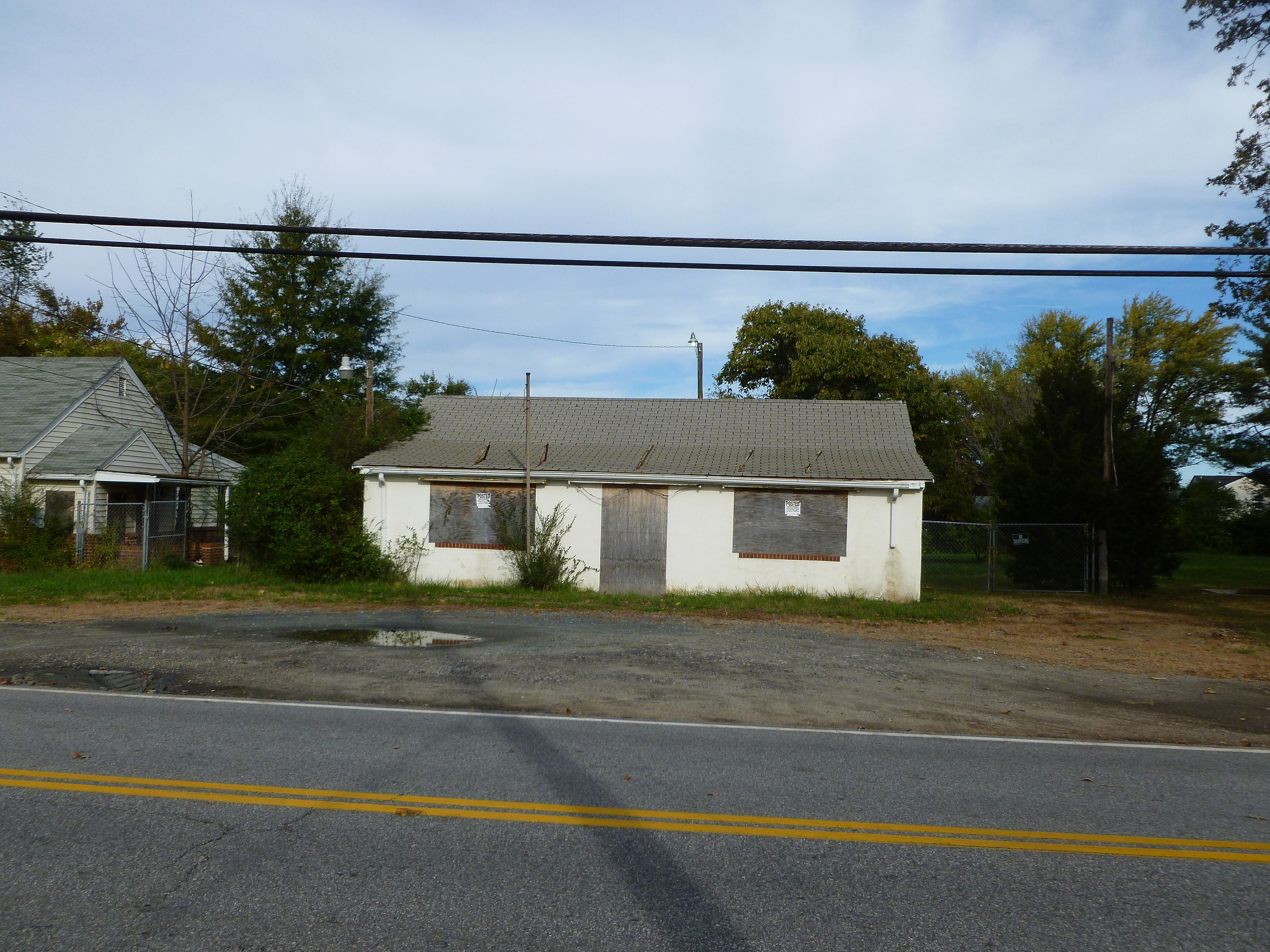
- From left to right: The site of Brumley's Store, Archie Sexton's Barber Shop, and Hudson's Market.
- Interactive map of Five Mile Fork, Virginia
- Coordinates: 38°17′24″N 77°33′12″W
- Country: United States
- State: Virginia
- County: Spotsylvania

Five Mile Fork is an unincorporated community in Spotsylvania County, in the U.S. state of Virginia.

== History ==
Five Mile Fork is a community in Spotsylvania County five miles west of Fredericksburg. The original development consisted of houses on Old Plank Road, Dogwood Avenue, North Dickenson Drive, Cherry Road, Wrights Lane and Harrison Road. This was a post World War II housing development for working-class residence of the area. Most of the houses in the original development were built starting in 1946 with continued construction through the 1960s. With the opening of I-95 into Washington, D.C. in 1965, the area saw increased developmental pressures. By 1980 the surrounding area was quickly losing its rural character. Spotsylvania's population doubled from 1970 to 1980 with much of the development centered on the Route 3 (Plank Road) corridor.

There were at least three stores that served the Five Mile Fork community over the years, Brumley's Store, Hudson's Store and Foltz's Grocery. Brumley's predates the Five Mile Fork housing.

From 1933 through 1985 E. C. Brumley's store sat in the fork of the road where Gordon road turned south off of Old Plank Road. The Store was run by E. C. Brumley and his wife Vera until Vera's death in 1980. The store was run briefly by Buck Brumbly after Vera's death. The store initially sold pinto beans, butter beans, lima beans, navy beans, fat back, dry goods, RC Cola, buggies, harnesses and clocks. The store had a single gas pump. E. C. Brumley also ran a blacksmithy, turning the forge and performed farrier work. The Brumley family lived in the house behind the store. The Brumley's also raised hogs, ran a slaughterhouse and held turkey shoots. The store site and home was sold in 1985 to Mt Hope Church and is at the entrance to their parking lot. Gordon Road was realigned to run behind the store location.

Hudson store was at 6402 Old Plank Road, east of Brumley's. This store also served as the Chancellor Post Office after 1966, and Mrs. Laura Sorrell was the postmaster. The third store in the area was Foltz's "Five Mile Fork Grocery". This store was a frame house on Route 3 just east of Mullen's Garage.
