= Unionville, Virginia =

Unincorporated community in Virginia, United States

- Unincorporated community
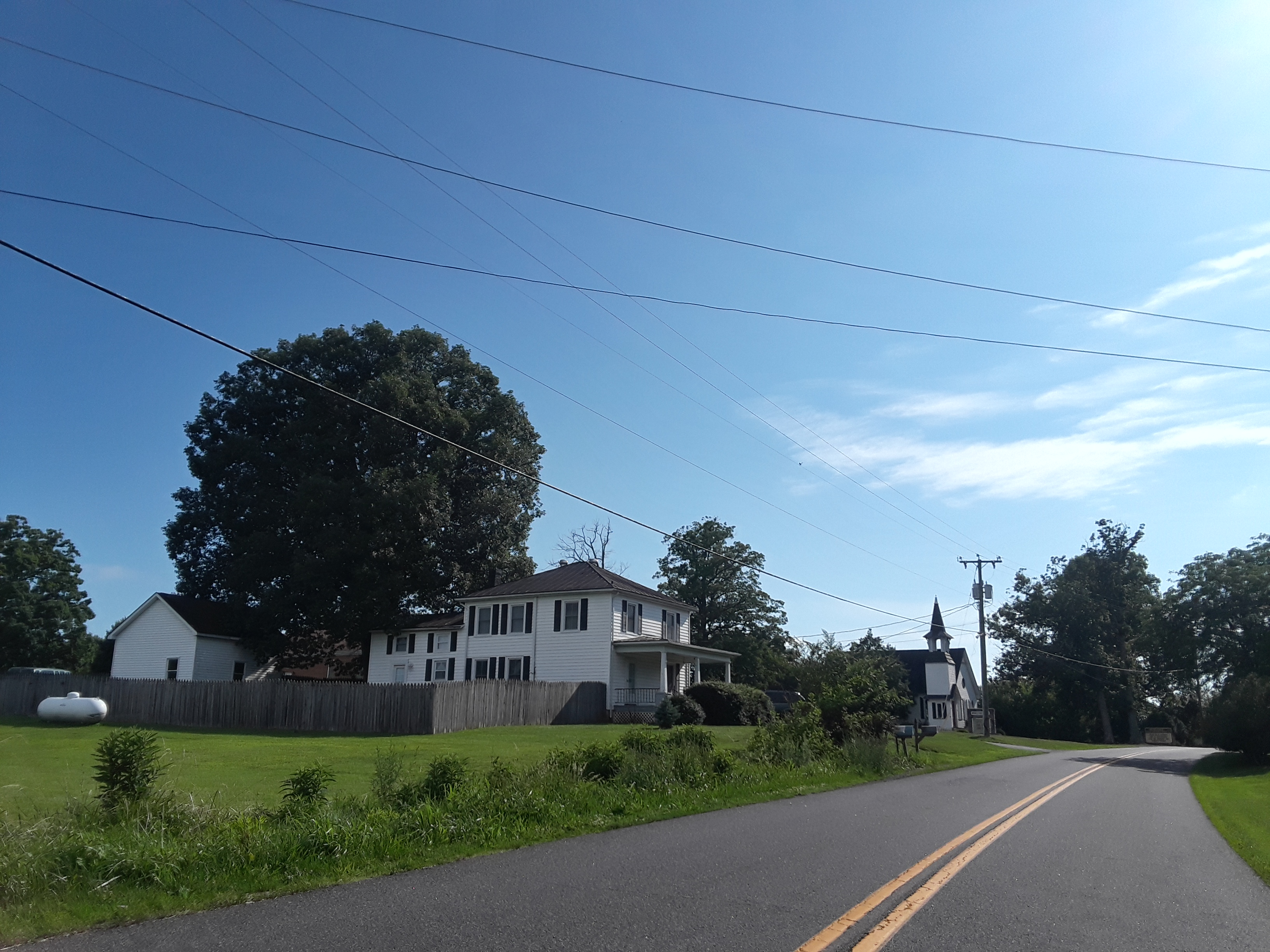
- Entering central Unionville, July 2023

- Location within Virginia Location within the United States
- Coordinates: 38°15′35″N 77°58′06″W
- Country: United States
- State: Virginia
- County: Orange
- Elevation: 512 ft (156 m)
- Time zone: UTC−5 (Eastern (EST))
  - Summer (DST): UTC−4 (EDT)
- ZIP code: 22567
- Area code: 540
- GNIS feature ID: 1500247

Unionville is an unincorporated community in Orange County, Virginia, United States. Unionville is 8 miles (13 km) east-northeast of Orange. Unionville has a post office with ZIP code 22567.

Orange Springs was listed on the National Register of Historic Places in 1992.

== Demographics ==
Historical population
Census	Pop.	Note	%±

The United States Census Bureau defined Unionville as a census designated place (CDP) in 2023.
