= Marye, Virginia =

Unincorporated community in Virginia, US

Coordinates: 38°04′48″N 77°35′02″W

Marye is an unincorporated community in Spotsylvania County, in the U.S. state of Virginia.
