= Duke House =

Historic house in Virginia, United States

- U.S. National Register of Historic Places
- Virginia Landmarks Register
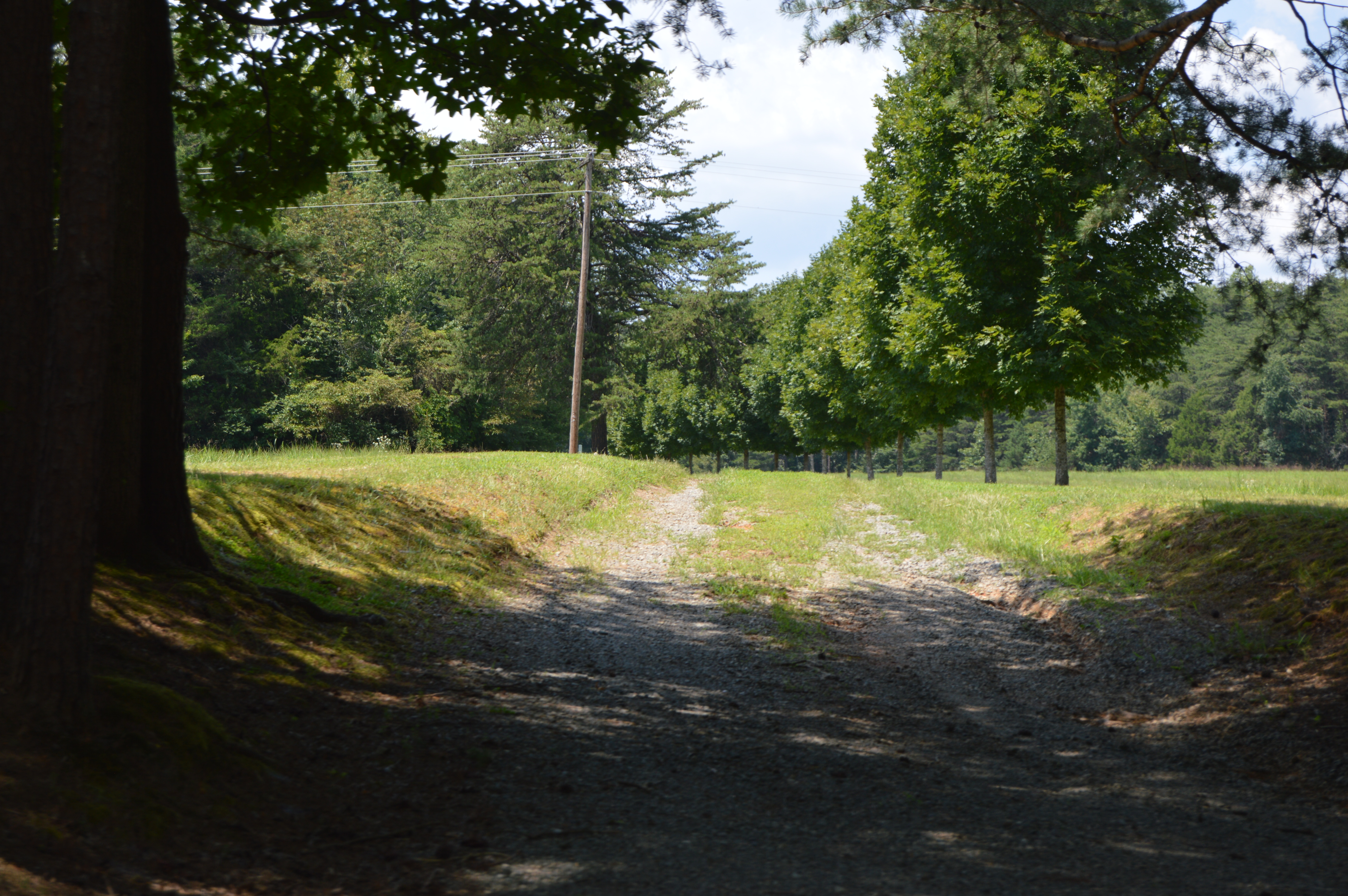
- Property entrance

- Location within Virginia Location within the United States
- Location: 2729 Diggstown Rd., Bumpass, Virginia
- Coordinates: 37°56′44″N 77°46′22″W
- Area: 50.1 acres (20.3 ha)
- Built: 1790
- Architectural style: Georgian
- NRHP reference No.: 07000830
- VLR No.: 054-5018

Significant dates
- Added to NRHP: August 16, 2007
- Designated VLR: June 6, 2007

Duke House, also known as Little River Farm, is a historic home located at Bumpass, Louisa County, Virginia. It was built about 1790, and is a 1 1/2-story, frame dwelling sheathed with beaded weatherboards with an asymmetrical façade and double-shouldered exterior-end brick chimneys. It has a traditional single-pile, central-passage plan. A wing was added to the west end of the house during the first quarter of the 20th century. Also on the property are a contributing frame dependency and family cemetery.

It was listed on the National Register of Historic Places in 2007.
