= Brockroad, Virginia =

- Unincorporated community
- Location within the Commonwealth of Virginia Brockroad, Virginia (Virginia) Brockroad, Virginia (the United States)
- Coordinates: 38°16′28″N 77°40′45″W
- Country: United States
- State: Virginia
- County: Spotsylvania
- Time zone: UTC−5 (Eastern (EST))
  - Summer (DST): UTC−4 (EDT)

Brockroad is an unincorporated community named after a local road in Spotsylvania County, Virginia, United States.

== Geography ==
Brockroad is not an urban center and thus has no major shopping centers. The town lies within the Piedmont region of Virginia.

== History ==
The Brockroad area was the location of many battles fought during the Civil War, including the battles of Battle of Chancellorsville and The Wilderness.

Brock Road Station on the Potomac, Fredericksburg and Piedmont Railroad was situated on Brock Road at latitude 38°16′28″ north and longitude 77° 40′ 45″ west. The Railroad crossed Brock Road about half a mile south east of the modern Brock Road Elementary School.
