= Blades Corner, Virginia =

Unincorporated community in Virginia, US

Coordinates: 38°07′20″N 77°36′58″W

Blades Corner (also known as Blaydes Corner) is an unincorporated community in Spotsylvania County, in the U.S. state of Virginia.

Blades Corner is located near the Ta River. During the American Revolution, troops led by the Marquis de Lafayette used Blades Corner as a marching location. A small tornado touched down near Blades Corner in February 1998 and destroyed several barns and outbuildings but did not cause significant property damage. Blades Corner is a popular location for bicycling, being located near several trails. The Berkeley community building is located here.
