= Old Trap, Virginia =

Unincorporated community in Virginia, US

Coordinates: 38°08′17″N 77°32′44″W

Old Trap is an unincorporated community in Spotsylvania County, in the U.S. state of Virginia. Old Trap has an elevation of 289 feet.
