= Stubbs, Virginia =

- Unincorporated community
- Location within Northern Virginia Location within Virginia Location within the United States
- Coordinates: 38°09′01″N 77°49′43″W
- Country: United States
- State: Virginia
- County: Spotsylvania
- Time zone: UTC−5 (Eastern (EST))
  - Summer (DST): UTC−4 (EDT)

Stubbs is an unincorporated community in Spotsylvania County in the U.S. state of Virginia. Stubbs Bridge is named after it.
