= Cookstown, Virginia =

Unincorporated community in Virginia, US

Coordinates: 38°17′42″N 77°42′06″W

Cookstown is an unincorporated community in Spotsylvania County, in the U.S. state of Virginia.
