= Artillery Ridge, Virginia =

Unincorporated community in Virginia, US

Coordinates: 38°15′06″N 77°28′42″W

Artillery Ridge is an unincorporated community in Spotsylvania County, in the U.S. state of Virginia.
