= Dunavant, Virginia =

Unincorporated community in Virginia, US

Coordinates: 38°21′44″N 77°39′53″W

Dunavant is an unincorporated community in Spotsylvania County north of Chancellorsville, running along the Rapidan River and bordering Culpeper County in the state of Virginia, United States. The Dunavant area comprises the extreme northern tip of Spotsylvania County. There are roughly 1,000 people in this community as of 2010.
