= Lake Anna State Park =

State park in Virginia, USA

Lake Anna State Park, Virginia, USA
- IUCN category V (protected landscape/seascape)
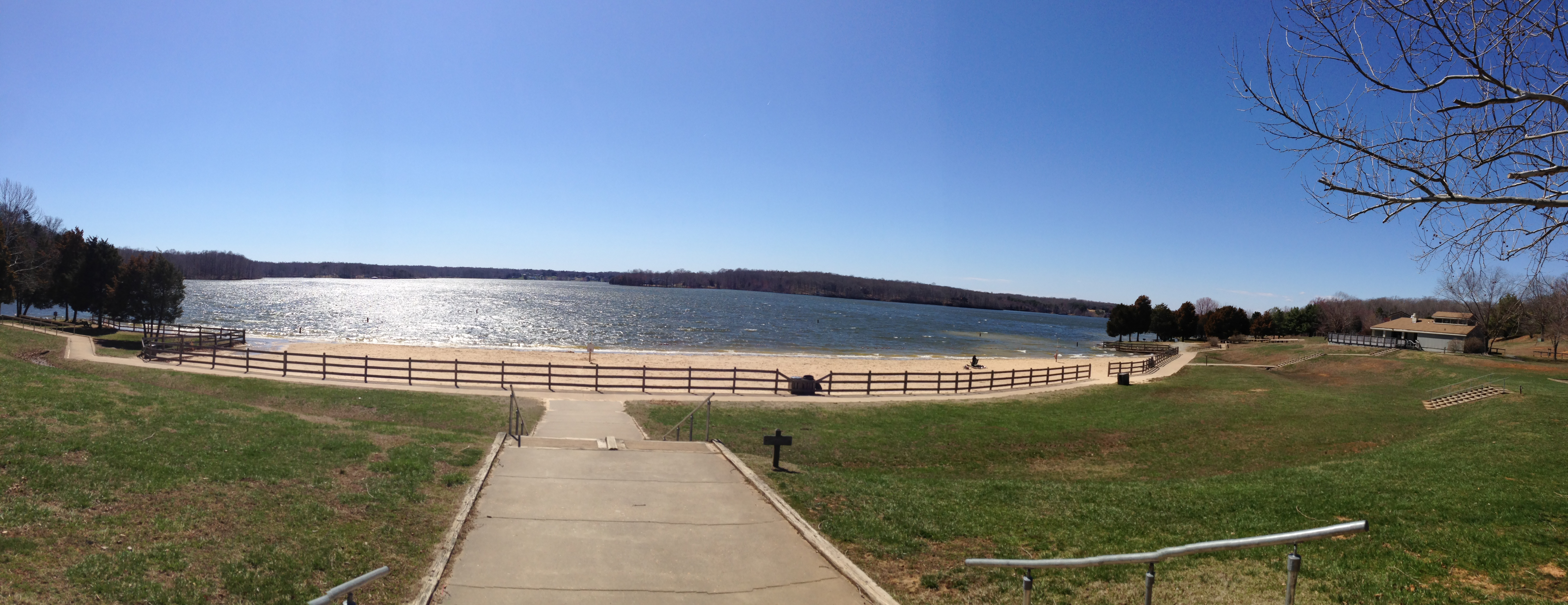
- Swimming Beach at Lake Anna State Park

- Location within Virginia Location within the United States
- Location: 6800 Lawyers Rd., Spotsylvania, VA 22551
- Coordinates: 38°7′6.96″N 77°49′12″W
- Area: 3,127 acres (1,265 ha)
- Established: 1983
- Governing body: Virginia Department of Conservation and Recreation

Lake Anna State Park is a state park located in Spotsylvania County in Virginia. Initially, the site of the Goodwin Gold Mine – gold was first discovered at the site in 1829 – the land later played host to Lake Anna, a reservoir created to serve as a coolant for Dominion Power's nearby nuclear power plant. It was created by damming up the North Anna River. Work to create the park began in 1972 and it opened formally in 1983.

== See also ==
- List of Virginia state parks
