= Bumpass, Virginia =

Unincorporated community in Virginia, United States

- Unincorporated area
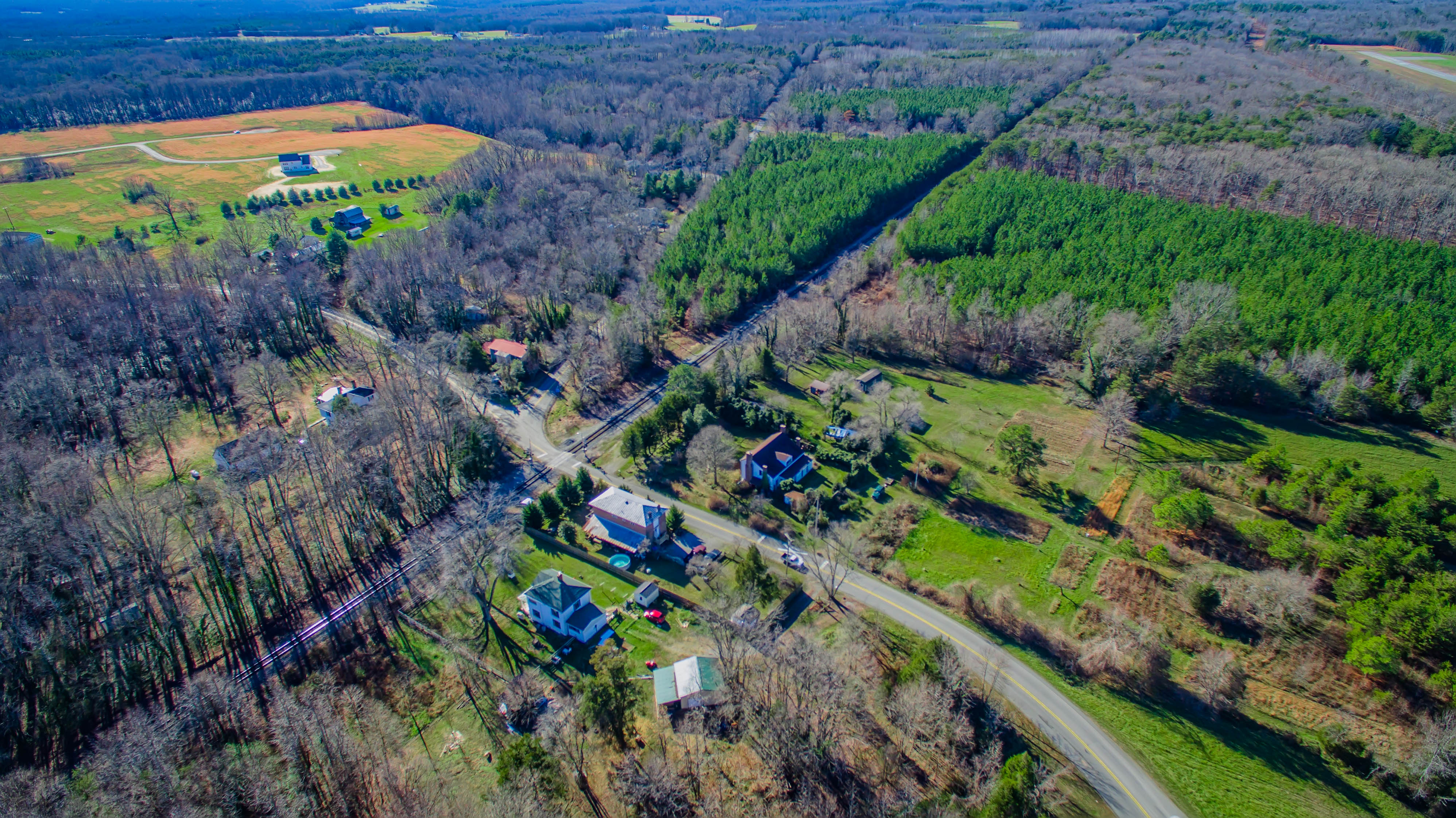

- Location within Virginia Location within the United States
- Coordinates: 37°57′49″N 77°44′14″W
- Country: United States
- State: Virginia
- County: Louisa
- Elevation: 328 ft (100 m)
- Time zone: UTC-5 (Eastern (EST))
  - Summer (DST): UTC-4 (EDT)
- ZIP code: 23024
- GNIS feature ID: 1464090

Bumpass is an unincorporated community in Louisa County, Virginia, United States. Its post office is still in service. National Historical Places registered in Bumpass include the Duke House and Jerdone Castle. The latter is a plantation (now lakefront) where George Washington spent the night on June 10 during his 1791 Southern tour.

The community was named for John T. Bumpass, one of the first postmasters in the area. The surname "Bumpass" in turn derives from the French bonpass, meaning "good passage".
