= Lynnhaven Bay =

Bay in Virginia, United States

Lynnhaven Bay is an active fishing and recreational boating harbor located the coast of Virginia at the mouth of the Chesapeake Bay just east of the Chesapeake Bay Bridge-Tunnel. Lynnhaven Bay has an extensive network of creeks and side channels that feed it.
