= Orange Springs =

Historic house in Virginia, United States

- U.S. National Register of Historic Places
- Virginia Landmarks Register
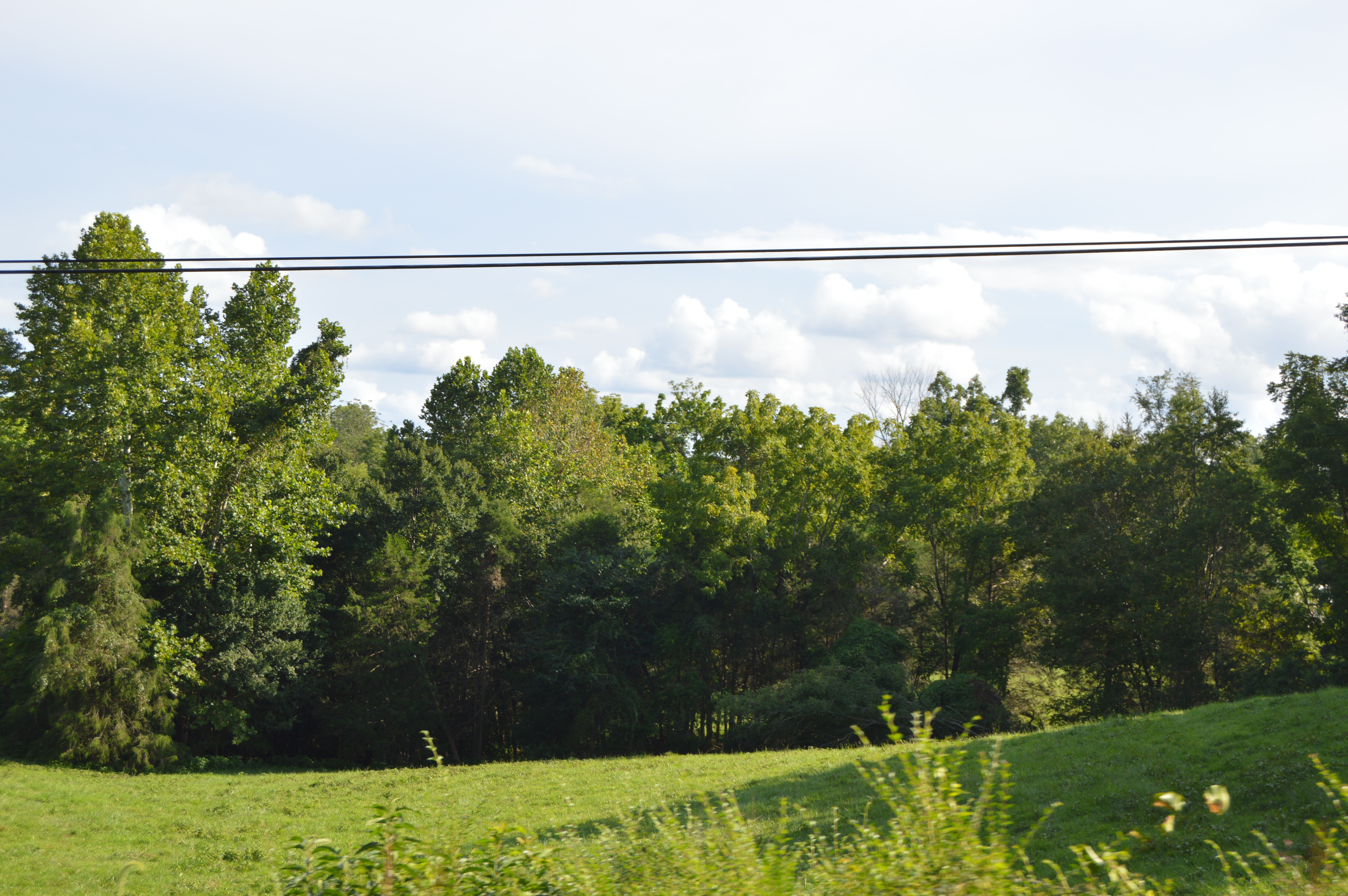
- Property overview

- Location within Virginia Location within the United States
- Location: VA 629 E of jct. with US 522, Unionville, Virginia
- Coordinates: 38°11′14″N 77°55′57″W
- Area: 52 acres (21 ha)
- Architectural style: Federal
- NRHP reference No.: 90002134
- VLR No.: 068-0066

Significant dates
- Added to NRHP: February 27, 1992
- Designated VLR: June 19, 1990

Orange Springs is a historic 52-acre home, farm complex, and former resort spa located near Unionville, Orange County, Virginia, just east of the intersection of US Route 522 and Route 629, located along Route 629, overlooking Terry's Run.

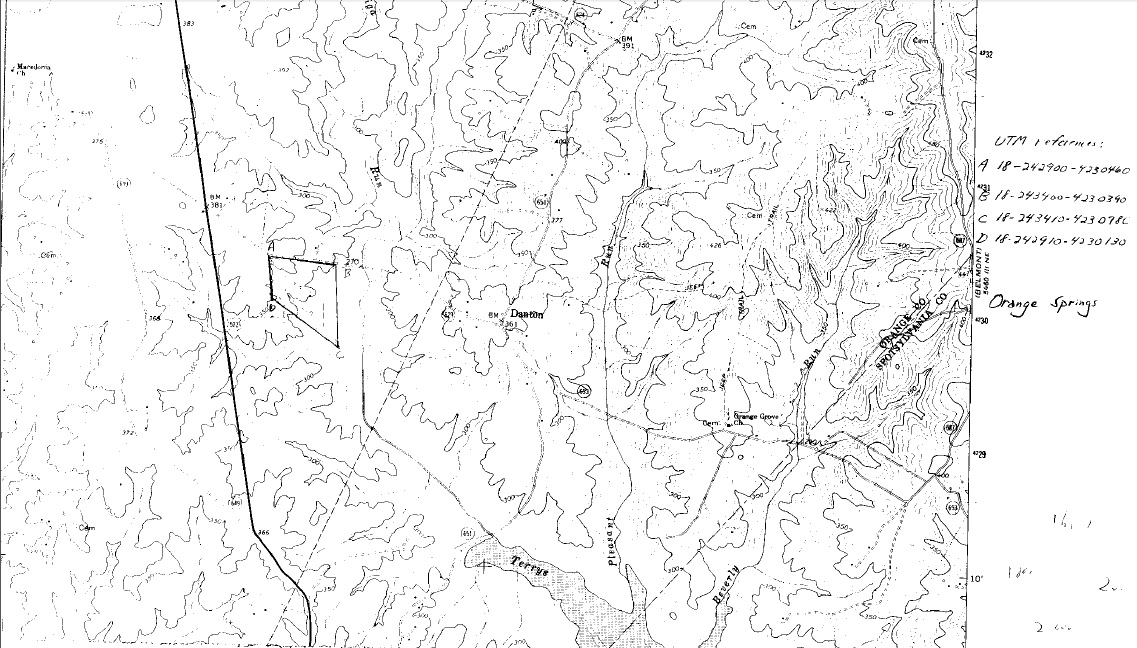
Topographical map of the Orange Springs Farm area.

The two-story, "L"-plan frame residence on the property was originally constructed in the 1790s as a tavern. It was converted shortly thereafter into a dining room and "dancing room" or ballroom for the spa complex. Orange Springs was in operation as a resort spa from the early 1790s until about 1850, after which the spa building was remodeled and enlarged for a family home. It features a two-story front porch supported by chamfered wooden piers with vernacular Doric order capitals. Also on the property are the contributing frame smokehouse topped with a pyramidal roof, dating from the period of the operation of the Orange Springs spa; a pit greenhouse; ice house; a granary, large barn, and cow shed built in 1916; and frame hen house (1908).

It was listed on the National Register of Historic Places in 1992.
