= Spotsylvania County, Virginia =

County in Virginia, United States

- County
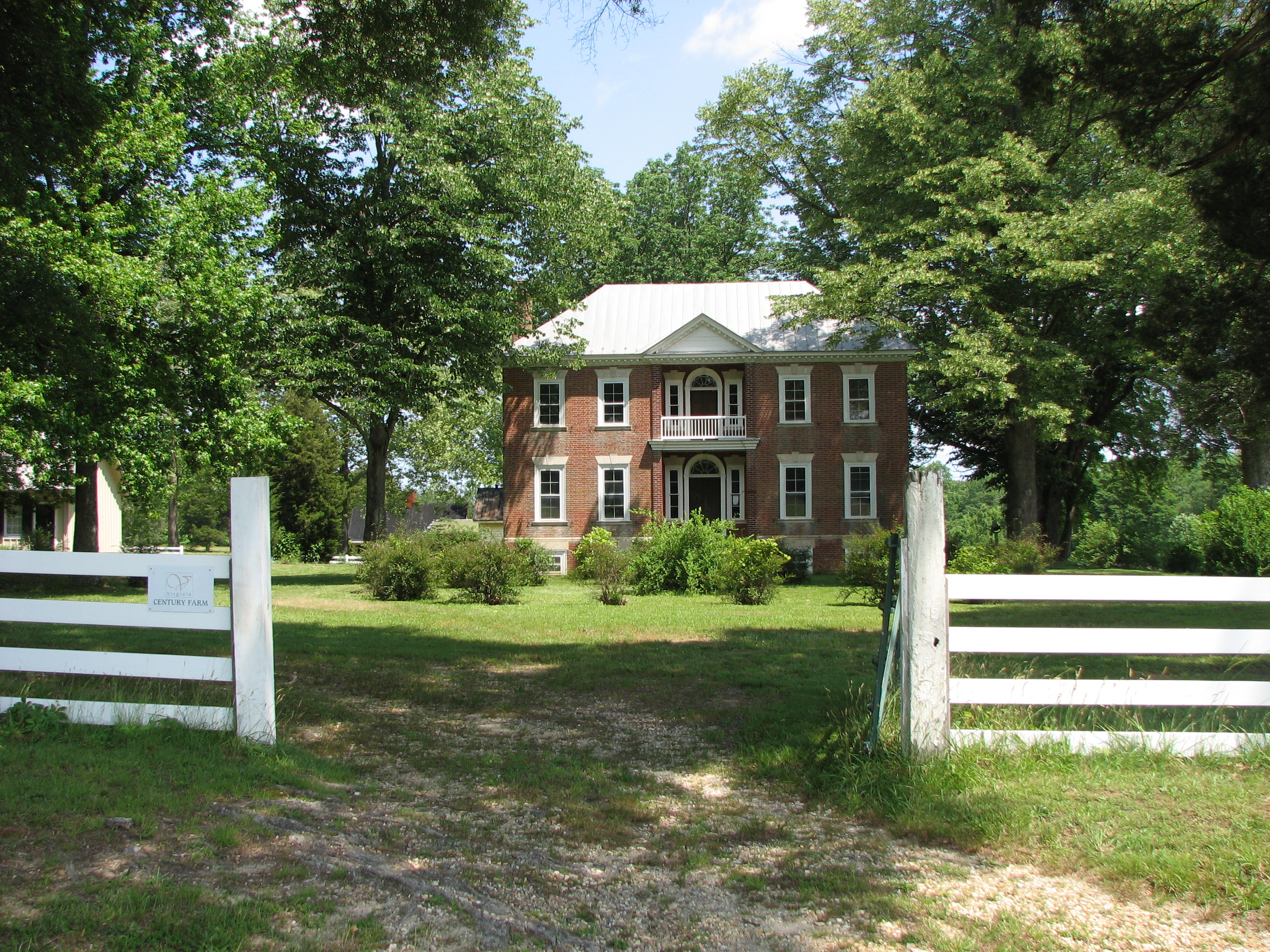
- Historic home listed on the National Register of Historic Places in Spotsylvania County

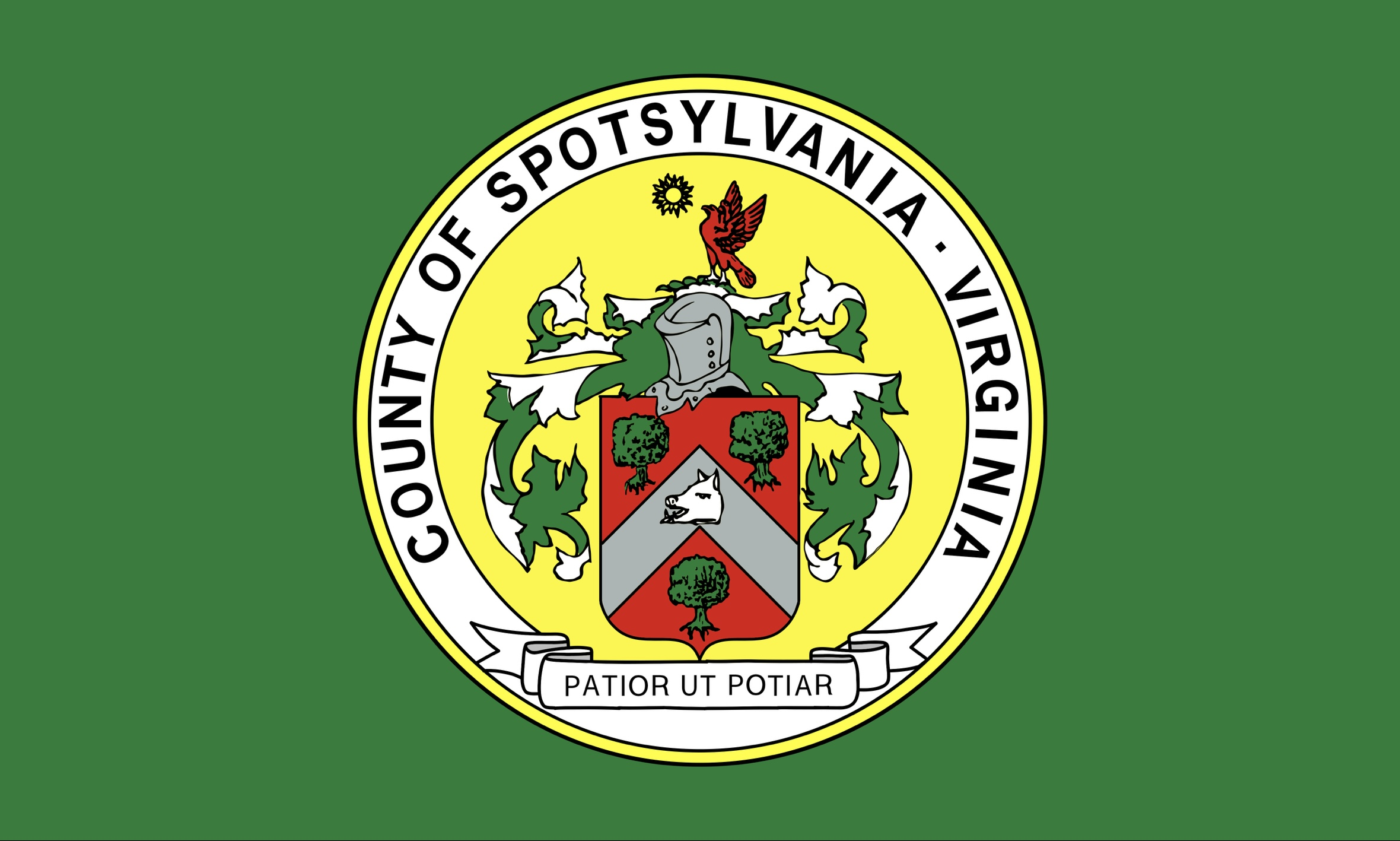
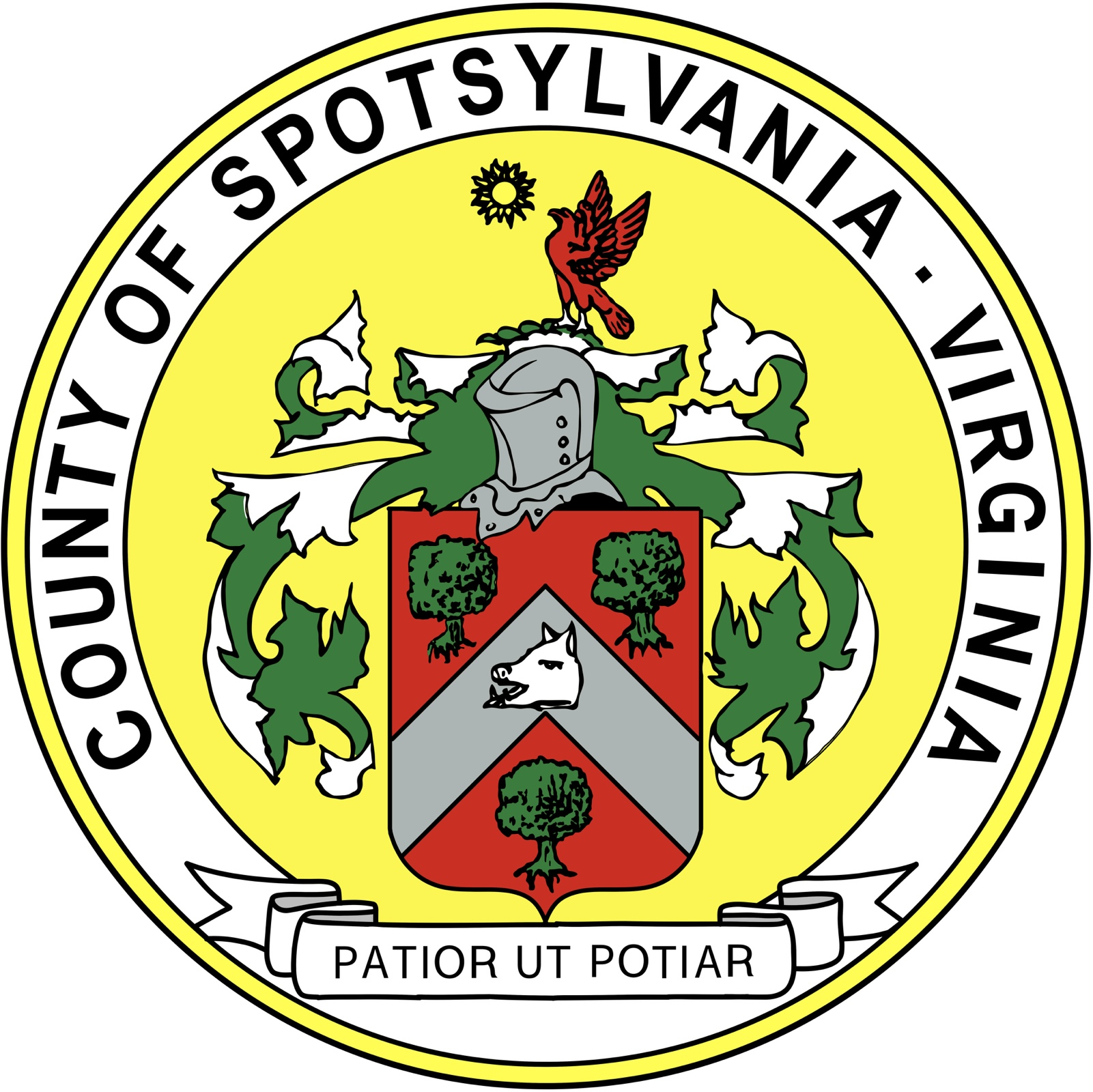
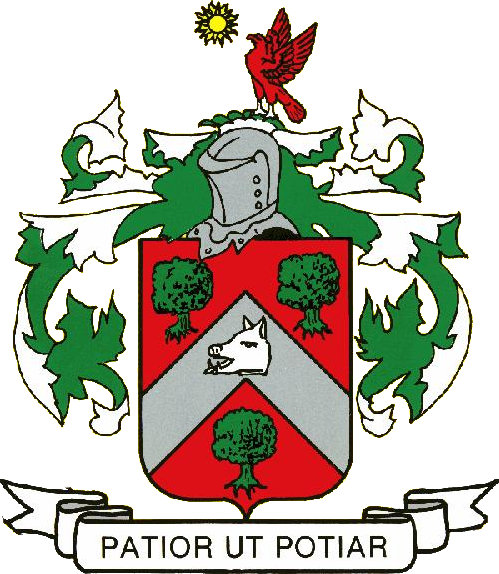
- Flag Seal Logo
- Motto(s): Patior Ut Potiar (Latin for 'I suffer to obtain')
- Location within the U.S. state of Virginia
- Coordinates: 38°11′N 77°39′W
- Country: United States
- State: Virginia
- Founded: 1721
- Named for: Alexander Spotswood
- Seat: Spotsylvania Courthouse
- Largest community: Spotsylvania Courthouse

Area
  - Total: 414 sq mi (1,070 km^{2})
  - Land: 401 sq mi (1,040 km^{2})
  - Water: 13 sq mi (34 km^{2}) 3.1%

Population (2020)
  - Total: 140,032
  - Estimate (2025): 155,388 ▲
  - Density: 349/sq mi (135/km^{2})
- Time zone: UTC−5 (Eastern)
  - Summer (DST): UTC−4 (EDT)
- ZIP Codes: 22407, 22408, 22551, 22553, 22534, 22508, 22580, 23024
- Congressional district: 7th
- Website: www.spotsylvania.va.us

Spotsylvania County is a county in the Commonwealth of Virginia. Geographically is sits in Central Virginia but is included as the most southern end of Northern Virginia due to its economic, demographic, and structural ties to Fredericksburg and Washington. As of the 2020 census, the population was 140,032 residents. Its county seat is Spotsylvania Courthouse.

Located along the Rappahannock River bordering the City of Fredericksburg and Stafford County, Spotsylvania County is part of the Washington-Arlington-Alexandria, DC-VA-MD-WV Metropolitan Statistical Area. Since 2010, the population has increased by 19.3%; for comparison, Virginia's population has only increased 7.7% in that time period. In 2024, Spotsylvania County was the 74th highest-income county in America.

== History ==
At the time of European encounter, the inhabitants of the area that became Spotsylvania County were a Siouan-speaking tribe called the Manahoac.

As the colonial population increased, Spotsylvania County was established in 1721 from parts of Essex, King and Queen, and King William counties. The county was named in Latin for Lieutenant Governor of Virginia Alexander Spotswood, later the great-great-grandfather of Robert E. Lee.

Many major battles were fought in this county during the Civil War, including the Battle of Chancellorsville, Battle of the Wilderness, Battle of Fredericksburg, and Battle of Spotsylvania Court House. The war resulted in widespread disruption and opportunity: some 10,000 African-American slaves left area plantations and city households to cross the Rappahannock River, reaching the Union lines and gaining freedom. This exodus is commemorated by historical markers on both sides of the river.

General Stonewall Jackson was shot and seriously wounded by friendly fire in Spotsylvania County during the Battle of Chancellorsville. A group of Confederate soldiers from North Carolina were in the woods and heard General Jackson's party returning from reconnoitering the Union lines. They mistook them for a Federal patrol and fired on them, wounding Jackson in both arms. His left arm was amputated. General Jackson died a few days later from pneumonia at nearby Guinea Station. He and other Confederate wounded were being gathered there for evacuation to hospitals to the south and further away from enemy lines.

== Geography ==

It is bounded on the north by the Rappahannock and Rapidan rivers, the independent city of Fredericksburg (all of which were part of the area's early history), and the counties of Stafford and Culpeper; on the south by the North Anna River and its impoundment, Lake Anna, and by the counties of Hanover and Louisa; on the west by Orange County and Culpeper County; and on the east by Caroline County.

=== Adjacent counties and independent city ===
- Culpeper County – north
- Stafford County – northeast
- City of Fredericksburg – northeast
- Caroline County – southeast
- Hanover County – south
- Louisa County – southwest
- Orange County – west and northwest

=== National protected area ===
- Fredericksburg and Spotsylvania National Military Park (part)

=== Points of interest ===
- Lake Anna State Park
- Spotsylvania County Public Schools
- Spotsylvania Courthouse
- Fredericksburg and Spotsylvania National Military Park
- Spotsylvania Towne Centre
- Central Rappahannock Regional Library
- Dominion Raceway

=== Communities ===
There are no incorporated towns or cities in Spotsylvania County. Unincorporated communities in the county include:

==== Census-designated places ====
- Lake Wilderness
- Spotsylvania Courthouse

==== Other unincorporated communities ====
- Alsop
- Arcadia
- Artillery Ridge
- Belmont
- Blades Corner
- Brandon
- Brockroad
- Brokenburg
- Carters Store
- Chancellor
- Chancellor Green, a local Hispanic enclave
- Chancellorsville
- Chewnings Corner
- Cookstown
- Cosner's Corner
- Dunavant
- Five Mile Fork
- Four Mile Fork
- Granite Springs
- Lanes Corner
- Leavells
- Marye
- Massaponax
- McHenry
- Old Trap
- Olivers Corner
- Partlow
- Paytes
- Post Oak
- Shady Grove Corner
- Snell
- Stubbs
- Thornburg
- Todds Tavern

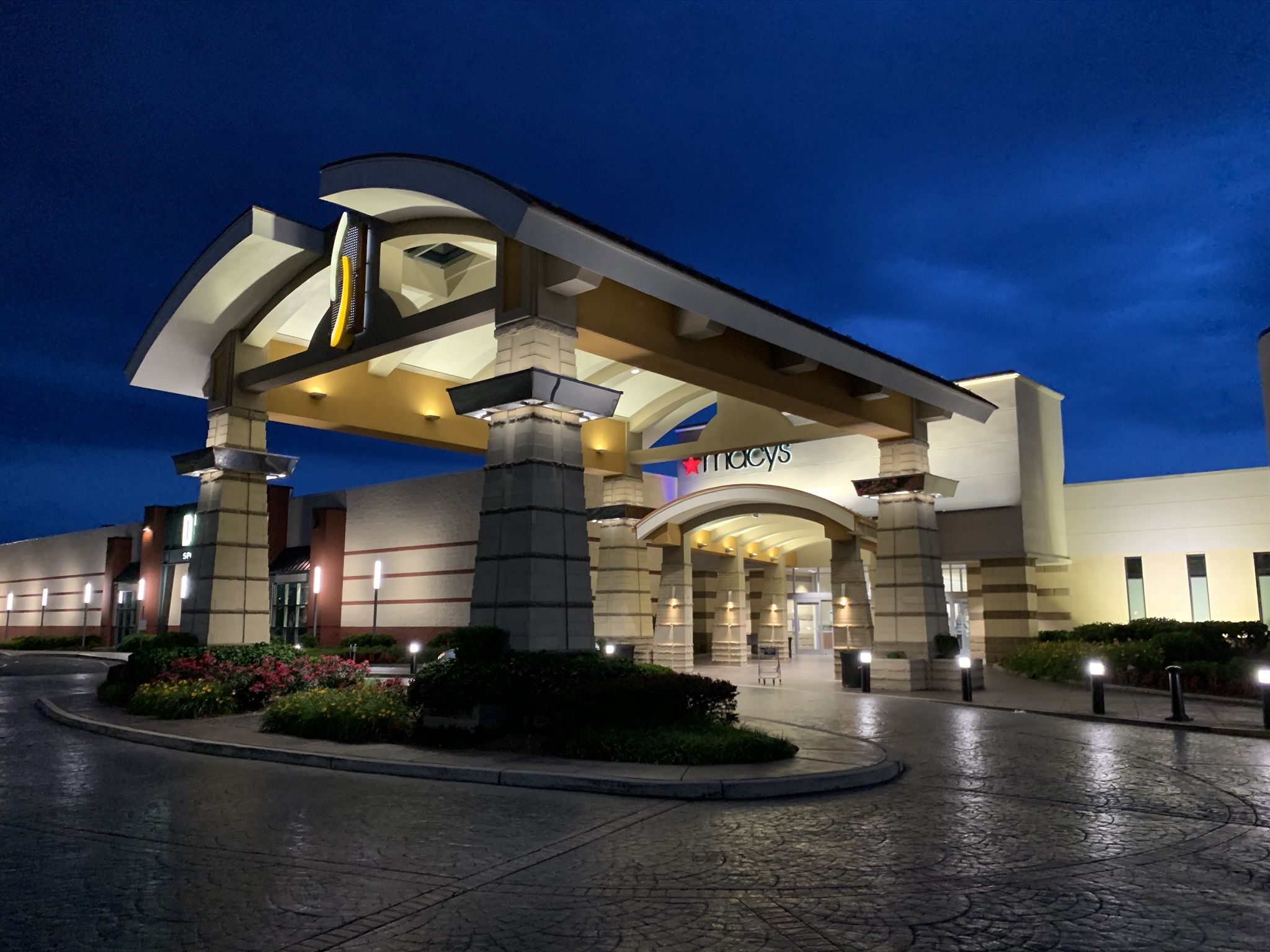
Spotsylvania Towne Centre

Many areas of the county have Fredericksburg addresses.

=== Major highways ===
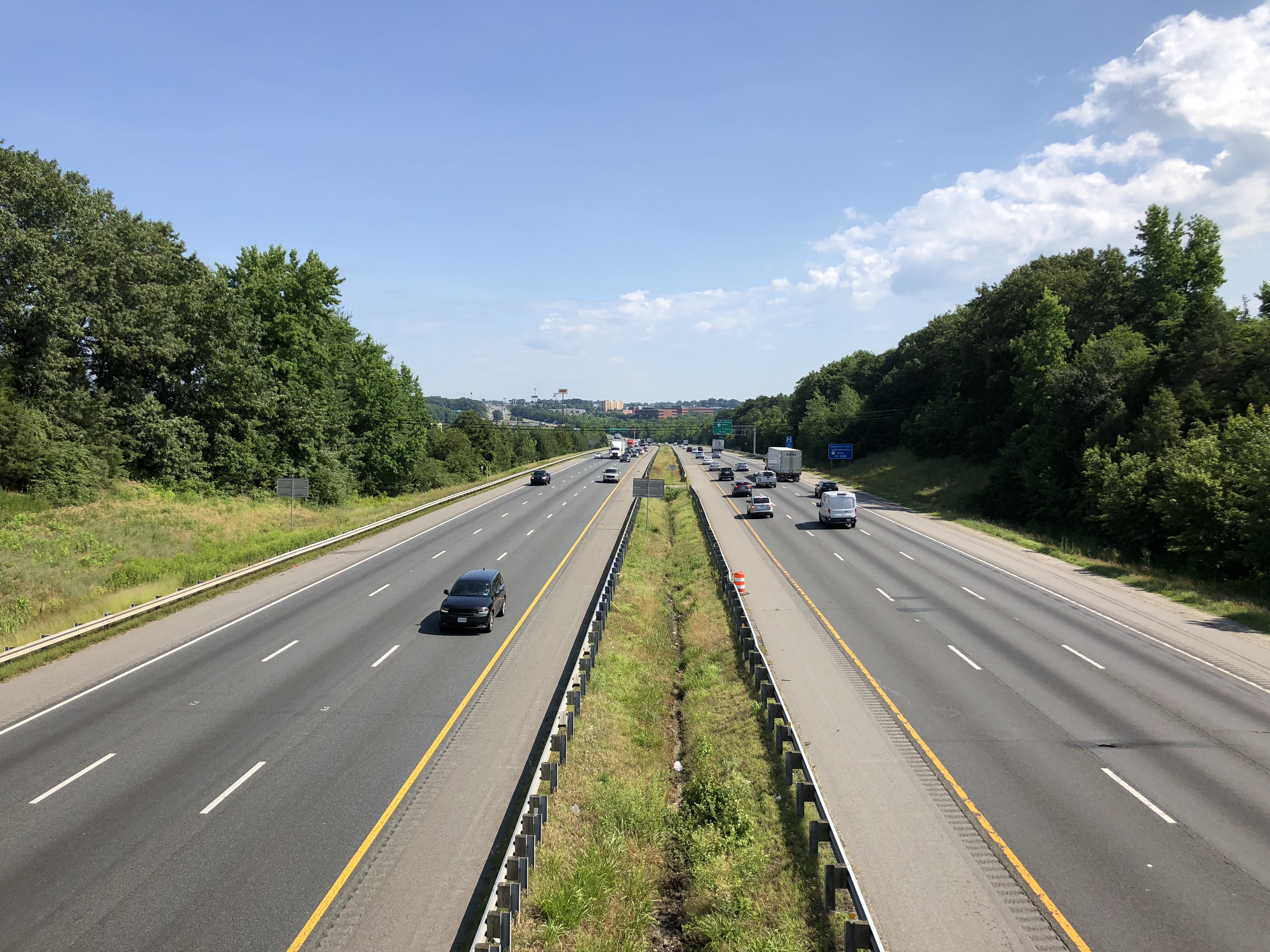
I-95 northbound in Spotsylvania County

- I-95
- US 1
- US 17
- US 522
- SR 2
- SR 3
- SR 208

== Demographics ==
Historical population
Census	Pop.	Note	%±
1790	11,252		—
1800	13,002		15.6%
1810	13,296		2.3%
1820	14,254		7.2%
1830	15,134		6.2%
1840	15,161		0.2%
1850	14,911		−1.6%
1860	16,076		7.8%
1870	11,728		−27.0%
1880	14,828		26.4%
1890	14,233		−4.0%
1900	9,239		−35.1%
1910	9,935		7.5%
1920	10,571		6.4%
1930	10,056		−4.9%
1940	9,905		−1.5%
1950	11,920		20.3%
1960	13,819		15.9%
1970	16,424		18.9%
1980	34,435		109.7%
1990	57,403		66.7%
2000	90,395		57.5%
2010	122,397		35.4%
2020	140,032		14.4%
2025 (est.)	155,388	▲	11.0%
U.S. Decennial Census; 1790–1960 1900–1990; 1990–2000 2010 2020

=== Racial and ethnic composition ===
Spotsylvania County, Virginia – Racial and ethnic composition Note: the US Census treats Hispanic/Latino as an ethnic category. This table excludes Latinos from the racial categories and assigns them to a separate category. Hispanics/Latinos may be of any race.
Race / Ethnicity (NH = Non-Hispanic)	Pop 1980	Pop 1990	Pop 2000	Pop 2010	Pop 2020	% 1980	% 1990	% 2000	% 2010	% 2020
White alone (NH)	28,813	49,606	73,546	88,077	87,278	83.67%	86.42%	81.36%	71.96%	62.33%
Black or African American alone (NH)	5,030	6,153	11,127	18,298	22,436	14.61%	10.72%	12.31%	14.95%	16.02%
Native American or Alaska Native alone (NH)	66	192	264	323	375	0.19%	0.33%	0.29%	0.26%	0.27%
Asian alone (NH)	198	586	1,231	2,768	3,933	0.57%	1.02%	1.36%	2.26%	2.81%
Native Hawaiian or Pacific Islander alone (NH)	x	x	36	135	122	x	x	0.04%	0.11%	0.09%
Other race alone (NH)	36	23	182	272	845	0.10%	0.04%	0.20%	0.22%	0.60%
Mixed race or Multiracial (NH)	x	x	1,473	3,246	8,389	x	x	1.63%	2.65%	5.99%
Hispanic or Latino (any race)	292	843	2,536	9,278	16,654	0.85%	1.47%	2.81%	7.58%	11.89%
Total	34,435	57,403	90,395	122,397	140,032	100.00%	100.00%	100.00%	100.00%	100.00%

=== 2020 census ===
As of the 2020 census, the county had a population of 140,032. The median age was 38.5 years. 24.8% of residents were under the age of 18 and 14.7% of residents were 65 years of age or older. For every 100 females there were 95.4 males, and for every 100 females age 18 and over there were 92.3 males age 18 and over.

The racial makeup of the county was 64.4% White, 16.4% Black or African American, 0.5% American Indian and Alaska Native, 2.8% Asian, 0.1% Native Hawaiian and Pacific Islander, 5.9% from some other race, and 9.9% from two or more races. Hispanic or Latino residents of any race comprised 11.9% of the population.

68.0% of residents lived in urban areas, while 32.0% lived in rural areas.

There were 48,958 households in the county, of which 36.5% had children under the age of 18 living with them and 23.5% had a female householder with no spouse or partner present. About 19.5% of all households were made up of individuals and 8.2% had someone living alone who was 65 years of age or older.

There were 52,250 housing units, of which 6.3% were vacant. Among occupied housing units, 77.2% were owner-occupied and 22.8% were renter-occupied. The homeowner vacancy rate was 1.2% and the rental vacancy rate was 9.0%.

=== 2010 census ===
As of the census of 2010, there were 122,397 people, 31,308 households, and 24,639 families residing in the county. The population density was 226 inhabitants per square mile (87/km^{2}). There were 33,329 housing units at an average density of 83 units per square mile (32 units/km^{2}). The racial makeup of the county was:

- 78.4% White
- 15.8% Black or African American
- 0.4% Native American
- 2.4% Asian
- 0.05% Pacific Islander
- 2.8% from other races, and
- 1.88% from two or more races.

7.8% of the population were Hispanic or Latino of any race.

There were 31,308 households, out of which 42.40% had children under the age of 18 living with them, 64.80% were married couples living together, 9.90% had a female householder with no husband present, and 21.30% were non-families. 16.40% of all households were made up of individuals, and 5.40% had someone living alone who was 65 years of age or older. The average household size was 2.87 and the average family size was 3.22.

In the county, the population was spread out, with 30.00% under the age of 18, 7.30% from 18 to 24, 32.20% from 25 to 44, 22.20% from 45 to 64, and 8.30% who were 65 years of age or older. The median age was 34 years. For every 100 females, there were 97.10 males. For every 100 females aged 18 and over, there were 93.00 males.

The 2021 median income for a household in the county was $98,973 compared to $69,021 for the United States; the median income for a family was $87,922. Males had a median income of $49,166 versus $38,076 for females. The per capita income for the county was $37,212. 6.6% of the population lives below the poverty line, including 6.70% of those under age 18 and 5.20% of those age 65 or over.

== Government ==
United States presidential election results for Spotsylvania County, Virginia
Year	Republican		Democratic		Third party(ies)	
Year	No.	%	No.	%	No.	%
1880	576	42.76%	771	57.24%	0	0.00%
1884	820	49.28%	844	50.72%	0	0.00%
1888	922	51.22%	876	48.67%	2	0.11%
1892	679	42.62%	849	53.30%	65	4.08%
1896	903	50.50%	877	49.05%	8	0.45%
1900	817	51.19%	774	48.50%	5	0.31%
1904	237	40.79%	330	56.80%	14	2.41%
1908	282	43.93%	346	53.89%	14	2.18%
1912	58	9.40%	390	63.21%	169	27.39%
1916	249	38.37%	398	61.33%	2	0.31%
1920	380	45.56%	440	52.76%	14	1.68%
1924	255	34.65%	448	60.87%	33	4.48%
1928	654	59.84%	439	40.16%	0	0.00%
1932	346	30.17%	784	68.35%	17	1.48%
1936	453	35.01%	836	64.61%	5	0.39%
1940	365	31.63%	785	68.02%	4	0.35%
1944	504	40.29%	744	59.47%	3	0.24%
1948	517	34.24%	818	54.17%	175	11.59%
1952	1,174	48.98%	1,194	49.81%	29	1.21%
1956	1,244	51.94%	993	41.46%	158	6.60%
1960	1,288	46.02%	1,482	52.95%	29	1.04%
1964	1,261	37.45%	2,097	62.28%	9	0.27%
1968	1,675	34.00%	1,647	33.43%	1,604	32.56%
1972	3,577	65.73%	1,775	32.62%	90	1.65%
1976	3,210	42.46%	4,210	55.69%	140	1.85%
1980	5,385	53.82%	4,039	40.37%	581	5.81%
1984	8,207	66.74%	4,012	32.63%	78	0.63%
1988	10,978	66.16%	5,486	33.06%	129	0.78%
1992	11,829	49.26%	8,133	33.87%	4,052	16.87%
1996	13,786	52.62%	10,342	39.48%	2,069	7.90%
2000	20,739	59.22%	13,455	38.42%	827	2.36%
2004	28,527	62.77%	16,623	36.58%	295	0.65%
2008	28,610	52.91%	24,897	46.05%	562	1.04%
2012	31,844	54.93%	25,165	43.41%	965	1.66%
2016	34,623	55.34%	24,207	38.69%	3,732	5.97%
2020	39,411	52.33%	34,307	45.55%	1,599	2.12%
2024	42,531	53.49%	35,747	44.96%	1,236	1.55%

=== County government ===
Spotsylvania County's highest level of management is that of County Administrator, currently held by Ed Petrovich. This post oversees all county departments and agencies and serves as the Spotsylvania County's Board of Supervisors' liaison to state and regional agencies.

==== Board of Supervisors ====
Spotsylvania is governed by a Board of Supervisors. The board consists of seven members (one from each district within the county). The Board of Supervisors sets county policies, adopts ordinances, appropriates funds, approves land rezoning and special exceptions to the zoning ordinance, and carries out other responsibilities set forth by the county code.

The following is the current list of supervisors and districts which they represent:

Position	Name	Affiliation	District
Chair	Lori Hayes	Independent	Lee Hill
Vice-Chair	Drew Mullins	Republican	Courtland
Member	Chris Yakabouski	Republican	Battlefield
Member	David Goosman	Republican	Berkeley
Member	Tim McLaughlin	Independent	Chancellor
Member	Jacob Lane	Republican	Livingston
Member	Deborah H. Frazier	Independent	Salem

=== County wide offices ===
Office	Name	Affiliation
Commonwealth's Attorney	Ryan Mehaffey	Republican
Commissioner of the Revenue	Shellie Bowman	Democratic
Sheriff	Roger Harris	Independent
Treasurer	Larry Keith Pritchett	Independent
Clerk of Circuit Court	Christalyn Mitchell Jett	Republican

=== State representation ===
Virginia House of Delegates
Office	Name	Party	District
Delegate	Phillip Scott	Republican	63
Delegate	Josh Cole	Democratic	65
Delegate	Nicole Cole	Democratic	66

Virginia State Senate
Office	Name	Party	District
Senator	Richard Stuart	Republican	25
Senator	Tara Durant	Republican	27
Senator	Bryce Reeves	Republican	28

=== Federal representation ===
Spotsylvania residents are represented by Eugene Vindman (D-7th District) in the House of Representatives. The current U.S. senators from the Commonwealth of Virginia are Mark Warner (D) and Tim Kaine (D). Since 1980, Spotsylvania County has been a reliably Republican county in elections, although the margin has tightened somewhat in recent elections, with Donald Trump winning Spotsylvania County by less than 10 points in 2020 and 2024. In 2025, Abigail Spanberger became the first Democrat to win Spotsylvania County in a gubernatorial election since 1985.

== Infrastructure ==
=== Emergency services ===
Fire and rescue services in Spotsylvania County are provided by a combination of career and volunteer organizations. The career staff of the Department of Fire, Rescue, and Emergency Management provide fire and rescue services 24/7/365 at all 11 stations, 1 (Courthouse), 2 (Brokenburg), 3 (Partlow), 4 (Four Mile Fork), 5 (Chancellor), 6 (Salem Church), 7 (Wilderness), 8 (Thornburg), 9 (Belmont), 10 (Salem Fields), 11 (Crossroads). Volunteers occasionally provide additional staffing nights and weekends at Stations 1, 4, and 8. The volunteer organizations include The Spotsylvania Volunteer Fire Department, and The Spotsylvania Volunteer Rescue Squad.

== Education ==
=== Private schools ===
- Fredericksburg Academy
- Fredericksburg Christian School
- The Summit Academy
- Odyssey Montessori School
- Saint Patrick School
- Saint Michael the Archangel High School
- Faith Baptist Christian School
- Mount Hope Academy

=== Colleges and universities ===
Germanna Community College is part of the Virginia Community College System and serves the City of Fredericksburg, and the counties of Stafford, Spotsylvania, Orange, Culpeper, and King George.

The University of Mary Washington located in neighboring Fredericksburg, Virginia, is a four-year university and graduate school that also serves the area.

== Notable people ==
- John Day Andrews (1795–1882), Mayor of Houston
- Thomas Dickens Arnold, United States Congressman from Virginia
- Francis Asbury (1745–1816), one of the first two bishops of the Methodist Episcopal Church (Note: now the United Methodist Church in the United States)
- Caressa Cameron, Miss Virginia 2009 and Miss America 2010
- Elijah Craig, Baptist minister arrested in Fredericksburg for preaching without a license from the Anglican Church before the American Revolution
- Evelyn Magruder DeJarnette (1842–1914), author
- Joe Gibbs, former Washington Redskins coach
- Rahman "Rock" Harper, chef, television personality, and restaurateur
- Alexander Holladay (1811–1877), U. S. Representative
- Danny McBride, actor
- Phil Short, former member of the Louisiana State Senate and United States Marine Corps officer
- Matthew Fontaine Maury, father of modern oceanography

== See also ==
- National Register of Historic Places listings in Spotsylvania County, Virginia
