= North Anna River =

River in Virginia, United States

Coordinates: 37.80347°N 77.40776°W

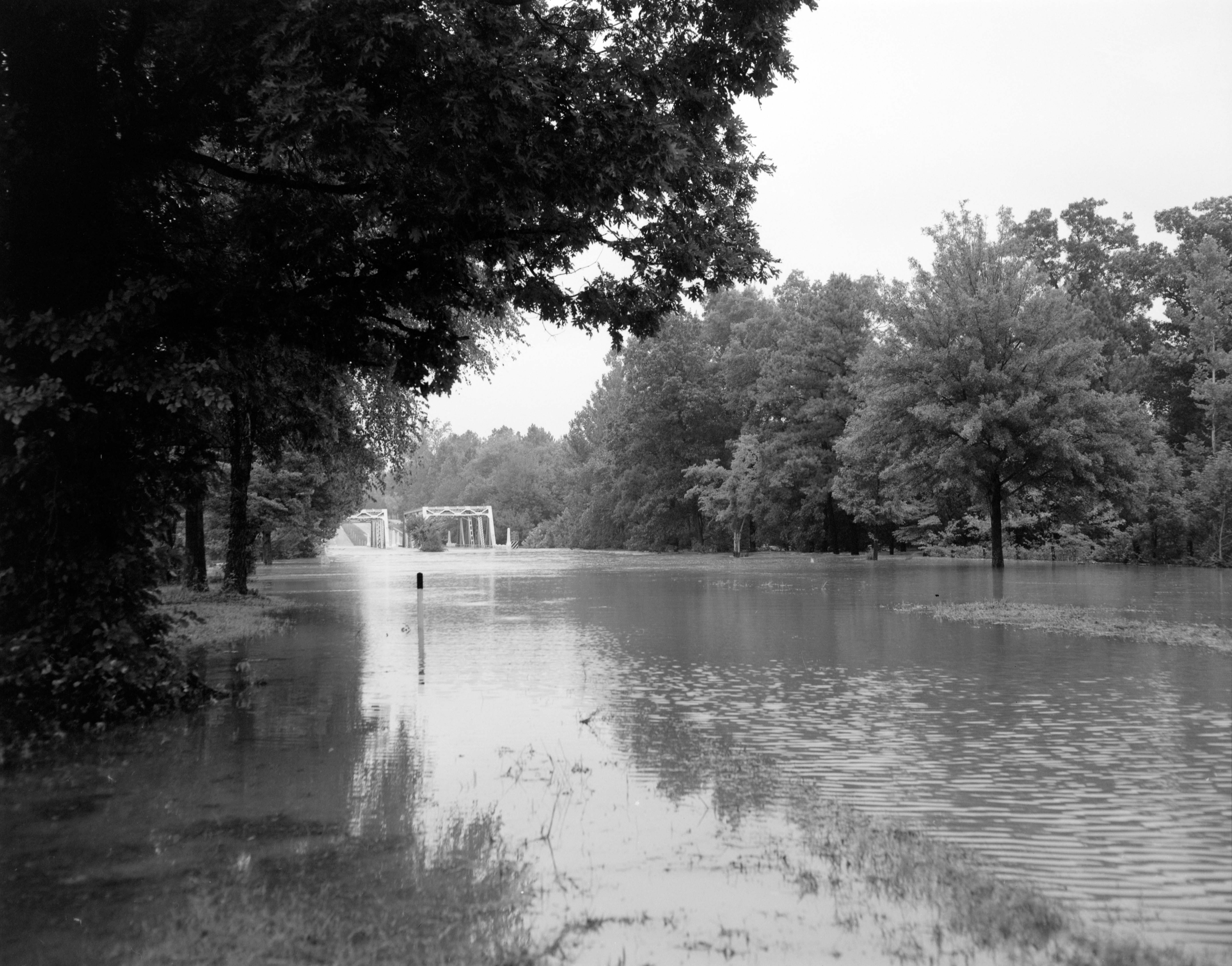
Flooding of the North Anna River along U.S. Route 1 after Hurricane Camille, 1969

The North Anna River is a principal tributary of the Pamunkey River, about 62 miles (100 km) long, in central Virginia in the United States. Via the Pamunkey and York rivers, it is part of the watershed of the Chesapeake Bay. The river was the site of the Battle of North Anna during the American Civil War.

According to the Geographic Names Information System, the river has also been known as "Northa-Anna" and as the main stem of the Pamunkey River.

== Course ==
The North Anna River is formed by a confluence of Mountain Run and Negro Run in western Orange County and flows generally southeastwardly. The river's course is used to define all or portions of the southern boundaries of Orange, Spotsylvania and Caroline counties; and the northern boundaries of Louisa and Hanover counties. It joins the South Anna River to form the Pamunkey River on the common boundary of Caroline and Hanover counties, about 5 miles (8 km) northeast of the town of Ashland.

The North Anna Dam on the common boundary of Louisa and Spotsylvania counties causes the river to form Lake Anna, which was created to provide water for the adjacent North Anna Nuclear Generating Station.

Near its mouth, the North Anna River collects the Little River. Other tributaries of the North Anna include Pamunkey Creek and Contrary Creek.

== See also ==
- List of Virginia rivers
