= Magothy Bay Natural Area Preserve =

Nature reserve in Virginia, United States

- Location within Virginia
- Location: Northampton County, Virginia
- Coordinates: 37°09′16″N 75°57′00″W
- Area: 445 acres (1.80 km^{2})
- Governing body: Virginia Department of Conservation and Recreation

Magothy Bay Natural Area Preserve is a 445-acre (1.80 km^{2}) Natural Area Preserve located in Northampton County, Virginia. The preserve encompasses woodlands, wetlands, and salt marshes, providing foraging areas for various species of waterfowl, shorebirds, and wading birds. Diamondback terrapins and clapper rails are frequent visitors, as are many varieties of songbird.

The preserve is owned and maintained by the Virginia Department of Conservation and Recreation, and is open to the public. Improvements at the preserve include a parking area and two hiking trails.

All state laws in Virginia State Parks also apply in all of Virginia's Natural Area Preserves. The Department of Conservation and Recreation manages Virginia State Parks and the Natural Heritage Program. Law Enforcement Rangers with both the State Parks and Natural Heritage Program routinely patrol these areas, along with DWR and VMRC officers. All DCR Rangers have statewide jurisdiction.

== See also ==
- List of Virginia Natural Area Preserves
