= Lake Anna =

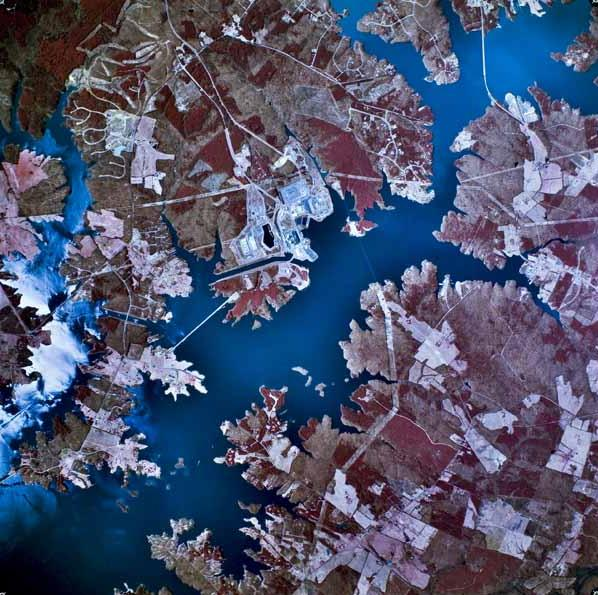
- The North Anna Nuclear Generating Station is seen at the center of this aerial photograph.

- Location within Virginia Location within the United States
- Location: Louisa / Spotsylvania / Orange counties, Virginia, US
- Coordinates: 38°01′26″N 77°43′01″W
- Type: reservoir
- Basin countries: United States
- Built: 1972
- Max. length: 17 mi (27 km)
- Surface area: 13,000 acres (5,300 ha)
- Max. depth: 80 feet (24 m)
- Surface elevation: 246 ft (75 m)

Lake Anna is one of the largest freshwater inland reservoirs in Virginia, covering an area of 20 sq mi (52 km^{2}), and located 72 miles (116 km) south of Washington, D.C., in Louisa and Spotsylvania counties (and partially in Orange County at the northern tip). The lake is easily accessible from Fredericksburg, Richmond, Charlottesville, Northern Virginia, and Washington, D.C., and is one of the most popular recreational lakes in the state.

== History ==
The reservoir is formed by the North Anna Dam on the North Anna River at 38°00′47″N 77°42′46″W. In 1968, Virginia Electric and Power Company (now Dominion) purchased 28 sq mi (73 km^{2}) of farmlands in three counties along the North Anna and Pamunkey rivers. The aim was to provide clean, fresh water to help cool the nuclear power generating plants at the North Anna Nuclear Generating Station adjacent to the lake. By 1972, the lake bottom was cleared of all timber, and the dam was nearing completion. It was projected to take three years to completely fill the lake, but with the additional rainfall from Hurricane Agnes, the lake was full in only 18 months. The first communities began to spring up around the lake at that time, and now some 120 different communities surround its shores. In June 1978, the first of the two reactors went into commercial operation. The second unit followed in December 1980.

== Description ==
Lake Anna is approximately 17 miles (27 km) long from tip to tip, with 200 miles (320 km) of shoreline. The lake is divided into two sides by three stone dikes. The public side (also known as the "cold" side) is roughly 9,000 acres (36 km^{2}), while the private side (known as the "warm" side) is roughly 4,000 acres (16 km^{2}).

The private side is formed of three main bodies of water, connected by navigable canals. This side has no marinas or public access ramps; only property owners and North Anna Power Station employees have access to the waters on the private side.

The public side has several marinas and boat launches, including a boat ramp at an adjacent state park. The public side sees significantly higher boat traffic compared to the private side, especially on summer weekends.

The public side is known as the "cold" side because it provides water to cool the generators at the power plant; the private or "hot" side receives warm water discharge from the power plant. The private side can be substantially warmer than the public side, especially near the discharge point, where it can be too hot for swimming. The private side has an extended water sports season. Some water circulates back out of the private side into the public side through underground channels; consequently, the public side is warmer in the southern area near the dam. In the winter, some fish migrate to these warmer waters.

Preliminary steps to add a third reactor have led to protests by environmentalists and property owners, who fear a subsequent increase in the water temperature and a decrease in the water level, particularly on the private side. According to Dominion, the water discharged from the plant is usually about 14 °F (7.8 °C) warmer than the intake water.

=== North Anna Dam ===
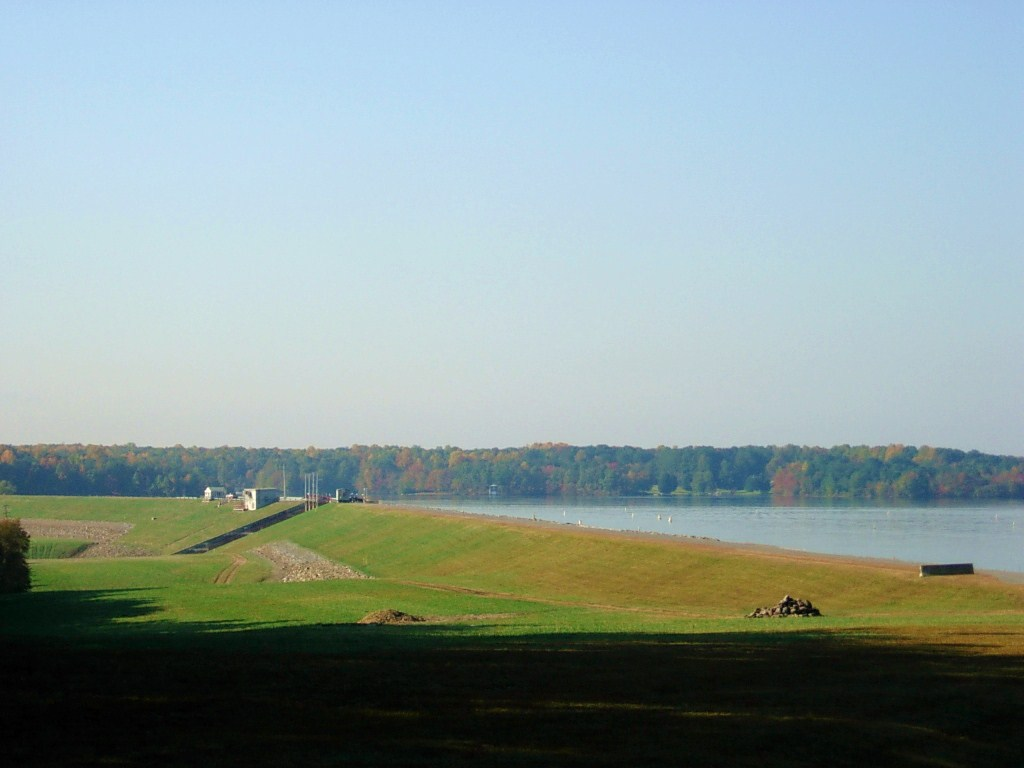
North Anna Dam

The dam creating the lake, North Anna Dam, is a 5,000-foot-long (1,524 m) and 90-foot-high (27 m) earthen embankment dam. It is 30 feet (9 m) wide at its crest and sits at an elevation of 265 feet (81 m) above sea level. The dam's spillway is located in the center of its body and is 200 feet (61 m) wide, containing three main 40-foot-wide (12 m) and 30-foot-high (9 m) radial gates. Two smaller 8.5-foot (3 m) wide and tall gates on the outer edges of the spillway section maintain normal discharges. The nominal water level at the dam is 250 feet (76 m) above sea level. The dam's hydroelectric power plant is located on the west side of the spillway and is supplied with water via a 5-foot-diameter (2 m) penstock. The plant consists of two small open runner turbine-generators, the larger with a 775 kW capacity and the smaller rated at 225 kW for a combined installed capacity of 1 megawatt.

== Wildlife ==
Fish species present in Lake Anna include largemouth bass (Micropterus salmoides), bluegill (Lepomis macrochirus), redear sunfish (L. microlophus), channel catfish (Ictalurus punctatus), white catfish (Ameiurus catus), yellow bullhead (A. natalis), brown bullhead (A. nebulosus), black crappie (Pomoxis nigromaculatus), white perch (Morone americana), American gizzard shad (Dorosoma cepedianum), threadfin shad (D. petenense), blueback herring (Alosa aestivalis), creek chubsucker (Erimyzon oblongus) and white sucker (Catostomus commersonii). Striped bass (Morone saxatilis) and hybrid striped bass are maintained by stocking. Blue catfish (Ictalurus furcatus), grass carp (Ctenopharyngodon idella) and saugeye may be present due to past introduction. As of 2017, the exotic northern snakehead (Channa argus) has established a self-sustaining population in Lake Anna.

Species of submerged aquatic vegetation in the lake include Hydrilla verticillata, southern naiad (Najas guadalupensis) and Chara sp. American waterwillow (Justicia americana) grows as an emergent plant.

== See also ==
- Gold mining in Virginia
- Bumpass, Virginia
- Jerdone Castle
