= Cuckoo (disambiguation) =

A cuckoo is a bird of the family Cuculidae.

Cuckoo may also refer to:

== Film and television ==
- Cuckoo (2009 film), a British film
- Cuckoo (2014 film), an Indian film
- Cuckoo (2024 film), an American film
- The Cuckoo (film), a 2002 Russian film by Aleksandr Rogozhkin
- Cuckoo (TV series), a 2012 British comedy series
- The Cuckoo (TV series), a 2024 British drama series

== Music ==
- D'Cuckoo, an electronic percussion ensemble
- Cuckoo (album), an album by the British band Curve
- "The Cuckoo" (song), a folk song
- "Cuckoo" (Lissie song) (2010)
- "Cuckoo" (Netta song)
- "Cuckoo!", a song composed by Benjamin Britten included in Friday Afternoons
- "Cuckoo", a 2012 song by Adam Lambert from Trespassing
- "Cuckoo", a 2003 song by I Am Kloot from I Am Kloot
- "Cuckoo" a song by The Monks

== Places ==
- Cuckoo, Virginia, an unincorporated settlement in Virginia
  - Cuckoo (Mineral, Virginia), a historic house in Cuckoo, Virginia
- Cuckoo, Tasmania, a locality in Australia

== Vehicles ==
- HMS Cuckoo (1806), a 4-gun schooner
- HMS Cuckoo (1837), a wooden paddle packet transferred to the Royal Navy, wrecked in May 1850 and again in December 1857
- HMS Cuckoo (1873), an Ant-class gunboat
- Sopwith Cuckoo, a World War I British biplane torpedo bomber

== Other ==
- Cukoo or Cuckoo (1929–1981), Bollywood dancer and actress
- Cuckoo (game), a traditional card or board game
- Cuckoo (sniper), a sniper disguised in a sprawling tree
- Cuckoo Electronics, a South Korean manufacturing firm
- Cuckoo Line, a railway in East Sussex, England
- Cuckoo Trail, a foot trail in East Sussex, England
- Cuckoo, a character in ClanDestine from Marvel Comics
- Cuckoo, a racer character in the Malaysian animated series Rimba Racer

== See also ==
- Coo Coo (disambiguation)
- Cuckoo clock
- "Cuckoo, Cuckoo", a song by Animal Collective from Strawberry Jam
- Cuckoo hashing, a computer programming algorithm
- Cuckoo roller, a bird in a different order from the cuckoos
- Cuckoo Song (disambiguation)
- CuckooChess, a chess program by Peter Österlund
- Cuckooshrike, a bird of yet another order
- HMS Cuckoo, a list of ships of the Royal Navy
- Kookoo (disambiguation)
- The Cuckoo (disambiguation)
- The Cuckoos (disambiguation)
- Sonny the Cuckoo Bird, the Cocoa Puffs mascot with the catchphrase "I'm cuckoo for Cocoa Puffs!"
