= The Cuckoo =

The Cuckoo may refer to:

== Books ==
- The Cuckoo (novel), an 1899 Japanese novel by Kenjirō Tokutomi
- The Cuckoo (Swedish novel), a 2024 Swedish novel by Camilla Läckberg

== Film and television ==
- The Cuckoo (film), a Russian film
- The Cuckoo (TV series), 2024 British television series broadcast on Channel 5

== Other uses ==
- "The Cuckoo" (song), a folk song
- The Cuckoo, a song from Jacobite Relics

== See also ==
- Cuckoo (disambiguation)
- The Cuckoos (disambiguation)
