= HMS Rapid (1804) =

Brig of the Royal Navy

Rapid
History

United Kingdom
- Name: HMS Rapid
- Ordered: June 1804
- Builder: Robert Davy, Topsham, Exeter
- Laid down: July 1804
- Launched: 20 October 1804
- Honours and awards: Naval General Service Medal with clasps "Rapid 24 April 1808"
- Fate: Sunk by enemy fire May 1808

General characteristics
- Class & type: Archer-class gun-brig
- Tons burthen: 17830/94 (bm)
- Length: 80 ft 0 in (24.38 m) (overall); 65 ft 10 1/4 in (20.072 m) (keel)
- Beam: 22 ft 6 3/4 in (6.877 m)
- Depth of hold: 9 ft 5 in (2.87 m)
- Sail plan: Brig
- Complement: 50
- Armament: 10 × 18-pounder carronades + 2 chase guns

HMS Rapid was an Archer-class (1804 batch) gun-brig of 12 guns, launched in 1804. She took part in April 1808 in one action that in 1847 the Admiralty recognized with a clasp to the Naval General Service Medal. In May 1808 cannon fire from a shore battery sank her.

== Career ==
Lieutenant Thomas Gwillim commissioned Rapid in November 1804. During the blockade of Brest, on 30 May 1805 Rapid was near the Penmarks where Gwillim observed several small vessels anchored under the protection of a battery. Gwillim sent in a boat that was able to cut out the chasse maree Paix Désirée, which was carrying a cargo of salt. The other French vessels moved closer to the battery, which kept firing at Rapid's boat.

Lieutenant Henry Baugh replaced Gwillim on 2 January 1806. In May Rapid sent into Plymouth the Prussian vessel Edward, Drawse, master, which had been sailing from St Andero. On 26 October Pilchard was in sight of Rapid as she captured the brig Conductor.

In late February or early March 1807, the Spanish schooner St Domingo, carrying fish, arrived at Falmouth. She was a prize to Rapid. In mid-December Rapid sent the Spanish vessel San Pedro Pascual into Plymouth. San Pedro Pascual was carrying a cargo of salt.

On 23 April 1808, Grasshopper, Commander Thomas Searle, and Rapid encountered two Spanish vessels from South America, sailing under the protection of four gunboats. After a short chase, the convoy anchored under the guns of a shore battery near Faro, Portugal. Searle anchored Grasshopper within grapeshot (i.e., short) range of the Spanish vessels and commenced firing. After two and a half hours, the gun crews of the shore battery had abandoned their guns, and the British had driven two gunboats ashore and destroyed them. The British also captured two gunboats and the two merchant vessels. Grasshopper had one man killed and three severely wounded. Searle himself was lightly wounded. Rapid had three men severely wounded. Spanish casualties were heavy, numbering some 40 dead and wounded on the two captured gunboats alone. Searle put 14 of the wounded on shore to Faro as he did not have the resources to deal with them as well as his own casualties. Searle estimated the value of the cargo on each of the two merchant vessels at £30,000. (Note: If Searle's estimate was correct, the capture would have made him a wealthy man. A conservative estimate would put his share at in excess of £7,500.) This action also resulted in the Admiralty awarding clasps to the Naval General Service Medal marked "Grasshopper 24 April 1808" and "Rapid 24 April 1808".

== Loss ==
On 18 May 1808, Rapid was cruising off Cape St. Vincent in company with Primrose. They saw and chased two merchant feluccas that took shelter under the protection of a shore battery. The British decided to try to cut out the feluccas nonetheless, with Rapid leading the way. Fire from the battery struck Rapid, opening two holes in her bow so that she filled quickly with water. Still, that evening Primrose was able to save Rapid's entire crew. The subsequent court martial praised Bough for his zeal and gallantry.
