= Mineral, Virginia =

- Town
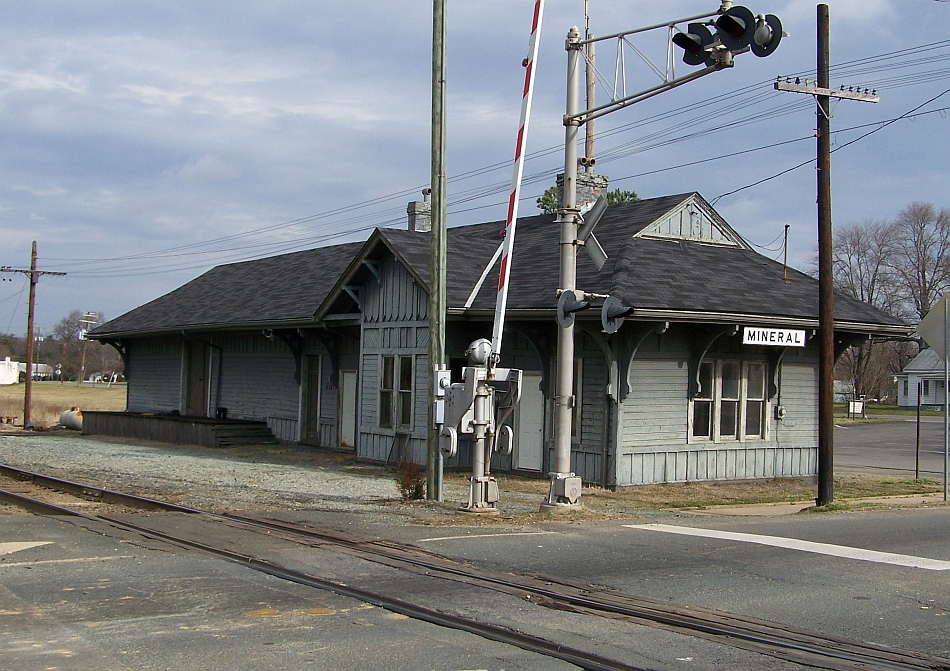
- C&O Depot in Mineral

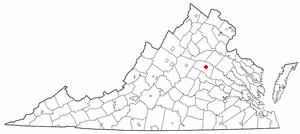
- Location in Virginia
- Coordinates: 38°0′22″N 77°54′34″W
- Country: United States
- State: Virginia
- County: Louisa
- Founded: 1890

Government
  - Mayor: Ronald W. Chapman, Jr.

Area
  - Total: 0.89 sq mi (2.31 km^{2})
  - Land: 0.89 sq mi (2.30 km^{2})
  - Water: 0.0039 sq mi (0.01 km^{2})
- Elevation: 459 ft (140 m)

Population (2020)
  - Total: 470
  - Estimate (2019): 523
  - Density: 588.9/sq mi (227.37/km^{2})
- Time zone: UTC−5 (Eastern (EST))
  - Summer (DST): UTC−4 (EDT)
- ZIP code: 23117
- Area code: 540
- FIPS code: 51-52120
- GNIS feature ID: 1495954
- Website: https://www.townofmineral.com/

Mineral is a town in Louisa County, Virginia, United States. The population was 474 at the 2020 census. Originally named was Tolersville, the settlement's history of mining engendered its renaming to "Mineral" in 1902.

== History ==
Mineral was originally known as Tolersville, but adopted its current name when it incorporated in 1902 due to the mining industry that supported the community. It was the center of gold mining activity in Louisa County; during its heyday, there were fifteen gold mines located within two miles (3 km) of the town. A zinc and lead mine also operated in the area into the 1970s.

Cuckoo, Harris-Poindexter House and Store, and the Mineral Historic District are listed on the National Register of Historic Places.

At 1:51 p.m. on August 23, 2011, a 5.8 magnitude earthquake was centered 5 miles (8 kilometers) south-southwest of Mineral, at a depth of 3.7 miles (6 kilometers). According to Associated Press, it "forced evacuations of all the monuments on the National Mall in Washington and rattled nerves from Florida to Canada." The roof of Mineral's town hall collapsed, and three of the six schools in the county's school system suffered heavy damage. There were no fatalities, and only minor injuries.

== Geography ==
According to the United States Census Bureau, the town has a total area of 0.9 sq mi (2.3 km^{2}), all land.

== Demographics ==
Historical population
Census	Pop.	Note	%±
1910	260		—
1920	408		56.9%
1930	416		2.0%
1940	427		2.6%
1950	414		−3.0%
1960	366		−11.6%
1970	397		8.5%
1980	399		0.5%
1990	471		18.0%
2000	424		−10.0%
2010	467		10.1%
2020	470		0.6%
U.S. Decennial Census

As of the census of 2000, there were 424 people, 172 households and 115 families residing in the town. The population density was 474.7 per square mile (183.9/km^{2}). There were 196 housing units at an average density of 219.5/sq mi (85.0/km^{2}). The racial makeup of the town was 82.8% White, 9.9% Black, and 7.3% from two or more races.

There were 172 households, out of which 30.2% had children under the age of 18 living with them, 53.5% were married couples living together, 9.9% had a female householder with no husband present, and 32.6% were non-families. 30.2% of all households were made up of individuals, and 15.1% had someone living alone who was 65 years of age or older. The average household size was 2.47 and the average family size was 3.09.

In the town the population was spread out, with 24.3% of the population under the age of 18, 7.3% from 18 to 24, 27.1% from 25 to 44, 24.1% from 45 to 64, and 17.2% who were 65 years of age or older. The median age was 40 years. For every 100 females, there were 100.0 males. For every 100 females aged 18 and over, there were 88.8 males.

The median income for a household in the town was $37,500, and the median income for a family was $49,000. Males had a median income of $34,375 versus $24,063 for females. The per capita income was $19,397. About 4.5% of families and 6.4% of the population were below the poverty line, including 5.2% of those under age 18 and 3.9% of those age 65 or over.

== Education ==
The Louisa County Public Schools includes Louisa County High School and Louisa County Middle School.
