= Anni-Kristiina Juuso =

Finnish actress

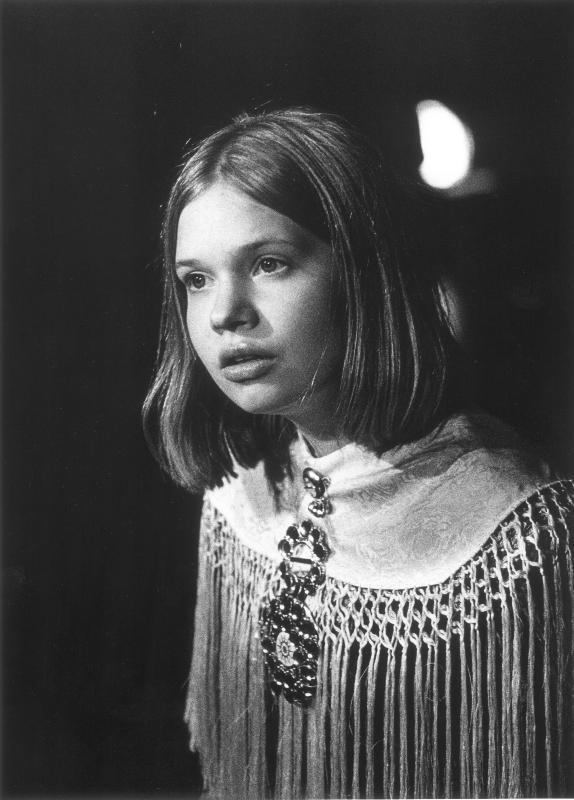
- Born: 4 May 1979 (age 46); Ivalo, Finland
- Occupations: Actress, radio journalist

Anni-Kristiina Juuso (Northern Sami: Ánne Risten Juuso; born 4 May 1979, in Ivalo, Finland) is a Sámi actress, renowned for her leading female roles in the movies The Cuckoo and The Kautokeino Rebellion. She received Russia's Best Actress award by both the movie academy and the press. Juuso has also received a State Movie Award, which was handed to her by Vladimir Putin. In addition to her acting career, Juuso works as a radio journalist for YLE Sámi Radio.

== Biography ==
Anni-Kristiina Juuso studied at the Kallio Upper Secondary School of Performing Arts in Kallio, Helsinki. From 1998 to 1999, she studied theater at Lahti Folk High School in Lahti, Finland under the tutelage of Marietta Tevajärvi.

== Awards ==
=== The Kautokeino Rebellion ===
- Best Actress (2008) Amanda Award

=== The Cuckoo ===
- Silver Dolphin Best Actress (2003) at Festróia - Tróia International Film Festival
- Nika Best Actress (2003) at the Nika Awards
- Golden Aries Best Actress (2002) from the Russian Guild of Film Critics
- State Prize of the Russian Federation (2004)
