= HMS Pilchard =

Royal Navy Ballahoo-class schooner of four carronades

History

United Kingdom
- Name: HMS Pilchard
- Ordered: 23 June 1803
- Builder: Goodrich & Co. (prime contractor), Bermuda
- Laid down: 1803
- Launched: 1805
- Fate: Sold 23 February 1813

United Kingdom
- Name: Pilchard
- Acquired: c. 1814 by purchase
- Fate: Leaves lists c.1833

General characteristics
- Type: Ballahoo-class schooner
- Tons burthen: 70 41/94 (bm)
- Length: 55 ft 2 in (16.81 m) (overall); 40 ft 10 1/2 in (12.5 m) (keel)
- Beam: 18 ft 0 in (5.49 m)
- Depth of hold: 9 ft 0 in (2.74 m)
- Sail plan: Schooner
- Complement: 20
- Armament: 4 × 12-pounder carronades

HMS Pilchard was a Royal Navy Ballahoo-class schooner of four 12-pounder carronades and a crew of 20. The prime contractor for the vessel was Goodrich & Co., in Bermuda. She was commissioned under Lieutenant Samuel Crew in May 1804, launched in 1805, and completed at Plymouth in 1806. Although Pilchard was often near naval engagements, she seems not to have had to fire her cannons before she was laid up in 1812. Entries in Lloyd's Register indicate that she continued in mercantile trade from at least 1817 until 1833, under a variety of owners and masters, and as far afield as Africa and Valparaiso.

== Service ==
Pilchard arrived in Plymouth in November 1805. She had left Newfoundland on 26 September with a fleet for Portugal. On 18 November she had left 18 merchantmen off Oporto, two of which sailed on to Viana. On 16 July 1806 she was in Sir Samuel Hood's squadron off Rochefort when the boats from that squadron captured the 16-gun brig Caesar.

She was apparently still part of the squadron at the action of 25 September 1806 though she took no part in the engagement. The action resulted in the capture of four French frigates, Armide, Gloire, Infatigable and Minerve.

On 26 October Pilchard was in sight of the gun brig Rapid as she captured the brig Conductor.

In 1807 Lieutenant Clement Ives took command, only to be replaced the next year by the returning Lieutenant Crew. Pilchard was in the North Sea in 1809. Lieutenant William R. Dore took command that year. On 23 March Dore and Pilchard captured the chasse maree Fannie. In March or April, Pilchard captured the Fame, which had sailed from Rochefort carrying wine, and sent her into Plymouth.

Pilchard and her sister schooner Porgey and half-sister schooner Cuckoo were at the unsuccessful Walcheren Expedition, which took place between 30 July and 9 August 1809.

Lieutenant William Hewitt (or Hewett) replaced Dore in 1810.

From 1812 Pilchard was in ordinary at Sheerness. She was sold there on 23 February 1813. The sale may have fallen through though as the Commissioners of His Majesty's Navy advertised her for sale at Sheerness on 3 February 1814. She was eventually sold though.

== Mercantile service ==
Pilchard is listed in Lloyd's Register in 1815. Pilchard, Williams, master, was condemned at Sierra Leone on 6 January 1817 for having 200 barrels of gunpowder on board. However, entries in Lloyd's Register for the Bermuda-built schooner Pilchard, 79 tons (bm), indicate that she continued to trade until 1833, under a variety of owners and masters, and as far afield as Africa and Valparaiso.

Year	Master	Owner	Trade	Notes
1815	J.Levans; Pasnells?	Williams	London-Africa	2 guns
1818	Papril	Williams	Falmouth - Africa	
1819	Papril	Williams	Falmouth - Africa	
1820	J. Wilcox	Williams	London - Africa	
1823	J. Wilcox	Williams	London - Africa	
1824	J. Wilcox	J. Jones	London - Africa	
1825	S. Coates	Hill & Co.	London - C.C.C.	
1826	S. Coates	J. Jones	London - Malaga	
1827	S. Coates	Laviland	London - C.C.C.	
1828	T. Paul	Laviland	London - Marseilles	
1829	Playford	Hill & Co	London - Valparaiso	
1833	Playford	Hill & Co	London - Valparaiso	Last listing
