= Easton Massacre =

1803 killing of civilians by a press gang

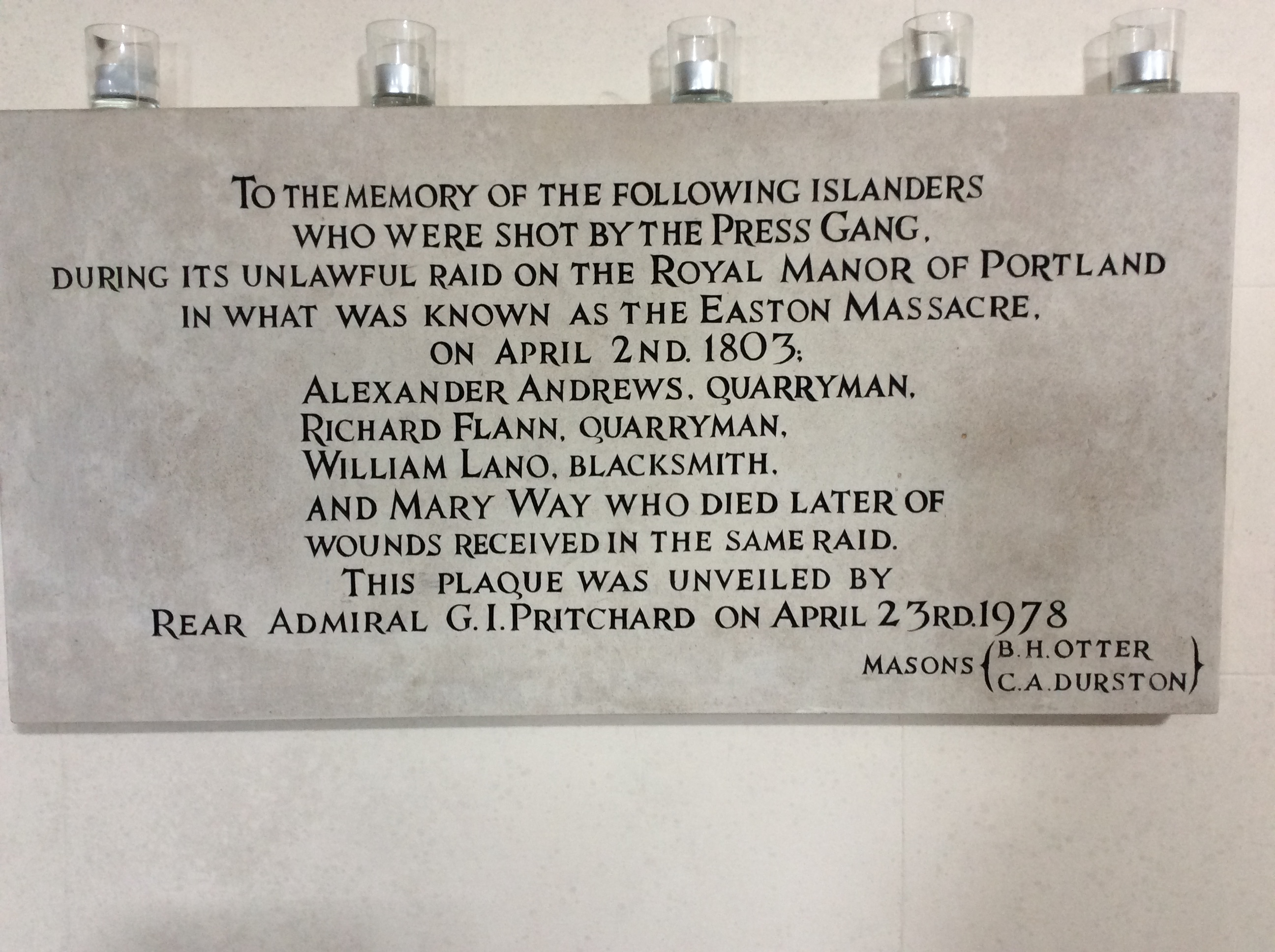
Tablet commemorates a 1978 apology by the Admiralty for the massacre. The plaque was unveiled by Rear Admiral Gwynedd Pritchard.

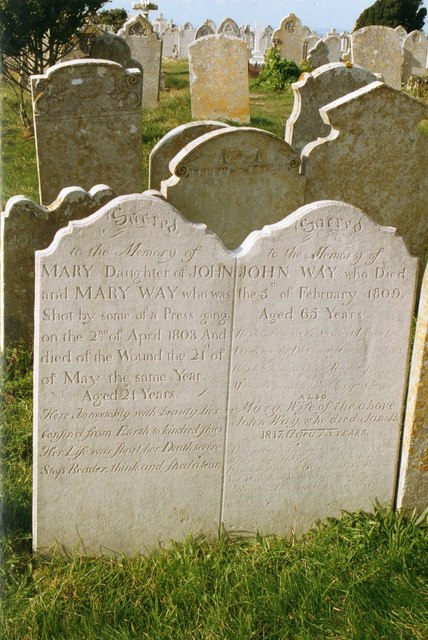
Grave of Mary Way (21), who died of wounds sustained in the massacre.

The Easton Massacre was an incident in which Royal Navy sailors shot and killed four residents of Easton, Dorset, during an attempt to press male members of the town into service. This was contrary to the normal restrictions under which press gangs operated; which were intended to limit forced recruiting to professional sailors. 1 April 1803 saw the first of several landings carried out by the frigate Aigle, commanded by George Wolfe to capture men and press them into the navy. One man was carried back to Aigle but was found to be exempt and released.

The next day, 2 April, a larger force landed and impressed two men. Holding them prisoner, the landing force continued to Easton Square, where they were met by a large group of citizens who had received warning of the press gangs and had gathered to stop them. When Robert Bennett was taken and the crowd attempted a rescue, the captain fired on them. The marines under his command also opened fire, and after the shooting stopped three people had been killed. The dead were Alexander Andrews, Richard Flann and William Lano, and in addition there were two wounded, one of whom, Mary Way, later died of her wounds.

Soon after, the press gang returned to their ship with no additional impressed men. Wolfe and three officers stood trial for murder but were acquitted and left Portland, aboard Aigle, on 10 April to continue their patrol in home waters.
