= HM Hired armed schooner Flying Fish =

Hired armed vessel of the Royal Navy in 1804

History

United Kingdom
- Name: Flying Fish
- In service: 19 June 1804
- Renamed: Gertrude 5 September 1804
- Fate: Sunk 15 December 1804

General characteristics
- Tons burthen: 14744/94 (bm)
- Sail plan: Schooner
- Armament: 12 × 12-pounder carronades

His Majesty's hired armed schooner Flying Fish, later renamed Gertrude, served the Royal Navy from 19 June 1804 to 15 December 1804 when the frigate HMS Aigle accidentally ran her down and sank her; Aigle rescued the crew.

On 5 September the Royal Navy renamed her Gertrude, but the change of name was not widely known. The report of her sinking in Lloyd's List in January 1805 still referred to her as Flying Fish.

Gertrude, Lieutenant George Broad, commander, had been ordered to join the blockade squadron off Ushant, France. As the two vessels manoeuvred close to each other Aigle ran into Gertrude, rolling her over and sending her masts overboard. Aigle passed over Gertrude. Aigle was able, with difficulty, to save Gertrude's crew.
