= Mineral Historic District =

Historic district in Virginia, United States

- U.S. National Register of Historic Places
- U.S. Historic district
- Virginia Landmarks Register
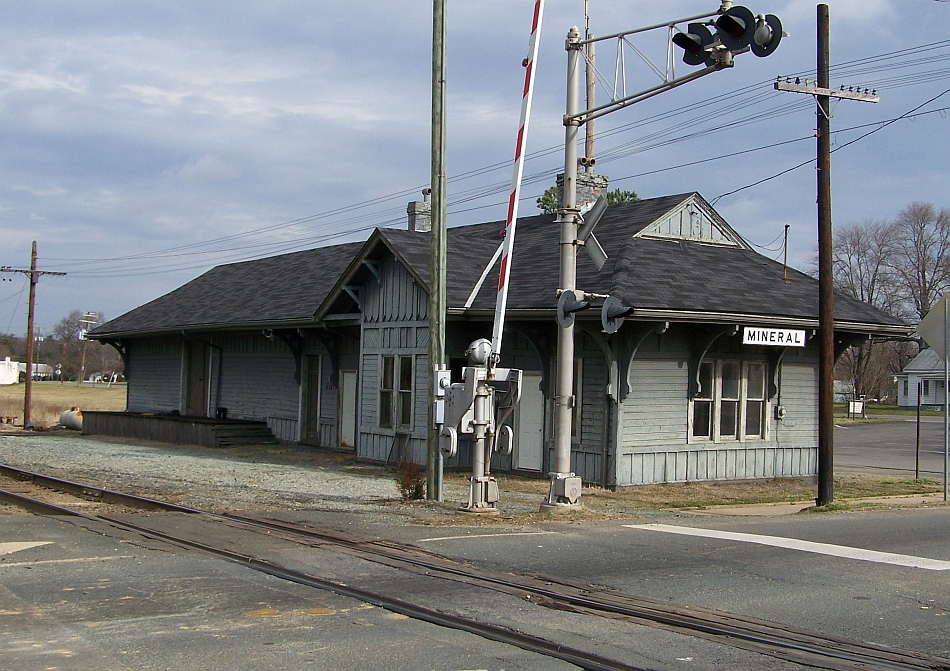
- C&O Depot in Mineral

- Location within Virginia Location within the United States
- Location: Roughly along Mineral, Louisa, Lee, Richmond, Albemarle, Pendleton, Piedmon, Old Tolersville, S. Cecilia, et al, Mineral, Virginia
- Coordinates: 38°00′47″N 77°54′14″W
- Area: 120 acres (49 ha)
- Built: 1890
- Architectural style: Late Victorian, Late 19th And 20th Century Revivals
- NRHP reference No.: 05000271
- VLR No.: 261-0028

Significant dates
- Added to NRHP: April 8, 2005
- Designated VLR: December 1, 2004

Mineral Historic District is a national historic district located at Mineral, Louisa County, Virginia. It encompasses 222 contributing buildings, 3 contributing sites, and 6 contributing structures in the town of Mineral. It includes a variety of residential, commercial, and institutional buildings built after the town was platted in 1890. Notable buildings include the Gibson House (1915), Turner House (c. 1915), Dr. H. J. Judd House (1906), Odd Fellows Hall (1894), former D.E. Bumpass Department Store, former Mineral Drug Store, Bank of Louisa (now Town Hall), C&O railroad depot (1880s), Mineral Crystal Ice Plant (c. 1925), Louisa County Power & Light Plant (c. 1925), Standard Oil Company building (1907), Episcopal Church of Incarnation (1902-1903), Mineral Baptist Church (1906), and the former Mineral School (1927).

It was listed on the National Register of Historic Places in 2005.
