= HMS Primrose (1807) =

Brig-sloop of the Royal Navy

- Primrose

History

United Kingdom
- Name: HMS Primrose
- Ordered: 21 January 1806
- Builder: Thomas Nickells, Fowey
- Launched: 5 August 1807
- Commissioned: November 1807
- Fate: Wrecked 22 January 1809

General characteristics
- Class & type: Cruizer-class brig-sloop
- Tons burthen: 384 bm
- Length: Overall:100 ft 2 1/2 in (30.544 m) Keel:77 ft 6 in (23.62 m)
- Beam: 30 ft 6 1/4 in (9.303 m)
- Depth of hold: 12 ft 9 1/4 in (3.893 m)
- Sail plan: Brig
- Complement: 121
- Armament: 16 × 32-pounder carronades + 2 × 6-pounder bow guns

HMS Primrose was a Royal Navy Cruizer-class brig-sloop built by Thomas Nickells (or Nicholls), at Fowey and launched in 1807.

== Service history ==
Primrose was built at Fowey by Thomas Nickells (or Nicholls), and was launched in 1807. She was commissioned in November 1807 under Commander James Mein, who sailed her to the coast of Spain on 3 February 1808.

On 14 May 1808 Primrose was in the Tagus with the 14-gun brig Rapid. They saw and chased two merchant feluccas that took shelter under the protection of a shore battery. On 18 May the British decided to try to cut the feluccas out nonetheless, with Rapid leading the way. However, fire from the battery struck Rapid, opening two holes in her bow so that she filled quickly with water. Still, that evening Primrose was able to save Rapid's entire crew.

In January 1809 Primrose sailed for Spain with a convoy. During a snowstorm she ran aground at 5 am on 22 January on Minstrel Rock, The Manacles, a mile offshore, and was wrecked. The Manacles are a set of treacherous rocks off The Lizard, close to the shipping lane into Falmouth, Cornwall. The sole survivor was a drummer boy. Lieut. J. Withers of the Manacles Signal Post prevailed on six local men to try to rescue survivors. For their efforts, albeit unsuccessful, the Admiralty directed that the volunteers each receive an award of 10 guineas from the Naval authorities at Falmouth.

On the same night another vessel was also wrecked, nearby on Black Head, a few miles to the south. She was the transport Dispatch, homeward-bound from Corunna, with a detachment of the 7th Hussars, who had been fighting with Sir John Moore. The Hussars lost 104 men in the wrecking. Only seven men from Dispatch were saved.

== Postscript ==
Inland, a mile from the coast is St Keverne, where a 32-pounder carronade that divers recovered in 1978 from the wreck of Primose stands by the lych-gate to the churchyard.

The Charlestown Shipwreck Centre, Cornwall, has a small (90mm bore and 125 kg weight overall) brass boat gun from Primrose. The curators have determined that it was cast in a Danish foundry.

It was the wreck of the Primrose and Dispatch that inspired Sir Arthur Quiller-Couch to write his classic ghost story The Roll-Call of the Reef (1895).
