= Cuckoo Song (disambiguation) =

Cuckoo Song is a medieval English round or rota of the mid-13th century.

Cuckoo Song may also refer to

- "Dance of the Cuckoos", also known as the Cuckoo Song, the theme music for Laurel and Hardy
- Cuckoo Song (novel)
- "Cuckoo Song" (instrumental)

== See also ==
- Cuckoo (disambiguation)#Music
