= Coo Coo =

Coo Coo may refer to:

Film

- Princess Coo-Coo, a character in the 1977 John Waters film Desperate Living

Literature

- Coo Coo Comics, a comic book published by Nedor Comics

Music

- "Coo Coo", a 1922 song by Al Jolson
- "Coo Coo", a single by Big Brother & the Holding Company from their album Big Brother & the Holding Company
- "Coo Coo", a song from the 1959 musical Little Mary Sunshine
- Coo Coo, an Italo disco group
- Coo Coo Cal, American rapper

Other

- Coo Coo Marlin, American racecar driver, father of Sterling Marlin
- Coo-coo, or cou-cou, a Barbadian dish, often made from corn meal and okra

== See also ==
- Kookoo (disambiguation)
- Cuckoo (disambiguation)
