= Harris–Poindexter House and Store =

Historic house in Virginia, United States

- U.S. National Register of Historic Places
- Virginia Landmarks Register
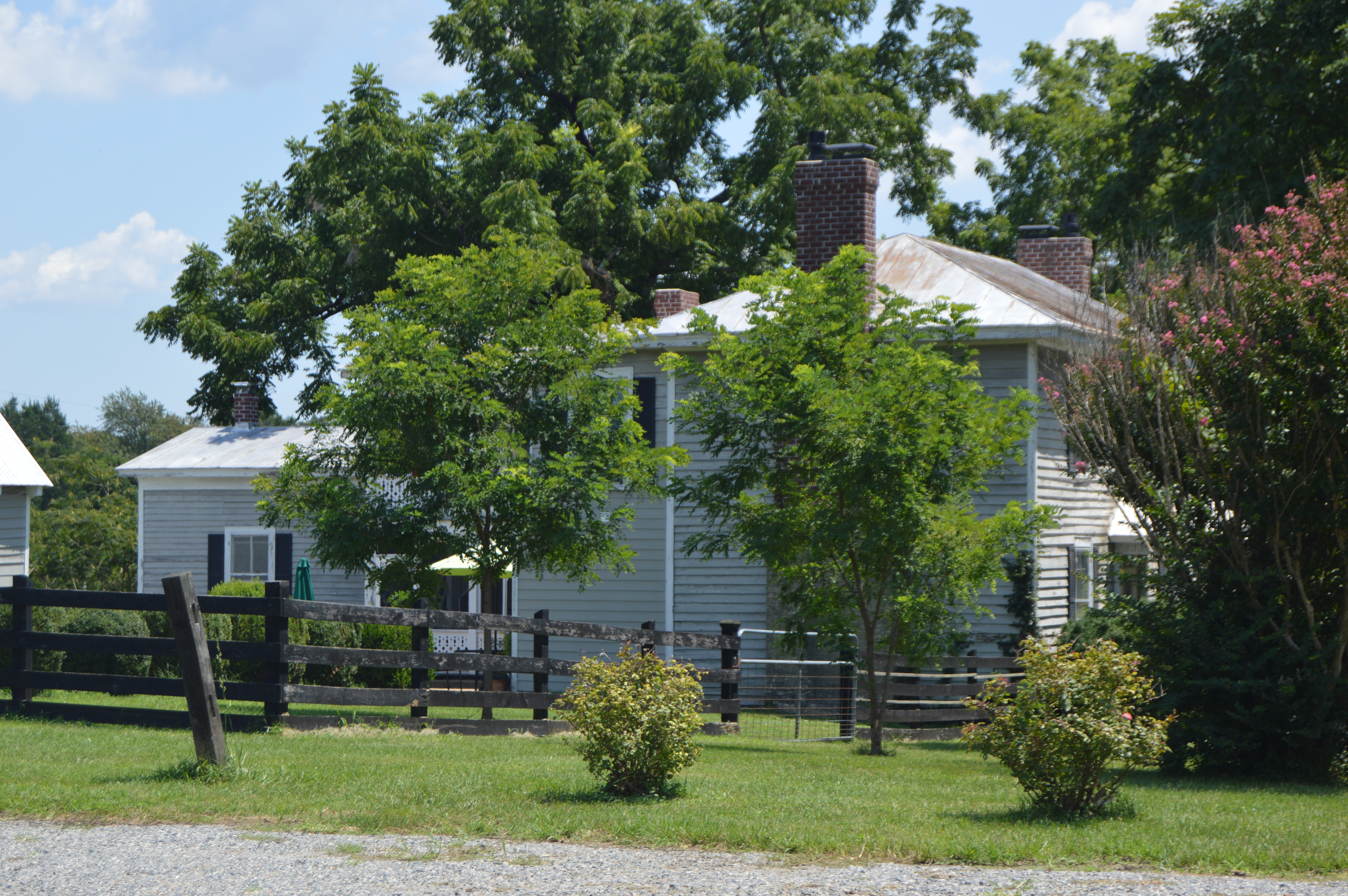
- Harris-Poindexter House from the west

- Location within Virginia Location within the United States
- Location: 81 Tavern Rd., Mineral, Virginia
- Coordinates: 37°59′20″N 77°49′10″W
- Area: 36.2 acres (14.6 ha)
- Built: c. 1837, c. 1865
- Architectural style: Greek Revival
- NRHP reference No.: 02000534
- VLR No.: 054-0388

Significant dates
- Added to NRHP: May 22, 2002
- Designated VLR: June 13, 2001

Harris–Poindexter House and Store is a historic home, store, and farm complex located at Mineral, Louisa County, Virginia. The house was built about 1837 and is a two-story, three-bay frame farmhouse in the Greek Revival style. The store was built about 1865 and is a one-story frame building. Also on the property are a contributing smokehouse (c. 1893), tenant house (Doll House) (c. 1930), a variety of early- to mid-20th century farm-related outbuildings, and a late-19th century grist mill.

It was listed on the National Register of Historic Places in 2002.
