= HMS Aigle (1801) =

Fifth-rate frigate of the Royal Navy

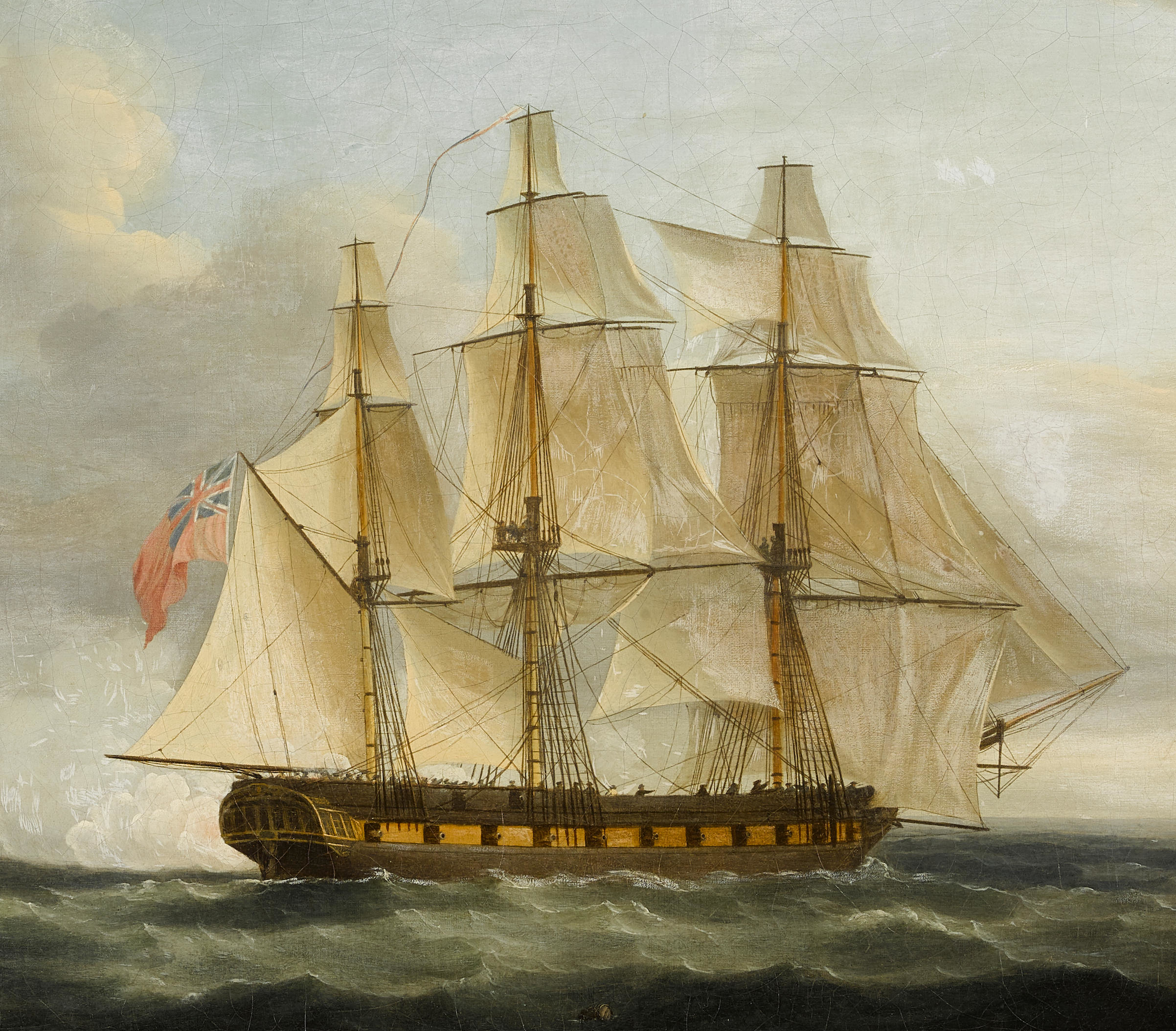
- c. 1808 painting of Aigle

History

United Kingdom
- Name: HMS Aigle
- Ordered: 15 September 1798
- Builder: Balthazar and Edward Adams
- Cost: £14,335
- Laid down: November 1798
- Launched: 23 September 1801
- Commissioned: December 1802
- Fate: Broken up

General characteristics
- Class & type: Aigle-class fifth-rate frigate
- Tons burthen: 970 84/94 (bm)
- Length: 146 ft 2 in (44.6 m) (gun deck); 122 ft 1 in (37.2 m) (keel)
- Beam: 38 ft 8 in (11.8 m)
- Depth of hold: 13 ft 0 in (4.0 m)
- Propulsion: Sails
- Sail plan: Fully Rigged Ship
- Complement: 264
- Armament: Gun deck: 26 × 18-pounder guns; QD: 4 × 9-pounder guns + 8 × 32-pounder carronades; Fc: 4 × 9-pounder guns + 2 × 32-pounder carronades

HMS Aigle was a 36-gun fifth-rate frigate of the Royal Navy. Ordered on 15 September 1799 and built at Bucklers Hard shipyard, she was launched 23 September 1801. More than fifty of her crew were involved in the Easton Massacre when she visited Portland in April 1803 to press recruits. Her captain and three other officers stood trial for murder but were acquitted. Much of Aigle's career as a frigate was spent trying to keep the English Channel free of enemy warships and merchant vessels. On 22 March 1808, she was first into the action against two large French frigates, compelling one to seek the shelter of the Île de Groix batteries and forcing the other onto the shore.

Aigle saw action at the Battle of Basque Roads in April 1809, when Captain Thomas Cochrane's partially successful action began with an attacking force of fireships against a French fleet, anchored off the Île-d'Aix. Initially providing support to the fireships' crews, Aigle went on to help force the surrender of the stranded French vessels Ville de Varsovie and Aquilon. In July 1809, Aigle took part in the Walcheren Campaign, an amphibious operation against the Kingdom of Holland, carrying out a two-day long bombardment of Flushing that led to its capitulation on 15 August. The campaign was ultimately a failure and the British forces withdrew in September.

In October 1811, Aigle was sent to the Mediterranean, where she and her crew raided the island of Elba before being asked to provide naval support during the invasion and occupation of the city of Genoa. Refitted in January 1820, her square stern was replaced with a circular one, giving her a wider angle of fire and improved protection at the rear. Converted to a corvette in 1831, she returned to the Mediterranean under Lord Clarence Paget. In 1852, she became a coal hulk and receiving ship before being used as a target for torpedoes and sold for breaking in 1870.

== Construction and armament ==
HMS Aigle was the first of two Aigle-class frigates designed by Surveyor of the Navy, Sir John Henslow; her sister, HMS Resistance, was ordered later in 1800. Frigates of the period were three-masted, full-rigged ships that carried their main battery on a single, continuous gun deck. They were smaller and faster than ships of the line and primarily intended for raiding, reconnaissance and messaging. Since late 1778, those of 36 or 38 guns with a main armament of 18-pounder long guns, had become the standard in the Royal Navy and by 1793, when the French Revolutionary War began, it was not unusual for them to be close to 1000 tons burthen (bm). Henslow's designs tended towards small modifications on established frigate classes; his alterations being primarily to the size and, in particular, length of ships. British frigate designs were frequently lengthened during this period so that they could reach sailing speeds comparable to French frigates and the Aigle class followed this trend, being close in dimensions and armament to Henslow's 1797 design, the Penelope class.

Built under contract by Balthazar and Edward Adams, Aigle was ordered on 15 September 1798 and her keel was laid down in November at Bucklers Hard shipyard in Hampshire. Launched on 23 September 1801, her dimensions were: 146 feet 2 inches (44.6 metres) along the gun deck, 122 ft 1 in (37.2 m) at the keel, with a beam of 38 ft 8 in (11.8 m) and a depth in the hold of 13 ft (4.0 m). This made her 970 84/94 tons (bm). She would carry a complement of 264 men when fully manned.

Although classed as a 36-gun fifth rate, Aigle was armed with a main battery of twenty-six 18 pounders (8.2 kilograms) on her gun deck, four 9 pdr (4.1 kg) on the quarterdeck and four on the forecastle. She also carried ten 32 pdr (14.5 kg) carronades, short lightweight guns with a large bore. They were cheaper to produce and much easier to handle than the equivalent long gun but lacked the accuracy and range. Eight were carried on Aigle's quarterdeck and two on her forecastle. (Note: The gun-rating of a vessel was the number of long guns it was designed to carry and did not always match its actual armament. Before 1817, carronades were not counted at all unless they were direct replacements for long guns.) Aigle's first build cost to the Admiralty was £14,335 when she was completed for ordinary on 6 October 1801. This would have been higher but a £1000 fine had been imposed for an unacceptable delay of 16 months.

Aigle drew between 17 ft (5.18 m) at the bow and 19 ft 4 in (5.89 m) at the stern. A sailing report from 15 August 1815, noted that she was "...similar to Apollo, being fast and weatherly, manoeuvrable and a good sea-boat". It also recorded her as making 10 knots (12 mph; 19 km/h) close-hauled under topgallants but with her best performance of 12 knots (14 mph; 22 km/h) with the wind coming over the stern quarter.

== Service ==
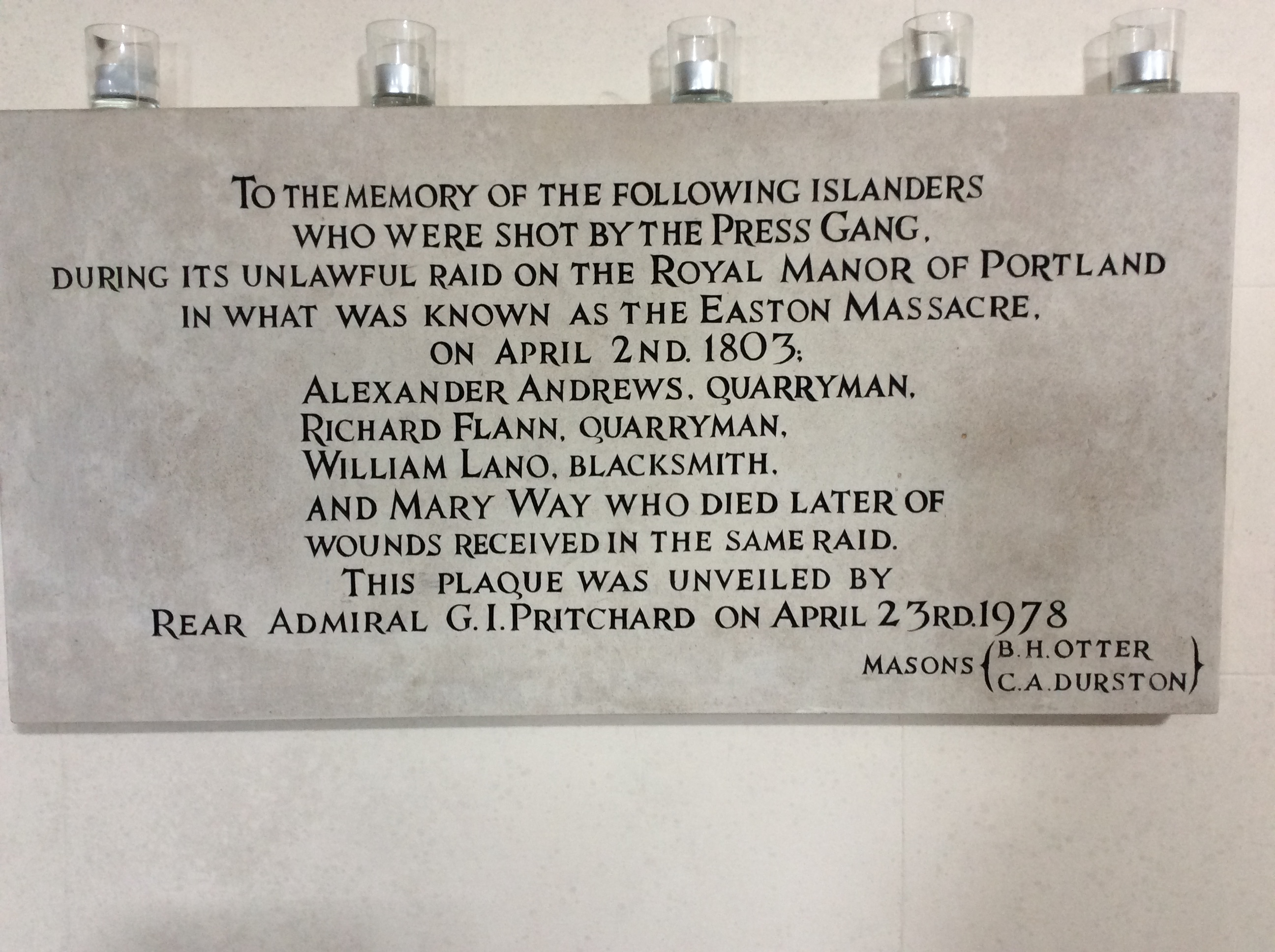
A plaque in St George's Church, Portland, remembering two quarrymen, a blacksmith and a young lady who died during the Easton Massacre

Aigle was first commissioned for the English Channel, under Captain George Wolfe in December 1802 and completed for sea service on 24 March 1803. A large press gang from Aigle, of more than 50 marines and sailors, led by Wolfe, put ashore at Portland on 2 April to capture men to supplement the crew. In what became known as the Easton Massacre, a scuffle broke out between the inhabitants and Wolfe's forces. Several civilians were shot and four were killed; sixteen members of the press gang received injuries. Nine were wounded so seriously they had to be discharged. Wolfe and three officers later stood trial for murder but were acquitted. Continuing to patrol in home waters with the Channel Fleet, Aigle shared in the prize money for a 40-gun French frigate, Franchise, taken on 28 May and six merchant vessels during the first week of June. Then, while off Vigo on 27 September, she captured a French privateer of 14 guns.

Aigle was part of a squadron blockading Brest when, on the morning of 25 March 1804, the 74-gun HMS Magnificent struck a reef. Aigle and other ships of the squadron closed in and removed most of the crew, and the remainder took to boats as the ship began to rapidly sink. Magnificent's entire crew survived, although one of the boats landed on the French coast where the 86 men aboard were taken prisoner.

Not far from the Cordouan Lighthouse, on 12 July, Aigle encountered two French ships, the ship-rigged Charente of 20 guns and the 8-gun brig Joie, out of Rochefort. (Note: Charente, under the command of Lieutenant Joseph Samson, carried 20 long 6-pounders, four swivels, and had a crew of 104 men. Joie was commanded by Lieutenant Benjamin Gadobert and was recorded as carrying eight 12-pounders. Naval historian William James thought this an error, and suggested that Joie's guns must either have been 8-pounders or carronades.) At 17:00 Aigle caught up with them. The French ships shortened sail and looked as if they were about to do battle but after discharging their guns, both ran aground. Many of the French sailors were drowned when the boats they were attempting to escape in were engulfed by the large waves. Unable to re-float the stranded ships due to the heavy swell; Wolfe ordered them destroyed, after taking off the survivors.

Boats from Aigle were sent after some small craft, seen in the early hours of 27 November in the Bay of Gibraltar. The resulting small-arms fire was heard by Captain Thomas Dundas in the nearby 36-gun HMS Naiad, who set off in the direction of the noise and discovered Aigle's boats battling a flotilla of Spanish gunboats. Naiad managed to capture two Spanish vessels and recover the boats and crew of Aigle intact and without loss of life.

On 15 December, Aigle accidentally ran down and sank the 12-gun HM hired armed schooner Gertrude off Ushant. Aigle picked up Gertrude′s crew. In January 1805, Aigle was rescuing sailors again after encountering the Danish vessel Frederica Dorothea, which had foundered while travelling from Bordeaux to London.

Temporary command of Aigle was given to Commander Henry Sturt in February but Wolfe was back in charge by 21 August, when Aigle encountered a small British squadron, under Captain John Tremayne Rodd, comprising the 44 and 38-gun frigates HMS Indefatigable and Niobe and three smaller vessels. Rodd had been shadowing the French fleet at Brest under Vice-Admiral Ganteaume, which had left the port the day before and was now at anchor between Camaret and Bertheaume. Shortly after her arrival, Rodd dispatched Aigle to update the commander-in-chief of the Channel Fleet, Admiral William Cornwallis of the situation.

Nine Spanish gunboats attacked Aigle in Vigo Bay on 28 September. For an hour she had to endure their fire before the wind got up and the previously becalmed Aigle was able to launch a counter-offensive; capturing one gunboat and driving the others away. Two chasse-marées were taken by the crew of Aigle, in a cutting-out expedition when they boarded the vessels from boats on 15 October 1807 and while cruising with the 32-gun HMS Pallas and 74-gun Gibraltar in December, she assisted with the capture of Spanish schooner Bueno Vista. A few days later, the same three ships took a French lugger and had more success in the first quarter of the following year, when four more chasse-marées were seized and a former British brig, Margaret was recaptured.

=== Action off Groix ===
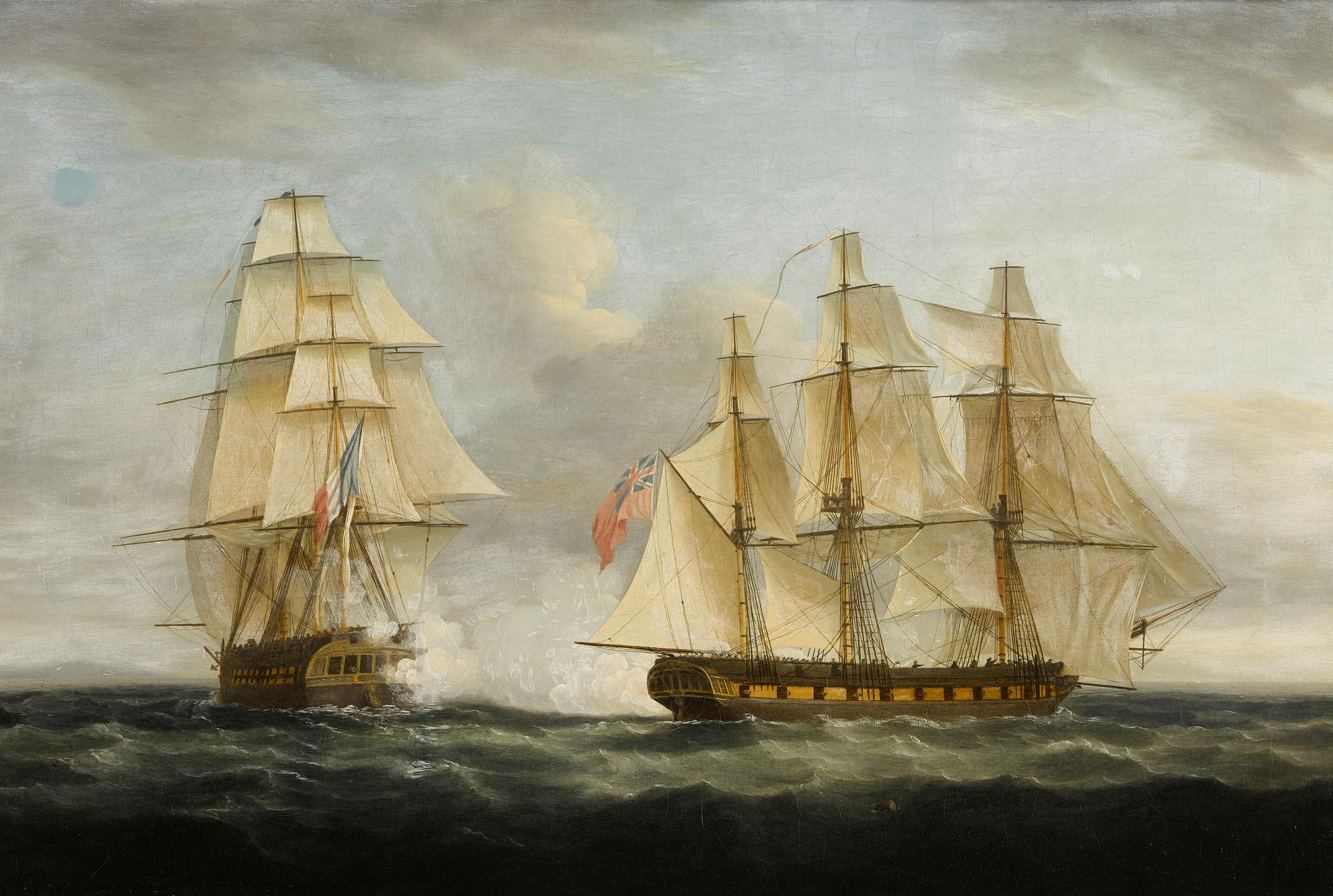
A painting by Thomas Whitcombe thought to be Aigle engaging with Le Sirene

Aigle was in action again on 22 March 1808 against two large, French frigates; Italienne of 40 guns and the 38-gun Sirene. A squadron comprising Aigle, the 32-gun frigate HMS Narcissus, the two seventy-fours HMS Impétueux and Saturn, and two or three smaller vessels were anchored between the Glénan islands, while being resupplied by a transport convoy. At 15:45, the two French frigates were simultaneously seen to the south-east from Aigle's masthead and by the 4-gun British schooner HMS Cuckoo, which was stationed midway between the squadron and the island of Groix. Aigle immediately gave chase, and coming within hailing distance at 19:30, Wolfe directed Cuckoo to relay to Impétueux and Narcissus, now following two miles behind, his intention to cut off the French ships by sailing between Groix and the mainland.

An hour later, having endured the fire of the guns on both shores, Aigle was in a position to attack the rear-most frigate of the pair as they emerged from the western side of the island. This frigate sought the shelter of Groix' batteries, so Aigle set off in pursuit of the other which was now making for Lorient. As it was now dark, Aigle displayed a blue light to indicate her position to the closing Impétueux, and at 21:00, coming within 50 yards, exchanged fire with the Frenchman. To prevent a boarding, which Wolfe was determined upon, the frigate came about and, shortly after the British had broken off their attack for lack of sea room, ran aground on the Pointe de Chats on the eastern edge of Groix.

Saturn, Narcissus and Cuckoo joined Aigle and Impétueux during the night and the following morning at dawn, the five British ships returned to the island but no further attempt was made on either of the French frigates. Six days later the stranded ship was re-floated and both vessels arrived safely in Lorient. (Note: It is not recorded which French frigate was Italienne and which was Sirène but James postulates that after, as the latter only went to sea either as an armée en flute or store-ship, it seems likely it was the stranded vessel.)

=== Battle of Basque Roads ===
Map illustrating the position of Aigle off the Boyart Shoal shortly before the British attack on the night of 11 April

In 1809, Aigle was part of the Channel Fleet under Admiral James Gambier and back chasing merchantmen; securing five in January and February. In April she fought at the Battle of the Basque Roads. The French ships were anchored under the protection of the powerful batteries on the Isle d'Aix when on 11 April Captain Thomas Cochrane led an attacking force of fireships and explosive vessels. Just before the attack, Aigle took up a position just north-east of the Boyart Shoal; anchored behind the 38-gun HMS Imperieuse, and ahead of the 32-gun HMS Unicorn and Pallas. It was the job of these four frigates to take on board the returning fireship crews and give assistance to the escorting boats, if required. The fireships had a partial success; the French, having anticipated such an attack, had rigged a boom across the channel. One of the explosive vessels breached the boom, leading the French to cut their cables and drift on to the shoals.

The following day, after much delay, Gambier took the rest of his fleet into the Basque Roads. To present their broadsides, the British ships anchored with springs, (Note: A spring was a second rope attached to the anchor cable so that by pulling on it, the ship could be slewed round contrary to wind and tide, which would otherwise determine the angle of the vessel.) around the stranded French, and exchanged fire. Aigle took up a position, second in line behind Unicorn, and just ahead of the 36-gun frigate HMS Emerald and Indefatigable. These ships directed their fire mainly towards the French ships of the line Ville de Varsovie of 80 guns and 74-gun Aquilon, both of which struck their colours at around 17:30. (Note: A ship's "colours", a national flag or battle ensign, are hauled down from her mast, or "struck", to indicate that the ship has surrendered.)

On 14 April Cochrane was called to Gambier's flagship and was replaced in command of the attack by Wolfe aboard Aigle. By this time, a portion of the French fleet had made its way up the Charente, where it had become stranded. A fresh attack was ordered, utilising the bomb-ketch HMS Aetna and four gun-brigs partly armed with the 18-pounders from Aigle, there being insufficient depth of water for the British frigates. Attacks continued on the French fleet until 29 April when the last assailable enemy ship, the 74-gun Regulus got free and escaped upriver. The crew of Aigle would later receive a share of the prize money for the enemy vessels captured or destroyed during the battle.

=== Walcheren Campaign ===
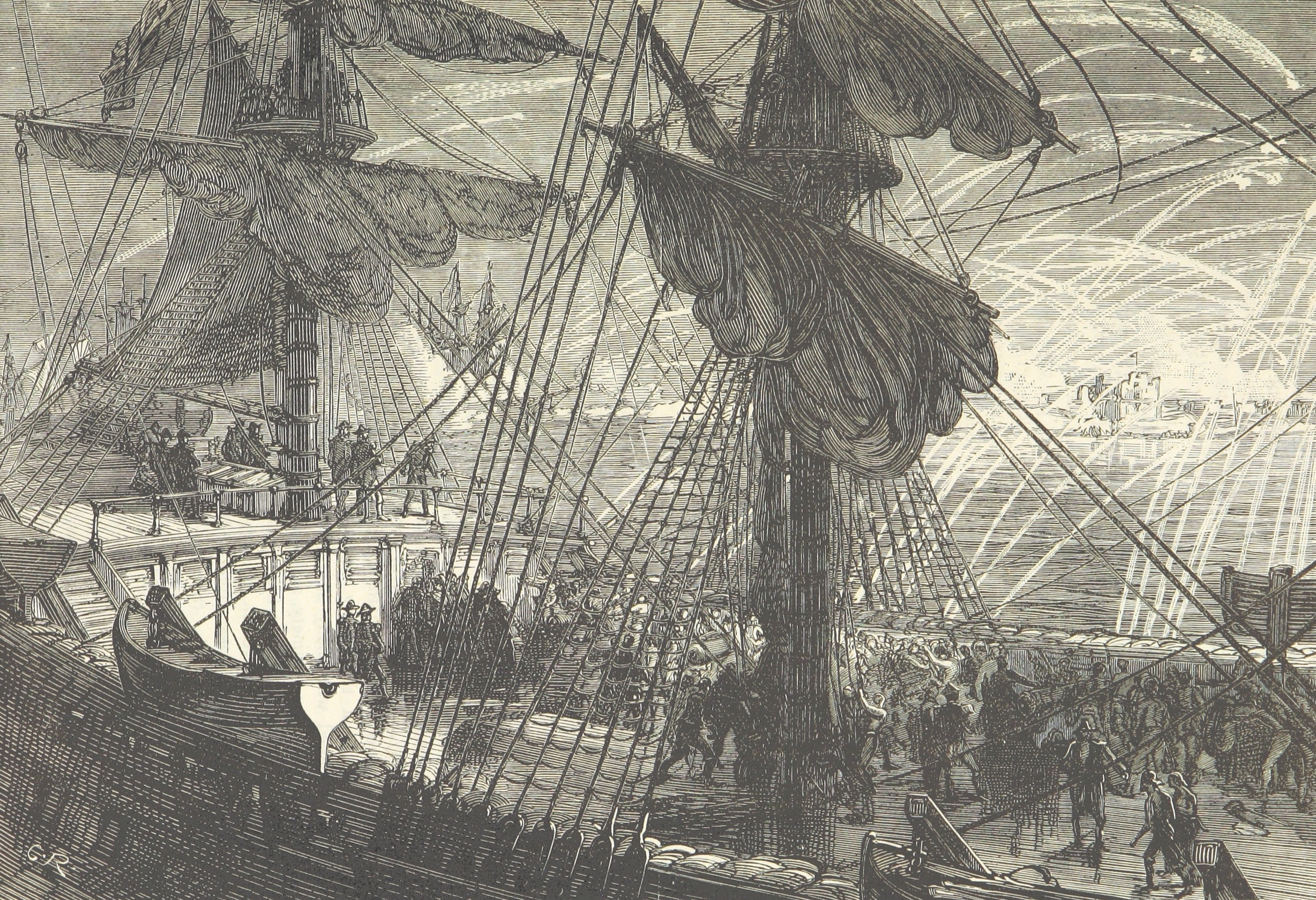
The bombardment of Flushing, which Aigle participated in

In the latter half of 1809, Aigle was part of a large force sent against the French-controlled Kingdom of Holland. Comprising more than 600 vessels and nearly 40,000 troops, the expedition left The Downs on 28 July, intent on destroying the dockyards and arsenals at Antwerp, Terneuse and Flushing, and capturing the French fleet stationed in the river Scheldt.

Troops were landed on the Island of Walcheren at 16:30 on 30 July, while bomb vessels and gunboats began a bombardment of Veere. The town surrendered immediately but it took several days of fighting before the fort was captured on 1 August. The British then mounted an attack on Flushing, and the island of Zuid-Beveland that was taken unopposed, the forts there having been deserted. The British neglected Cadzand on the south-west side of the Scheldt, where more than 5,700 French troops crossed the river to reinforce Flushing. The capitulation of Fort Rammekens allowed the British to besiege the town on 3 August and to prevent further aid being sent, a flotilla of gunboats was dispatched to the western arm of the Scheldt, to cut it off on the seaward side. The British then began locating and marking a channel for larger ships on 6 August.

Poor weather delayed operations and it was not until 11 August that a large squadron under Captain Lord William Stuart, of ten frigates, including Aigle, was eventually able to make its way up the western passage. The British ships endured fire from batteries on both sides of the river for more than two hours and Aigle, in the centre, had her stern frame shattered when a shell fell through the deck and exploded, killing a marine and wounding four other members of the crew. She was the only ship to suffer any damage and her casualties amounted to almost half the total of two killed and nine wounded. (Note: The other ships in this squadron were; the 40-gun Lavinia, the 32-gun Heroine, the 36-gun Amethyst, the 38-gun Rota, Nymphen and Euryalus, both of 36 guns, the 38-gun Statira, the 36-gun Dryad, and the 38-gun Perlen. They sailed up river in that order with Aigle between Nymphen and Euryalus.)

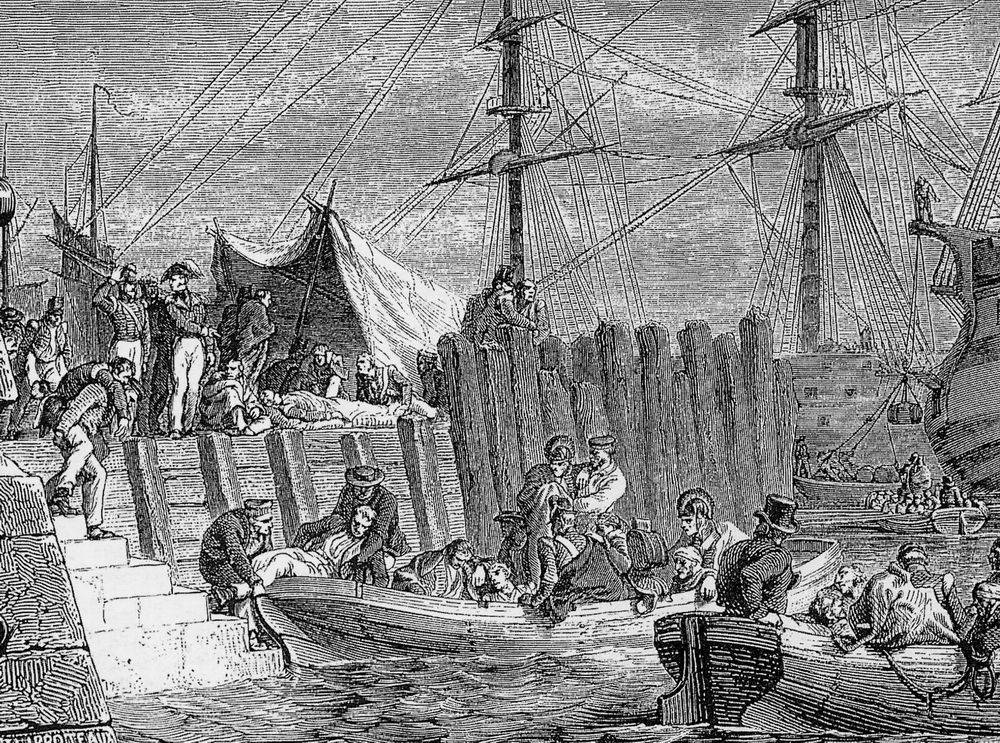
Sick troops being evacuated from Walcheren on 30 August 1809

A two-day long bombardment of Flushing from both land and sea forced its capitulation on 15 August. Ratified the following day, it left the British in control of Walcheren, which they garrisoned with 10,000 troops. Schouwen and Duiveland on the Eastern branch of the Scheldt, were occupied peacefully on 17 August. The French fleet had already withdrawn to Antwerp, having been informed on 29 July when the British were still at sea. Between the British and their objective were now more than 35,000 French soldiers, garrisoned in heavily armed forts at Lillo, Liefkenshoech, and Antwerp. The deliberate destruction of dykes by the French had led to widespread flooding, and with disease spreading through the British army, it was decided to abandon the expedition in early September. Aigle's crew received a share of the prize money for its part in the campaign.

On 12 September 1810, while on an independent cruise some 400 miles north of the Azores, Aigle encountered a strange sail heading towards her. When 9 nmi (17 km) away, the vessel suddenly changed course. Aigle gave chase, following her for 13 hours over 134 nmi (248 km) of open water, averaging just over 10 knots (12 mph; 19 km/h). The quarry sailed on every point of the wind in her attempt to shake off her pursuer, and might have succeeded if it were not for a sudden gale which gave Aigle the wind she needed to catch up. The vessel turned out to be Phoenix, a French brig armed with eighteen 18 pdr (8.2 kg) carronades, sailing under a letter of marque with an experienced crew of 129 and a decorated captain. She had set out from Bordeaux 50 days previous and had been successfully preying on British and American shipping.

=== Mediterranean service ===
Captain Sir John Louis was appointed to Aigle in October 1811 and took her to the Mediterranean in November. Aigle and the 36-gun frigate, HMS Curacoa, used boats to land marines and seamen near the harbour of Campo del Porto, Elba, on 20 June 1813. When the batteries protecting the town were over-run and the troops there routed, the French scuttled three of their own ships to prevent them from becoming prizes. The following morning, having returned to the boats, the marines captured a small convoy of three settees and drove the brig protecting them into Portoferraio. Two large feluccas were taken from the town of Mesca in the Gulf of Spezia, on 28 June. Prevented by the wind from using the ships, the British once more took to boats but only succeeded in driving their quarry inshore. Later that evening the wind changed direction and Aigle and Curacoa were able to bombard the town while marines took the feluccas from the beach.

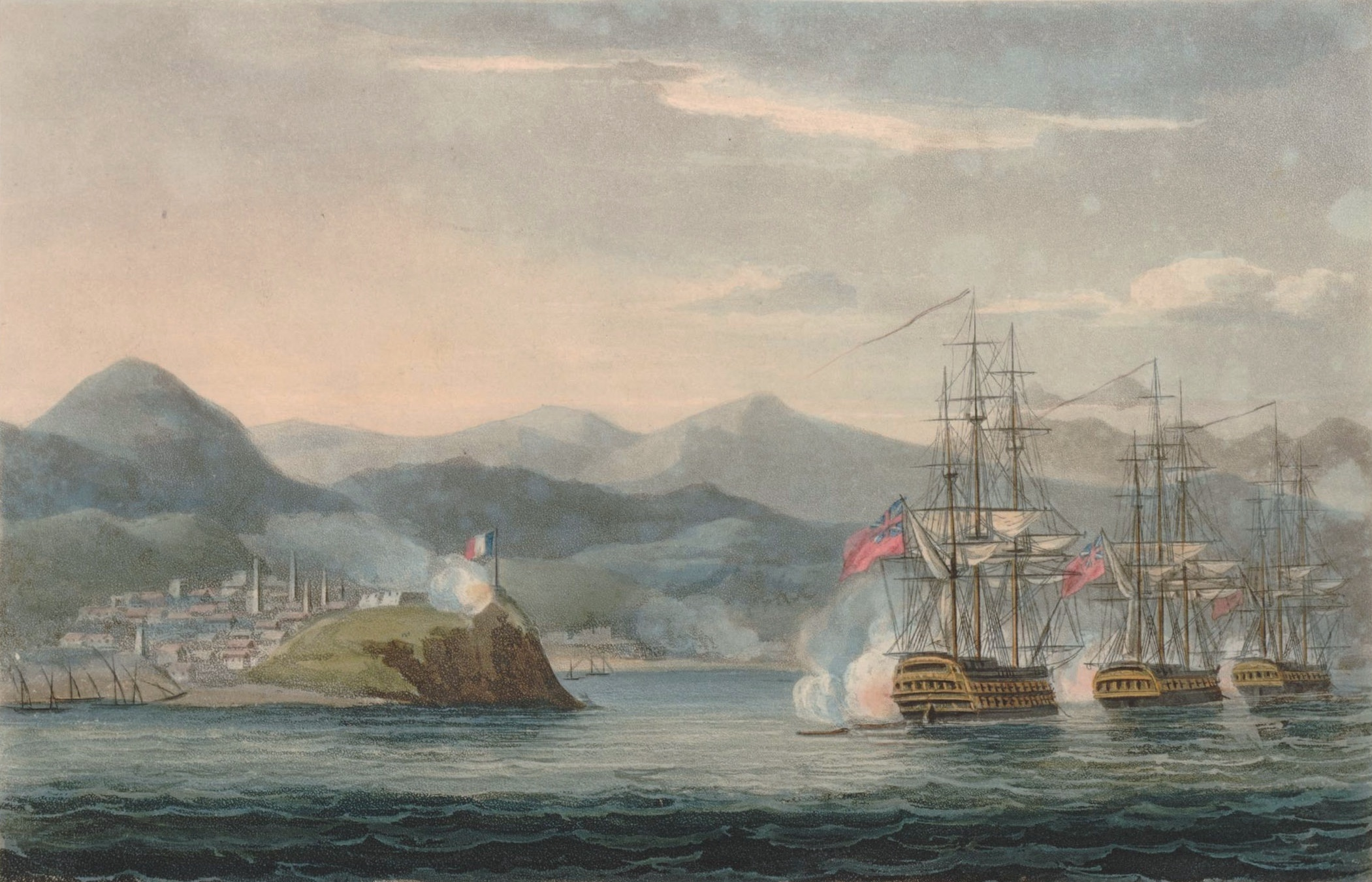
Pembroke, Alcmene and Aigle bombarding Fort Maurizio on 11 April 1814

Aigle returned home in the latter half of 1813 and paid off but returned in time to assist in the capture of four merchant vessels and the cargoes of 15 others with the 74-gun HMS Pembroke and the 44-gun HMS Alcmene, in the Gulf of Genoa, on 11 April 1814. After driving the 20-strong convoy ashore, the British three-ship squadron, under the command of Captain Sir James Brisbane, was obliged to fire on Fort Maurizio until its guns were silenced before the prizes could be collected. The remaining vessels could not be taken off, having been scuttled by their crews, and so were destroyed. When a joint British and Sicilian army under Lord William Bentinck occupied the city of Genoa eight days later, Aigle was sent to provide naval support as part of the Mediterranean fleet under Vice-Admiral Sir Edward Pellew.

== Post-war service and fate ==
Aigle was re-rated as a 42-gun frigate in February 1817 and underwent repairs and alterations at Woolwich from March. This was a substantial amount of work that cost £36,427 and took until May 1819, after which she was laid up. In accordance with Surveyor of the Navy Sir Robert Seppings' designs, in January 1820, Aigle had her square transom removed and a circular stern fitted. This gave her improved protection in the rear and allowed a better field of fire. She was subsequently laid up once more, then repaired and converted to a sixth-rate 24-gun corvette of 990 tons burthen, at Chatham Dockyard between March and July 1831. Recommissioned on 23 August 1841 under Captain Lord Clarence Paget, she was fitted out for sea then sent to the Mediterranean in November. Aigle returned home under Paget in the latter half of 1845 and paid off on 30 August.

Aigle was taken to Woolwich in October 1852 where she was converted to a dual-purpose coal hulk and receiving ship. She moved to Sheerness in September 1869. On 15 August 1870, the Admiralty designated her as a target for torpedoes and on 8 October, she was sunk off the Isle of Grain, Kent by HMS Oberon. Aigle was sold for £925 in November and later, salvaged and broken up.

== Prizes ==
Vessels captured or destroyed for which Aigle's crew received full or partial credit (Note: Does not include prizes taken in fleet actions or campaigns where Aigle's crew were not directly involved)
Date	Ship	Nationality	Type	Fate	Ref.
28 May 1803	Franchise	French	Frigate	Captured	
31 May - 7 June 1803	Sapho	French	Merchantman	Captured	
31 May - 7 June 1803	Augustina	French	Merchantman	Captured	
31 May - 7 June 1803	Amitie	French	Merchantman	Captured	
31 May - 7 June 1803	Maria Rose	French	Merchantman	Captured	
31 May - 7 June 1803	Hercule	French	Merchantman	Captured	
31 May - 7 June 1803	Dame Chenie	French	Merchantman	Captured	
28 September 1803	Alerte	French	Privateer (14 guns)	Captured	
12 July 1804	Charante	French	Corvette (20 guns)	Destroyed	
12 July 1804	Joie	French	Brig (8 guns)	Destroyed	
28 September 1805	No. 3	Spanish	Gunboat	Destroyed	
18 April 1806	Jonge Brouwer	Prussian	Not recorded	Detained	
16 March 1807	Margaret	French	Brig	Captured	
7 December 1807	Bueno Vista	Spanish	Schooner	Captured	
19 December 1807	Adile	French	Lugger	Captured	
26 December 1807	Othello	Not recorded	Not recorded	Captured	
17 January 1808	Charles	French	Chasse-marée	Captured	
20 February 1808	Sainte Anna	French	Chasse-marée	Captured	
11 April 1808	Caroline	French	Chasse-marée	Captured	
11 April 1808	Sainte Anne	French	Chasse-marée	Captured	
14 April 1808	Marie Sainte Anne	French	Chasse-marée	Captured	
22 May 1808	Jeune Adele	French	Chasse-marée	Captured	
1 January 1809	Paix	French	Not recorded	Captured	
7 February 1809	Prudent	French	Brig	Captured	
16 February 1809	Friendship	Not recorded	Not recorded	Captured	
16 February 1809	Anna Christina	Not recorded	Not recorded	Captured	
23 February 1809	Six Freres	French	Brig	Captured	
11 - 12 April 1809	Aquilon	French	Ship-of-the-line (74 guns)	Destroyed	
11 - 12 April 1809	Ville de Varsovie	French	Ship-of-the-line (80 guns)	Destroyed	
11 - 12 April 1809	Calcutta	French	Ship-of-the-line (56 guns)	Destroyed	
11 - 12 April 1809	Tonnere	French	Ship-of-the-line (74 guns)	Destroyed	
11 - 12 April 1809	Indienne	French	Frigate (44 guns)	Destroyed	
7 May 1809	Eleanora	French	Brig	Captured	
12 September 1810	Phoenix	French	Privateer (18 guns)	Captured	
11 April 1814	Fortunee	French	Not recorded	Captured	
11 April 1814	Notre Dame Leusainte	French	Not recorded	Captured	
11 April 1814	Not recorded	Not recorded	Settee	Captured	
18 February 1815	Cossack	Not recorded	Schooner	Captured	
