= HMS Cuckoo =

Four ships of the Royal Navy have borne the name HMS Cuckoo, after the cuckoo, a family of birds:

- HMS Cuckoo (1806) was a 4-gun schooner launched in 1806 and wrecked in 1810.
- HMS Cuckoo (1837) was a wooden paddle packet launched in 1822 as the GPO vessel Cinderella. She was transferred to the navy in 1837, was used as a tug from 1861 and was sold in 1864.
- HMS Cuckoo (1873) was an Ant-class iron screw gunboat launched in 1873. She became a base ship in 1912 and was renamed HMS Vivid. She was renamed HMS Vivid (Old) in 1920 and YC37 in 1923. She was sold in 1958.
- HMS Cuckoo was a coastguard vessel launched in 1869 as HMS Hawk. She was renamed HMS Amelia in 1888 as a coastguard gunboat. She was renamed HMS Colleen in 1905, HMS Colleen Old in 1916, and HMS Emerald and then HMS Cuckoo in 1918. She was sold in 1922.
