= List of shipwrecks in May 1850 =

The following ships were sunk, foundered, wrecked, grounded, or otherwise lost during May 1850.

== 1 May ==
List of shipwrecks: 1 May 1850
Ship	State	Description
Champlain	United States	The ship was wrecked on the Bahama Banks. She was on a voyage from New York to New Orleans, Louisiana.
Commerce	(United Kingdom of Great Britain and Ireland) British North America	The steamship collided with the steamship Dispatch (United States) and sank in Lake Erie with the loss of 38 lives. She was on a voyage from Montreal to Port Stanley, Province of Canada
Fanny	United Kingdom	The ship ran aground at Helsingør, Denmark. She was on a voyage from Liverpool, Lancashire to Helsingør. She was refloated.
Hetty Clifton	United Kingdom	The ship was in collision with HMS Simoom (Royal Navy) and foundered in the Irish Sea off Calf of Man, Isle of Man. Her crew were rescued.
William Packet	United Kingdom	The ship ran aground at Helsingør. She was on a voyage from Newcastle upon Tyne, Northumberland to Helsingør. She was refloated.

== 2 May ==
List of shipwrecks: 2 May 1850
Ship	State	Description
Mary Ann	United Kingdom	The ship foundered in the English Channel 14 nautical miles (26 km) south west of The Needles, Isle of Wight. Her crew were rescued by Bordeaux (United Kingdom). She was on a voyage from Teignmouth, Devon to London.
Neptune	United Kingdom	The ship was driven ashore in the Saint Lawrence River. All on board were rescued. She broke up the next day.

== 3 May ==
List of shipwrecks: 3 May 1850
Ship	State	Description
Alida	Netherlands	The ship ran aground and was wrecked off Texel, North Holland. She was on a voyage from Christiansand, Norway to Harlingen, Friesland.
Franciscus	France	The barque was wrecked at "La Plaza de Castillos". She was on a voyage from Rio de Janeiro, Brazil to Buenos Aires, Argentina.
Lady Rowley	United Kingdom	The ship was driven ashore and wrecked at Faial Island, Azores with the loss of all but her captain.
Paul Pry	United Kingdom	The ship was driven ashore and wrecked at Faial Island with the loss of all but two of her crew.
Rocket	United Kingdom	The ship ran aground on the Barber Sand, in the North Sea off the coast of Norfolk. She was refloated.

== 4 May ==
List of shipwrecks: 4 May 1850
Ship	State	Description
Betsey Millar	United Kingdom	The ship was wrecked on the Sillycars Rocks, off the coast of Northumberland. Her crew were rescued. She was on a voyage from Seaham, County Durham to Arbroath, Forfarshire.
Clara	(United Kingdom of Great Britain and Ireland) New South Wales	The schooner was wrecked at Sydney.
David	(United Kingdom of Great Britain and Ireland) New South Wales	The schooner was wrecked at Sydney.
Endeavour	United Kingdom	The ship was driven ashore and wrecked at Saltfleet, Lincolnshire. Her crew were rescued. She was on a voyage from Goole, Yorkshire to Wisbech, Cambridgeshire.
Guua	United Kingdom	The East Indiaman was lost near Madras, India when struck by a sudden violent squall while at anchor, and was driven ashore and wrecked without loss of life.
Mazeppa	United Kingdom	The ship sank in the Grand Banks of Newfoundland. Her crew were rescued. She was on a voyage from Sunderland, County Durham to New York, United States.
Star	United Kingdom	The sloop sprang a leak and foundered 20 nautical miles (37 km) off Saint Vincent with the loss of three of the twelve people on board. She was on a voyage from Saint Vincent to Barbados.
Sulimary	United Kingdom	The East Indiaman Sulimary was lost near Madras when struck by a sudden violent squall while at anchor, and was driven ashore and wrecked with the loss of over 73 lives including the captain and his wife.

== 5 May ==
List of shipwrecks: June 1850
Ship	State	Description
Acorn	United Kingdom	The ship was sunk by ice in the Atlantic Ocean 30 nautical miles (56 km) off Saint John's, Newfoundland, British North America. Her crew were rescued by the schooner, Blessing (United Kingdom).
Conservator	United Kingdom	The ship was sunk by ice in the Atlantic Ocean off the Bird Islands. Her crew were rescued. She was on a voyage from Liverpool, Lancashire to Montreal, Province of Canada, British North America.
Havana Packet	Belgium	The ship was wrecked on the Pickle Reef, off the coast of Florida, United States. Her crew were rescued. She was on a voyage from Havana, Cuba to Antwerp.
Ostensible	United Kingdom	The ship was sunk by ice in the Atlantic Ocean. All on board were rescued by Duke (United Kingdom). Ostensible was on a voyage from Liverpool, Lancashire to Quebec City, Province of Canada, British North America.

== 6 May ==
List of shipwrecks: 6 May 1850
Ship	State	Description
Aurora	Spain	The ship was wrecked 8 nautical miles (15 km) south of Porto, Portugal. Her crew were rescued. She was on a voyage from Liverpool, Lancashire, United Kingdom to Seville and Cádiz.
Highland Lad	United Kingdom	The ship ran aground at the entrance to the Gulf of Smyrna. She was on a voyage from London to Smyrna, Ottoman Empire.
Horatio	United Kingdom	The brig foundered in the Atlantic Ocean off Cape St. Mary's, Portugal. Her crew were rescued by Charles William (United Kingdom). Horatio was on a voyage from Salonica, Greece to Belfast, County Antrim.
Invincible	United Kingdom	The ship was driven ashore in the Currituck Inlet. She was on a voyage from Newport, Monmouthshire to Baltimore, Maryland, United States. She was refloated on 15 May but was driven ashore again. She was refloated on 5 June and taken in to Norfolk, Virginia, United States.
Jules	France	The ship was lost near Port-Vendres, Pyrénées-Orientales.
Prosper	France	The ship ran aground and capsized at the mouth of the Loire. Her crew were rescued. She was on a voyage from Dunkirk, Nord to Nantes, Loire-Inférieure.
Rosina	United Kingdom	The ship foundered off Cape St. Vincent. Portugal. Her crew were rescued by Leander (United Kingdom). Rosina was on a voyage from Cartagena, Spain to Newcastle upon Tyne, Northumberland.
Why Not?	United Kingdom	The ship was abandoned in the Atlantic Ocean. Her crew were rescued by Thames (United Kingdom). Why Not? was on a voyage from the Canary Islands to Belfast, County Antrim.
William	United Kingdom	The ship ran aground on the Peverel Ledge, in the English Channel off the coast of Dorset. She was refloated on 10 May and taken in to Swanage, Dorset in a severely damaged condition.

== 7 May ==
List of shipwrecks: 7 May 1850
Ship	State	Description
Adventure	United Kingdom	The brig was wrecked off Harwich, Essex. Her crew survived. She was on a voyage from Newcastle upon Tyne, Northumberland to London.
Bure	United Kingdom	The ship ran aground on the Corton Sand, in the North Sea off the coast of Suffolk. She was on a voyage from London to Warkworth, Northumberland. Bure was refloated and taken in to Lowestoft, Suffolk. NC100550/>
Earl of Durham	United Kingdom	The troopship was driven ashore at Brook, Isle of Wight. She was on a voyage from London to Halifax, Nova Scotia, British North America. She was refloated the next day and taken in to Portsmouth, Hampshire.
Isabella and Margaret	United Kingdom	The ship ran aground in the Great Belt. She was on a voyage from Odense, Denmark to an English port. She was refloated and put in to Kleven Havn, Ommel, Denmark for repairs.
Johns	United Kingdom	The ship was driven ashore at Bridlington, Yorkshire. Her crew were rescued. She was on a voyage from Boulogne-sur-Mer, Pas-de-Calais, France to Sunderland, County Durham. She was refloated on 10 May but sank whilst being taken in to Bridlington.
London	United Kingdom	The brig was driven ashore at Great Yarmouth, Norfolk.
Mariana	Bremen	The ship ran aground at Bremerhaven.
Mary	Malta	The ship was driven ashore 2 leagues (6 nautical miles (11 km) east of Adra, Spain. Her crew were rescued. She was on a voyage from Liverpool, Lancashire to Smyrna, Ottoman Empire. She subsequently floated off and was discovered at sea on 15 May by HMS Janus (Royal Navy).
Teniers	Belgium	The schooner was wrecked on the Goodwin Sands, Kent, United Kingdom with the loss of a crew member. She was on a voyage from Antwerp to Rio de Janeiro, Brazil.
Worcester	United Kingdom	The ship struck the quayside at Hull, Yorkshire and forced her anchor through her bow. She was consequently beached. She was on a voyage from Bombay, India to Hull.

== 8 May ==
List of shipwrecks: 8 May 1850
Ship	State	Description
Earl of Durham	United Kingdom	The ship was driven ashore at Brook, Isle of Wight. She was on a voyage from London to Halifax, Nova Scotia, British North America. She was refloated and taken in to Cowes, Isle of Wight.
Eleonora	(United Kingdom of Great Britain and Ireland) British North America	The schooner struck a rock and sank off Cap-Santé, Province of Canada. Her crew were rescued.
Empress	United Kingdom	The ship struck a rock off Perth, Swan River Colony and was damaged. She put back to Perth for repairs.
Gleaner	United Kingdom	The ship was driven ashore in the Hudson River.
Jane Lockhart	United States	The ship foundered in the Mediterranean Sea off Alboran Island, Spain. Her crew were rescued. She was on a voyage from Adra, Spain to New York.
William and Henry	United Kingdom	The ship was wrecked on the Goodwin Sands, Kent. She was on a voyage from Hull, Yorkshire to Exeter, Devon.

== 9 May ==
List of shipwrecks: 9 May 1850
Ship	State	Description
Ellen	United Kingdom	The schooner was wrecked on Anglesey. Her five crew were rescued by the lifeboat № 6 (United Kingdom).
Latona	United Kingdom	The ship was driven ashore at Peterhead, Aberdeenshire. Her crew were rescued. She was on a voyage from Peterhead to Sunderland, County Durham.

== 10 May ==
List of shipwrecks: 10 May 1850
Ship	State	Description
Ann	United Kingdom	The barque was sunk by ice 15 nautical miles (28 km) north east of the Magdalen Islands, Nova Scotia, British North America. Her crew were rescued by William (United Kingdom).
Harvest	United Kingdom	The ship was wrecked at Cape Negro, Nova Scotia, British North America. Her crew were rescued. She was on a voyage from Sunderland, County Durham to Saint John, New Brunswick, British North America.
Hibernia	United Kingdom	The ship was sunk by ice in the Green Bank, in the Atlantic Ocean. Her crew were rescued by Jane Lowden (United Kingdom). Hibernia was on a voyage from Glasgow, Renfrewshire to Quebec City, Province of Canada, British North America.
Perseverance	United Kingdom	The ship caught fire whilst on a voyage from Cork to Glasgow. She was beached at Kilkeel, County Down and was severely damaged.

== 11 May ==
List of shipwrecks: 11 May 1850
Ship	State	Description
Annie	Netherlands	The ship was driven ashore on Goose Island, Nova Scotia, British North America. She was on a voyage from the Netherlands to Boston, Massachusetts, United States. She had been refloated and taken in to Halifax, Nova Scotia by 16 August.
Britannia	United Kingdom	The ship sank on the Hoft, in the Baltic Sea. Her crew were rescued by Dalston (United Kingdom).
Brothers	United Kingdom	The brig ran aground and was damaged at L'Orient, Morbihan, France. She was on a voyage from London to L'Orient and Quebec City, Province of Canada, British North America.
Charles Saunders	United Kingdom	The ship was driven ashore near Halifax, Nova Scotia, British North America. She was on a voyage from New Orleans, Louisiana, United States to Quebec City. She was refloated on 14 May and taken in to Spry Harbour, Nova Scotia.
Hinda	United Kingdom	The barque was driven ashore and wrecked near Corsewall Point, Wigtownshire. Her crew were rescued. She was on a voyage from Glasgow, Renfrewshire to Demerara, British Guiana.
Josephine	United Kingdom	The ship was crushed by ice and sank between Bolderāja and Domesnes, Russia. Her crew were rescued.
Northumberland	United Kingdom	The ship was wrecked at White Point, British North America. She was on a voyage from Boston, Massachusetts, United States to Quebec City.
Nymph	United Kingdom	The ship ran aground on a reef in the Ragged Islands, China. She was on a voyage from Shanghai, China to Hong Kong. She was refloated and put back to Shanghai.
Scud	(United Kingdom of Great Britain and Ireland) New South Wales	The ketch departed from Newcastle for Sydney. Subsequently foundered with the loss of all hands, a boat washed up at Putty.

== 12 May ==
List of shipwrecks: 12 May 1850
Ship	State	Description
Active, and Thetis	United Kingdom	The brigs were in collision off the coast of Norfolk and were severely damaged. Active was on a voyage from Hartlepool, County Durham to London. She put in to Great Yarmouth. Thetis was beached at Caister-on-Sea She was refloated on 18 May and taken in to Great Yarmouth.
Ann Semple	United Kingdom	The ship was sunk by ice off the coast of Newfoundland, British North America. She was on a voyage from Liverpool, Lancashire to Newfoundland.
Josephine	United Kingdom	The ship ran aground at Tralee, County Kerry.
Magician	United Kingdom	The ship ran aground on a reef in the Mona Passage. She was on a voyage from La Guaira, Venezuela to Hamburg. She was refloated and resumed her voyage.
Partisan	United Kingdom	The ship sank in the Baltic Sea 12 nautical miles (22 km) east south east of Hogland, Russia. Her crew were rescued by Dalston (United Kingdom).

== 13 May ==
List of shipwrecks: 13 May 1850
Ship	State	Description
Queen	United Kingdom	The steamship ran aground at Liverpool, Lancashire. She was on a voyage from Genoa, Kingdom of Sardinia to Liverpool. she was refloated.

== 14 May ==
List of shipwrecks: 14 May 1850
Ship	State	Description
Harbinger	United Kingdom	The brig sprang a leak and foundered north of Vigo, Spain. Her six crew survived. She was on a voyage from Pernambuco, Brazil to Falmouth, Cornwall.
Olga	United Kingdom	The barque was driven ashore and wrecked on Long Island, New York, United States. She was on a voyage from Sunderland, County Durham to Newhaven, Connecticut, United States.
Rowena	United Kingdom	The ship sprang a leak and sank in the Irish Sea 12 nautical miles (22 km) off Corsewall Point, Wigtownshire. Her crew were rescued. She was on a voyage from Ardrossan, Ayrshire to Runcorn, Cheshire.

== 15 May ==
List of shipwrecks: 15 May 1850
Ship	State	Description
Alfred	United Kingdom	The ship ran aground and was damaged at Wells-next-the-Sea, Norfolk. She was on a voyage from Middlesbrough, Yorkshire to Wells-next-the-Sea. She was refloated on 23 May.
HMS Cuckoo	Royal Navy	The paddle steamer stuck a sunken rock and sank at Victoria Harbour, Jersey, Channel Islands. All on board survived. She had been refloated by 19 May and taken in to Portsmouth, Hampshire, where she was repaired and returned to service.
Margaret	United Kingdom	The ship was holed by ice and sank off Hogland, Russia. Her crew were rescued. She was on a voyage from Liverpool, Lancashire to Kronstadt, Russia.

== 16 May ==
List of shipwrecks: 16 May 1850
Ship	State	Description
Dunottar Castle	United Kingdom	The brig ran aground off Shoeburyness, Essex. She was later refloated.
Elizabeth and Sarah	United Kingdom	The schooner sprang a leak and foundered 6 nautical miles (11 km) south of the Manacles. Her crew were rescued She was on a voyage from Plymouth, Devon to Falmouth, Cornwall and Swansea, Glamorgan.
Emerald	(United Kingdom of Great Britain and Ireland) Guernsey	The smack ran aground and sank on the Gore Sands, in the Bristol Channel off the coast of Somerset. She was on a voyage from Bridgwater, Somerset to Guernsey. Emerald was refloated the next day, and towed in to Bridgwater on 19 May in a severely damaged condition.

== 17 May ==
List of shipwrecks: 17 May 1850
Ship	State	Description
Emerald	United Kingdom	The ship ran aground on the Gore Sands, in the Bristol Channel. She was on a voyage from Bridgwater, Somerset to Guernsey, Channel Islands. She was refloated the next day and towed in to Bridgwater.
Premier	United Kingdom	The ship was driven ashore at Valencia, Spain. She was on a voyage from London to Valencia.
Weatherall	United Kingdom	The schooner was wrecked at Salé, Morocco. Her crew were rescued.

== 18 May ==
List of shipwrecks: 18 May 1850
Ship	State	Description
Barkley	United Kingdom	The ship ran aground on the Lemon and Ower Sand, in the North Sea. She was on a voyage from Uddevalla, Sweden to Harwich, Essex. She was refloated and put in to Harwich, Essex in a leaky condition.
Bryan Abbs	United Kingdom	The ship was abandoned in the Atlantic Ocean. Her crew were rescued by the schooner Devon (United Kingdom). Bryan Abbs was on a voyage from New York, United States to Limerick.
Premier	United Kingdom	The ship was driven ashore and damaged at Valencia, Spain. She was refloated on 21 May.
Scipio	United Kingdom	The schooner foundered off Vigo, Spain. Her crew were rescued.

== 19 May ==
List of shipwrecks: 19 May 1850
Ship	State	Description
Deva	Denmark	The ship ran aground at "Saken". She was on a voyage from Kjerteminde to London, United Kingdom. She was refloated and taken in to Frederikshaven in a leaky condition.
Fame	United Kingdom	The ship ran aground on the Olinda Bank, off Pernambuco, Brazil. She was on a voyage from Pernambuco to Maceió, Brazil. She was refloated and resumed her voyage.
Jane	United Kingdom	The ship foundered off Cape St. Vincent, Portugal. Her crew were rescued by Brilliant (United Kingdom). Jane was on a voyage from "Ivica" to Quebec City, Province of Canada, British North America.
Maria	United Kingdom	The ship ran aground at Teignmouth, Devon. She was on a voyage from Teignmouth to Newport, Monmouthshire.

== 20 May ==
List of shipwrecks: May 1850
Ship	State	Description
Mary Ann	United Kingdom	The fishing smack was driven ashore at New Romney, Kent.
Minx	United Kingdom	The schooner was driven ashore at New Romney. She was on a voyage from London to Newport, Monmouthshire and Gibraltar.
Rose	United Kingdom	The schooner ran aground at Portishead, Somerset. She was on a voyage from Bristol, Gloucestershire to Milford Haven, Pembrokeshire.
Syren	United Kingdom	The ship departed from Trieste for a British port. No further trace, presumed foundered with the loss of all hands.

== 21 May ==
List of shipwrecks: 21 May 1850
Ship	State	Description
Deborah	United Kingdom	The ship ran aground on the Scroby Sands, Norfolk. She was on a voyage from Sunderland, County Durham to Mistley, Essex. She was refloated the next day and taken in to Great Yarmouth, Norfolk in a leaky condition.
Jeanne d'Arc	United Kingdom	The ship was driven ashore at Cromer, Norfolk. Her crew were rescued She was on a voyage from Newcastle upon Tyne, Northumberland, United Kingdom to Marsaille, Bouches-du-Rhône.
Nereid	United Kingdom	The ship ran aground on the Haisborough Sands, in the North Sea off the coast of Norfolk. Her crew were rescued. She was on a voyage from Hartlepool, County Durham to London.
Superb	United States	The ship ran aground at Mobile, Alabama. She was on a voyage from Mobile to Rochefort, Charente-Maritime, France. She put back to Mobile and was consequently condemned.
William Ernst	Netherlands	The ship ran aground on the Goodwin Sands, Kent, United Kingdom. She was on a voyage from Amsterdam, North Holland to Batavia, Netherlands East Indies. She was refloated the next day and taken in to The Downs.

== 22 May ==
List of shipwrecks: 23 May 1850
Ship	State	Description
Albert	United Kingdom	The steamship ran aground and was severely damaged at Grantown, Moray. Her 80 passengers were landed safely. She was on a voyage from Stirling to Grantown
Dundee	United Kingdom	The paddle steamer ran aground on the Abertay Sand, in the North Sea off the coast of Forfarshire. She was refloated the next day and taken in to Dundee for repairs.
St. Louis	United States	The steamboat suffered a boiler explosion at St. Louis, Missouri with the loss of 25 lives. Forty survivors were severely scalded, with further casualties expected.

== 23 May ==
List of shipwrecks: 23 May 1850
Ship	State	Description
Ocean	United Kingdom	The ship foundered in the Atlantic Ocean. Her crew were rescued by Wolfville (United States). Ocean was on a voyage from Glasgow, Renfrewshire to Boston, Massachusetts, United States.

== 24 May ==
List of shipwrecks: 24 May 1850
Ship	State	Description
Seraphine	United Kingdom	The ship developed a leak and foundered in the Atlantic Ocean after encountering a hurricane on May 21 while crossing from Warrenpoint to New York and was abandoned off the coast of New England without loss of life.
Sulimany	India	The ship was driven ashore and wrecked at Madras with the loss of more than 33 lives.
Ville de Marans	France	The ship ran aground on the Cork Sand, in the North Sea off the coast of Suffolk, United Kingdom. She was on a voyage from Newcastle upon Tyne, Northumberland, United Kingdom to Marseille, Bouches-du-Rhône. She was refloated and taken in to Harwich, Essex, United Kingdom in a leaky condition.
Woodman	United Kingdom	The ship capsized at South Shields, County Durham. She was righted on 25 May.

== 25 May ==
List of shipwrecks: 25 May 1850
Ship	State	Description
Dart	Belgium	The ship was driven ashore 5 nautical miles (9.3 km) west of Dunbar, Lothian, United Kingdom. She was on a voyage from Ostend, West Flanders to Leith, Lothian.
Felice	Malta	The brig was wrecked on the Galibia Shoals, off the coast of the Beylik of Tunis. All on board were rescued. She was on a voyage from Malta to Southampton, Hampshire.
Frau Dorothea	Duchy of Holstein	The ship departed from Newcastle upon Tyne, Northumberland, United Kingdom for Husum. No further trace, presumed foundered with the loss of all hands.

== 26 May ==
List of shipwrecks: 26 May 1850
Ship	State	Description
Bamborough Castle	United Kingdom	The ship ran aground on the Skerry of Stroma. She was on a voyage from Bo'ness, Lothian to Thurso, Caithness. She was refloated and completed her voyage.
Clydesdale	United Kingdom	The ship was driven ashore at Cardiff, Glamorgan. She was on a voyage from London to Cuba. She was refloated, and taken in to Cardiff, where she arrived on 1 June.
Po	France	The ship sank off Cape Horn, Chile. She was on a voyage from Bordeaux, Gironde to Alta California.
Virginie	(United Kingdom of Great Britain and Ireland)	The ship was lost off Scatterie Island, Nova Scotia.

== 27 May ==
List of shipwrecks: 27 May 1850
Ship	State	Description
Contest	(United Kingdom of Great Britain and Ireland) British North America	The ship ran aground on the Chebogue Ledges, off Yarmouth, Nova Scotia. She was on a voyage from Mayagüez, Puerto Rico to Halifax, Nova Scotia. She was refloated and taken in to Yarmouth in a leaky condition.
Countess of Bective	United Kingdom	The ship was in collision with Glenlyon (United Kingdom and foundered in the Bristol Channel between Lundy Island and Hartland Point, Devon. Her crew were rescued. She was on a voyage from Cuba to Swansea, Glamorgan.
John Mowlem	United Kingdom	The ship ran ashore in Colwell Bay, Isle of Wight. She was on a voyage from Newcastle upon Tyne, Northumberland to Weymouth, Dorset. She was refloated and taken in to Yarmouth, Isle of Wight.

== 28 May ==
List of shipwrecks: 28 May 1850
Ship	State	Description
Argyra	United Kingdom	The ship was wrecked on the Bona Vista Reef.
Express	United Kingdom	The ship was driven ashore in Cow Bay, Cape Breton Island, Nova Scotia, British North America. She was on a voyage from Cádiz, Spain to Newfoundland, British North America.
Lady Sale	United Kingdom	The ship ran aground on the Red Bank, in the Gambia River. She was on a voyage from Bathurst, Gambia Colony and Protectorate to London. She was refloated the next day with assistance from HMS Dover (Royal Navy) and put back to Bathurst.
Moffat	United Kingdom	The ship ran aground at Liverpool, Lancashire. She was on a voyage from Liverpool to Bombay, India. She was refloated the next day.
Retrieve	United Kingdom	The ship was wrecked on the Huevos Bocas, off the coast of Trinidad.

== 29 May ==
List of shipwrecks: 29 May 1850
Ship	State	Description
Abeona	(United Kingdom of Great Britain and Ireland) British North America	The ship was wrecked on the coast of Nova Scotia. She was on a voyage from Newfoundland to Sydney, Nova Scotia.
Hawk	United Kingdom	The schooner was in collision with the steamship Rotterdam (Netherlands) and foundered with the loss of all but one of her crew. She was on a voyage from Antwerp, Belgium to London.
Margaret	United Kingdom	The ship ran aground on the Blackwater Bank, in Liverpool Bay. She was on a voyage from Liverpool, Lancashire to a port in Alta California.
Sarah	(United Kingdom of Great Britain and Ireland) British North America	The ship was driven ashore east of Tracadie, Nova Scotia. She was on a voyage from Prince Edward Island to Chaleur Bay. She was consequently condemned.
Sea Nymph	United Kingdom	The brig was wrecked on Prince Edward Island. She was on a voyage from Algiers, Algeria to Charlottetown, Prince Edward Island.

== 30 May ==
List of shipwrecks: 30 May 1850
Ship	State	Description
Expedit	Sweden	The ship was abandoned north east of São Miguel Island, Azores. Her crew were rescued. She was on a voyage from Brazil to Sweden.
Harriet Emma, and Kate	United Kingdom	Harriet Emma collided with the schooner Kate off the coast of County Durham. Three crew of Harriet Emma were reported to have been rescued by the schooner Elizabeth (United Kingdom). Two survivors from Harriet and Emma were rescued by Prince Albert ( (United Kingdom of Great Britain and Ireland) Jersey). There were two survivors from Kate, which was on a voyage from Seaham, County Durham to Rouen, Seine-Inférieure, France. Harriet Emma was on a voyage from Sunderland, County Durham to Wisbech, Cambridgeshire.

== 31 May ==
List of shipwrecks: 31 May 1850
Ship	State	Description
Charlotte	Norway	The ship sank off the Russian coast with the loss of all but three of her crew. She was on a voyage from Bergen to Saint Petersburg, Russia.
Gezia	United Kingdom	The ship ran aground on the Sunk Sand, in the North Sea off the coast of Suffolk. She was on a voyage from Amsterdam, North Holland, Netherlands to Genoa, Kingdom of Sardinia. She was refloated and taken in to Harwich, Essex in a leaky condition.
Isabella	United Kingdom	The ship sprang a leak and foundered off Land's End, Cornwall. Her crew were rescued. She was on a voyage from Fowey, Cornwall to Cardiff, Glamorgan.
Susan	United Kingdom	The ship was driven ashore on Læsø, Denmark. She was on a voyage from Nakskov, Denmark to Belfast, County Antrim. She was refloated and taken in to Frederikshavn, Denmark.

== Unknown date ==
List of shipwrecks: Unknown date 1850
Ship	State	Description
Admiral Collingwood	United Kingdom	The ship was driven ashore 3 nautical miles (5.6 km) south of Redcar, Yorkshire. She was on a voyage from King's Lynn, Norfolk to Hartlepool, County Durham. She was refloated on 17 May and taken in to Middlesbrough, Yorkshire.
Astrea	United Kingdom	The brig was sunk by ice in the Atlantic Ocean. Her crew were rescued by William (United Kingdom).
Carnation	United Kingdom	The ship was driven ashore at Saint Thomas, Province of Canada, British North America between 18 and 25 May.
China	United States	The ship was destroyed by fire in the Atlantic Ocean off the coast of Brazil. Her crew survived. She was on a voyage from New York to Alta California.
Collector	United Kingdom	The schooner was sunk by ice in the Atlantic Ocean. Her crew were rescued. She was on a voyage from Saint John's, Newfoundland, British North America to London.
Eagle	(United Kingdom of Great Britain and Ireland) New South Wales	The steamship ran aground in the Hunter River before 4 May.
Eleanor	(United Kingdom of Great Britain and Ireland) New Zealand	The schooner was lost near the mouth of Queen Charlotte Sound during the first few days of May. All hands were saved.
Friendship	United Kingdom	The ship was wrecked on the Whittaker Spit, in the North Sea off the coast of Essex before 9 May.
Gosnell	United Kingdom	The ship was sunk by ice in the Atlantic Ocean. Her crew were rescued.
Isabella	(United Kingdom of Great Britain and Ireland) Jersey	The brig ran aground on the Herd Sand, in the North Sea off the coast of County Durham. She was refloated on 25 May and proceeded on her voyage to Jersey.
Jovial	France	The ship was wrecked on Santorini, Greece before 16 May. She was on a voyage from "Gaffa" to Cette, Hérault.
Lotus	United Kingdom	The brig was abandoned in the Atlantic Ocean before 20 May.
Maria	Netherlands	The barque was wrecked in the Bay of Anpanam, China before 22 May.
Merchant	United States	The ship was abandoned in the Atlantic Ocean before 22 May. She was discovered on that day by Black River Packet (United Kingdom and set afire.
Musica	United Kingdom	The ship was wrecked near Cape Bon, Beylik of Tunis. She was on a voyage from London to Constantinople, Ottoman Empire.
Nautilus	United Kingdom	The ship ran aground on the Longfleet Reef, off the coast of Africa before 13 May. She was refloated and put back to Sierra Leone, where she was condemned.
Newport Trader	United Kingdom	The ship was lost off Deal, Kent before 7 May.
Nordpolen	Hamburg	The ship was wrecked at Zapallar, Chile before 30 May. Her crew were rescued.
Sylph	United Kingdom	The ship was sunk by ice in the Atlantic Ocean. Her crew were rescued.
Thetis	United Kingdom	The ship was beached at Caister-on-Sea, Norfolk. She was refloated on 13 May and taken it to Great Yarmouth, Norfolk.
Trial	United Kingdom	The ship was driven ashore at Swanage, Dorset. She was refloated on 12 May.
Waterwitch	United Kingdom	The ship foundered in the Irish Sea off the coast of Anglesey.
Wilberforce	United Kingdom	The ship was driven ashore at Arichat, Nova Scotia, British North America. She was on a voyage from Halifax, Nova Scotia to Sydney, Nova Scotia.
Wilhelmina	United Kingdom	The ship was sunk by ice in the Atlantic Ocean. Her crew were rescued by Favourite (United Kingdom).
Wisbeach	United Kingdom	The brig foundered in the Atlantic Ocean before 18 May. Her crew were rescued by Hercules (United Kingdom).
Zwaan	Stettin	The ship struck a sunken rock and capsized at Gallipoli, Ottoman Empire. Her crew were rescued. She was on a voyage from Gallipoli to Stettin.
