= Cuckoo (Mineral, Virginia) =

Historic house in Virginia, United States

- U.S. National Register of Historic Places
- Virginia Landmarks Register
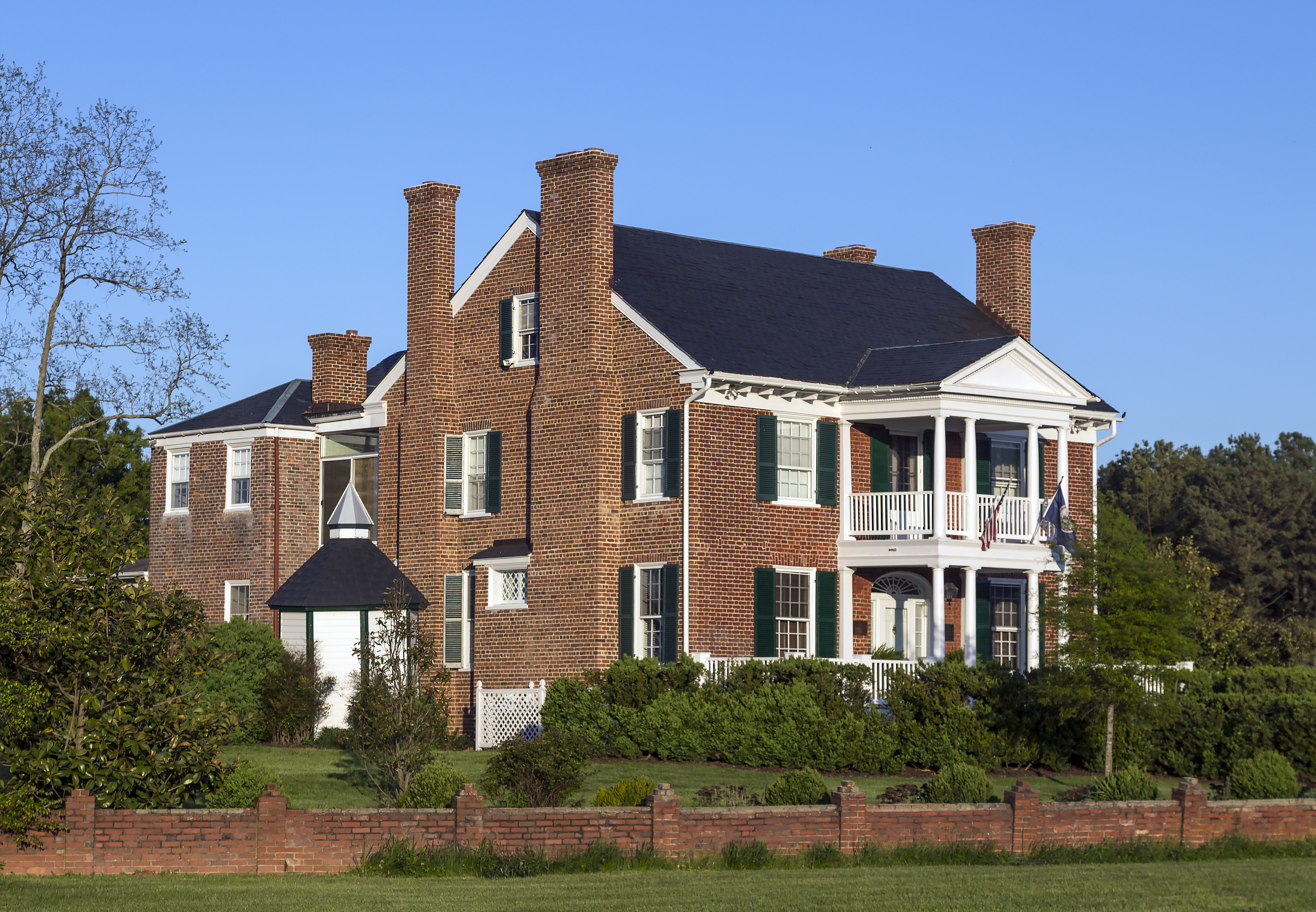
- Cuckoo in 2015

- Location within Virginia Location within the United States
- Location: Jct. of US 33 and VA 522 S, near Mineral, Virginia
- Coordinates: 37°57′11.51″N 77°53′59.69″W
- Area: 47.1 acres (19.1 ha)
- Built: 1819
- Architect: Stanislaw J. Makielski (1938 addition)
- Architectural style: Colonial Revival, Federal
- NRHP reference No.: 94000550
- VLR No.: 054-0016

Significant dates
- Added to NRHP: August 19, 1994
- Designated VLR: April 20, 1994

Cuckoo is a Federal-style house in the small community of Cuckoo, Virginia near Mineral, Virginia, built in 1819 for Henry Pendleton. Cuckoo was listed on the National Register of Historic Places on August 19, 1994. The house is prominently sited on U.S. Route 33, which curves around the house. Cuckoo's interior retains Federal detailing alongside Colonial Revival elements from the early 20th century. The house is notable for its design, prominence and its association with the Pendleton family of doctors. The house was named after the Cuckoo Tavern, which had stood nearby since 1788. It has been in the Pendleton family since its construction.

== History ==
The initial construction featured a two-story front section with a one-story extension to the rear, housing the dining room and the winter kitchen. Between 1839 and 1907 the house was owned by Dr. Philip Barbour Pendleton, who added a second floor to the rear wing and extended the main roof to cover the new row of rooms across the back of the house. A later generation of Pendletons remodeled the house in the Colonial Revival style after 1910, adding the present Neoclassical portico. The next owners, Anne Pendleton Forrest and Dr. William Mentzel Forrest, added to the rear wing with a design by architect Stanislaw J. Makielski of Charlottesville. The complex includes a number of outbuildings, including two separate doctor's office buildings, a garage, a barn, a smokehouse, and the Pendleton family cemetery.

== Description ==
Cuckoo is a brick two-story three-bay center-hall structure, with single rooms flanking the stair hall. The house is fronted by a porch across its entire width. A second set of rooms, part of the original one-story section, lie to the rear of the front rooms, with further 20th-century additions across the back. A semicircular closet with a small window projects on the ground floor between the fireplaces of the rooms to the right of the center hall. The fireplaces and chimneys project prominently from both side elevations. The Makielski addition to the rear features a bowed porch that echoes the curve of the closet. The interior of the addition includes a back stairway.

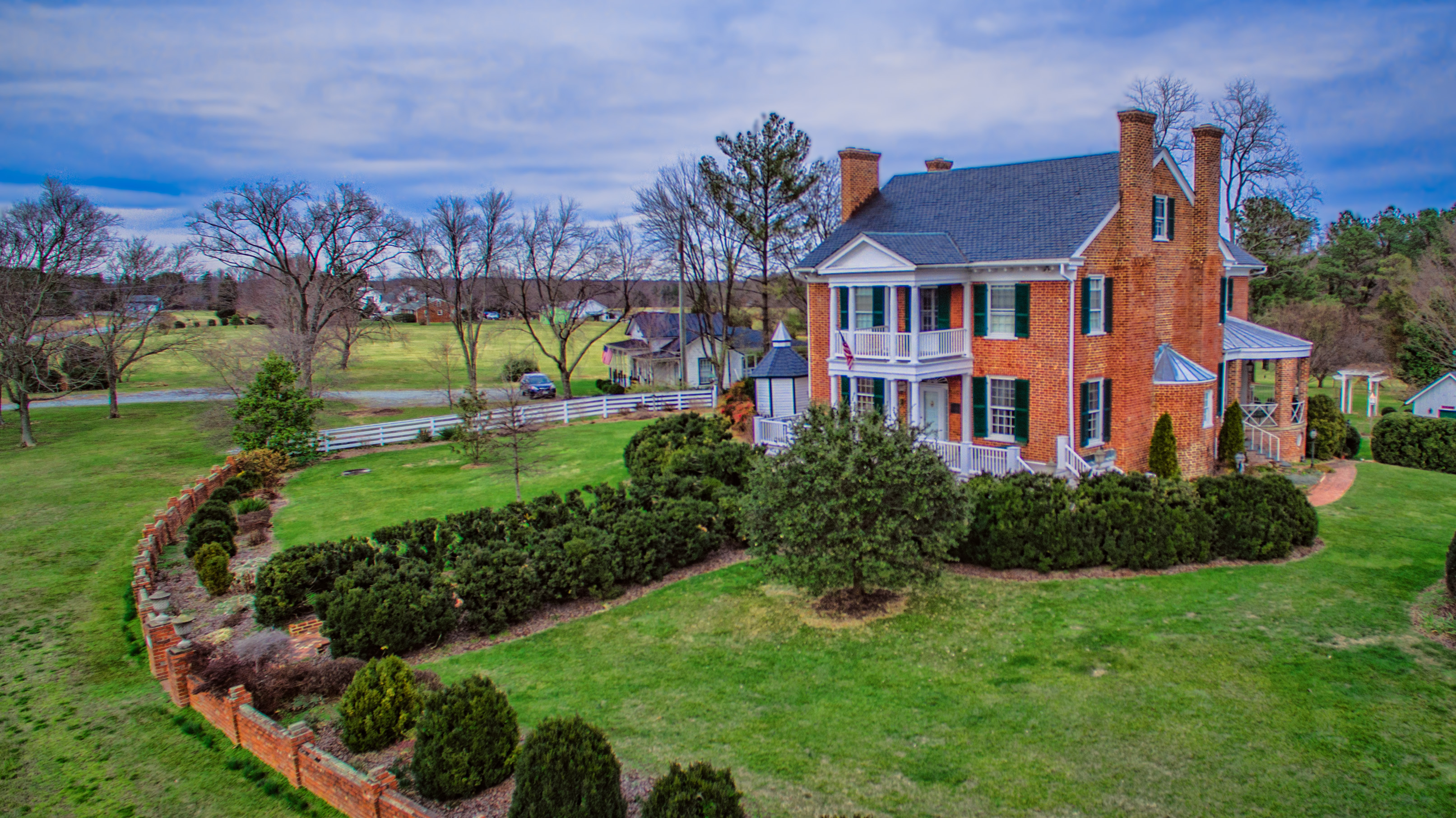
Historic Cuckoo house

=== Outbuildings ===
The small doctor's office is believed to have been built in the early-to-mid 19th century for Dr. Robert Barret a short distance to the north of Cuckoo, and was moved to Cuckoo by Dr. Philip Barbour Pendleton prior to the Civil War for use as Pendleton's medical office. The large doctor's office was built circa 1888 for Dr. Eugene Pendleton on the grounds of his house, named Linwood, in the village of Cuckoo. It was expanded to accommodate his son's practice about 1908, and was moved to Cuckoo in 1910 when Eugene moved there. The office was moved again in 1972 when the highway was widened, and was used as a medical office by Dr. Eugene Barbour Pendleton until 1979. A smokehouse was built in the late 19th century, and a barn in the early 20th century. An octagonal wood wellhouse, built in the late 19th or early 20th century, stands close to the main house. A garage was built in the 1930s.

=== Cemetery ===
The Pendleton cemetery is located in an oak grove at the top of a small rise about 1/4 mile from the house. Surrounded by a low stone wall, the cemetery contains three gravestones and several unmarked graves.

== Recent history ==
Cuckoo was listed on the National Register of Historic Places on August 19, 1994. The house sustained damage in the 2011 Virginia earthquake, with the collapse of its tall chimneys. The damage was repaired.
