= Cuckoo (sniper) =

Sniper disguised in a sprawling tree

A cuckoo is a military slang term for a sniper, disguised in a sprawling tree. This word has been particularly applied to the Finnish Winter War snipers and the World War II German snipers, who took pot-shots at enemy troops from hidden vantage points.

Shooting from a tree is a well-known method of hunting dangerous predatory animals. In the USSR, shooting from a tree was recommended when setting up an ambush for a bear, if the hunter was armed with a smoothbore 12 gauge shotgun.

During World War II, before 1944, the German high command left many cuckoos behind as their armies retreated, in order to delay the Soviet rush.

In September 1941, during the defense of Odessa, Soviet sniper L. M. Pavlichenko shot and killed MG-34 machine gun crew (two soldiers from the 4th Romanian Army) and one enemy officer from a position in a maple tree. She fired four times from a 7.62mm M1891/30 bolt-action rifle with PE optical sight, wearing a non-standard self-made shaggy camouflage suit over her military uniform. It was later revealed that the killed officer was a major G. Caragea from the headquarters of the Romanian army

On April 5, 1945, on the front line near the city of Rothenburg, Jan Zyża, a private in the 26th Infantry Regiment of the 9th Infantry Division of the 2nd Polish Army, was shot dead by a German sniper in a tree. After the first shot, the sniper was discovered and killed by fire from an anti-tank rifle.

Japanese snipers reportedly fired on US troops from trees.

== In popular culture ==
The 2002 Russian film The Cuckoo tells a story of Finnish cuckoo sniper.

== See also ==
- List of books, articles and documentaries about snipers
