= Kookoo (disambiguation) =

KooKoo is a 1981 album by Debbie Harry

Kookoo or Koo Koo may also refer to:

- KooKoo (ice hockey club), a Finnish ice hockey team
- Kuku (food), Iranian dish also known as kookoo
- Koo Koo Kanga Roo, an American comedy disco duo also known as Koo Koo
- Koo-Koo the Bird Girl, an American side show entertainer
- "Kookoo", a 2012 song by Barbara Morgenstern from the album Sweet Silence
- "Kookoo", a 2014 single by the band Elani

== See also ==
- Coo Coo (disambiguation)
