= HMS Cuckoo (1806) =

History

United Kingdom
- Name: HMS Cuckoo
- Ordered: 11 December 1805
- Laid down: January 1806
- Launched: 11 April 1806
- Commissioned: May 1806
- Fate: Wrecked 4 April 1810

General characteristics
- Class & type: Cuckoo-class schooner
- Tons burthen: 75 34/94 (bm)
- Length: 56 ft 3 in (17.1 m) (overall); 42 ft 4 1/8 in (12.9 m) (keel)
- Beam: 18 ft 3 1/2 in (5.6 m)
- Draught: Unladen: 5 ft 2 in (1.6 m); Laden: 7 ft 6 in (2.3 m)
- Depth of hold: 8 ft 5 in (2.6 m)
- Sail plan: Schooner
- Complement: 20
- Armament: 4 × 12-pounder carronades

HMS Cuckoo was a Royal Navy Cuckoo-class schooner of four 12-pounder carronades and a crew of 20. She was built by James Lovewell at Great Yarmouth and launched in 1806. Like many of her class and the related Ballahoo-class schooners, she succumbed to the perils of the sea relatively early in her career.

== Service ==
She was commissioned in May 1806 under Lieutenant Silas Hiscutt Paddon for the Channel and the North Sea.

On 26 December 1807, Cuckoo was in company with the frigate Aigle, Defiance and Gibraltar when Aigle captured the Othello.

In March 1808, Cuckoo was part of a squadron off Lorient. She was about midway between the island of Groix and the Glénan islands when she sighted enemy vessels in the south-east. She signaled this to the squadron and Aigle and the 74-gun third rate Impetueux sailed to intercept. Aigle exchanged fire with one, which ran herself aground on Groix under the protection of French batteries there. Aigle suffered 22 wounded, including her captain who was severely wounded, and seven men who then were invalided out of the service. The British observed seven coffins being carried from the French frigate to a church on a nearby hill. The British believed that the vessel that ran ashore was the Seine and that the one that escaped was the Italienne. (Note: Roche makes no mention of the engagement.) Her crew later burnt Seine to prevent her being captured at Anse la Barque during Roquebert's expedition to the Caribbean. Italienne was badly damaged at the action of 24 February 1809 and sold for commercial service.

Cuckoo was in company with Aigle and Donegal when Donegal captured the French chasse maree Jeune Adele on 22 May 1808.

Cuckoo accompanied the unsuccessful Walcheren Campaign in July–August 1809, together with her half-sister schooners Pilchard and Porgey.

== Fate ==
Cuckoo was wrecked on 4 April 1810 on the Haak Sands off the Texel at Callantsoog. She had been under orders to capture all foreign vessels employed in the herring or other fisheries.

She wrecked at 11pm and by 1am she was awash and her crew was forced to take to the rigging. Two persons on Cuckoo died of exposure. One of the two fatalities was Paddon's five-year-old son; the other was a seaman. During the sinking a falling spar broke Paddon's right shoulder-blade and two of his ribs, injuries that would bother him for the rest of his life. The Dutch rescued the surviving crew who surrendered to troops from Amsterdam.

A later court martial admonished Paddon for relying too heavily on Joseph Delaby, the pilot, who by then had deserted. (Note: Still, Paddon remained in the Royal Navy, eventually rising to the rank of Commander before retiring on half pay.)
