= The Cuckoo (film) =

- Film poster
- Directed by: Aleksandr Rogozhkin
- Written by: Aleksandr Rogozhkin
- Produced by: Sergei Selianov
- Starring: Anni-Kristiina Juuso; Ville Haapasalo; Viktor Bychkov
- Cinematography: Andrey Zhegalov
- Music by: Dmitry Pavlov
- Distributed by: STV (Russian: СТВ)
- Release date: 26 June 2002 (Moscow International Film Festival)
- Running time: 105 minutes
- Country: Russia
- Languages: Finnish; Russian; Saami

The Cuckoo (Russian: Кукушка, romanized: Kukushka) is a 2002 Russian war drama film directed by Aleksandr Rogozhkin. It takes place during World War II, and the action is seen from the opposing perspectives of a Soviet soldier and a Finnish soldier stranded together at a Sami woman's farmhouse. It received generally positive reviews from critics.

In 2004, film was awarded the State Prize of the Russian Federation.

== Plot ==
In September 1944, in the final moments of the Continuation War against the Soviet Union, Veikko (Ville Haapasalo), a Finnish soldier, is turned in by his Finnish compatriots for being in their eyes a would-be deserter. As punishment, the young man is placed in shackles, chained to a rock outcrop in a remote Lapland forest, and left with nothing but a few supplies and a rifle and ammunition – effectively forced to be a forlorn hope kukushka (cuckoo sniper). To ensure his willingness to fight, they dress him in the uniform of the German Waffen-SS, as Soviet soldiers feel little mercy towards SS men. Days pass, and after several failed attempts, Veikko succeeds in freeing himself; and he heads for safety, shackles still attached.

Meanwhile, Ivan (Viktor Bychkov), a captain in the Red Army accused of anti-Soviet correspondence, is arrested by the NKVD secret police. En route to his court martial, Soviet planes accidentally bomb the vehicle carrying the disgraced captain, killing the driver and Ivan's guard. Veikko, at this stage still chained to the rock, witnesses the bombing through his rifle scope.

Not far away is the farm of Anni (Anni-Kristiina Juuso), a Sámi reindeer farmer whose husband was taken away together with their whole reindeer herd by Germans four years earlier, never to return. Hungry and alone, the young and resourceful widow locates the bodies of Ivan and his captors while foraging for food. As she begins to bury the dead, Anni discovers that Ivan is still alive, but seriously hurt. She carries him to her wooden hut and nurses him back to health. Meanwhile, Veikko, in search of tools to remove his shackles, stumbles upon Anni's farm.

None of the three characters speaks either of the others' languages. Comic and sometimes tragic misunderstandings soon arise, resulting in passionate relationships. Unable to communicate with the others and unaware that the war between the USSR and Finland is over, Ivan is convinced that Veikko is a German soldier gone astray. To Ivan, the German uniform the Finnish soldier was forced to wear is further proof. Ivan even refuses to tell Veikko his name, answering only "Poshol ty!" («Пошёл ты!» "Get lost!") — as a result, the two others think Ivan's name is "Psholty". Veikko is unaware of Ivan's hatred and just wants to cut off his shackles, return home and put the war behind him, but opts to stay on Anni's farm to avoid falling into enemy hands. The earthy and sensuous Anni, who has not been with a man in four years, could not be more delighted with her good fortune, disregarding the language barrier between them.

For Anni, Veikko and Ivan are not enemies, but just men. Uncommon and touching bonds develop, as the three unlikely souls begin a domestic routine of hunting and gathering in preparation for the long Lapp winter. The two men do what they can to contribute to Anni's well-being. Veikko builds a sauna and Ivan picks mushrooms. Veikko, Ivan, and Anni communicate only with gestures. Starved for love and physical touch, Anni seduces young, strapping Veikko, much to the chagrin of jealous, middle-aged Ivan.

Not long afterwards a Soviet biplane crashes in the forest near Anni's hut, spilling leaflets announcing an armistice between Finland and the USSR. Veikko thinks he can finally return home safely; but Ivan, who does not understand Finnish, manages to find a revolver Nagant in the wreckage; and still convinced that Veikko is an enemy, shoots him when Veikko tries to take the gun. When Ivan reads the last line of the leaflet the plane was dropping (written in Russian and instructing Soviet soldiers to allow the Finns to return home unharmed), he realizes that the war is over. Ivan is torn with remorse; and, stumbling, carries Veikko back to the farm.

The nurturing Anni brings Veikko back from the brink of death through a series of ancient Sami magic rituals. With Veikko bedridden, Anni's needs for companionship and sexual longing draw Ivan into her bed. Gradually, Ivan and Veikko, no longer separated by ethnic hate or by rivalry for the affections of Anni, become friends. As winter arrives and the two men head back to their respective homes in opposite directions, Anni is left behind with memories, and much more, of her two men. In the final scene, she narrates the story to her children, whom she has named after their fathers: Veikko and Psholty.

== Cast ==
- Anni-Kristiina Juuso — Anni, Sami woman
- Ville Haapasalo — Veikko, Finnish sniper
- Viktor Bychkov — Captain Ivan Kartuzov ("Psholty")

== Crew ==
- Director: Aleksander V. Rogozhkin
- Screenplay: Aleksander V. Rogozhkin
- Director of Photography: Andrey Zhegalov (Russian: Андрей Жегалов)
- Film Art: Vladimir I. Svetozarov (Russian: Светозаров, Владимир Иосифович)
- Composer: Dmitriy Pavlov (Russian: Павлов, Дмитрий)

== Production ==
Filming took place on the shores of the Kandalaksha Gulf.

== Reception ==
=== Critical response ===
Based on 61 reviews collected by Rotten Tomatoes, The Cuckoo has an overall approval rating from critics of 87%, with an average score of 7/10. The website's critical consensus states, "A sweet and amusing comedy". On Metacritic, the film has a weighted average score of 69 out of 100, based on 27 critics, indicating "generally favorable reviews".

=== Awards ===
- June 2002 - 24th Moscow International Film Festival - presented as a part of the competition program
  - Prize "Silver Saint George" (Russian: Серебряный Святой Георгий) - Best Director
  - Prize "Silver Saint George" - Best Actor - Ville Haapasalo
  - Viewers' Choice Prize
  - Prize FIPPRESSI
  - Russia's Cinema Club Federation Prize
- July 2002 - X Festival of the Festivals in Saint Petersburg - Grand Prize "Golden Griffin" - best film
- August 2002 - X Film Festival "Window to Europe" in Vyborg - presented as a part of the competition program
  - Grand Prize - best film
  - Prize for the best female actor- Anni-Kristiina Juuso
  - 1 - 2nd place ( with film "The Star") in the external nomination "Vyborg's Count"
- October 2002 - International film festival "Europa Cinema" in Viareggio, Italy - presented as a part of the competition program
  - Main Prize - Best film
  - Prize - Best director
- December 2002 — 3 awards Golden Aries of the National Guild of Film Critics and Film Press:
  - Best film of the year
  - Best screenplay
  - Best female actor
- 2002 Cottbus Film Festival of Young East European Cinema – Dialog Award
- February 2003 - 4 awards "Golden Eagle":
  - Best film of the year
  - Best director
  - Best screenplay
  - Best male actor - Viktor Bychkov
- March 2003 - 4 awards Nika:
  - Best movie of the year
  - Best director
  - Best female actor
  - Best film artist
- 2003 - International Film Festival in Troy, Portugal
  - Prize for the best film
  - Prize for the best female actor
- 2003 — International Film Festival in San Francisco — Viewers' Choice Prize (tied with Whale Rider)
- 2003 — XI Russian Film Festival in Onfler, France
  - Grand Prize best film
  - Best male actor - Viktor Bychkov
  - Prize for Best female actor - Anni-Kristiina Juuso

In June 2004, a Russian Federation National Award in Art and Literature Area was awarded to the crew of the film: to the director and the author of the screenplay, Aleksandr Rogozhkin; producer Segei Selianov; main cast Anni-Kristiina Juuso, Ville Haapasalo, and Viktor Bychkov; director of photography Andrey Zhegalov; director of the film art Vladimir I. Svetozarov; composer Dmitriy Pavlov; and sound engineers Anatoliy Gudkov and Sergei Sokolov.
