= The Cuckoos =

The Cuckoos may refer to:

- The Cuckoos (1930 film), a U.S. musical comedy
- The Cuckoos (1949 film), a German comedy-drama
