= Bremo =

Bremo may refer to:

- Bremo Bluff, Virginia
- Bremo Historic District, which includes Bremo Plantation and the areas of Bremo Recess, Lower Bremo and Upper Bremo
- Bremo Slave Chapel
