= D. Wiley Anderson =

American architect

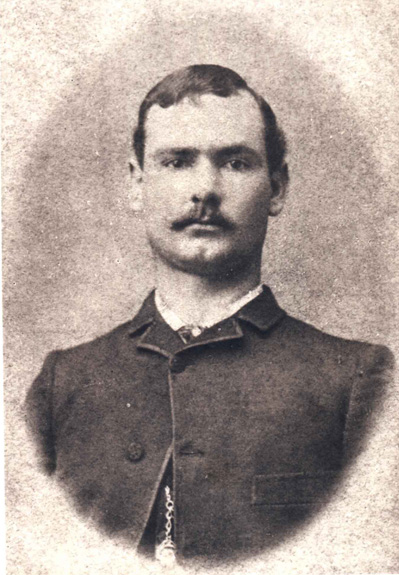
D. Wiley Anderson, c. 1900

David Wiley Anderson (August 20, 1864 in Louisa, Virginia – April 7, 1940 in Scottsville, Virginia) was an American architect based in Richmond, Virginia. He was well known in Virginia for his residential, commercial and institutional designs. A number of his works are listed on the U.S. National Register of Historic Places.

Works include (with attribution):

- Benswanger House, 2230 Monument Ave. Richmond, VA (Anderson, D. Wiley), NRHP-listed
- Boxley Place, 103 Ellisville Dr. Louisa, VA (Anderson, D. Wiley), NRHP-listed
- Ednam House, US 250 Ednam, VA (Anderson, D. Wiley), NRHP-listed
- Hermitage Road Historic District, 3800-4200 blocks of Hermitage Rd. Richmond, VA (Anderson, D. Wiley), NRHP-listed
- Louisa County Courthouse, Jct. of Main St. and VA 208 Louisa, VA (Anderson, D. Wiley), NRHP-listed
- Miller School of Albemarle, SE of Yancey Mills off VA 635 Yancey Mills, VA (Anderson, D. Wiley), NRHP-listed
- Oakwood--Chimborazo Historic District, Roughly N 30th-N 39th St., Chimborazo, Meldon, Oakwood, E Broad, Briel, E Clay, E Leigh, M, E Marshall, N, O, and P Richmond, VA (Anderson, D. Wiley), NRHP-listed
- Rivanna Farm, Rte. 1, Bremo Bluff, VA (Anderson, D. Wiley), NRHP-listed
- One or more works in Union Hill Historic District, roughly 20th, 21st, 22nd, 23rd, 24th 25th, Jessamine, Pink, Burton, Carrington, Cedar, Clay, Jefferson, Leigh, M, O, Sts Richmond, VA (Anderson, D. Wiley), NRHP-listed
