= Rivanna =

Rivanna may refer to:

== Places in Virginia ==
- Rivanna, Virginia, a census-designated place in Albemarle County
- Rivanna, Virginia (unincorporated community), an unincorporated community in Albemarle County
- Rivanna Farm, a farm near Bremo Bluff, Virginia
- Rivanna River, a tributary of the James River
- Rivanna Subdivision Trestle, a trestle in Richmond, Virginia

== Other uses ==
- Rivanna Junction, a 2006 album by Tim Barry
