= Toy Soldiers (1991 film) =

1991 film by Daniel Petrie

- U.S. theatrical poster
- Directed by: Daniel Petrie Jr.
- Written by: David Koepp; Daniel Petrie Jr.
- Based on: Toy Soldiers by William P. Kennedy
- Produced by: Jack E. Freedman; Wayne S. Williams; Patricia Herskovic
- Starring: Sean Astin; Wil Wheaton; Keith Coogan; Andrew Divoff; Lou Gossett Jr.; Denholm Elliott
- Cinematography: Thomas Burstyn
- Edited by: Michael Kahn
- Music by: Robert Folk
- Production company: Island World
- Distributed by: Tri-Star Pictures
- Release date: April 26, 1991 (U.S.)
- Running time: 111 minutes
- Country: United States
- Languages: English; Spanish
- Budget: $14 million
- Box office: $15.1 million

Toy Soldiers is a 1991 American action thriller film directed by Daniel Petrie Jr. and starring Sean Astin, Wil Wheaton, Keith Coogan, Andrew Divoff, Louis Gossett Jr. and Denholm Elliott. Pitched as "Die Hard Meets the Dead Poets Society", its plot revolves around an all-male boarding school overtaken by terrorists. While the authorities remain helpless, a group of rebellious and mischievous students decide to put their resourcefulness to good use.

== Plot ==
In Barranquilla, Colombia, terrorist Luis Cali has taken over the Palace of Justice with a team of mercenaries. He demands the release of his drug kingpin father, Enrique Cali, only to learn that his father has already been extradited to the United States to stand trial. They escape by helicopter, and with the weapons and logistics assistance of Luis's second-in-command, an American named Jack Thorpe, they enter the U.S. through Mexico.

In the United States, the Regis High School is a prep school for teenage boys with wealthy and influential parents, many of whom have been expelled from other schools. A group of pranksters led by William "Billy" Tepper that includes Billy's best friend Joey Trotta, and their friends Hank Giles, Ricardo Montoya, "Snuffy" Bradberry, and Phil Donoghue are carefully watched over by their teachers and the stern but well-meaning dean Edward Parker. Phil's father is the federal judge presiding over Enrique Cali's trial, so the entire family is taken to a safe location as a precaution. Unaware of this, Luis Cali and his men invade the school to capture the boy, killing a campus police officer and a faculty member who intervenes. They set up lookout posts with heavy firearms and rig the campus with C-3 explosives. With Phil nowhere to be found but with the sons of numerous influential individuals in his grasp, Luis takes the entire school hostage.

Underestimating the threat, the local sheriff attempts to intervene but is repelled by heavy weapons fire. The state police, FBI and US Army are called in, keeping their distance to avoid provoking the terrorists. Jack arms the explosives with a detonator wired to a remote control gadget which Luis tapes to the back of his hand. Luis warns the authorities he will set off the explosives should they attack the school. He releases the school faculty except for the cooks and the headmaster, Dr. Robert Gould, demanding his father's release in exchange for the hostages, and institutes hourly headcounts.

The students, under Billy's leadership, use their expertise in skirting authority to collect tactical information about the terrorists, which Billy covertly brings to the authorities on the outside. They bar him from returning, but he escapes with Parker's encouragement and rejoins the students just in time to be counted, preventing the killing of Gould and four students in response. Joey's father, New Jersey mob boss Albert Trotta, arranges for Joey to be released. Joey, contemptuous of his father, refuses to go. He overpowers a guard, steals a submachine gun and opens fire on another terrorist, but is killed in the exchange. Luis tries to impress upon Parker, who comes to retrieve the body, that it was an accident, but the grief-stricken Albert takes revenge by having Enrique Cali killed in prison.

Knowing they must act before Luis can learn of his father's death, the authorities undertake a rescue mission. FBI Hostage Rescue Team personnel (trailed by Parker), supported by the army and armed with the information provided by Billy, infiltrate the school and begin taking out the terrorists. Meanwhile, Billy and his friends sabotage the remote control receiver for the detonator, overpower their guards and lead the students and Gould to a secret basement chamber. Overwhelmed, Luis takes Billy at gunpoint and holds him in Gould's office. He presses the button on his gadget, but due to Billy's machinations only activates a toy airplane. Parker and the commandos converge on Luis and Billy. Luis wounds Parker, but Billy elbows him in the abdomen, giving a commando the chance to shoot Luis in the head, killing him. With Parker's wound bandaged, he and Billy gain a better understanding of each other. The students are freed, the surviving terrorists are arrested, and Billy reunites with his friends.

== Cast ==
- Sean Astin as William "Billy" Tepper
- Wil Wheaton as Joseph "Joey" Trotta
- Louis Gossett Jr. as Dean Edward Parker
- Keith Coogan as Jonathan "Snuffy" Bradberry
- George Perez as Ricardo "Ricky" Montoya
- T.E. Russell as Henry "Hank" Giles III
- Shawn Phelan as Derek "Yogurt" Case
- Knowl Johnson as Phil Donoghue
- Denholm Elliott as Headmaster Dr. Robert Gould
- Jerry Orbach as Albert Trotta (uncredited)
- Andrew Divoff as Luis Cali
- Michael Champion as Jack Thorpe
- Rafael H. Robledo as Carlos
- Thomas R. Trigo as Ruiz
- Jerry Valdez as Jorge
- Jesse Doran as Enrique Cali
- Mason Adams as FBI Dep. Dir. Otis Brown
- R. Lee Ermey as General Ed Kramer
- Richard Travis as Frank Ingram, a Campus Police Officer.
- Stan Kelly as Sheriff James Role
- Jeffrey Dawson as Security Guard

== Production ==
=== Development ===
The film was based on the novel of the same name by William P. Kennedy, an advertising executive who initially wrote it as a hobby. The first screenplay was written by David Koepp. In his draft as in the book, the boarding school was located in Italy and the antagonists were analogues for the Palestine Liberation Front. However, director John Schlesinger, for whom the project was intended, ended up dropping out.

Petrie took an interest in it and reset the story at a U.S. school, while making the terrorists Latin American. Kennedy remained satisfied with the adaptation, even saying that he wished he could retrofit some of the changes into his book. Petrie tried to broker a deal with Disney's Hollywood Pictures, with whom he had a first-look deal as a producer and screenwriter. Hollywood passed but Island World expressed interest, in what would be their first production. They also offered Petrie to direct. The film was initially aligned with embattled distributor Orion Pictures before moving to TriStar, who took over much of Orion's slate around that time.

=== Casting ===
Sean Astin, Wil Wheaton and Keith Coogan all auditioned for the lead role of Billy Tepper. Astin pursued it aggressively. Director Dan Petrie did not think he was the right fit, and had his mind set on Wheaton. When he went on a New York trip to scout for actors, Astin followed him there and took him to a screening of Memphis Belle. Petrie changed his mind and hired him, switching Wheaton to a sidekick role. The latter's Star Trek character, Wesley Crusher, was sent off on a far away mission to accommodate his feature film endeavors. Venezuelan-raised American actor Andrew Divoff was cast as Colombian antagonist Luis Cali, in what he considers to be his breakout role and a personal favorite.

Among the extras, eighty regulars were selected to portray the remaining students. Youths from the entire region were invited to participate, but conflicting schedules meant that few, if any, actual members of the military boarding school used in the movie could appear. The teenage stars did bunk with the cadets for one night before filming to familiarize themselves with their way of life.

=== Filming ===
Photography started on September 5, 1990, and was initially projected to finish around November 15. Much of the shoot took place in Central Virginia. Petrie's father had done the TV movie My Name is Bill W. in nearby Richmond the previous year. Filming there was also attractive as it was a right-to-work state, which did not force filmmakers to hire union members and saved them money. The film was budgeted at $14 million, of which executive producer Mark Burg claimed that about $10 million would trickle down to the local economy. Considering how many of the film's expenses were paid out of state, this implausibly favorable split was called into question by The Charlottesville Observer weekly, prompting a guest editorial by the film's PR man Robert Rhine to address the criticism. Afterwards, Burg quoted a lower windfall of $5 million.

The Miller School of Albemarle near Crozet was the film's central location. According to Burg and Petrie, 600 to 700 schools were considered, while publicist Rhine mentioned that 50 sites had actually been looked at in detail. Miller actively lobbied to get the film with assistance from the state's film office. Neither the school nor the producers disclosed the fee paid for the rental, only mentioning that it would be used to fund "special programs." The school's makeover started about one month in advance. The administrative building's exterior was stretched on two sides at a cost of $250,000. The fake brick walls, respectively 250 ft (76 m) and 90 ft (27 m) long, were made of wood and fiberglass. The set designers also added an arched entrance way, gates and a guard house. Fake trees were placed in the quadrangle, and real autumn leaves were painted green. The original complex received a repaving and refurbishing.

The crew consisted of 150 to 200 people. They worked six-day weeks, but underage extras only worked from Monday to Thursday, and production hired substitute teachers from the area to chaperone them. Extras were paid $55 per day. The school's real boarders followed their regular schedule during filming, occasionally disrupting the shoot during class changes. They had to eat under a tent to free the cafeteria for filming, and were fed by the production in return. To keep them involved, Gossett made a classroom appearance and on Monday mornings, a crew member gave a lecture about his job. Some scenes were shot in two versions, one with cleaner language for television.

The remote controlled plane used by the teens was the "Roun' to-it", the creation of an Austin inventor who had previously used it as an attraction during some Texas Longhorns football games. The U.S. Army assisted with the climax for a symbolic fee, as a promotional venture. They lent four Black Hawk and one Apache helicopters. The FBI commando was portrayed by members of the Army Reserve. They were joined, in an impromptu cameo, by the school's president and director of development. The villains were portrayed by members of the Virginia National Guard. The helicopter assault was performed two times, lasting about five minutes each, on October 7. Gossett wrapped up his scenes on October 23.

The film's production headquarters and main accommodation was the Days Inn, a hotel on Charlottesville's Emmet Street. The Mexican border ambush was shot by Mickey Moore's second unit at a landfill in Waynesboro. It took three days in mid October with an 80-man crew. The hill where the military built their surveying outpost was part of the Wintergreen Ski Resort. The fictional Kings County Sheriff's Office was represented by Louisa County Courthouse. Another scene was shot at the defunct Mount Vernon Motel on Route 29. The prison scenes were filmed in Deer Lodge, Montana.

Petrie and crew left Virginia for four days in San Antonio, Texas, starting on November 4. The U.S. Post Office and Courthouse in the Alamo Plaza district represented Barranquilla's Palacio de Justicia in the film's prologue. Those sessions were hampered by rain, so interiors and exterior schedules were switched around, and giant spotlights used to beam fake sunlight into the building. Military vehicles were loaned from the Texas National Guard. Part of the climax was also done in San Antonio, as the shot of the bullet impact in Divoff's head concluded principal photography on November 7.

=== Post-production ===
Actor T.E. Russell mentioned that he saw four versions of the film during post-production, including rough cut and final.

== Release ==
=== Pre-release ===
Upon signing up for the movie, Miller School's leadership asked for an advance screening of the film, and the production obliged. The film's world premiere took place at the Charlottesville Performance Arts Center, with proceeds going to a scholarship fund honoring the son of Miller School's president, 1st Lt. Donaldson Tillar III, who had recently been killed in the Gulf War. Petrie, co-producer Nicholas Hassitt and author William McNamara attended. For international sales, the film was represented by World Film Services, which was owned by Island World financier John Heyman. and was on its way to clearing all territories during MIFED (Mercato internazionale del film e del documentario) 1990.

=== Theatrical ===
TriStar Pictures distributed Toy Soldiers in the U.S. and several countries. It was originally announced for a March 22, 1991, release. The film debuted on April 26, 1991, at No. 3 on its domestic opening weekend. and grossed $15,073,942 nationwide during its run.

== Reception ==
On Rotten Tomatoes the film has an approval rating of 44% based on reviews from 18 critics. On Metacritic it has a score of 46% based on reviews from 20 critics, indicating "mixed or average reviews". Audiences surveyed by CinemaScore gave the film a grade A− on scale of A to F.

Janet Maslin of The New York Times acknowledged that the script "moves fast but has its humdrum moments". Yet, she deemed that "[n]ovelty counts for a lot in a suspense film, and Toy Soldiers has a genuinely novel gimmick", resulting in a "crisp, suspenseful thriller well tailored to the tastes of teen-age audiences". Roger Hurlburt of the South Florida Sun Sentinel accepted that "Toy Soldiers makes no excuses for an often preposterous story line." However, he believed that "[t]eens and even pre-teens will rally around this slick R-rated adventure simply because it`s about 'them' against vengeful, drug-running bad guys. To this end, Daniel Petrie`s film works remarkably well. Excellent production values—including plenty of gunfire and clandestine chicanery—combine to create suspense and excitement". While acknowledging that "the dialogue is kind of, oh, basic and the characters are really just stick figures", Jay Boyar of the Orlando Sentinel found the film "better than you would naturally assume" thanks to "its pacing which, in an action picture, can almost be enough." He also praised Gossett and Elliott's performances.

Bob Strauss of the Los Angeles Daily News, too, complimented Gossett and Elliott. He was less forgiving towards the screenplay, which he judged "so dopey that it should have been rolled up and stuffed in a dunce cap." His Los Angeles Times counterpart Michael Wilmington also found that the film's concept "ranks high among the most unpromising and ludicrous of the last several years [...] Material like this might have worked if the moviemakers had played it completely crazy and over-the-top, if they’d made it a true satire of the American upper class facing its worst nightmare. But the tone of Toy Soldiers suggests its makers might have tried to turn Animal House into a 'triumph of the spirit' story, too." Roger Ebert of the Chicago Sun-Times wrote: "Since the plot of the movie is utterly predictable, we hope at least for some cleverness in the gimmicks. Here the movie is so disappointing that I wonder if the screenwriters were really trying."

A few reviewers also objected to the film on moral grounds. Bob Carlton of The Birmingham News criticized Gossett's decision to lend his name to a film that "shouldn't have been shot", as "the mix of junior-high bathroom jokes and tough-guy gunplay is especially disturbing". Dave Kehr of the Chicago Tribune described it as "an odd and distasteful attempt to blend the adolescent angst of Dead Poets Society with the comic book violence of Rambo—a concept that probably sounded shrewd and commercial at studio production meetings, but just looks morbid and pandering when actually filmed."

=== Awards ===
For their performance in Toy Soldiers, Sean Astin, Wil Wheaton, Keith Coogan, T.E. Russell and George Perez were all nominated for an Outstanding Young Ensemble Cast in a Motion Picture by the 13th Annual Youth in Film Awards, but lost to Donovan McCrary, Desi Arnez Hines II and Baha Jackson for Boyz n the Hood.

== Soundtrack ==
Toy Soldiers' score was composed by Robert Folk and performed by the Dublin Symphony Orchestra. Randy Miller collaborated to the arrangements. Its symphonic approach, relatively unusual for the action genre, has helped the main theme become a staple of Hollywood trailers, transcending the film's own notoriety. It was issued on CD by Intrada Records, with liner notes by Folk, to coincide with the film's release. It was positively received, with Andy Dursin of Film Score Monthly calling it "a real gem". The same label released a new version on December 7, 2021, which included an alternate, unused version of the main theme.

== Post-release ==
=== TV pilot ===
In early April 1991, a crew came to the Miller School to shoot footage for an unnamed TV pilot, using a few of its real students. The show, about a prep school hiring its first black teacher, was presented by the local press as a possible spin-off of Toy Soldiers.

=== Home media ===
The picture was released on domestic VHS by Columbia TriStar's SVS–Triumph label on November 26, 1991. It arrived on DVD on November 5, 2002, though Columbia TriStar Home Video. A Blu-ray followed on December 11, 2018, via Sony Pictures Home Entertainment.
