= John Neilson (architect) =

Irish master carpenter, joiner, architect, and builder

John Neilson (c.1770—1827) was an Irish immigrant to the United States who eventually settled in Virginia and became a prominent 19th-century master carpenter and joiner, as well as architect and builder. He is most known for his work at Monticello, Montpelier, Bremo, and the University of Virginia.

== Early life ==
Neilson was born around 1770 in the town of Ballycarry, County Antrim, Ireland near Belfast. In the 1790s, Neilson worked as an apprentice to a Belfast architect. At the time, Neilson was also part of a brewing rebellion against the British; and as a result, he was captured along with two of his brothers during the Irish Rebellion of 1798. One of these brothers, William, only sixteen years old, was hanged. John Neilson and his brother Sam were banished and sent on exile ships to the West Indies. John Neilson ended up in Philadelphia, where he became a naturalized citizen on September 28, 1804.

== Career ==
Sometime in 1804 Neilson would meet Thomas Jefferson, who was then the third President of the United States. From that point until 1808 Neilson would live and work as a joiner at Monticello, Jefferson's home in Albemarle County, Virginia. It was at Monticello that Neilson began his long collaboration with fellow master joiner James Dinsmore, who was also an Irishman from Ulster.

Then from 1809–10, Neilson worked on the expansion of Montpelier, the home of the fourth President of the United States, James Madison, located in Orange County, Virginia.

From 1817 to 1820, Neilson worked at Bremo, the Fluvanna County, Virginia, plantation of John Hartwell Cocke. Neilson's most important work took place at this estate because it was Neilson who helped design Upper Bremo by interpreting all the ideas and sketches of Cocke. Indeed, it was Neilson who gave this Palladian masterpiece its final appearance. Bremo has been described by Fiske Kimball as the most nearly perfect "of all the houses in the Jeffersonian tradition."

Neilson later went on to assist in the construction of the University of Virginia. He worked on Pavilions IX and X, seven dormitories, the Rotunda, and the Anatomical Theater.

== Death ==
Neilson died June 24, 1827, at his estate in Keene, Virginia, near Charlottesville. He was buried in an unmarked grave in Charlottesville's Maplewood Cemetery.

Neilson's estate included a number of his own drawings and paintings: a "book of drawings of the U.Va. by Jno. Neilson," a "book of drawings of Ionic, Doric and Corinthian Orders by John Neilson," a "book of observations of the orders of architecture and intended to accompany this book of drawings of the orders," "3 books of drawings with drawings on oil paper," "a book of drawings and designs," and drawings of the Rotunda and two Pavilions.

== Sources ==
- Ceremony honors John Neilson, other Irish notables

http://www.dailyprogress.com/entertainment/ceremony-honors-john-neilson-other-irish-notables/article_bbf9d570-8bc1-558f-a16f-ef87f0b6ad33.html

- "Charlottesville's Architectural Legacy"

http://www2.iath.virginia.edu/schwartz/cville/Lay.html

- Catalog of John Neilson's Drawings

http://www2.iath.virginia.edu/wilson/drawings/neilson.html

- Bremo Historic District Nomination Form

http://www.dhr.virginia.gov/registers/Counties/Fluvanna/032-0002_Bremo_Plantation_1969_Final_Nomination_NHL.pdf

- John Neilson

https://www.monticello.org/site/plantation-and-slavery/john-neilson Dictionary of Ulster Biography http://www.newulsterbiography.co.uk/index.php/home/printPerson/1890
