= Keith Coogan =

American actor and child actor

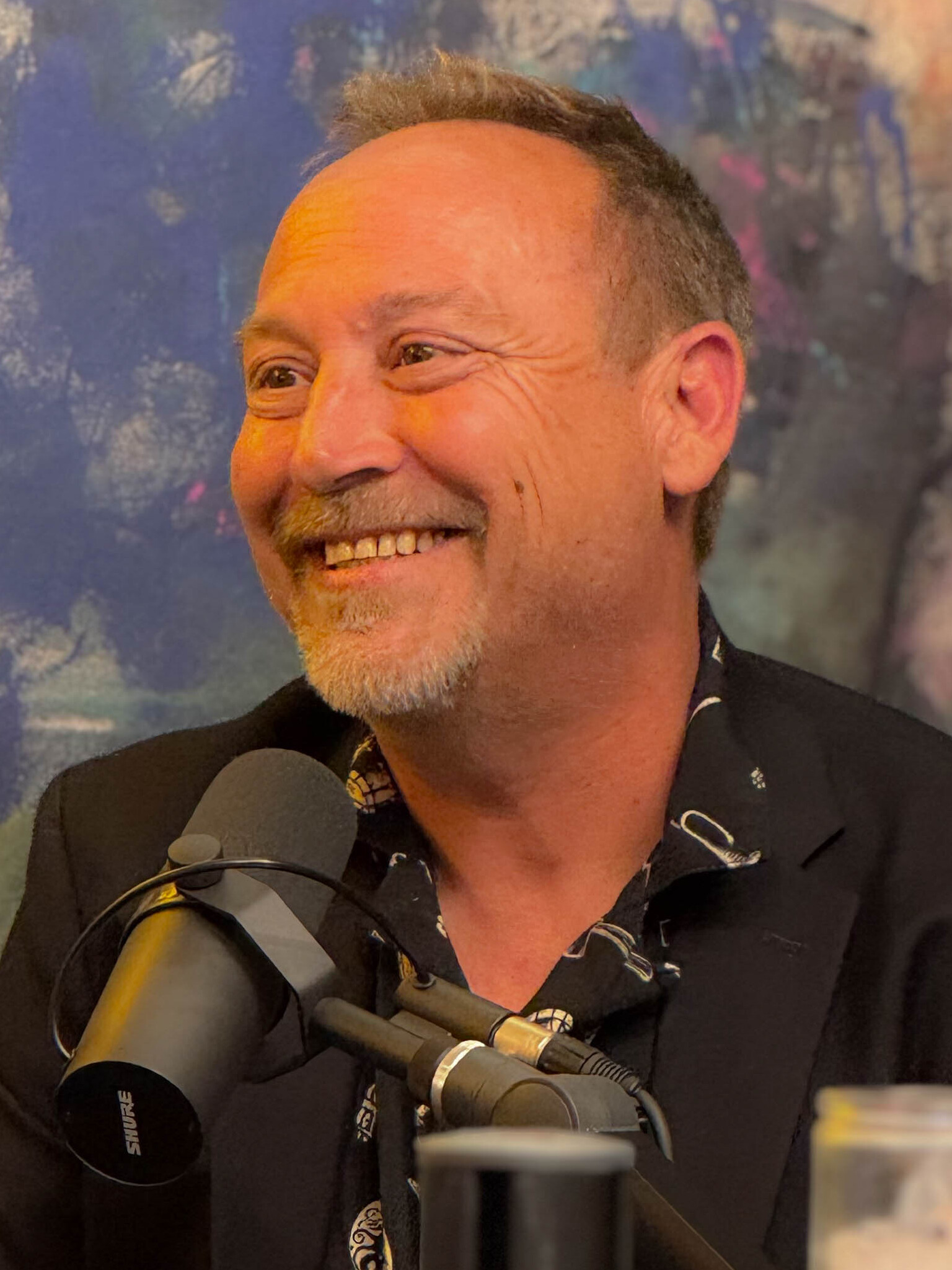
- Coogan in 2025
- Born: Keith Eric Mitchell; January 13, 1970 (age 56); Palm Springs, California, U.S.
- Other name: Keith Mitchell
- Occupation: Actor
- Years active: 1978–present
- Spouse: Kristen Shean (m. 2013)
- Relatives: Jackie Coogan (maternal grandfather); Robert Coogan (maternal granduncle)
- Awards: 1982 Young Artist Award; Best Young Actor, Guest on a Series; Knight Rider episode "A Good Day at White Rock"

Keith Coogan (born Keith Eric Mitchell, January 13, 1970) is an American actor. He is the grandson of actor Jackie Coogan. In 1982, he won a Young Artist Award as a guest performer on Knight Rider.

== Early life ==
Keith Eric Mitchell was born on January 13, 1970, in Palm Springs, California, the son of Leslie Diane Coogan Mitchell, a realtor. He changed his name to "Keith Coogan" in 1986, two years after the death of his grandfather, Jackie Coogan. His grandfather's death notice stated that 14-year-old-grandson Keith Mitchell would be giving a eulogy at the funeral.

== Career ==
As a child, while working as Keith Mitchell, he appeared on episodes of The Love Boat, Fantasy Island, Mork & Mindy, Eight Is Enough, Knight Rider, Fame, 21 Jump Street, CHiPs. and Silver Spoons. From 1979-1980 he had the recurring role of Jeffrey Burton on The Waltons. He later appeared on an episode of Starman.

His film work includes doing the voice of Young Tod, the fox, on The Fox and the Hound. He played Brad Anderson in Adventures in Babysitting, Crush Kane in Book of Love, and Willie Jones in Downhill Willie. Coogan also appeared in Cousins, Toy Soldiers, Don't Tell Mom the Babysitter's Dead, and In the Army Now.

His theater credits include two James McLure plays – Pvt. Wars and The Agent. He was also in a work by Marsha Norman, The Holdup. All were performed at Timothy and Buck Busfield's "B" St. Theater in Sacramento, California, during the 1992 and 1993 seasons.

In 2008, he worked in Dallas, Texas, on a short film, The Keith Coogan Experience. On January 1, 2010, Coogan started the "Monologue a Day Project", where he learns a monologue or other short piece every day, "as inspired by Julie & Julia", and posts the resulting video performance on blogspot.com.

Coogan was featured in the minidocumentary, Simply Coogan – An Interview with Keith Coogan, released by Coogan on December 13, 2010, which coincided with his birthday celebrations.

Coogan hosted "The Call Sheet" on the SkidRowStudios.com radio podcast network, an entertainment industry-based show that also covered tech news and politics.

== Filmography ==
=== Film ===
Year	Title	Role
1981	The Fox and the Hound	Young Tod (voice)
1982	All Summer in a Day	William
1982	Million Dollar Infield	Vance Levitas
1987	Adventures in Babysitting	Brad Anderson
1987	Hiding Out	Patrick Morenski
1989	Cousins	Mitch
1989	Cheetah	Ted Johnson
1989	Under the Boardwalk	Andy
1989	Spooner	DB Reynolds
1990	Book of Love	Crutch Kane
1991	Toy Soldiers	Jonathan "Snuffy" Bradberry
1991	Don't Tell Mom the Babysitter's Dead	Kenny Crandell
1992	Forever	Ted Dickson
1994	In the Army Now	Stoner # 1
1995	Downhill Willie	Willie Jones
1995	A Reason to Believe	Potto
1995	The Power Within	Eric Graves
1998	Just a Little Harmless Sex	Loudmouth Guy
1998	The Godson	Clumsy Student
1998	Ivory Tower	Russ Dyerson
1998	Evasive Action	Anthony Tait
1999	Dreamers	Rob
2001	Soulkeeper	Tour Guide
2011	Cats Dancing on Jupiter	Fred
2012	Waking	Edward
2017	Limelight	Jim
2018	A Tale of Two Coreys	Marty Weiss
2019	Jay and Silent Bob Reboot	Himself
2024	Don't Tell Mom the Babysitter's Dead	Asher
Upcoming	Chicken Head	Gus Jensen

=== Television ===
Year	Title	Role	Notes
1979-80	The Waltons	Jeffrey Burton	18 Episodes - as Keith Mitchell
1979	Eight Is Enough	Bobby	(S3:E22) - as Keith Mitchell
1980	Eight Is Enough	Vincent	(S4:E26) - as Keith Mitchell
1981	It's a Living	Joey Adams	(S1:E12) - as Keith Mitchell
1981	Little House on the Prairie	Timothy	(S7:E15) - as Keith Mitchell
1982	Mork & Mindy	Scottie	(S4:E21) - as Keith Mitchell
1986	Growing Pains	Scottie	(S1:E16)
1989	21 Jump Street	Kyle DeGray	(S4:E12)
