= Forever (1992 film) =

- Directed by: Thomas Palmer Jr.
- Written by: Jacqueline Giroux; Thomas Palmer Jr.
- Produced by: Jacqueline Giroux
- Starring: Sean Young
- Cinematography: Gary Graver
- Edited by: Jeffrey Fallick
- Release date: 1992
- Country: United States
- Language: English

Forever (also known as Forever: A Ghost of a Love Story) is a 1992 horror-thriller film directed by Thomas Palmer Jr. in his feature film debut.

== Plot ==
A music video director relocates to the home where William Desmond Taylor, a renowned filmmaker from the silent movie era, met a mysterious end. Upon discovering ancient film reels in the house, he screens them using a projector. As the footage rolls, he is greeted by the spectral presence of the performers captured in the vintage film.

== Cast ==
- Sean Young as Mary Miles Minter
- Keith Coogan as Ted Dickson
- Sally Kirkland as Angelica
- Diane Ladd as Mabel Normand
- Steve Railsback as William Desmond Taylor
- Terence Knox as Wallace Reid
- Gregory Scott Cummins as Rupert Simms
- Iain Sanderson as Alphonse Fettuchini
