= Boxley Place =

Historic house in Virginia, United States

- U.S. National Register of Historic Places
- Virginia Landmarks Register
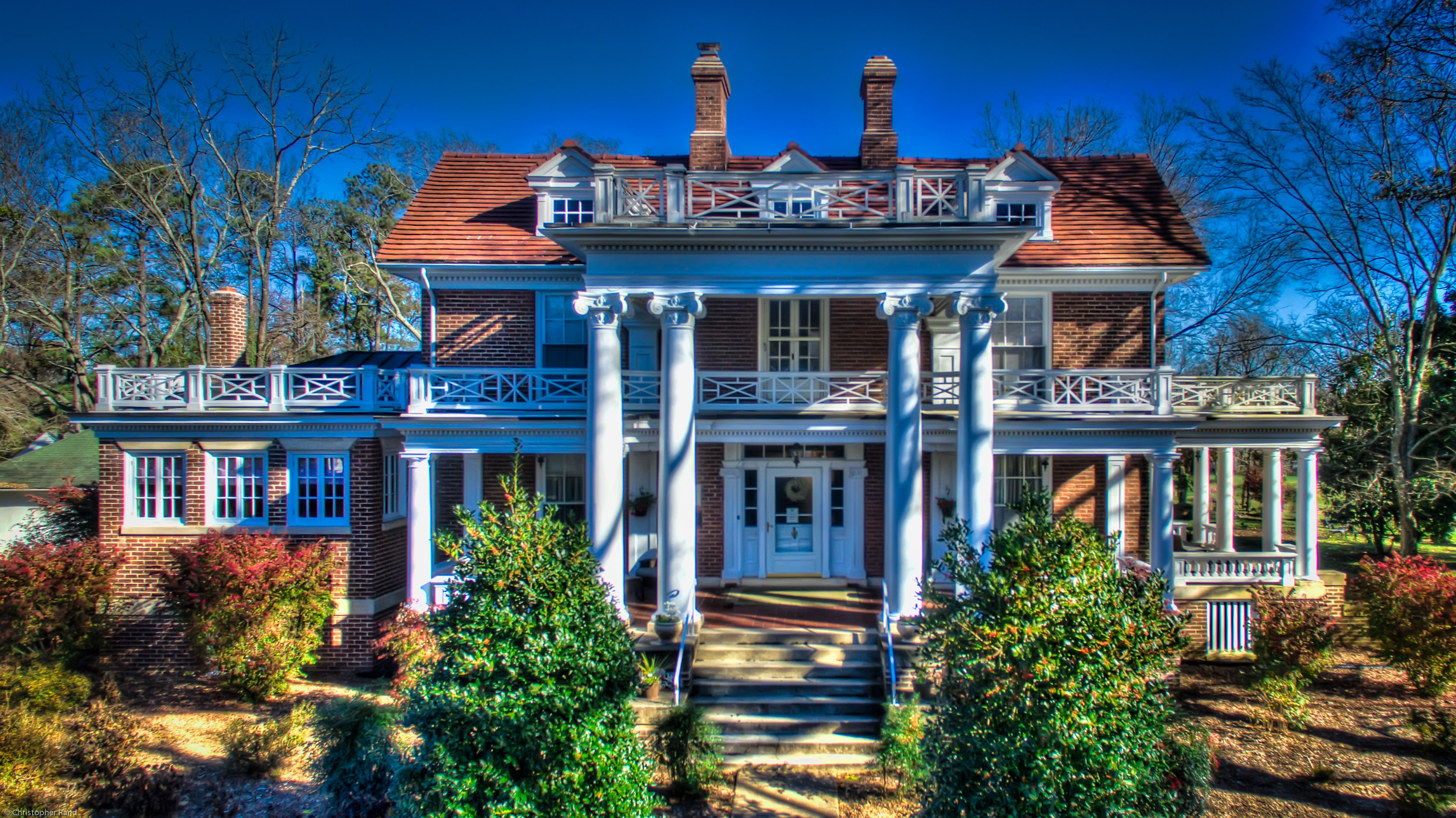

- Location within Virginia Location within the United States
- Location: 103 Ellisville Dr., Louisa, Virginia
- Coordinates: 38°1′39″N 78°0′20″W
- Area: 3 acres (1.2 ha)
- Built: c. 1860, 1918
- Architect: Anderson, D. Wiley
- Architectural style: Colonial Revival, Log Cabin
- NRHP reference No.: 07000273
- VLR No.: 254-0042

Significant dates
- Added to NRHP: April 4, 2007
- Designated VLR: December 6, 2006

Boxley Place is a historic home located at Louisa, Louisa County, Virginia. The original house was built in 1860, as an Italianate/Greek Revival-style dwelling. It was enlarged and remodeled in 1918 by architect D. Wiley Anderson in the Colonial Revival-style. It is a two-story, brick dwelling with large rear and side additions. The front facade features a two-story portico supported by Ionic order columns, with Chinese Chippendale railings. Also on the property are a contributing log house and well.

It was listed on the National Register of Historic Places in 2007.
