= Ednam House =

Historic house in Virginia, United States

- U.S. National Register of Historic Places
- Virginia Landmarks Register
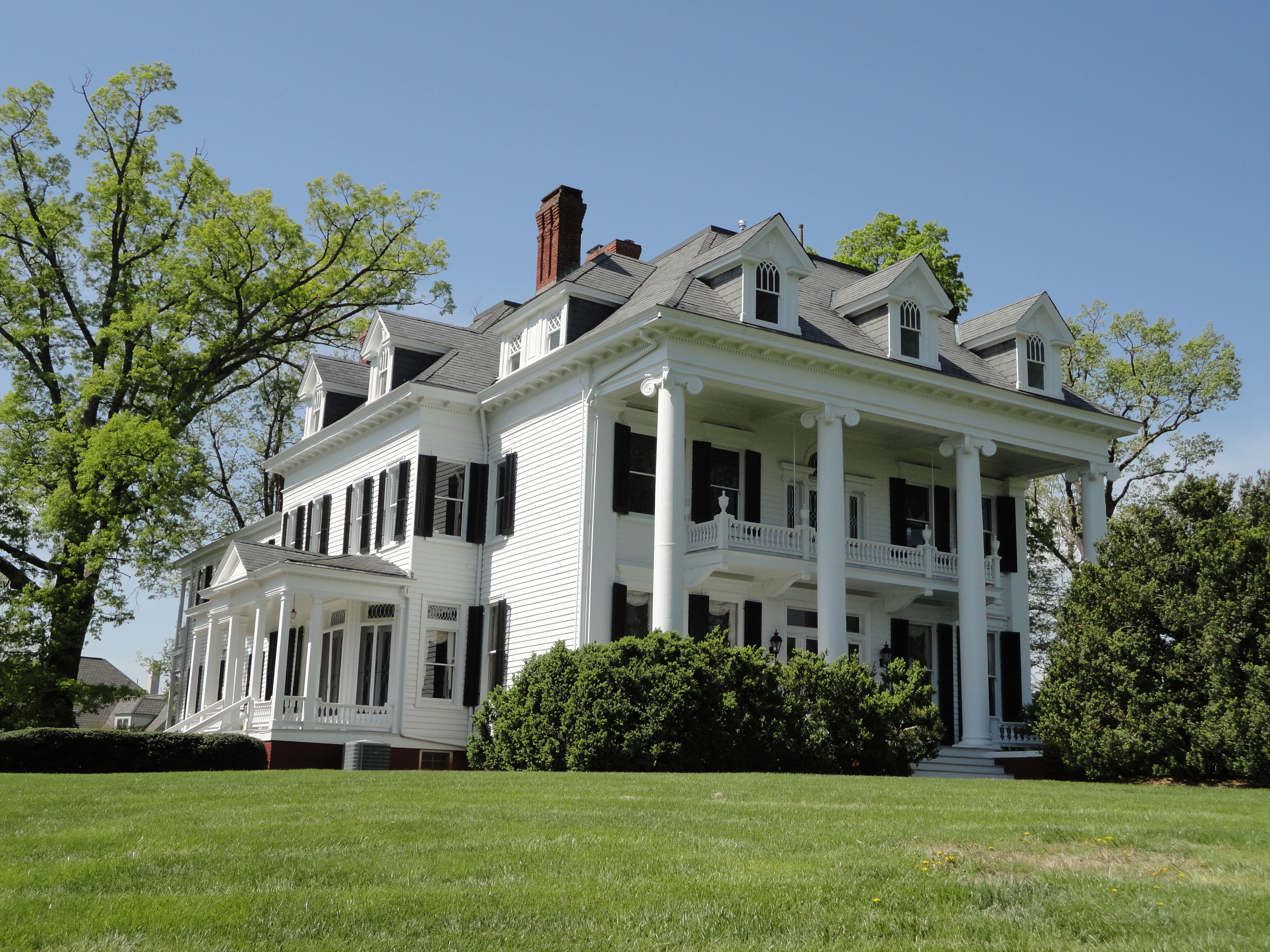
- Ednam House, April 2013

- Location within Virginia Location within the United States
- Location: US 250, near Ednam, Virginia
- Coordinates: 38°3′6″N 78°32′18″W
- Area: 2.5 acres (1.0 ha)
- Built: c. 1905
- Architect: Anderson, D. Wiley
- Architectural style: Colonial Revival
- NRHP reference No.: 82004533
- VLR No.: 002-0560

Significant dates
- Added to NRHP: July 8, 1982
- Designated VLR: December 16, 1980

Ednam House is a historic home located near Ednam, Albemarle County, Virginia. It was designed by Richmond architect D. Wiley Anderson in Colonial Revival style. It was built about 1905, and is a two-story, wood-frame structure sheathed in weatherboards and set on a low, brick foundation. The main block is covered by a steep deck-on-hip roof, with tall, brick, pilastered chimneys with corbeled caps projecting from the roof on each elevation. Attached to the main block are a series of rear ells covered by low-hipped roofs. The front facade features an original colossal two-story portico consisting of four unfluted Ionic order columns.

It was listed on the National Register of Historic Places in 1982.
