= James Dinsmore =

Irish-American carpenter

James Dinsmore (c. 1771 – 1830) was an Irish-American carpenter, known for his work while serving Thomas Jefferson. He was responsible for the training of John Hemings, half-brother to Sally Hemings.

Dinsmore was born c. 1771 or 1772 in Ireland and he emigrated to the United States during the late 1700s, where he became a naturalized American citizen on June 5, 1798. He was hired by Jefferson in Philadelphia, who paid for Dinsmore's tools and travel expenses to Charlottesville, Virginia. While at Monticello Dinsmore worked on the house's interior and was responsible for much of its woodwork. After 1809 Dinsmore left Monticello to work on James Madison's plantation Montpelier, where he and John Neilson worked on the house's expansion. Dinsmore also helped build Estouteville and several of the buildings for the University of Virginia, where he built three pavilions and fourteen dormitories.

Dinsmore drowned on May 13, 1830, in the Rivanna River. His gravesite is unknown, but is likely in or near Charlottesville, Virginia.
