= Miller School of Albemarle =

Boarding school in Virginia, US

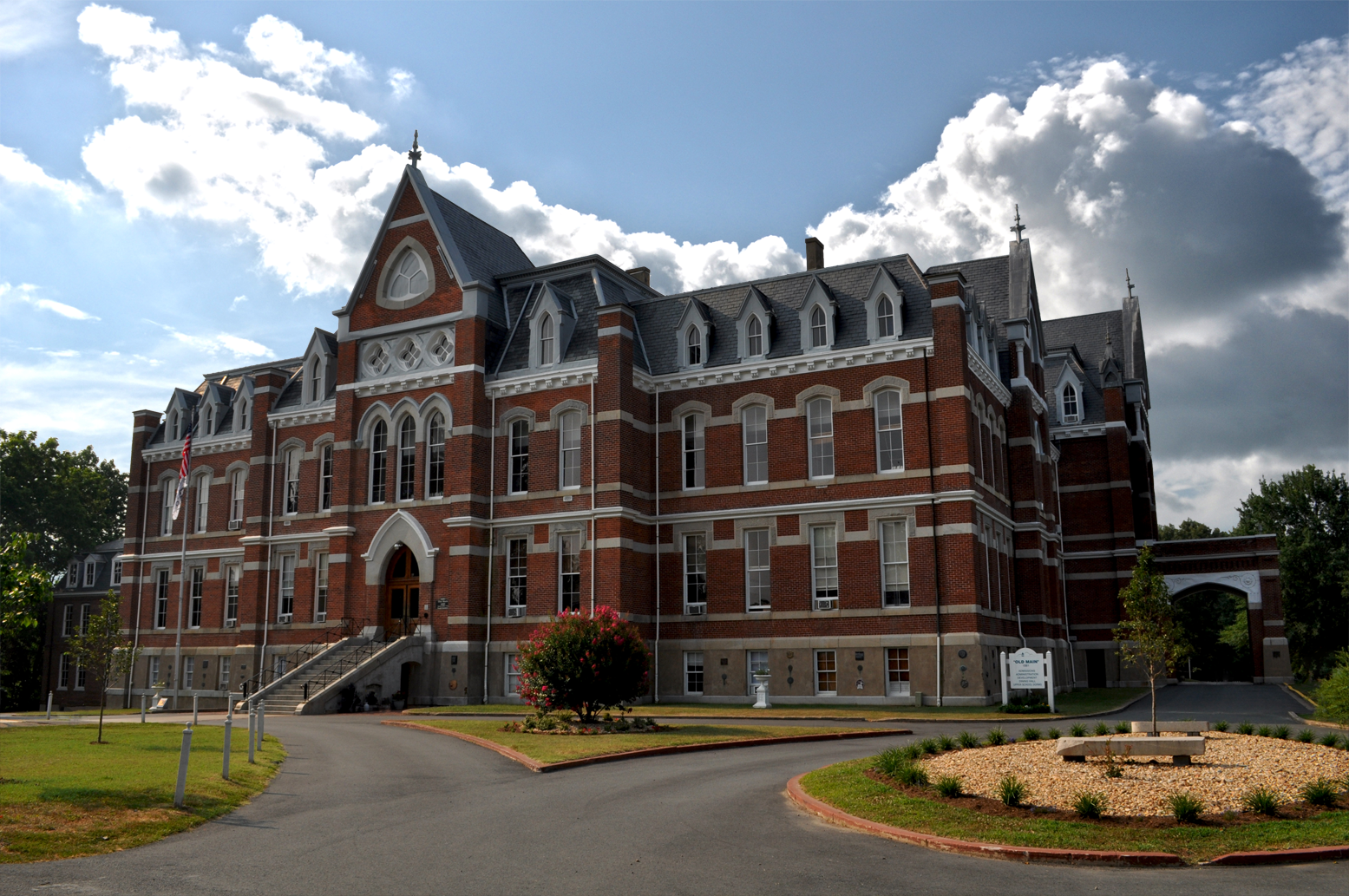

Location
- 1000 Samuel Miller Loop; Charlottesville, Virginia 22903; USA; 38.0059°N 78.7013°W

Information
- School type: Co-ed Day & Boarding
- Motto: Mind, Hands, and Heart
- Founded: 1878
- Founder: Samuel Miller
- Head of school: J. Michael Drude
- Grades: 8-PG
- Enrollment: 255
- Average class size: 12
- Color: Teal
- Athletics: Baseball, basketball, Disc Golf, conditioning, cross country, equestrian, golf, tennis, soccer, volleyball, Road Cycling & Mountain Biking, Softball
- Athletics conference: BRAC
- Mascot: Mavericks (2008-present); Red Devils (-2008)
- Affiliation: VAIS
- Boarding: 30% of student body
- Day students: 70% of student body
- Co-educational ratio: Boys: 52% Girls: 48%
- Curriculum: College Preparatory
- Website: https://millerschoolofalbemarle.org/
- Miller School of Albemarle
- U.S. National Register of Historic Places
- Virginia Landmarks Register
- Area: 90 acres (36 ha)
- Built: 1874
- Built by: Albert M. Lybrook
- Architect: Anderson, D. Wiley
- Architectural style: Gothic, High Victorian Gothic
- NRHP reference No.: 74002102
- VLR No.: 002-0174

Significant dates
- Added to NRHP: February 15, 1974
- Designated VLR: April 17, 1973

Miller School of Albemarle is a coeducational day and boarding school for grades 8 to 12 in Charlottesville, Virginia. Founded in 1878, Miller School is one of the first coeducational boarding schools in America. The 1,100-acre campus includes 15 miles of mountain bike trails, a 12-acre lake, and a 40-acre working farm. 260 students from 15 states and 16 countries are currently enrolled as day and boarding students.

== History ==
Miller School was founded in 1878 with a bequest of $1.1 million from Samuel Miller, who grew up near the grounds where the school is now situated. His will provided for the majority of his estate to be used for the establishment of a boarding school for orphaned children, a school to be located near his birthplace in Albemarle County. By 1874, following Mr. Miller's 1869 death and the resolution of several legal disputes, architects and builders began designing and constructing The Miller Manual Labor School. This work culminated in August, 1878, with a grand opening and dedication of the central portion of "Old Main", an impressive structure of Victorian architecture, around which much of Miller School life still revolves. "Old Main" is now on the Virginia Historic Landmarks Registry. The main building was designed by architect Albert Lybrock.

== Timeline ==
- 1878: The first curriculum was designed; students received instruction in the classics as well agriculture and such trades as carpentry and metal work.
- 1882: The first baseball team won its initial game, a 55-0 victory over Fishburne Military School.
- 1883: Thomas Edison's company designed and supervised the installation of Miller School's first electric power plant, two Edison Style "K" dynamos and 250 incandescent light bulbs.
- 1884: Girls board at the school.

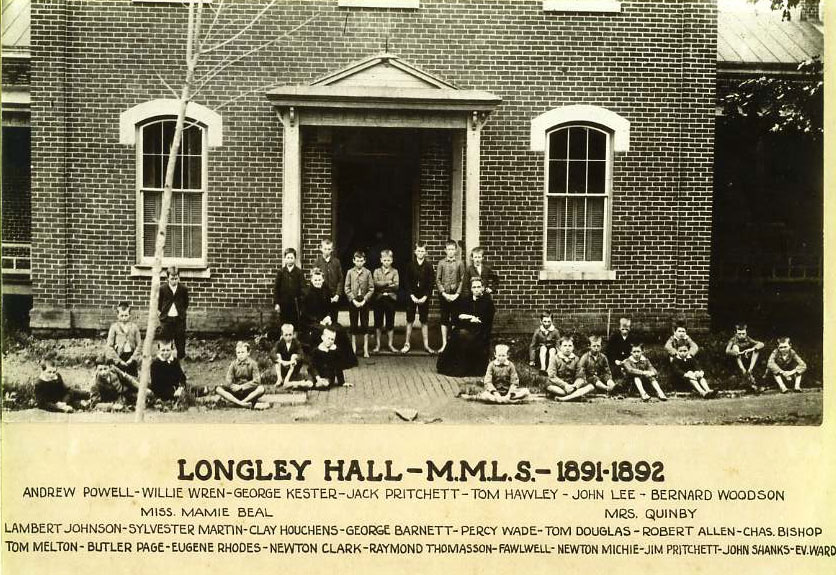
KidsMillerS

- 1927: With mounting operational expenses and little fund-raising, Miller School began to cut its programs; the girls program was the first to go, not returning until the early 1990s.
- 1939: Began to phase out its farming operations and, instead, leased the land to generate income.
- 1948: Won the annual interschool boxing championship.
- 1950: Began to charge tuition to supplement its trust funds, which no longer generate sufficient yearly revenues to support the school.
- 1951: As military schools reach new heights of popularity in post-World War II America, Miller School added military programs
- 1964: 224 boarding boys were enrolled at Miller School, many of them 5th and 6th graders
- 1967: School was racially integrated.
- 1984: Miller became a founding member of the Virginia Association of Independent Schools and charted a course toward a college preparatory curriculum.
- 1992: The school accepted boy and girl day students.
- 1994: A girls boarding program began; the military program was de-emphasized (and eventually eliminated).
- 1999: New state legislation was passed to give Miller School more flexibility and authority in the appointment of members of its own board of trustees.
- 2001: A student was awarded the first-ever Emily Couric Award for Leadership, given annually to a young woman in central Virginia who demonstrated by her good deeds the high ideals, work ethic, and leadership qualities of the late State Sen. Emily Couric
- 2003: A Point Guard was named VIS Division II Player of the Year.
- 2004: The school adopted a Strategic Plan, expanded its Board of Trustees, and recommitted to a college preparatory curriculum, and set up a Development Office.

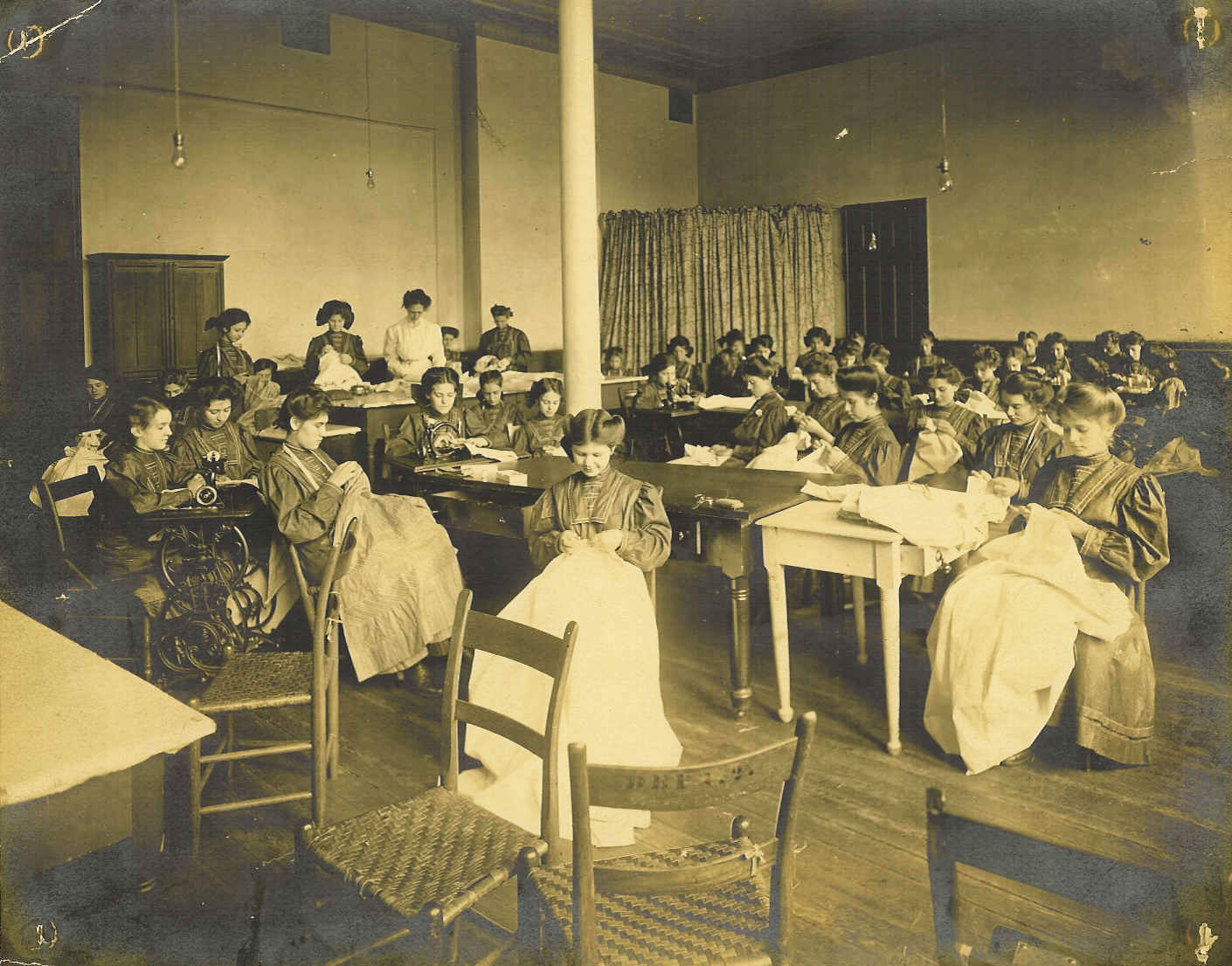
Women at Miller School in 1891

- 2006: A Point Guard was named VIS Division II Player of the Year. The boys varsity baseball team won its first state championship title.
- 2007: The largest senior class in Miller School's history was established with 42 students. The school's historian, Peggy Flannagan, died at 101 years old. A Power Forward was named VIS Division II Player of the Year.
- 2008: School changed its colors from maroon and gray to teal. The mascot was no longer the Red Devil; Miller School's athletic teams compete as the Mavericks. A Power Forward was named VIS Division II Player of the Year.
- 2009: The boys varsity basketball team won its first state championship title.
- 2010: The endurance cycling team is started.
- 2010: The girls varsity basketball team won its first state championship title.
- 2011: The girls basketball team wins back to back state championships.
- 2014: The girls varsity basketball team again wins state championship title.
- 2015: The girls basketball team again wins back to back state championships.
- 2016: The girls basketball team wins the state championships.
- 2017: The girls basketball team wins the state championships, four in a row!
- 2017: J. Michael Drude takes over as Head of School.
- 2017: The boys baseball team wins the VIC championship and VISAA State Championship.
- 2018: The boys basketball team wins the VIC Championship and the VISAA Division II State Championship. The girls basketball team wins the BRC State Championship. 5th title in a row. Boys basketball forward wins VISAA All State Player of the Year. Girls basketball guard wins VISAA All State Player of the Year. Baseball team wins VISAA State Championship.
- 2019: Baseball team wins VISAA State Championship.
- 2020: Sustainable Agriculture Program brings farming and agricultural learning back to Miller School.
- 2020: Cycling team athlete wins Junior Men's 15-16 USA Cycling National Championship Road Race.
- 2023: Cycling team athlete wins Junior Women's 15-16 USA Cycling National Championship Cross-Country Mountain Bike Race.
- 2024: The boys basketball team wins BRAC and VISAA Division II State Championship.

== Historic buildings ==
The school includes architecture designed by D. Wiley Anderson. It was listed on the National Register of Historic Places in 1974. The listing includes three contributing buildings on 90 acres (36 ha).

== Honor Code ==
The Honor Code at Miller School is "I will not lie, steal, or cheat, nor will I tolerate any violation of the honor code by any other student."

The Honor Code is administered in large part by an Honor Committee of student and faculty members. The Honor Committee which conducts hearings with respect to allegations of Honor Code violations. These hearings are conducted in private.

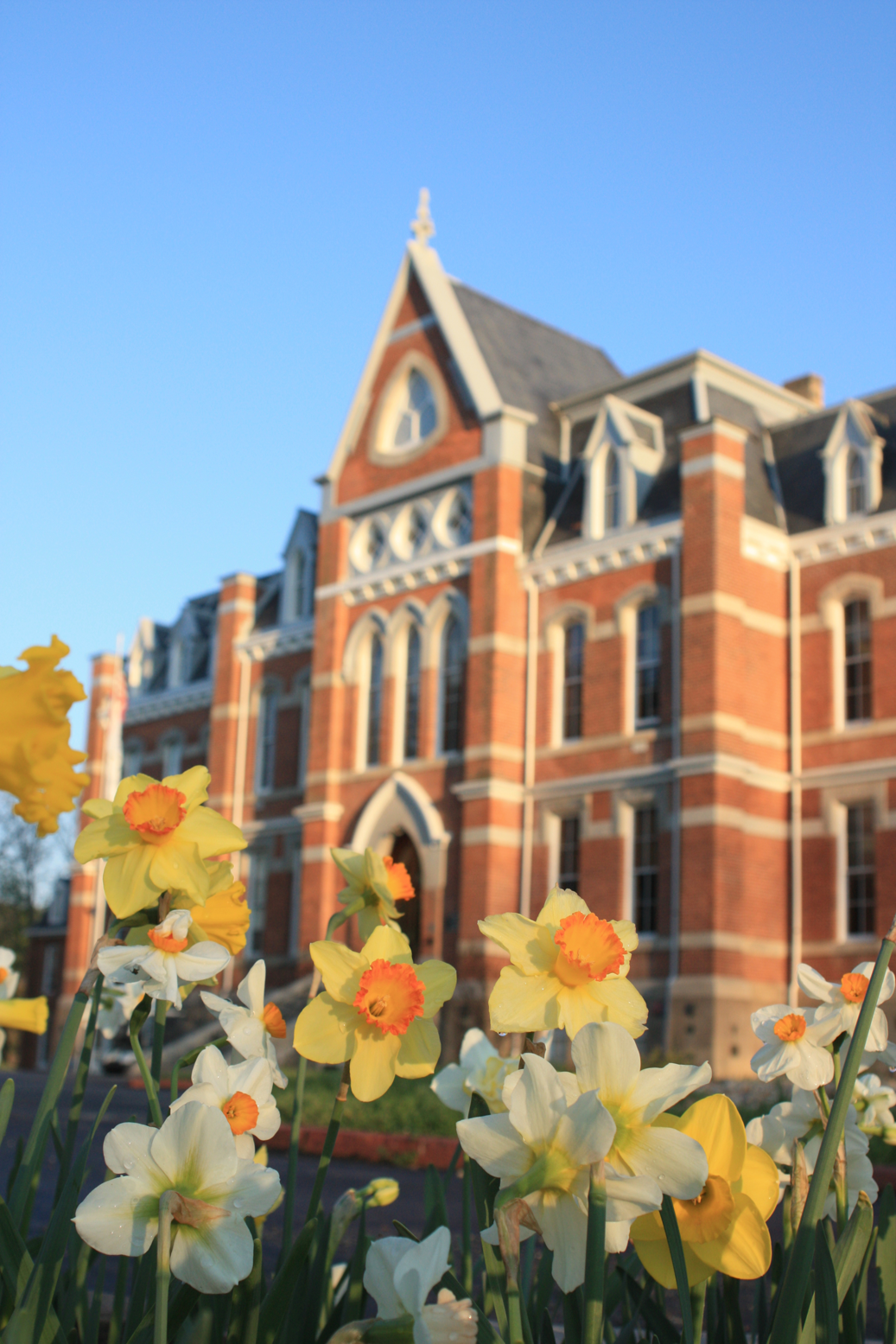
Old Main in the spring.

== AP courses ==
English Literature, English Language, U.S. History, Environmental Science, United States Government, Calculus AB, Calculus BC, French Literature, Economics, European History, Chemistry, Biology, Physics I, Physics II

== Elective offerings ==
Visual Arts, Photography, Engineering, Land Management, Computer Programming, Performance Arts, Woodworking, Music, Sustainable Agriculture, and Drama

== Signature offerings ==
Miller School offers courses in Sustainable Agriculture, Applied Engineering, Design/Build, and Land Management. In January, students participate in the Winter Week of Wisdom and Wonder that includes non-traditional academic and hands-on courses. The Endurance Cycling Team is a 3-season athletic offering that includes road cycling, mountain biking, cyclocross, and enduro mountain biking as well as trail design and building.

== Extracurricular programs ==
The school has a National Honor Society Chapter. Membership in the National Honor Society is based on a combination of factors, including overall GPA, leadership within the school community and service to the wider community. Students who are inducted into the NHS serve as peer tutors during their time at Miller. In addition, the Society performs some sort of community service each year, whether by volunteering with a local organization or raising money to support a local charity. In 2018, Miller School also became home to a chapter of the Spanish Honor Society (Sociedad Honoraria Hispánica), sponsored by the American Association of Teachers of Spanish and Portuguese (AATSP).

"The Hill" is the nickname that students call the campus.

"The Bell Tower" is the name of the school magazine.

=== Boys' baseball ===
The Miller School of Albemarle's baseball program has become one of the most successful in Virginia high school athletics, particularly in the Virginia Independent Schools Athletic Association (VISAA). Led by head coach Billy Wagner, a former Major League Baseball All-Star and Hall of Fame inductee, the Mavericks emphasize a holistic approach to athlete development—focusing on mind, body, and character.

The program has claimed multiple VISAA Division I state championships, with the most recent title secured in 2025 after a 16–3 victory over Paul VI Catholic High School. Senior Evan Hankins sealed the game with a walk-off grand slam in the sixth inning.

The Mavericks have also dominated the Blue Ridge Athletic Conference (BRAC), going undefeated in regional play during the 2024–25 season. The school’s emphasis on elite competition and college readiness has produced numerous NCAA Division I athletes and several professional prospects. Notable alumni include MLB pitcher Drue Hackenberg.

Coach Wagner’s leadership, coupled with facilities and competition, has made the Miller School a frequent destination for collegiate and professional baseball players.

== Student government ==
Miller School has a student government which consists of a student body President, Vice President, Secretary, and Treasurer. Each student grade has two class representatives which represent their classes during student government meetings. The student government works with the school's administration to represent the views of the students in decisions made which affect the student body. The student government works with the school's administration and board of directors to raise money and orchestrate student activities such as dances and balls with other boarding and day schools, and student requested dress down days, which are days where the school's dress code does not apply.

== In popular culture ==
- Used for the exterior and interior scenes of the boarding school attended by the characters in the film Toy Soldiers.
- Used for the exterior and interior scenes of the boarding school attended by the characters in the film Major Payne.
- Used for the opening sequence of the boarding school attended by the characters in the film Morgan Stewart's Coming Home.
- Used for the opening credits fly-over sequence in the film Cry Wolf.
- Used for exterior scenes for the short film, “I Have Love in Me”. https://www.imdb.com/title/tt29720694/
