= Estouteville (Esmont, Virginia) =

Historic house in Virginia, United States

- U.S. National Register of Historic Places
- Virginia Landmarks Register
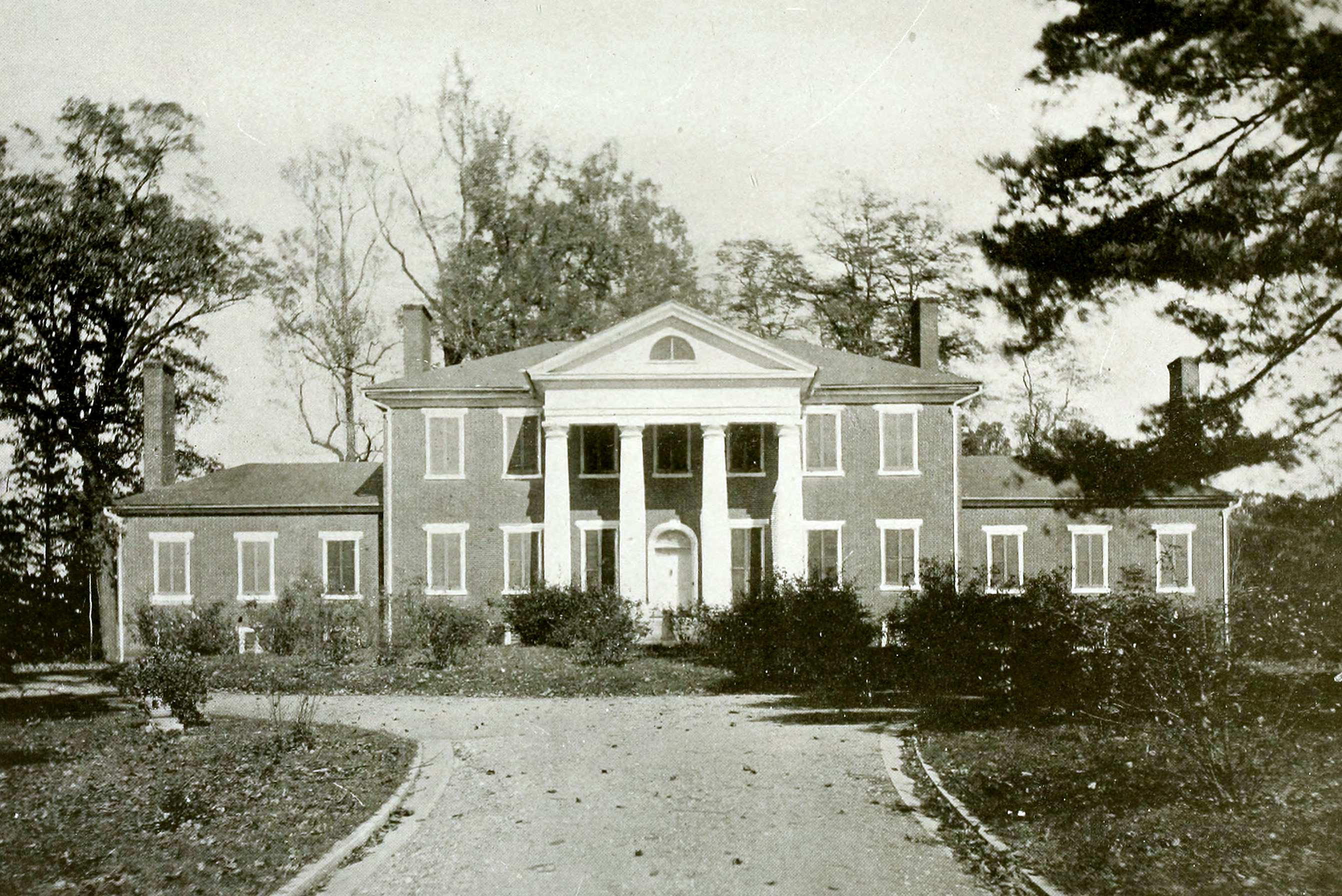
- Estouteville c. 1919

- Location within Virginia Location within the United States
- Location: Southeast of Powell Corner off VA 712, near Powell Corner, Virginia
- Coordinates: 37°52′57″N 78°34′22″W
- Area: 29 acres (12 ha)
- Built: c. 1827
- Built by: James Dinsmore
- Architectural style: Early Republic, Jeffersonian
- NRHP reference No.: 78003002
- VLR No.: 002-0032

Significant dates
- Added to NRHP: January 30, 1978
- Designated VLR: April 19, 1977

Estouteville is a historic home located near Powell Corner, Albemarle County, Virginia. The main house was begun in 1827, and consists of a two-story, seven-bay central block, 68 feet by 43 feet, with two 35 feet by 26 feet, three-bay, single-story wings. It is constructed of brick and is in the Roman Revival style. A Tuscan cornice embellishes the low hipped roofs of all three sections, each of which is surmounted by tall interior end chimneys. The interior plan is dominated by the large Great Hall, a 23-by-35-foot richly decorated room. Also on the property are a contributing kitchen / wash house; a square frame dairy (now a chicken house); a square, brick smokehouse, probably built in the mid-19th century, also covered with a pyramidal roof; and a frame slave quarters.

It was added to the National Register of Historic Places in 1978.
