= Bremo Historic District =

Historic district in Virginia, United States

- U.S. National Register of Historic Places
- U.S. National Historic Landmark District
- Virginia Landmarks Register
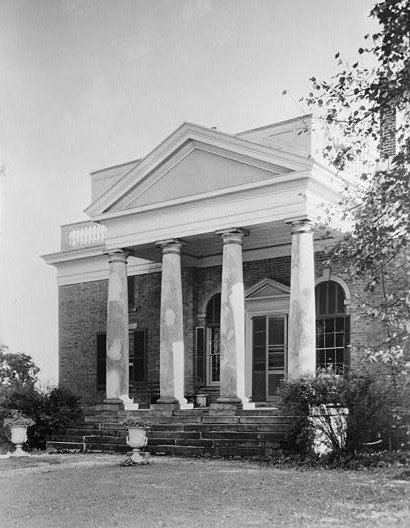
- Plantation mansion at Upper Bremo, HABS photo, 1933

- Location within Virginia
- Location: Bremo Bluff, Virginia
- Coordinates: 37.72542°N 78.32973°W
- Area: 1,500 acres (6.1 km^{2})
- Built: 1725 (Lower Bremo); 1812 (Bremo Recess); 1819 (Bremo Mansion)
- Architect: John Hartwell Cocke; Thomas Jefferson; John Neilson (c.1770 - 1827)
- Architectural style: Jacobean (Lower Bremo and Bremo Recess); Palladian (Bremo Mansion)
- NRHP reference No.: 69000241
- VLR No.: 032-0002

Significant dates
- Added to NRHP: November 12, 1969
- Designated NHLD: November 11, 1971
- Designated VLR: September 9, 1969

Bremo, also known as Bremo Plantation or Bremo Historic District, is a plantation estate covering over 1,500 acres (610 ha) on the west side of Bremo Bluff in Fluvanna County, Virginia. The plantation includes three separate estates, all created in the 19th century by the planter, soldier, and reformer John Hartwell Cocke on his family's 1725 land grant. The large neo-palladian mansion at "Upper" Bremo was designed by Cocke in consultation with John Neilson, a master joiner for Thomas Jefferson's Monticello. The Historic District also includes two smaller residences known as Lower Bremo and Bremo Recess.

The plantation, which overlooks the James River, was added to the National Register of Historic Places in 1969 and declared a National Historic Landmark in 1971 for its significance as a well-preserved example of Jeffersonian architecture.

== History ==
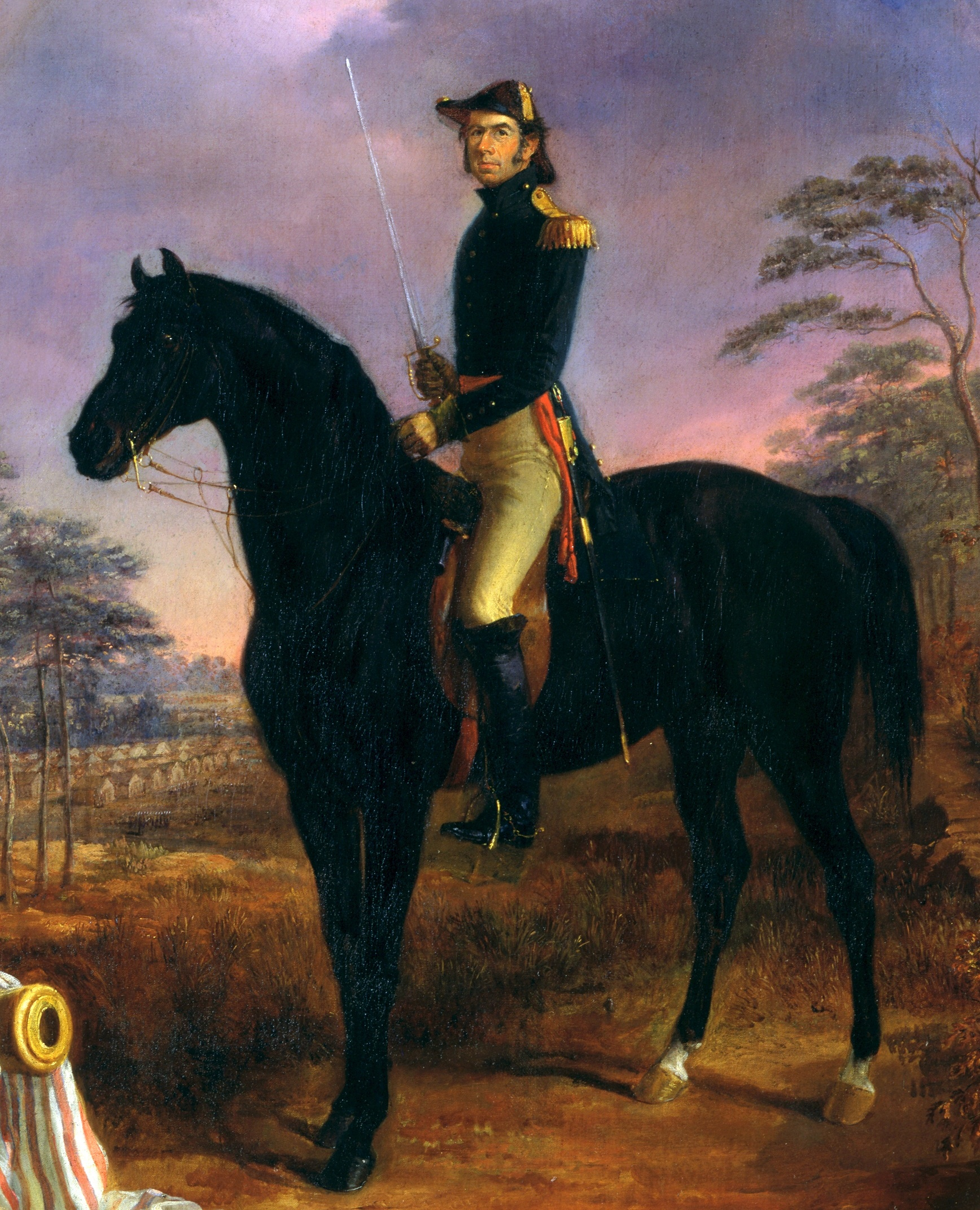
John Hartwell Cocke

Starting in 1808, John Hartwell Cocke built an estate of three houses along the James River, which he named "Bremo" after his family's ancestral home of Bremo in Henrico County. The origin of the name for the first Bremo is uncertain, but may have come from Braemore in Scotland.

=== Bremo in Henrico County ===
Cocke's third great-grandfather, Richard Cocke, immigrated to Virginia by 1627 and amassed almost 11,000 acres of land (including the plantations Bremo, Malvern Hill, and Curles). Richard died in 1666. Old Bremo passed to Richard's descendants before it was sold out of the Cocke family in the late 18th century or early 19th century. R. M. Taylor owned the property in the 1850s before it was sold to Charles H. Senff, who also bought the adjacent Curles Neck farm. In 1913, the property was sold to C. K. G. Billings who developed it into a horse farm. In the 1930s, A. B. Ruddock began dairy operations at Curles Neck and later sold out to Fred Watkins. In 2006, a partnership consisting of Thomas Pruitt and William H. "Bill" Goodwin Jr. bought the 4400 acre Curles Neck property (including the Bremo tract) for $25 million, where it is used today mostly as a nature preserve.

=== Development of Bremo in Goochland County ===
One of the original structures was an ancestral hunting lodge at Lower Bremo that was built of stone and dated back to 1725. Cocke inhabited this lodge close to the river as his first home on the estate.

Around 1812, Cocke completed a larger home for himself and his wife Anne Blaws Barraud at Bremo Recess, situated on higher ground farther back from the James River. This house featured dormer windows, a pointed roof, and later incorporated elements of Jacobean architecture. Anne died in December 1816 and was buried at Bremo Recess, where her ghost has reportedly been sighted wandering in the house.

=== Construction of the mansion ===
During his time at Lower Bremo and Bremo Recess, Cocke began working on the design of a grand plantation mansion to be built at the Upper Bremo area. Cocke spared no expense during the construction, utilizing hand-molded brick. Even the neighboring barn was adorned with columns. The construction of the mansion took several years and was completed in 1819. At about the same time, the lodge at Lower Bremo was renovated for Cocke's son Cary.

=== Civil War years ===
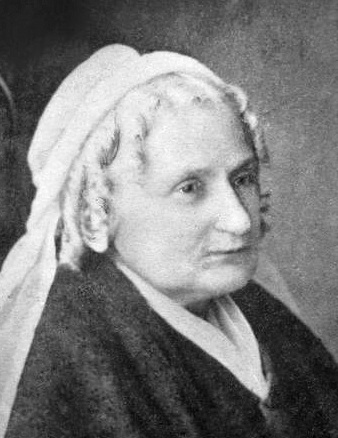
Mary Anna Custis Lee

During the American Civil War, Mary Anna Custis Lee, the wife of Confederate General Robert E. Lee, stayed at Bremo as a guest of the Cocke family. Though it was 80 miles (130 km) away from her home in Richmond, Virginia, the James River and Kanawha Canal permitted a relatively comfortable trip by boat. Bremo also did not suffer the wartime shortages that had been plaguing Richmond. However, within a few days of her arrival, Lee's health suffered a setback because of a severe fall from her crutches on the finely polished floor. Family friend Doctor Cary Charles Cocke built a special bed to accommodate her affliction from rheumatoid arthritis. She was usually accompanied by her son Rob and daughters Agnes and Mildred.

Bremo itself did not escape the effect of the war. On March 8, 1865, the estate was raided by Union forces. General Lee personally visited the plantation that year. The Lees stayed intermittently at Bremo until November 1865, after the war. The place that was occupied by Mary Anna Custis Lee is still called "Mrs. Lee’s room".

== Architecture ==
The overall design of the mansion was initiated by John Hartwell Cocke with master builder John Neilson (c.1770 - 1827), who had worked with Thomas Jefferson on Monticello. The architecture is believed to be based on the Palladian style utilized by Jefferson. Although the original plans were destroyed in a fire in 1894, students of Jeffersonian architecture who had seen the drawings said that they had recognized them as the work of Jefferson himself. It has been called "the most magnificent conception of a house" in America.

The mansion is one story high at its northern entrance, but has two stories on the southern side where the land slopes down towards the James River. The home is designed with distinct elements of Jeffersonian architecture, such as upper windows built at floor level to reduce the visual scale of the structure. The landscaping incorporates ha-has, which were dug out of the view from the mansion while serving to keep livestock from wandering into the yard.

A monument on the estate, named Temperance Spring, is an early example, in miniature, of the Greek Revival style. The homes at Lower Bremo and Bremo Recess were rebuilt in their present Jacobean forms in 1844.

== See also ==
- Bremo Slave Chapel, built for the plantation slaves at Bremo Bluff.
- List of National Historic Landmarks in Virginia
- National Register of Historic Places listings in Fluvanna County, Virginia
- List of plantations in the United States
- List of reportedly haunted locations in the United States
