= Ednam, Virginia =

Unincorporated community in Virginia, United States

Ednam
- Unincorporated community
- Location within the Commonwealth of Virginia Ednam (the United States)
- Coordinates: 38°03′04″N 78°32′19″W
- Country: United States
- State: Virginia
- County: Albemarle
- Time zone: UTC−5 (Eastern (EST))
  - Summer (DST): UTC−4 (EDT)
- GNIS feature ID: 1675243

Ednam is an unincorporated community in Albemarle County, Virginia, United States.

Ednam House was added to the National Register of Historic Places in 1982.
