= Bremo Bluff, Virginia =

Unincorporated community in Virginia, United States

Bremo Bluff
- Unincorporated community
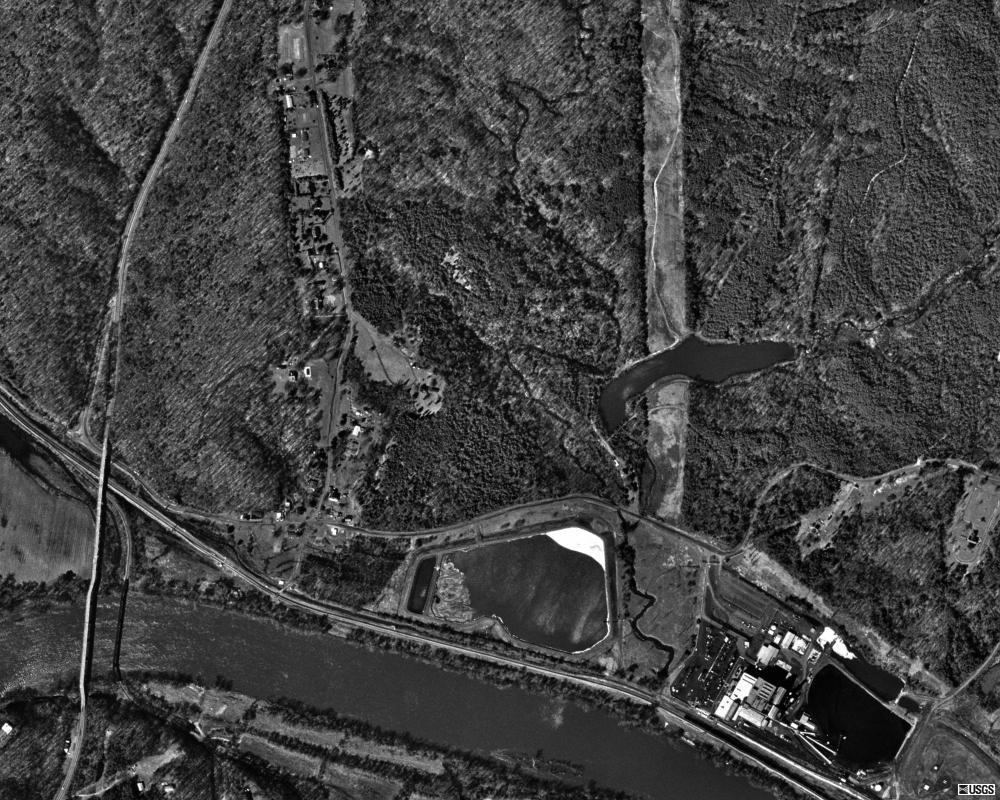
- Aerial photo of Bremo Bluff in 1994

- Location within the Commonwealth of Virginia Bremo Bluff (the United States)
- Coordinates: 37.712°N 78.298°W
- Country: United States
- State: Virginia
- County: Fluvanna
- Land patent: March 6, 1636
- Elevation: 452 ft (138 m)

Population (2010)
  - Total: 656
- Time zone: UTC−5 (Eastern (EST))
  - Summer (DST): UTC−4 (EDT)
- ZIP codes: 23022
- Area code: 434

Bremo Bluff is an unincorporated community located on the northern bank of the James River in Fluvanna County, Virginia, United States. The locale was established by the Cocke family in 1636. During the American Civil War, the family of General Robert E. Lee sought refuge in the community. It is home to Bremo Power Station, which, at one point, generated 3 percent of the total electricity delivered by utility company Dominion Energy.

== History ==
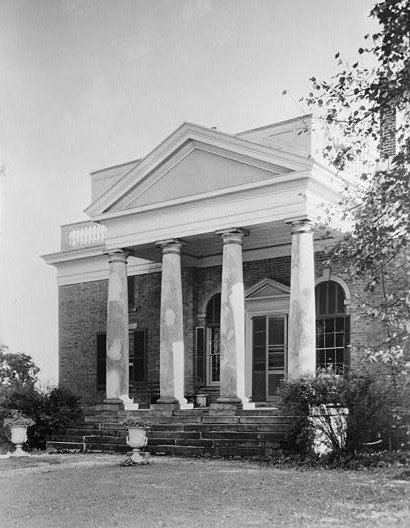
Bremo Plantation

The history of Bremo Bluff can be traced back to the prominent Cocke family of the Tidewater region of Virginia. Richard Cocke, an English immigrant, was granted a land patent on March 6, 1636, that covered 3,000 acres (12 km^{2}) along the James River. The Cocke family settlement was named "Bremo" after their ancestral home of Braemore in the United Kingdom.

To retain their claim as descendants, the brothers Benjamin and Richard Cocke cleared and developed the area of Bremo Bluff around 1725. In 1808, John Hartwell Cocke II began building a plantation estate of three houses, which he named Bremo. He invested in the James River and Kanawha Company to develop a series of locks and canals that began operating around 1840 to improve river transportation. A boat wharf was built to accommodate the river traffic that became an important part of the local economy by the 1850s. However, a series of floods and the American Civil War brought an end to this era.

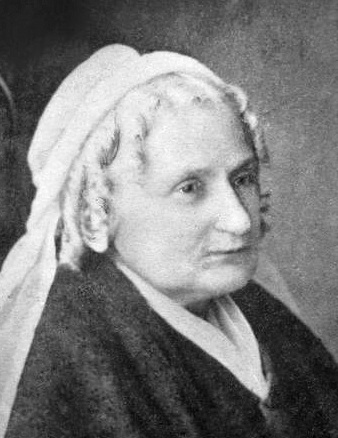
Mary Anna Custis Lee

Mary Anna Custis Lee, the wife of the Confederate general Robert E. Lee, stayed in the Fluvanna County area on several occasions as a safe haven from the Civil War. She spent time at the Bremo Plantation, where her family friend and owner, Dr. Cary Charles Cocke, had a special bed built to accommodate her needs because of rheumatoid arthritis. She was usually accompanied by her son Rob and daughters Agnes and Mildred. Despite the risk of prosecution, Mary Anna Custis Lee and Dr. Cocke taught slaves to read, which was illegal at that time in the Confederate States of America, as they were opposed to slavery.

In November 1865 after the war, the Lee family departed for Lexington, Virginia, where Robert E. Lee had become the president of Washington College. A few months before the death of her husband in 1870, Mary Anna Custis Lee returned to visit the area once again.

=== Industrial development ===
The remnants of the local canal route were acquired by the Richmond and Allegheny Railroad in 1880 to build a new railway. Bremo Bluff soon became one of the five busiest stops for passenger and freight traffic. By 1918, four trains each day were stopping at the town.

In 1931, the Virginia Electric & Power Company constructed a 30-megawatt coal-fired power station along the path of the James River Line at Bremo Bluff. The Chesapeake and Ohio Railway's Strathmore Yard, located nearby to the west, was once a junction to the Virginia Air Line Railway, but was later abandoned. The railway along the James River is now owned by CSX Transportation and is connected by the Buckingham Branch Railroad to Dillwyn, Virginia, which provides the coal to feed the power station.

Bremo Power Station was operated most recently by Dominion Energy. An 80-megawatt generator entered service in 1950, followed by a 170-megawatt unit in 1958. After the original 30-megawatt system was shut down in 1972, total capacity has remained over 240 megawatts, delivered over a 30,000 sq mi (78,000 km^{2}) area. On June 25, 2008, the Virginia Air Pollution Control Board voted to require Dominion Resources to adapt the plant to utilize natural gas. The power station is scheduled to be completely demolished by the end of 2022.

== Landmarks ==
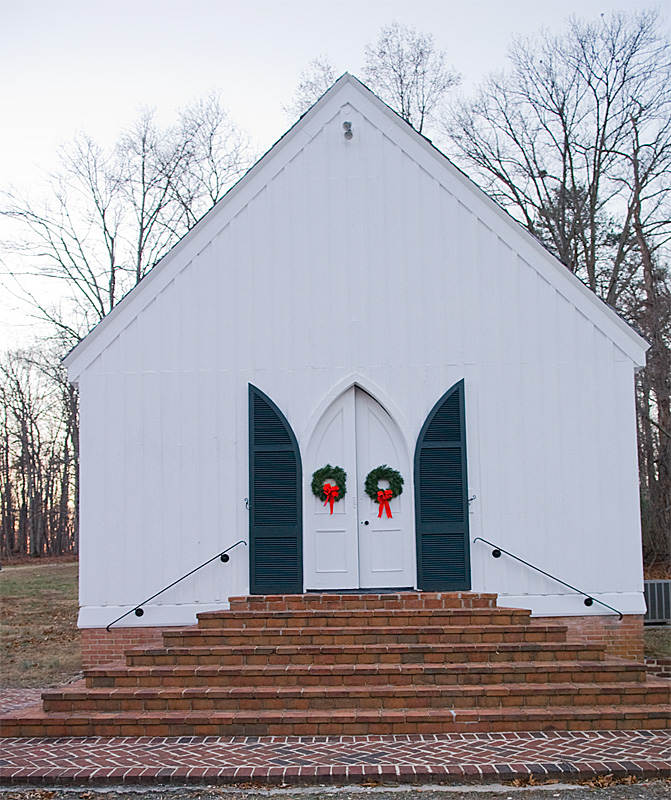
Bremo Slave Chapel

Bremo Bluff can be accessed from U.S. Route 15 and lies across the James River from Buckingham County to the south. The historic area of the village, called "Bachelor's Quarters", is located along Route 657.

Nearby to the west, the Bremo Historic District includes the Cocke family plantation and is a National Historic Landmark. Based on the Palladian architecture of Thomas Jefferson, the plantation mansion was designed by John Hartwell Cocke with master builder John Neilson, who had worked with Jefferson on Monticello. The estate once included the Bremo Slave Chapel, which has since been moved to the center of the Blemo Bluff village and is now listed on the National Register of Historic Places.

Also listed on the National Register of Historic Places are Glen Arvon and Rivanna Farm.

== Demographics ==
Bremo Bluff is part of the Charlottesville metropolitan area. The local zip code of 23022 was populated by 328 men and 328 women in 2010. The median ages of the men and women were 40.8 and 41.8, respectively. The average home value was $56,000 and the average annual household income was $54,396. 129 people were employed across 14 local businesses, generating a total annual payroll of $6,243,000 as of 2010.

== Geology ==
The "Big Sandstone" vein of quartzite was discovered at Bremo Bluff by the Tellurium Mine, which also had been a source of various precious metals since 1832.

== Climate ==
The climate of Bremo Bluff is characterized by relatively high temperatures and evenly distributed precipitation throughout the year. The Köppen Climate Classification subtype for this climate is "Cfa" (Humid temperate hot summer).

Climate data for Bremo Bluff, Virginia(1991-2020 Normals)
| Month | Jan | Feb | Mar | Apr | May | Jun | Jul | Aug | Sep | Oct | Nov | Dec | Year |
|---|---|---|---|---|---|---|---|---|---|---|---|---|---|
| Mean daily maximum °C (°F) | 9.4 (48.9) | 11.6 (52.8) | 16.3 (61.4) | 22.6 (72.6) | 26.7 (80.1) | 30.9 (87.6) | 33.2 (91.7) | 32.3 (90.1) | 28.6 (83.5) | 22.7 (72.9) | 16.5 (61.7) | 11.2 (52.2) | 21.8 (71.3) |
| Mean daily minimum °C (°F) | −5.5 (22.1) | −4.5 (23.9) | −0.9 (30.3) | 4.3 (39.8) | 9.9 (49.9) | 14.7 (58.5) | 17.4 (63.3) | 16.6 (61.9) | 12.4 (54.4) | 5.2 (41.3) | −0.8 (30.6) | −3.8 (25.2) | 5.4 (41.8) |
| Average precipitation mm (inches) | 84 (3.30) | 71 (2.79) | 102 (4.01) | 83 (3.28) | 123 (4.86) | 109 (4.28) | 130 (5.13) | 97 (3.81) | 105 (4.15) | 101 (3.99) | 92 (3.63) | 92 (3.62) | 1,189 (46.85) |
Source: NOAA
