= Louisa County Courthouse (Virginia) =

Historic courthouse in Virginia, US

- U.S. National Register of Historic Places
- Virginia Landmarks Register
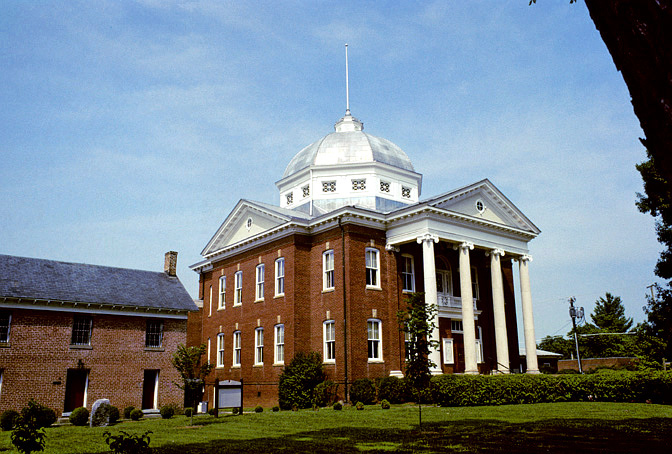
- Louisa County Courthouse, October 2004

- Location within Virginia Location within the United States
- Interactive map showing the location of Louisa County Courthouse
- Location: Jct. of Main St. and VA 208, Louisa, Virginia
- Coordinates: 38°1′28″N 78°0′15″W
- Area: less than one acre
- Built: 1830, 1868, 1905, 1917
- Architect: Anderson, D. Wiley
- Architectural style: Classical Revival
- NRHP reference No.: 90001998
- VLR No.: 254-0051

Significant dates
- Added to NRHP: December 28, 1990
- Designated VLR: April 17, 1990

Louisa County Courthouse is a historic courthouse building located at Louisa, Louisa County, Virginia. It was designed by architect D. Wiley Anderson from Richmond and built in 1905. It is a two-story, five-bay, porticoed Classical Revival brick structure. It measures 59 feet wide and 63 feet deep and features a pedimented portico supported by four Ionic order columns. It has a modified hipped roof topped by an octagonal drum, dome and lantern. Associated with the courthouse is the contributing old jail built in 1818, and rebuilt in 1868 after a fire; the Crank Building (1830); R. Earl Ogg Memorial Building (1917); and a Civil War monument.

It was listed on the National Register of Historic Places in 1990.
