= Bremo Slave Chapel =

Only slave chapel known to exist in the Commonwealth of Virginia

- U.S. National Register of Historic Places
- Virginia Landmarks Register
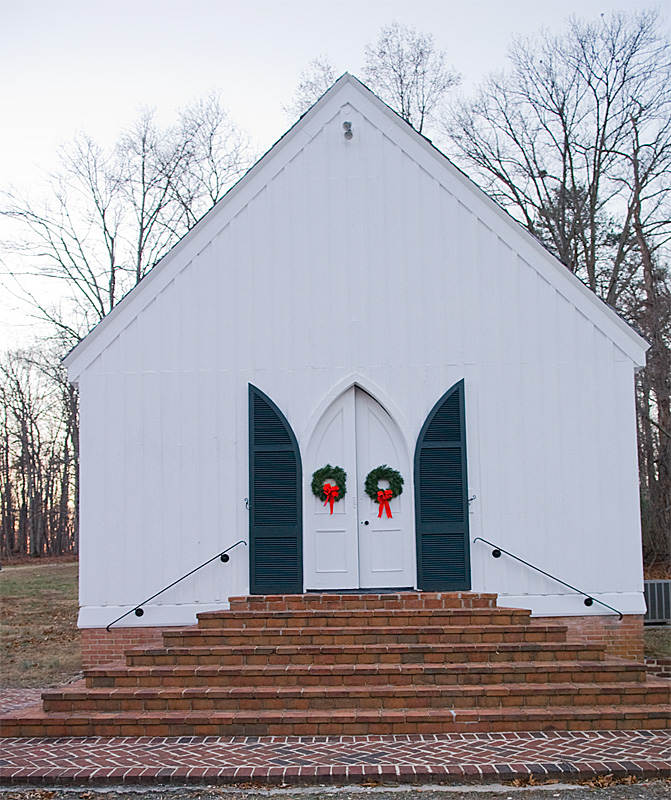
- Bremo Slave Chapel in January 2008

- Location within Virginia
- Location: Bremo Bluff, Virginia
- Coordinates: 37°43′1″N 78°17′51″W
- Area: 1 acre (0.40 ha)
- Built: 1835
- Architect: John Hartwell Cocke
- Architectural style: Gothic Revival
- NRHP reference No.: 80004189
- VLR No.: 032-0030

Significant dates
- Added to NRHP: March 17, 1980
- Designated VLR: December 18, 1979

Bremo Slave Chapel, constructed in 1835 and located in Bremo Bluff, Virginia, United States, is the only slave chapel known to exist in the Commonwealth of Virginia. This Gothic Revival structure originally served as a place of worship for the slaves at the Bremo Plantation of General John Hartwell Cocke. Cocke was deeply concerned with the religious and moral state of his slaves, which drove him to construct this chapel.

The building was moved in the late 19th century from its original location on the plantation and is now used as the parish hall for the Grace Episcopal Church in Bremo Bluff. Bremo Slave Chapel was listed on the Virginia Landmarks Register in December 1979 and the National Register of Historic Places in March 1980.

== History ==
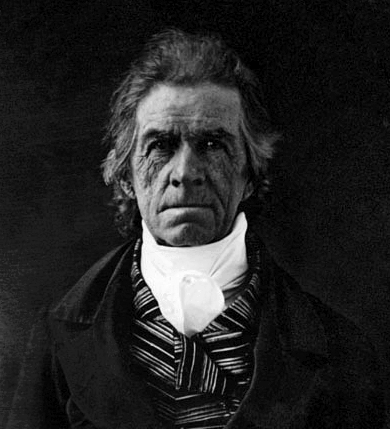
John Hartwell Cocke

Although John Hartwell Cocke owned slaves at Bremo Plantation, he was opposed to the institution in principle and believed it was his obligation as their master to instruct his slaves and eventually return them to the African continent. Cocke first constructed a brick structure on the plantation in 1825 for his slaves, who had been gathering for worship as early as 1821.

In 1834, Cocke began constructing the schoolhouse-style building and hired a student from Princeton Theological Seminary to teach his slaves. However, the instructor left by September 1835 because of local public outcry against teaching slaves. Cocke had been publicly confronted and badly beaten that year for his efforts. Teaching literacy to slaves was illegal at that time in the state. Cocke later recruited young Presbyterian minister Courtland Van Rensselaer to minister to his slaves. Van Rensselaer dedicated the chapel on behalf of the slaves in November 1837.

=== Post-abolition use ===
The chapel was no longer used for some time after the American Civil War. John Hartwell Cocke died in 1866 and slavery had been abolished by the time the plantation was passed down to his surviving son Cary Charles Cocke. In 1881, Cary Charles Cocke, William Cocke and Charles E. Cosby purchased land in Bremo Bluff that would become the present site of the chapel. By February 14, 1884, the building had been moved east from Chapel Field in Lower Bremo to the village center of Bremo Bluff, where it was consecrated as Grace Church by Episcopal Bishop Alfred M. Randolph. Services were held at this location until a newer brick church was built in 1924 and the chapel was moved a short distance to the north, where it was severely damaged by a falling tree the following year. After substantial reconstruction, it has since been used as the parish hall.

== Architecture ==
The identity of the architect is uncertain, but is presumed by the Virginia Department of Historic Resources to be John Hartwell Cocke. The rectangular brick foundation is arranged in a stretcher bond. The building measures 24 feet 5 inches (7.44 m) by 43 feet 4 inches (13.21 m), and is covered by a simple gable roof with slate shingles and three chimneys. The exterior walls utilize board and batten construction. The main entrance on the east side features Gothic double doors; the chapel's sash windows are similarly arched. The interior includes an auditorium, a sanctuary, and a kitchen in the back. The building underwent significant modification during its move in the late 19th century and a vestry was added in the 20th century. Brick facing and steps with an iron railing were added to the front of the chapel in 1966.

== See also ==
- American Colonization Society
- Bremo Historic District
