= Rivanna (unincorporated community), Virginia =

Unincorporated community in Virginia, United States

Rivanna
- Unincorporated community
- Location within the Commonwealth of Virginia Rivanna (the United States)
- Coordinates: 38°07′29″N 78°27′39″W
- Country: United States
- State: Virginia
- County: Albemarle
- Time zone: UTC−5 (Eastern (EST))
  - Summer (DST): UTC−4 (EDT)
- GNIS feature ID: 1493488

Rivanna is an unincorporated community in Albemarle County, Virginia, United States, north of Charlottesville.
