= John Hartwell Cocke =

American military officer, planter and businessman (1780–1866)

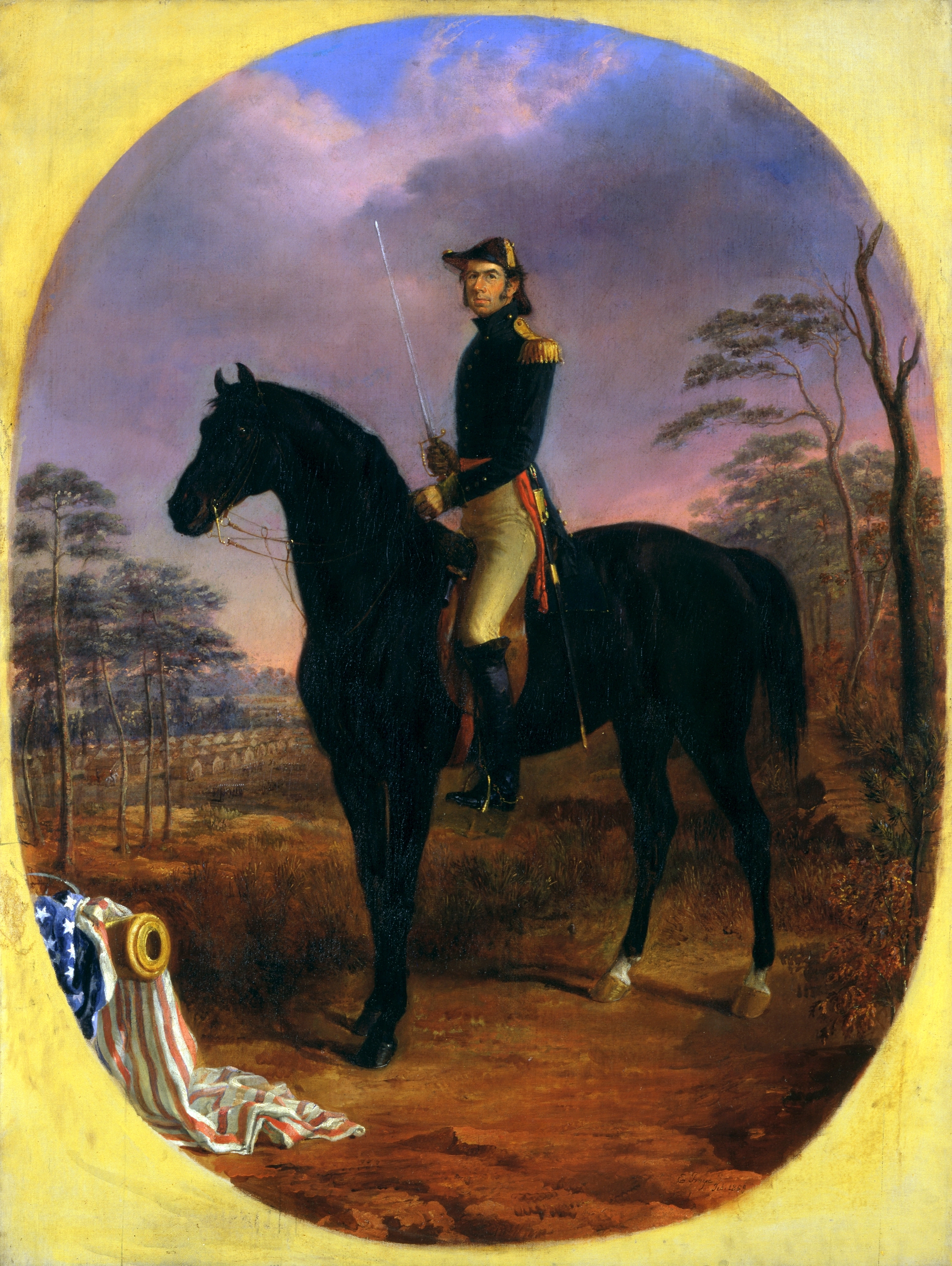
- John Hartwell Cocke of Bremo (1859, Edward Troye)
- Born: September 19, 1780; Surry County, Virginia, US
- Died: June 24, 1866 (aged 85); Bremo Bluff, Virginia, US
- Military career
- Allegiance: United States of America
- Service years: 1812–1813
- Rank: Brigadier general
- Commands: Virginia militia
- Conflicts: War of 1812
- Other work: Builder of Bremo Plantation; Board of Visitors of the University of Virginia

Brigadier-General John Hartwell Cocke II (September 19, 1780 – June 24, 1866) was an American military officer, planter and businessman. During the War of 1812, Cocke served in the Virginia militia. After his military service, he invested in the James River and Kanawha Canal and helped Thomas Jefferson establish the University of Virginia. The family home Cocke built at Bremo Plantation is now a National Historic Landmark.

== Early life and education ==
John Hartwell Cocke II was born on September 19, 1780, at the Mount Pleasant plantation in Surry County, Virginia. With the death of his younger brother Robert Kennon Cocke (who died in 1790 at age five), John became the only surviving son of eight children born to John Hartwell Cocke I and Elizabeth Kennon Cocke. In his direct paternal line, Cocke descended from the English politician Henry Cocke. The elder Cocke had married Elizabeth Kennon, who grew up on her parents' Mount Pleasant plantation in Chesterfield County, Virginia. He became a colonel in the American Revolution. The younger Cocke was orphaned by the age of twelve and inherited his father's plantation and slaves.

At the age of fourteen, Cocke matriculated at The College of William & Mary in Williamsburg, Virginia, staying in the home of Colonel Champion Travis, his guardian. Cocke was graduated from William & Mary as a member of the university's class of 1798. In 1801, having reached legal majority, he assumed full control of his inheritance.

== Personal life ==
Cocke married Anne Blaus (or Blaws) Barraud in Norfolk, Virginia, on December 25, 1802. Her father, Philip Barraud, was a physician who practiced medicine in Williamsburg, where Cocke had studied. Anne stayed in Norfolk until March 1803, while Cocke renovated the plantation home in Surry County. The Cockes had a son, John Hartwell Cocke III, in 1804 and a daughter, Louisiana Barraud, in 1806 at Mount Pleasant.

In 1809, Cocke sold the plantation to his sister Sally and her husband Nicholas Faulcon. He moved with his family to Bremo Plantation, which he had built on the northern bank of the James River in Fluvanna County in the Piedmont. His wife gave birth at Bremo to another son, Philip St. George, in 1809 and another daughter, Ann Blaus, in 1811. After the war of 1812 discussed below, Cocke returned to his estate at Bremo, where his wife bore another son, Cary Charles, born in 1814. However, Anne Cocke died in December 1816, a few months after the birth of their youngest daughter, Sally Faulcon. Anne was buried at Bremo Recess.

== War of 1812 ==
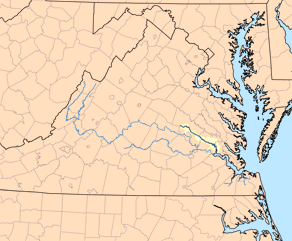
Map of the Chickahominy River (highlighted)

During the War of 1812, Cocke was commissioned as a brigadier general in command of the Virginia militia based out of Camp Carter and Camp Holly. His brigade was composed of companies of troops from Fluvanna County. From 1812 to 1813, Cocke led the defense of Richmond against British forces along the Chickahominy River.

Cocke distinguished himself as an officer; the strict discipline he enforced upon insubordinate soldiers was compared to that of Baron von Steuben. Cocke rode a bay stallion named Roebuck during the war.

== Planter, builder and canal advocate ==
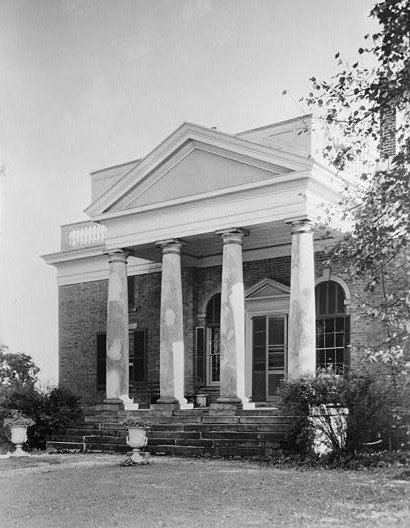
Bremo Mansion

In 1819, Cocke completed construction of a large plantation mansion at Upper Bremo with the master builder John Neilson, who had worked with Thomas Jefferson on Monticello. That year, Virginia governor James Patton Preston appointed Cocke to the first Board of Visitors of the University of Virginia. By the time Cocke retired from the board in 1852, annual enrollment at the university had reached 400 students.

In 1835, Cocke joined the board of directors of the James River and Kanawha Company, which had been established to develop canals to improve water transportation along 200 miles (320 km) of the James River. River transport was critical to the local economy in the following decades, annual flooding made maintenance expensive long before a series of floods and the American Civil War brought an end to this era. Cocke had promoted the canal for decades, which caused a rift with his lifelong friend William Short, who had served as Thomas Jefferson's secretary in France, as well as in diplomatic posts before a longstanding rift with James Madison ended his diplomatic career (despite efforts of James Monroe as well as the aging Jefferson to mend the rift). Short had come to believe slavery was holding back Virginia's economy, and while he had initially invested in the canal in 1795, he had sold his shares by 1820, convinced that railroads would be the way of the future. In 1816 Cocke had written a letter of introduction for a young Virginia engineer, Moncure Robinson to Short, who became Robinson's good friend and respected his comparative engineering of railroads and canals. While Short admired Cocke's namesake son, also a civil engineer, and consoled Cocke when Junior died unexpectedly early, he came to agree with Moncure and European engineers who believed canal technology incapable of surpassing that of the new railroads. However, Cocke disagreed, and by 1836 considered Robinson a traitor to his native state.

Cocke inherited a number of slaves and also was an important player in Virginia's domestic slave trade, helping professors at the University of Virginia buy slaves and renting slaves to the institution. Cocke expressed "continual hostility to slavery" and promoted using "education and skill training" to prepare slaves for freedom and colonization in Africa; as a result, he was once violently attacked by a pro-slavery neighbor. By 1848, Cocke started a second plantation in Alabama as a place for slaves to prepare to colonize Liberia. Though it was unpopular with abolitionists and the black population in general in the United States, he supported the colonization project by sending books and supplies over the years.

== Reformer ==
While his father had briefly served in the state legislature, Cocke's political efforts were on a more personal level. A devout Christian, Cocke participated in several efforts to reform different aspects of society, including temperance by advocating gradual emancipation. He built on his plantation a Temperance Temple, dedicated in 1849 to the Sons of Temperance. This became the model for construction of the main tourist entrance to the Virginia State Capitol in 2007.

Cocke assisted fellow Virginian William Henry Harrison of Amelia County in the formation and running of a school for boys, Amelia Academy, intended to prepare them for admission to the University of Virginia. (Harrison was a cousin of the president by that name.) Cocke served on the board of the school. Harrison's great grandson, John Hartwell Harrison, a namesake of Cocke, followed him in serving on the University of Virginia board from 1966 to 1974.

== Death and legacy ==
In 1855, Cocke traded his mansion for the smaller home of his son Cary Charles on the plantation, where he retired for the remainder of his years.

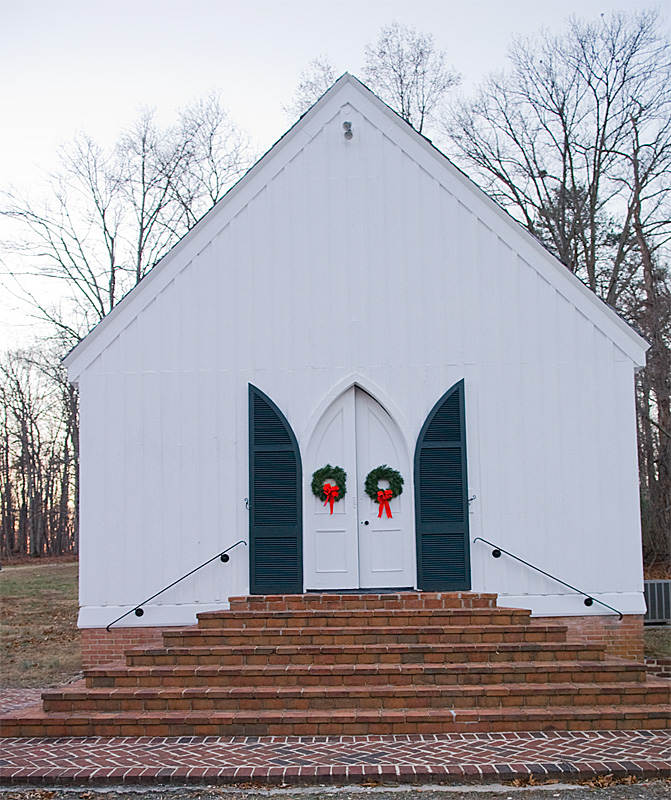
Bremo Slave Chapel

John Hartwell Cocke's son Philip St. George Cocke was commissioned as a colonel in the Confederate States Army, commanding troops at the Battle of Blackburn's Ford and the First Battle of Bull Run. Promoted to brigadier general in 1861, he committed suicide that year before Christmas. He was described as "excitable" and "eccentric," but no one really understood what made him take such action.

In 1881, Hartwell's last surviving son, Dr. Cary Charles Cocke, along with William Cocke and Charles E. Cosby, purchased land nearby in Bremo Bluff to relocate a chapel which John Hartwell Cocke had built for his slaves on the plantation. Consecrated as part of an Episcopal Church, the Bremo Slave Chapel was listed on the Virginia Landmarks Register in December 1979 and the National Register of Historic Places in March 1980. Cocke's plantation was declared a National Historic Landmark as Bremo Historic District in November 1971. He also designed Glen Burnie near Palmyra, Virginia and it was listed on the National Register of Historic Places in 2000.

== Collaboration with Thomas Jefferson ==
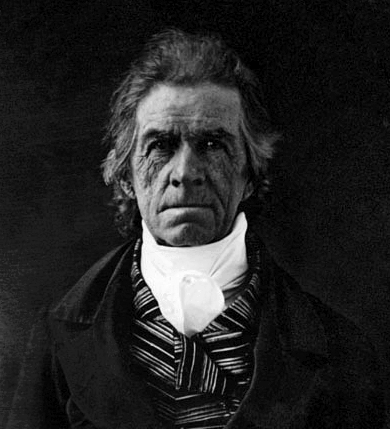
Cocke in the 1850s

Cocke was a longtime associate of former president Thomas Jefferson, and he sometimes traded for items grown at Jefferson's Monticello estate. Cocke collaborated with James Madison, James Monroe, and Joseph Carrington Cabell to fulfill Jefferson's dream to establish the University of Virginia. Cocke and Jefferson were appointed to the building committee to supervise the construction of the new university. Cocke's conservative practicality occasionally clashed with Jefferson's creative aesthetics, such as his opposition to Jefferson's flat roof design, which he thought would compromise the durability of buildings for students.

Jefferson's trust in the younger man was shown by his arranging for Cocke to take over executorship of the will of Tadeusz Kościuszko, a Polish nobleman whom Jefferson had befriended during the American Revolutionary War. On a visit to the United States in 1798, Kościuszko entrusted his pension from the Army and other monies to his friend Jefferson, together with his will; he intended to have his American estate used to purchase the freedom of slaves, including Jefferson's own. After Kościuszko's death in 1817, Jefferson did not immediately act on this will, in part because of his advanced age (he would die in 1826) and in part because Kościuszko had written three subsequent wills, and had relatives and acquaintances claiming that they—not Jefferson—should control his estate. Jefferson attempted to have the complicated legal affair, with its accompanying financial liabilities, transferred to Cocke, knowing that Cocke was also an opponent of slavery. However, Cocke also refused the task. The case of the disputed wills went before the Supreme Court of the United States three times, and in 1852 the Court finally ruled that Kościuszko had revoked his earliest will in 1816, giving his estate to his Polish relatives. Historians have disagreed over the correctness of Jefferson's actions, with some critics arguing that he passed up an opportunity to free all his slaves, and others pointing out that "Kosciusko screwed up," since Jefferson knew that the will was "a litigation disaster waiting to happen."

Since the late twentieth century, Cocke's diaries have attracted the attention of historians because of his writing about Jefferson's slave concubine. The long debate known as the Jefferson-Hemings controversy has related to whether the president had an intimate connection with his slave Sally Hemings and her children. Most historians now believe that Jefferson had a long relationship with Hemings and four surviving children by her. He freed all of them, two informally and two in his will. Cocke wrote of his knowledge that Jefferson had fathered children with his slave concubine. In keeping with the social demands for discretion among planters on such interracial liaisons, Cocke did not reveal his knowledge until years after Jefferson had died. He wrote about the slave concubines:

It is too well known they are not few, nor far between ... Were they enumerated with the statistics of the State, they would be found by hundreds. Nor is it to be wondered at, when Mr. Jefferson's notorious example is to be considered." A few years later, he returned to the topic: "All Batchelors [sic], or a large majority at least, keep as a substitute for a wife some individual of the[ir] own Slaves. In Virginia this damnable practice prevails as much as any where, and probably more, as Mr. Jefferson's example can be pleaded for its defense.

== See also ==
- American Colonization Society
- Temperance movement
