= Rivanna Farm =

Historic house in Virginia, United States

- U.S. National Register of Historic Places
- Virginia Landmarks Register
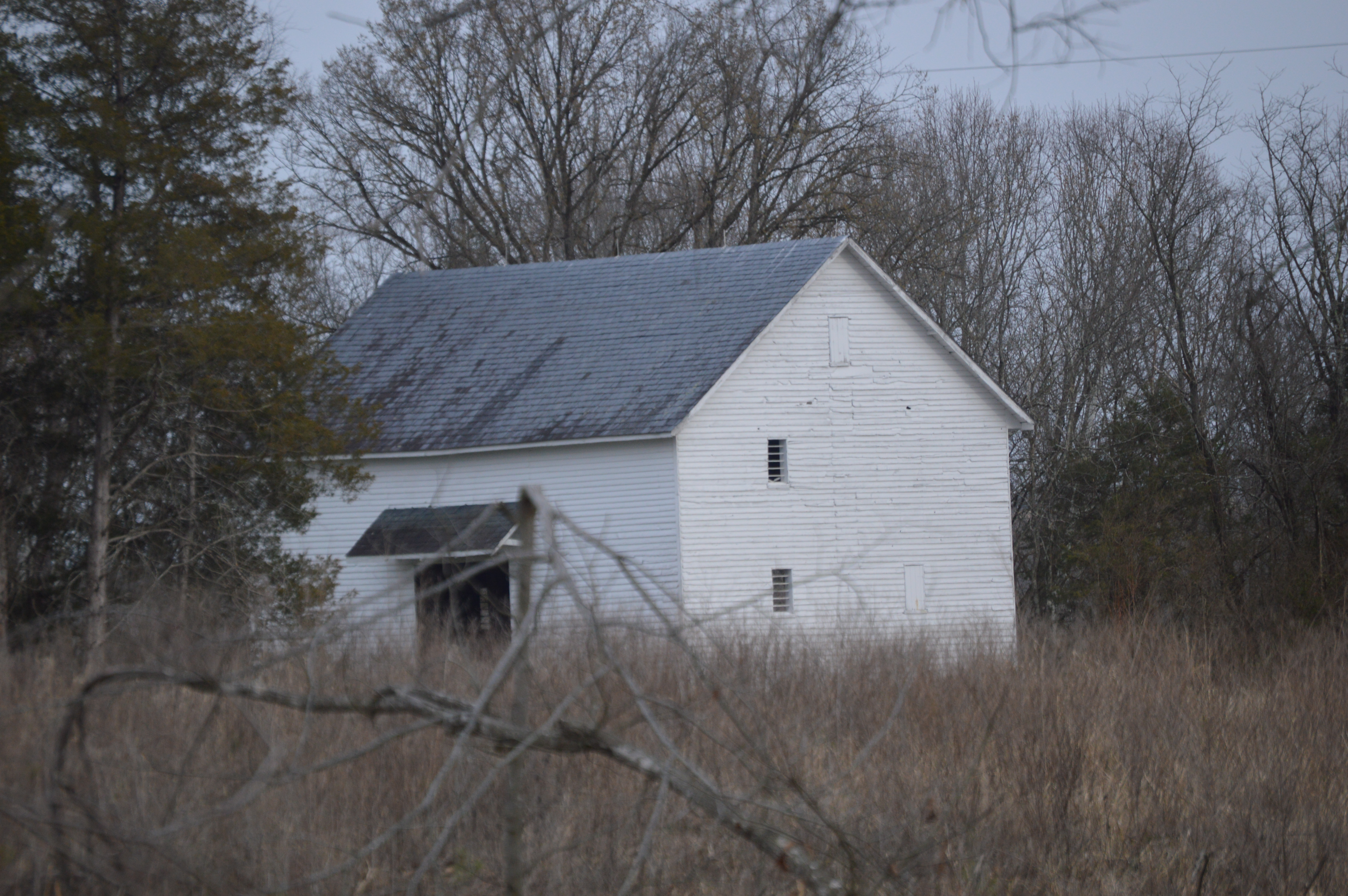
- Barn on site

- Location within Virginia Location within the United States
- Location: Route 1, near Bremo Bluff, Virginia
- Coordinates: 37°44′08″N 78°12′36″W
- Area: 255 acres (103 ha)
- Built: 1839, 1880
- Architect: D. Wiley Anderson; John B. Anderson
- Architectural style: Italianate
- NRHP reference No.: 01000147
- VLR No.: 032-0261

Significant dates
- Added to NRHP: February 16, 2001
- Designated VLR: December 6, 2000

The Rivanna Farm, originally called Eglenton, is a historic home and farm located near Bremo Bluff in Fluvanna County, Virginia. The main house is the work by grassroots builder and architect, Capt. John B. Anderson, father of architect D. Wiley Anderson, who assisted in its construction. It was built in 1880, and is a two-story, frame dwelling in the Italianate style. Also on the property are the contributing kitchen / quarter building, smokehouse, overseer's house, two corncribs, stable, bath house / tool shed, granary, well, and schoolhouse / tenant house. Farm operations started at the Rivanna Farm site in 1839.

The property was listed on the National Register of Historic Places in 2001.
