= Braemore =

Coordinates: 58.250196°N 3.577436°W

Braemore: Scottish Gaelic: Am Bràigh Mòr
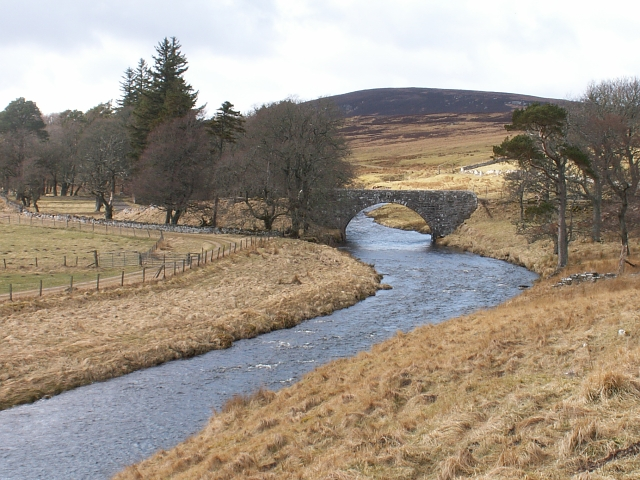
- The bridge across the Berriedale Water above Braemore.

- Location within the Caithness area
- OS grid reference: ND0730
- Council area: Highland
- Country: Scotland
- Sovereign state: United Kingdom
- Police: Scotland
- Fire: Scottish
- Ambulance: Scottish

Braemore (Scottish Gaelic: Am Bràigh Mòr) is a location in Berriedale in the Highland council area of Scotland. It can be approached from the A9 road at Dunbeath.

Braemore Lodge is a 19th century shooting lodge, situation on the site of an earlier church building. The Lodge is a Category B Listed Building.
