= Ceresco, Wisconsin =

Former commune in the United States

Ceresco
- Commune
- Nickname: Wisconsin Phalanx
- Location within the state of Wisconsin
- Coordinates: 43°50′54.86″N 88°51′6.12″W
- Country: United States
- State: Wisconsin
- County: Fond du Lac County
- Founded: 1844
- Dissolved: 1850

Area
  - Total: 2,000 acres (810 ha)

Population
  - Total: 180

Ceresco, also known as the Wisconsin Phalanx, was a commune founded in Fond du Lac County, Wisconsin, United States in 1844 by followers of the communitarian socialist ideas of Charles Fourier. Approximately 180 people lived in the Association at its peak, farming nearly 2,000 acres. It was one of the three longest-lived Fourierist Associations in the United States, dissolving in 1850, and was unique for having assets which exceeded liabilities at the time of its termination.

Since the Fourierist Association had registered their community under state law, the village of Ceresco, Wisconsin survived the collapse of the utopian socialist experiment of the 1840s. Remaining members of the Wisconsin Phalanx later formed a living cooperative and study group called the Ceresco Union in 1855, espousing the doctrines of religious freethought and interpersonal free love until dispersed by a mob of outraged citizens.

In 1858 the remaining inhabitants of Ceresco were annexed by the nearby town of Ripon.

== History ==
=== Background ===
Albert Brisbane (1809-1890), regarded as the intellectual founder of the American Fourierist movement of the 1840s

In 1832 the son of a wealthy New York landowner, Albert Brisbane (1809–1890), a student of philosophy in search of ideas for the betterment of humanity, was introduced to a newly published short work by philosopher Charles Fourier (1772–1837) entitled Treatise on Domestic and Agricultural Association. Brisbane was an immediate convert to the French thinker's ideas, which Fourier somewhat grandiosely ascribed to universal laws governing the development of society, the understanding of which allowed productive enterprise to be reorganized on a rational basis, production expanded, and human needs more readily fulfilled.

In 1832 Brisbane left for Paris to spend two years studying Fourier's system, taking personal tutelage from the 60-year-old theorist himself. Brisbane would make the acquaintance of other devotees of Fourier's ideas during this initial phase of the Fourierist movement, returning to the United States a committed believer and proselytizer of the Fourier's idea of "Association." Brisbane would soon begin work translating and expounding upon the ideas of Fourier for an American audience, with his first and most famous book, Social Destiny of Man, seeing print in 1840.

Brisbane's book was well-received and it enjoyed immediate success, gaining a broad readership among those concerned with the problems of society and helping to launch the Fourierist movement in the United States. Among those who read Brisbane's book and was thereby converted to the ideas of socialism was a young New York newspaper publisher, Horace Greeley, later elected to the US House of Representatives. Greeley would provide valuable service to the Fourierist movement by advancing its ideas in the pages of his newspaper of that day, The New Yorker, throughout 1840 and 1841, and offering Brisbane a column in his successor publication, the New York Tribune, from the time of its establishment in March 1842.

A further book by Brisbane adapting Fourier's ideas to American conditions, entitled Association: Or, A Concise Exposition of the Practical Part of Fourier's Social Science, would be published in 1843. A faddish boom seeking to test Fourier's ideas on "Association" in practice soon followed, and from 1843 to 1845 more than 30 Fourierian "phalanxes" were established in a number of northern and midwestern states. The so-called Wisconsin Phalanx, known to its participants as Ceresco, was one of these practical experiments which attempted to put into practice the Fourierian ideas.

=== Establishment ===
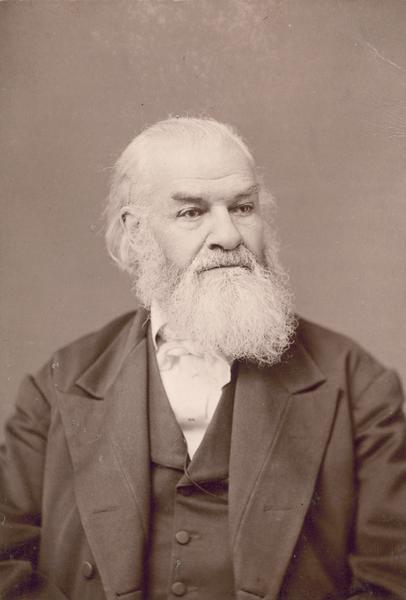
Warren Chase (1813-1891), a founder of Ceresco, later a State Senator and Free Soil Party gubernatorial candidate

The Upper Midwest was not immune to the Fourierist hubbub that had begun to percolate in the United States in 1843. In the fall of that year the Franklin Lyceum of Southport (today known as Kenosha) began taking up discussion of Fourier's ideas in a series of public discussions. On November 21 the society debated the proposition "Does the system of Fourier present a practicable plan for such a reorganization of society as will guard against our present social ills?" After a week's pause, two more successive weekly meetings of the lyceum were dedicated to the Fourier program.

One of those Southport residents most interested in the Fourier system was a 30-year-old named Warren Chase, a future Wisconsin and California State Senator. Convinced of the applicability of Fourier's "Associationist" prescription, Chase committed himself to the emerging movement without reservation, organizing a series of preliminary meetings to draft a constitution for a local "phalanx."

On March 23, 1844, a formal meeting of phalanx supporters was held at the Southport village schoolhouse and officers were elected in accordance with the constitution previously drafted. Five hundred copies of the group's constitution and bylaws were printed for public distribution and a group of three, including Warren Chase, were tapped as trustees of the phalanx, to serve as legal title-holders to all the property of the nascent community. A bond sale of $10,000 was approved and stock in the new enterprise began to be sold. Shares of stock were sold for $25 each, payable in cash or property. By the end of May 1844, membership in the forthcoming phalanx stood at 71.

A domain for the phalanx had been located in the spring, and on May 8, 1844, the decision made to purchase 1.25 sections (800 acres) of attractive government land, located in a valley between two gentle hills. By that fall a total of 1.5 sections (960 acres) were purchased. Instructions were issued to participants to obtain a tent to provide temporary shelter until permanent housing could be constructed, and details for provisioning the settling party arranged.

The group arrived on the site on Saturday May 25, 1844 at 5 pm, naming their community "Ceresco" after Ceres, Roman goddess of the harvest. A total of 19 men and a 7-year-old boy were on hand for the launch, immediately dividing themselves into agricultural and mechanical series, with the former assigned the immediate task of beginning plowing while the latter began digging a cellar for the group's first frame building, intended as the central wing of a structure planned to be extended to 120 feet in length. Upon completion in 1845, the finished "long building" for collective housing would measure 208 feet long by 32 feet wide.

=== Governance ===
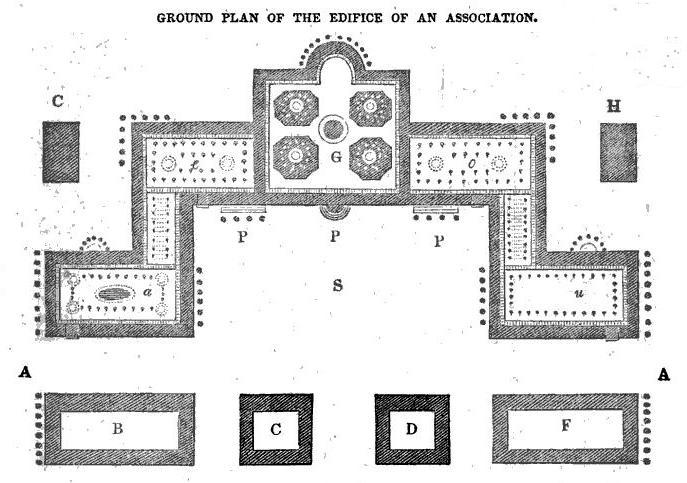
Brisbane's 1843 rendition of Fourier's grandiose Phalanstère. Members of each Association were to live collectively in a gargantuan "edifice" of a distinctive shape. This vast, slender building was to itself constitute "walls" of a large common area. A church (C), meeting hall (H), and storehouses and other buildings (B, C, D, F) were to be constructed beyond the edifice's walls.

According to the constitution of the Association, decisions were to be made by an elected group including four executive officers — a president, vice-president, secretary, and treasurer — as well as a nine-person board of managers. It was specified that these officers could be removed from their positions for neglect of duty, absence, or incompetence. Three trustees were to hold title to the organization's property. The board of managers and officers were prohibited from entering into any contract without the unanimous approval of the community's stockholders.

In accordance with the Fourierist joint-stock system, individuals could participate either as stockholders or as members or as both. No person could be admitted to membership without approval of the board of managers, however, with the board given latitude to set conditions of membership. Membership could be terminated upon two weeks' notice, with those withdrawing from the Association to receive their pro rated share of profits of the enterprise up to that date.

Stockholders were to meet twice yearly. Stockholders received one vote for their first share and an additional vote for each five shares thereafter, the total of votes per individual not to exceed ten. Both men and women were allowed to hold stock and granted the voting rights associated with stock ownership.

Every December the cash value of the phalanx's real estate was to be estimated and any increase declared as payments for labor, divided according to hours worked, or shareholder profits, divided according to the number of shares held. Necessary products and board were to be furnished to the phalanx's members at cost and rent collected for living in the group's collective housing. Individuals were permitted to keep their own horse and carriage on the association's land, with payment to be made to cover the actual cost of animal maintenance.

The elected board of managers was to make the business decisions of the phalanx and to differentiate and assess the various types of work. Whenever five or more individuals engaged in a similar branch of industry, these were to organize as a "group" and to elect a foreman, who would be charged with keeping an account of the work performed by each member of that unit.

Multiple groups in similar pursuits were to in turn organize themselves as a "series" and to elect a "superintendent," who would assess the productiveness of each group in the series. Under the theoretical Fourierist scheme once a community grew to sufficient scale, these superintendents were to constitute themselves as a "council of industry." This elaborate bureaucratic apparatus above the level of groups and foremen remained in the distant mists of Fourierian fantasy due to the small scale of the Wisconsin experiment.

Disagreements were to be settled by arbitration, in which each involved party was to select an arbitrator, with the two arbitrators selecting a third. Decisions of the arbitrators could be appealed to the board, whose decision would be final. This system seems to have been effective, as no lawsuits ever took place between members of the phalanx, or between departing parties and the organized association, for the entire time of Ceresco's existence.

=== Daily life ===
The "edifice" of the Wisconsin Phalanx for collective dwelling was this "long house" more than 200 feet in length. As of 2014 the building was still in existence in its original location, used as an apartment building.

The "domain" of the Wisconsin Phalanx was obtained without incurring mortgage debt. A stream called Crystal Creek ran through the property, with sufficient elevation to allow for installment of a water-driven mill. Quantities of limestone were on hand for the needs of construction and the land selected included a suitable mix of tillable prairie and timber.

Upon arrival late in the spring of 1844 the Ceresco colonists immediately planted 20 acres to spring crops, including potatoes, buckwheat, and turnips before turning to sowing 100 acres winter wheat. Three buildings were constructed by fall, enough to house about 80 men, women, and children. In accord with the Fourierist scheme, which placed emphasis on collective living, cooking was done in a single kitchen and meals served on a single table.

Tents remained in use for much of the first year, with sufficient accommodations finally constructed by the middle of September 1844 to allow their return to Southport.

The family unit was retained, with division expressing itself among the members of the Association over the system of collective living and eating. Permission was eventually given for individual families to be provided with foodstuffs for their own preparation, although the great majority of participants remained committed to Fourier's collectivist model through 1845.

Regular meetings were held for the discussion of business, and social gatherings were frequent.

Liquor was banished from the premises and Chase noting in his December 1845 annual report that "the four great evils with which the world is afflicted — intoxication, lawsuits, quarreling, and profane swearing — never have, and with the present character and prevailing habits of our members, never can, find admittance into our society."

This moral code was enforced by the threat of expulsion, which could be enacted by a simple majority vote of residents. The list of specified offenses for which expulsion could result was extensive, including "rude and indecent behavior, drunkenness, trafficking in intoxicating drinks, profane swearing, lying, stealing or defrauding another, protracted idleness, willfully injuring the property of the association, knowingly consenting to the injury of the association or any individual member thereof, gambling, [or] habitually engaging in censoriousness and faultfinding..."

=== Religion ===
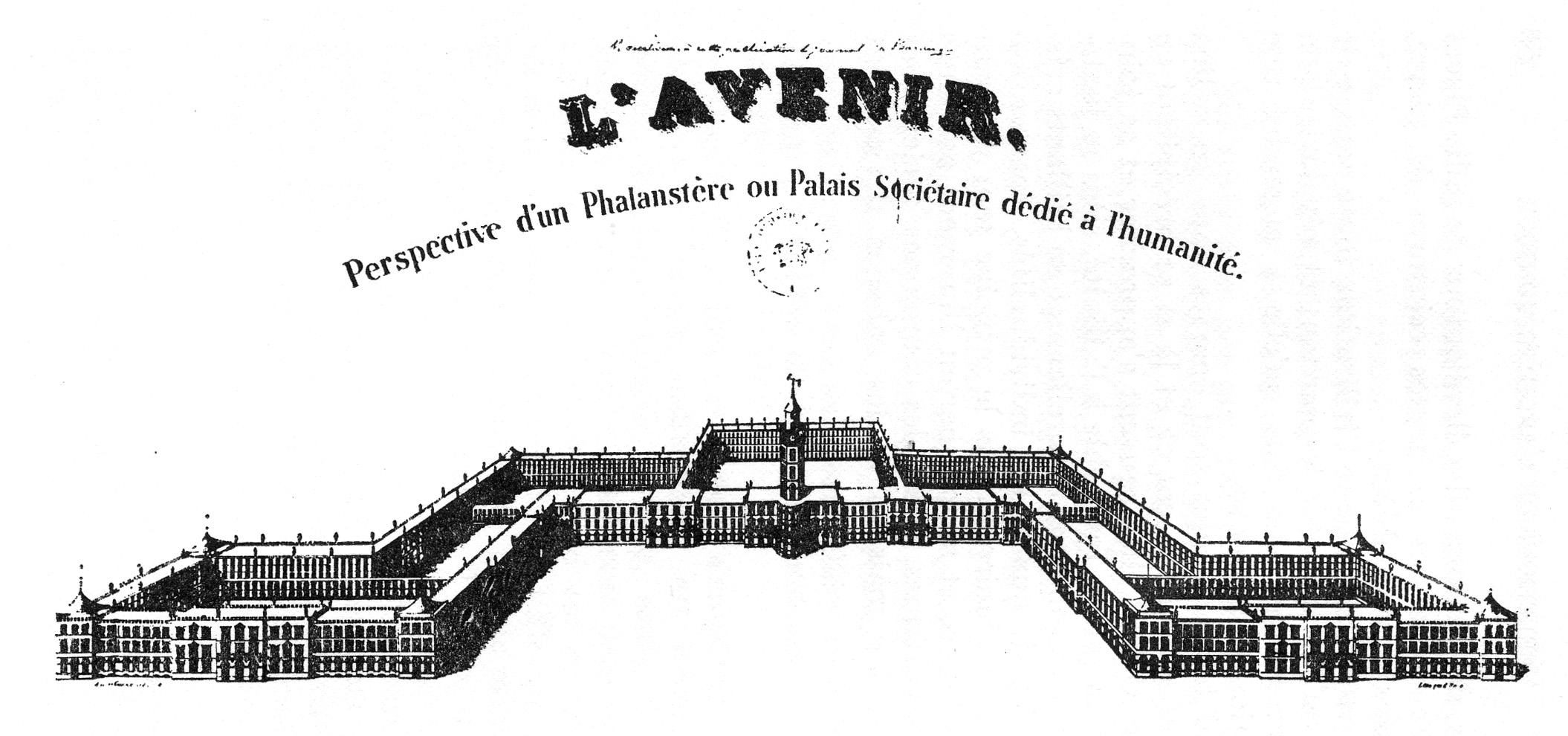
Elevated view of Fourier's concept of the edifice of a phalanstry, illuminating his architectural utopianism. Fourier sought construction of a massive longhouse connecting 1800 residents in a single dwelling, which enclosed common area.

The Wisconsin Phalanx's deep concern with profanity, honesty, and temperance was not accidental. Although nominally secular, American Fourierism was marked with strong religious overtones. American popularizer Albert Brisbane was emphatic in this regard, quoting Fourier's assertion that "The Love of God will become in this new Order the most ardent Love among Men." Not only would the fidelity of marital union be preserved, Brisbane promised, but Association would "respect sacredly the Religious Sentiment, and preserve religious Worship, which is the external manifestation of that Sentiment in the human soul."

Brisbane expanded this perspective at some length:

"The horrors perpetrated in religious wars and persecutions, the atrocities of the Inquisition and other outrages committed in the name of Religion are certainly appalling to contemplate. Struck with these abuses and believing them inherent in Religion, some reformers have wished to abolish it; they have not had the perspicuity to separate the abuses of Religion from Religion itself — to separate the effect of sectarian Fanaticism, acting upon ignorant and deluded minds, from true Religion and the high and exalted sentiments connected with it..."

Unsurprisingly, Brisbane's Christian reformationism found sympathetic ears among Wisconsin's Fourier enthusiasts living at Ceresco, who "were rather religious rather than irreligious," the ranks of which included Methodist preacher Uriel Farmin and Baptist minister George H. Stebbins.

Sunday school and Bible study classes were conducted, with various religious denominations making use of the main hall for their services in sequence. De facto leader of the community Warren Chase emphasized the religious harmony of members of the phalanx, noting in a letter that "although we have many members of different religious societies, they all seem determined to lay aside metaphysical differences, and make a united social effort, founded on the fundamental principles of religion."

Outside suspicions that the Wisconsin Phalanx was irreligious were hotly denied. In June 1848 one member replied to such a charge with a published letter in The Investigator, which declared:

"Some of us are and have been Methodists, Baptists, Presbyterians, Congregationalists, etc. Others have never been members of any church, but with very few exceptions very readily admit the authenticity and moral value of the Scriptures. The ten commandments are the sum, substance, and foundation of all true law. Add to this the gospel of love, and you have a code of laws worthy of adoption and practice by any set of men, and upon which associationists must base themselves, or they never can succeed."

This assessment was confirmed by a Methodist circuit rider who visited the community, who noted that "though a few of the men were professed infidels, they always received ministers gladly and treated them with consideration." Other observers contended that religious observation declined in the enterprise's final years.

=== Expansion ===
Colorized postcard showing the residential edifice of the Wisconsin Phalanx

Ceresco continued to grow through 1846, boosting its debt-free acreage to 1,633 — of which about 800 acres were to be committed to crops. The board was extremely selective with the admission of new members, accepting only one new family between December 1845 and March 1846, despite a plethora of applications.

Warren Chase was ebullient about the phalanx's prospects and spoke of the Fourier system in almost mystical terms, writing:

"Success with us is no longer a matter of doubt.... We feel and known that our condition and prospects are truly cheering, and to the friends of the cause we can say, Come on, not to join us, but to form other Associations; for we can not receive one-tenth of those who apply for admission. Nothing but the general principles of Association are lawful tender with us. Money will not buy admission for those who have no faith in the principles, but who merely believe, as most of our neighbors do, that we shall get rich... With our material, our means, and the principles of eternal truth on our side, success is neither doubtful nor surprising."

Unsurprisingly, educational and cultural projects proceeded at a slower pace than basic construction and agriculture, with a stone schoolhouse eventually constructed in 1845 and a reading room for adult members unveiled towards the start of 1846. A 60-foot long washhouse, a henhouse, and a sawmill during the commune's first 18 months, and a blacksmith and a cobbler practiced their respective crafts. Agriculture remained the chief preoccupation of most members of the phalanx, with a total of 1,553 acres obtained for Ceresco through 1845.

By the end of 1846 the settlement had grown to 180 residents — 56 men, 37 women, and 87 children and youth under age 21. Of these, there were 36 families and 30 single adults. This would mark the peak membership for the Ceresco association. Ominously for the fate of the collective enterprise, only a minority of Ceresco associationists were eating together at the general table by this date, with 100 people part of the 21 families which prepared their meals and ate as traditional nuclear units.

Despite the loss of four families over 1846, applicants still far surpassed the available space, with fewer than one-quarter of prospective associationists admitted to membership in the phalanx.

=== Decline ===
With the Fourierist movement in rapid decline on a national basis in 1846 and 1847, the Wisconsin Phalanx's place became even more prominent in the pages of The Harbinger, the national organ of the Associationists. Ceresco was not immune to the general malaise, however, and its own membership began to slowly decline. Moreover, even the ever-optimistic Warren Chase was forced to admit that "three or four" of the remaining families were "restless, discontented spirits" who were not "contented and happy."

The reality of collective living was a disrupting influence. The merging of family units into one great household and the consequent formation of humanitarian bonds was a fundamental tenet of Fourierism, with Albert Brisbane describing the shattering of familial isolation in enthusiastic terms in his short 1843 book:

"...[A]s man is by nature a social being, he requires, and should form, the largest social unions possible, and numerous and various social ties with his fellow-men. The present system of society is based upon the smallest possible social union — that of a single family in a separate house by themselves. A true Social Order should be based upon large Associations of about eighteen hundred persons or three hundred families, and not upon small Associations of six or eight individuals, or single families."

The reality of tightly shared accommodations, with numerous families occupying rooms in a single crowded "long house," proved less than compelling for many members of the phalanx's resident community. The community was sharply divided over the matter of the construction of new collective living quarters as opposed to comfortable accommodation for individual families, while an increasing number of committed vegetarians made common dining increasingly impractical. Moreover, the lack of a proper reading room galled many of the intellectual members of the group.

As land values escalated and the phalanx's financial status seemed more secure, the board began requiring larger and larger cash investments for admission to membership. Consequently, few new members were gained; energetic workers committed to the associationist ideal without sufficient financial means were turned away. Stagnation was the result.

By the end of 1847 resident membership at Ceresco had fallen to 157 people — 52 men and 34 women and 71 children and youths under age 21. Thirty-two families were in residence, with four families bought out of their investment by the community during the course of the year. The community's flour mill had finally begun operation in June and increased property values helped to keep the Association solvent and a total of 1,713 acres were owned by the Phalanx. Nevertheless, indications of stagnation and decline had begun to make themselves evident.

Those departing were bought out of their original investments by the Wisconsin Phalanx corporation. As the phalanx was heavily invested in land and infrastructure and available cash was in short supply, these payments generally took the form of orders on the treasury payable at some future date, usually bearing 10 or 12 percent interest.

Membership continued to slide in 1848, with only 29 families with 120 people remaining to be counted in the annual report prepared each December. Six families had left during the year and only three had been gained; in addition there had been seven deaths, mostly of young children.

=== Dissolution ===
By the summer of 1849 it had become clear that dissolution of the Wisconsin Phalanx was imminent. Many of those who had not departed Ceresco were interested in obtaining pieces of the communal lands and forming a traditional village on the site. At the association's request, the Marquette County surveyor was employed to survey communal lands into discrete parcels.

Determined to avoid legal action, the community began to liquidate its movable assets to cover the redemption of stock held by departing members. From a high point of $33,000 in stock, by the first of 1850 the total had been whittled down to $23,000 outstanding. The sale of land was blocked by the Wisconsin Phalanx's legal charter, however, which required unanimous consent of stockholders or a legislative act to allow land sale. The latter course of action was followed and on January 29, 1850, the Wisconsin State Legislature passed a bill allowing the association's 9-member council "to sell and convey real estate by their official act; also to lay out and have recorded a village plat with streets and squares and public lots."

Public sale of the phalanx's lands began in April 1850. By the end of the summer most of the land had been sold, with the money received used to buy back outstanding shares of stock, with the formal understanding that any surplus generated over par value would be split by the corporation's former stockholders. A surplus of approximately 8 percent over par was accumulated during the sell-off and distributed to former members according to this formula.

Ledger books were finally closed on the community in 1852, with all assets sold and the proceeds distributed.

The actual cause of the dissolution remained a matter of some mystery among contemporary observers, with Everett Chamberlain declaring that "Human nature was the rock on which this fine ship split, as did all other argosies bearing the banner of Owen or Fourier." Others have shared the view that it was the escalation of property value and a desire to "cash out" profitably which made liquidation of the Wisconsin Phalanx inevitable.

=== Legacy ===
On April 2, 1853, the Wisconsin Legislature passed a statute merging the villages of Ceresco and Ripon and naming the resultant village "Morena." The remaining inhabitants ignored the new name, incorporating as the city of Ripon in 1858.

A new radical living cooperative and study group called the Ceresco Union was established in Ceresco, Wisconsin in 1855. This group promoted the controversial doctrines of religious free thinking and interpersonal free love, offending the conservative moral values of others in the area. This last experimental communal enclave was disbursed by an angry mob one night, which broke windows and doors and caused those being attacked to flee the area.

The papers of the Wisconsin Phalanx were donated to the Ripon Historical Society by Robert D. Mason, the last president of the group, shortly before his death in 1901. Included were membership records, financial records, correspondence, and legal documents such as deeds and mortgages.

== See also ==
- List of Fourierist Associations in the United States
- Fourierism
