= Alphonse Toussenel =

French naturalist, writer and journalist

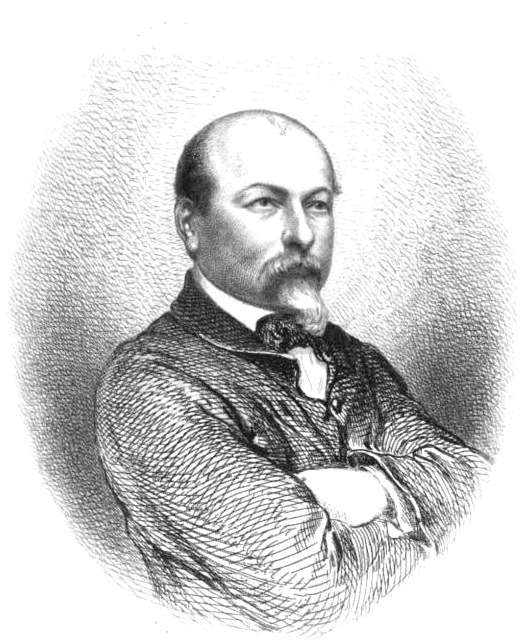
- Born: 17 March 1803; Montreuil-Bellay, French First Republic
- Died: 30 April 1885 (aged 82); Paris, French Third Republic

Philosophical work
- Era: 19th-century philosophy
- Region: Western philosophy
- School: Utopian socialism Fourierism
- Main interests: Political philosophy

Alphonse Toussenel (March 17, 1803 – April 30, 1885) was a French naturalist, writer and journalist born in Montreuil-Bellay, a small meadows commune of Angers; he died in Paris on April 30, 1885.

A utopian socialist and a disciple of Charles Fourier, he was anglophobic and antisemitic. He was at one time editor-in-chief of the newspaper La Paix, and his studies of natural history served as a vehicle for his political ideas. He was also the brother of teacher and translator Théodore Toussenel.

An avowed antisemite, Toussenel's Les juifs rois de l'époque, histoire de la féodalité financière (1845) argued that French finance and commerce was controlled by an "alien" Jewish presence, typified in the influence of the "Rothschild railroad". In this, he drew upon a tradition of French socialist antisemitism (as seen in the earlier work of his inspiration Fourier, and Pierre-Joseph Proudhon).

== Works ==
- Les Juifs, rois de l'époque : histoire de la féodalité financière (1847)
- L'Esprit des bêtes. Vénerie française et zoologie passionnelle (1847)
- Travail et fainéantise, programme démocratique (1849)
- L'Esprit des bêtes. Le monde des oiseaux, ornithologie passionnelle (1853–55)
- Tristia, histoire des misères et des fléaux de la chasse de France (1863)
