= Welch Allyn =

New York based medical company

Welch Allyn, Inc.
- Company type: Subsidiary
- Industry: Medical devices
- Founded: 1915
- Founder: Francis Welch, William Noah Allyn
- Headquarters: Skaneateles Falls, New York, U.S.
- Parent: Hillrom

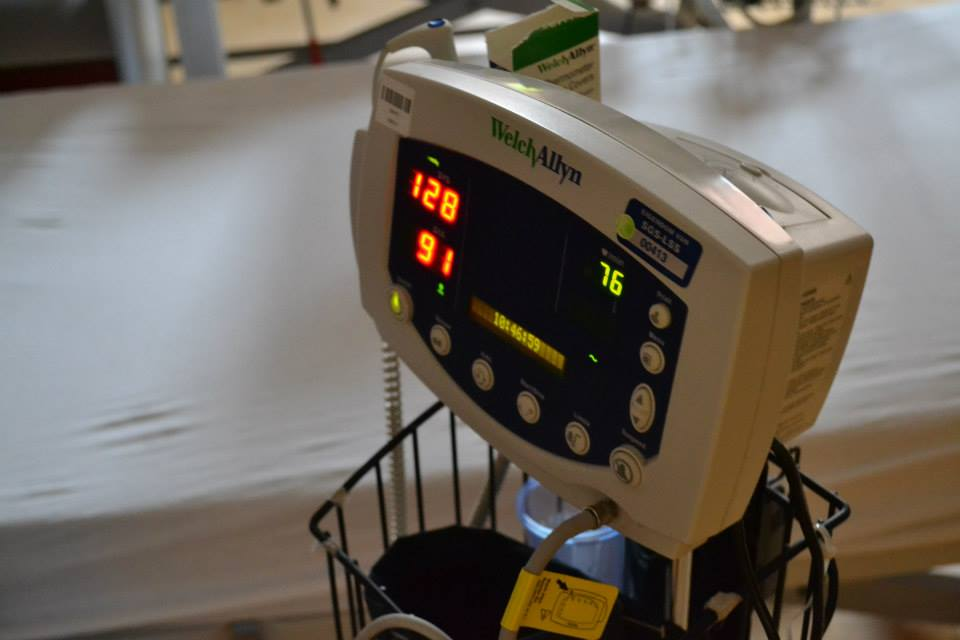
Welch Allyn sphygmomanometer

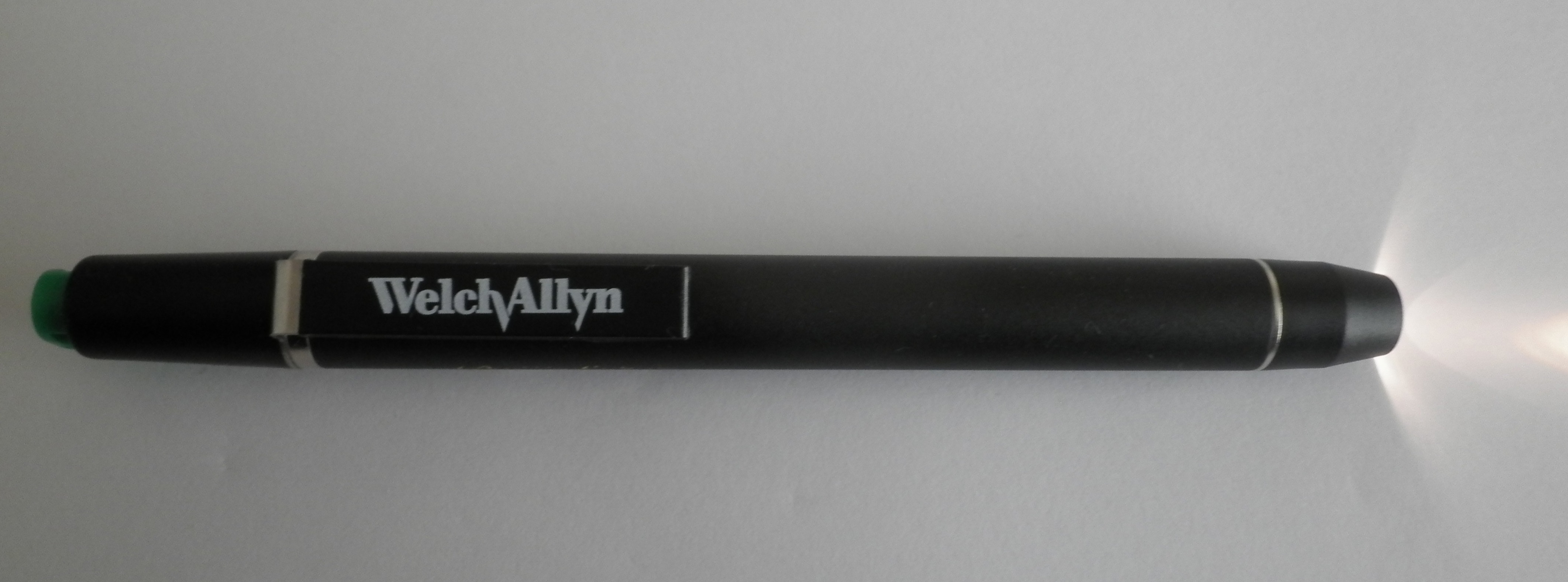
Welch Allyn medical halogen penlight for observing pupillary light reflex and pharynx

Welch Allyn, Inc. is an American manufacturer of medical devices and patient monitoring systems. Headquartered in Skaneateles Falls, New York, it was family-owned until it was acquired in 2015 by Hillrom for $2 billion. Hillrom was purchased by Baxter International in 2021.

== History ==
Welch Allyn was founded in 1915 in Auburn, New York by Dr. Francis Welch and inventor William Noah Allyn. The two formed a partnership and developed the first hand-held, direct-illuminating ophthalmoscope and convinced Allyn, a medical instruments salesman, to form a partnership. The company moved to Skaneateles Falls in 1953, where it is still headquartered today. In 2019, Welch Allyn was awarded a $100m contract to supply the United States military with patient monitoring supplies.
