= American Union of Associationists =

- Founded: 1846; 180 years ago
- Dissolved: 1851; 175 years ago
- Ideology: Fourierism; Utopian socialism
- Political position: Left-wing

Albert Brisbane, leading figure of American Fourierism in the 1840s, as he appeared at the time of publication of his seminal book, Social Destiny of Man (1840).

The American Union of Associationists (AUA) was a national organization of supporters of the economic ideas of Charles Fourier (1772–1837) in the United States of America. Organized in 1846 in New York City as a federation of independent local Fourierist groups, the AUA published a weekly magazine called The Harbinger and published more than 70 books and pamphlets, which helped it to enjoy a brief moment of influence spreading the ideas of communitarianism to a circle of leading intellectuals.

The failure of the Fourierist model in its various practical incarnations led to the rapid dissolution of the Fourierist movement and with it the AUA, however, and the organization rapidly atrophied as the decade of the 1840s drew to a close. The final issue of the official AUA organ, The Harbinger, was published in February 1849 and the final national meeting of the organization took place in 1851.

== Organizational history ==
=== Background ===
The 1840 publication of the book Social Destiny of Man by Albert Brisbane (1809–1890) and subsequent publication of a regular column by him in the pages of Horace Greeley's New York Tribune ushered in a period of popular enthusiasm for the ideas of Charles Fourier in the United States.

American Fourierists were divided between the bookish advocates of "pure" Fourierism such as Brisbane, Osborne Macdaniel, and Parke Godwin — who advocated for the establishment of very specific Fourierist "phalanx" (commune), properly funded and containing between 1600 and 1800 people — and those who sought immediate implementation of Fourierist cooperative ideas at whatever size determined by available funds and the number of committed participants. These practical communitarians, exemplified by George Ripley and his transcendentalist experiment near Boston called Brook Farm, initially held sway.

In the years 1843 and 1844 a faddish boom saw the launch of more than two dozen Fourierism "Associations" (communal economic units) in the Northeast and Midwest. To this were added various "Fourierist clubs" scattered across the country. Most of these efforts proved short-lived and by 1846 the Fourierist movement was already in retreat.

Committed believers in Fourier's ideas did not see a structural cause to the mass failure of Fourierist "phalanxes" (communes) however, instead concentrating on the obvious underfinancing and haphazard operation of the first experiments in communalism. Intent on making a new start, Fourierist leaders sought to create a national organization to share ideas through publications, raise funds, and to concentrate efforts onto the formation of a single properly founded phalanx which would serve as a practical model for emulation. The American Union of Associationists (AUA) was the organization established as the mechanism for coordinating and refocusing Fourierist efforts in America.

=== Regional conferences ===
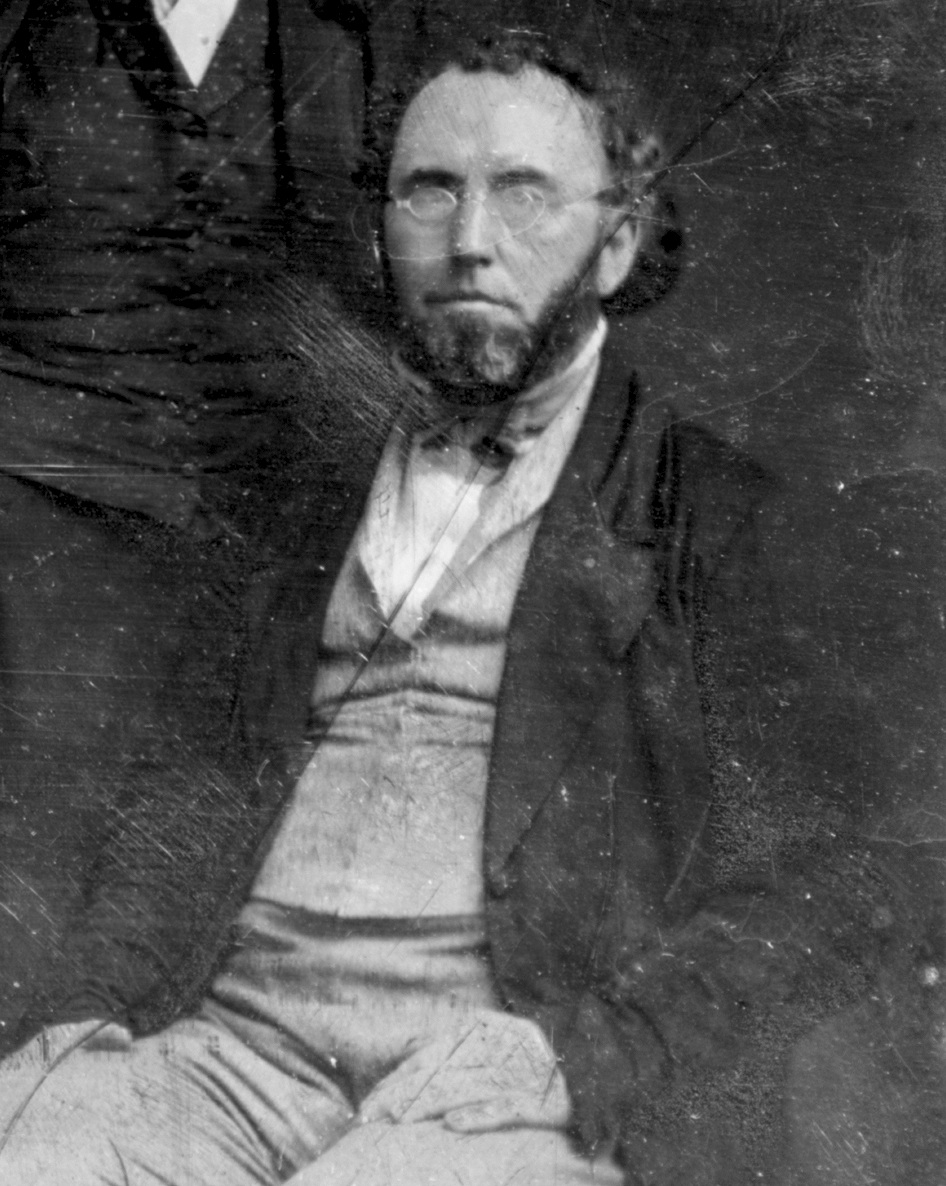
Unitarian minister George Ripley (1802-1880), whose Brook Farm was one of the most prominent communal experiments of the 1840s.

Previous efforts to bring together Fourierist Associations were regional in nature and oriented towards the immediate creation of phalanxes, with three conferences taking place in 1843 and 1844 — one each for the Midwest, New York City, and New England. The so-called Western Fourier Convention, held in Pittsburgh in September 1843, was intended to concentrate the efforts of participants upon one "Model Western Association" but owing to personal jealousies, local rivalries, and fundamental philosophical differences ultimately lead to the formation of four small and impoverished experiments in the states of Ohio and Illinois. Three of these died in the crib, with only one lasting past 1846.

The second regional gathering, held in December 1843, was held in Boston under the auspices of the Brook Farm transcendentalists. It was at this gathering that the Brook Farm principals announced their formal conversion to the ideas of Fourierism. Plans were made to coordinate the activities of Brook Farm with the Christian Hopedale Community and the Northampton Association of Education and Industry (Ross Farm) through quarterly meetings. Three such conclaves were held before the idea was abandoned in October 1844 due to the divergent interests of the three communal experiments. The Boston convention also led to the formation in January 1844 of a formal regional organization, the New England Fourier Society, in which Brisbane and William Henry Channing played a leading role.

Efforts in Western New York proved somewhat fruitful, with a March 1844 meeting in Rochester resulting in the formation of a group called the American Industrial Union (AIU), attended by representatives of seven phalanxes. The group opened an office in Rochester in May and attempted to aid its member Associations through cooperative purchasing of supplies and coordinating trade of the products of each. The AIU soon was forced to terminate due to the rapid collapse of its member phalanxes, however, although the idea behind the organization made a lasting impression on prominent Fourierist leaders.

These regional meetings were followed by a first attempt at a truly national conclave, with New York Fourierist leaders issuing a call for a "General Convention of the Friends of Association in the United States," held in New York City from April 4–6, 1844.

== See also ==
- List of Fourierist Associations in the United States
- The Phalanx/The Harbinger
- Albert Brisbane
