= Baxter Althane disaster =

The Baxter Althane disaster in autumn 2001 was a series of over 50 sudden deaths of kidney failure patients in Spain, Croatia, Italy, Germany, Taiwan, Colombia and the USA (mainly Nebraska and Texas). All had received hospital treatment with Althane hemodialysis equipment, a product range manufactured by Baxter International, USA.

Although official investigations initially found no link between the cases, Baxter Co. eventually published its own findings, admitting that a perfluorohydrocarbon-based cleaning fluid was not properly removed from the tubings during manufacture. Baxter also announced discontinuation and permanent recall of all Althane equipment. Families of most non-US victims were compensated by Baxter voluntarily, while US plaintiffs settled via a class action lawsuit. The company continues to manufacture dialysis machines of a newer design.
