= List of Fourierist Associations in the United States =

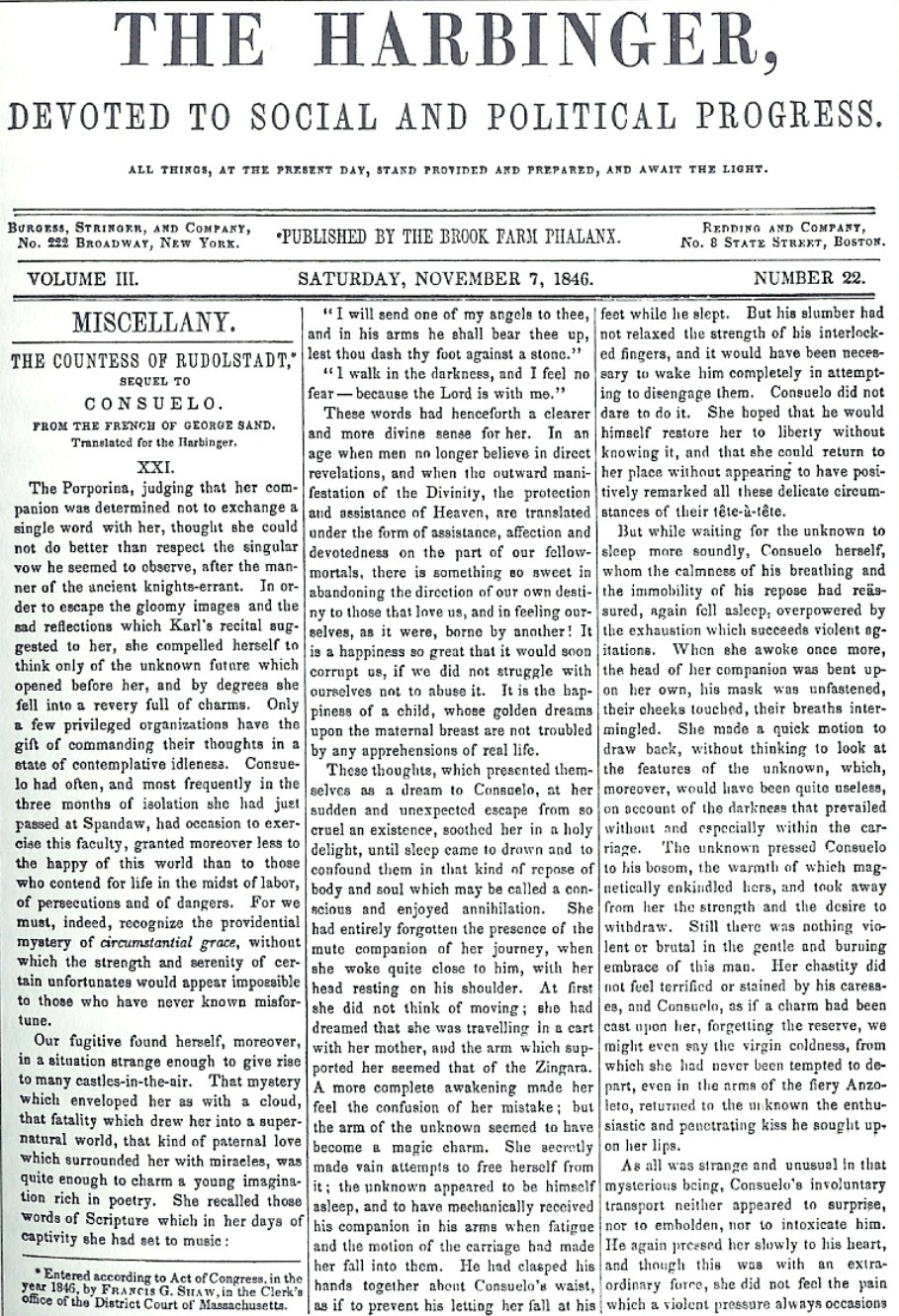
The Harbinger (formerly The Phalanx), was the primary organ of the Fourierist movement in the United States.

This is a list of Fourierist Associations in the United States which emerged during a short-lived popular boom during the first half of the 1840s. Between 1843 and 1845 more than 30 such "associations" – known to their adherents as "phalanxes" – were established in the United States, all of which met with economic failure and rapid disestablishment within one or a comparatively few years.

The Fourierist movement of the 1840s was one of the four primary branches of secular utopian socialism in the United States during the 19th century, succeeding Owenism (1825–27) while antedating Icarianism (1848–98) and Bellamyism (1889–96).

== Background ==
The communitarian ideas of Charles Fourier (1772–1837) were popularized in the United States in an 1840 book by the American Albert Brisbane as well as through a column by Brisbane in the pages of Horace Greeley's New York Tribune in 1842 and 1843.

The Fourierist movement followed an earlier attempt to remake society through exemplary socialist communities attempted on American soil by Robert Owen from 1825 until 1827. John Humphrey Noyes, a historian of these movements in addition to being a communal leader in his own right, noted the difference in the following way:

The main idea on which Owen and Fourier worked was the same. Both proposed to reconstruct society by gathering large numbers into unitary dwellings. Owen had as clear sense of the compound economies of Association as Fourier had, and discoursed as eloquently, if not as scientifically on the beauties and blessings of combined industry. ... The difference in their methods is this: Owen's plan was based on Communism [communalism]; Fourier's plan was based on the Joint-stock principle.

== List ==
Name	Location	Launched	Terminated	Comments
Alphadelphia Association	Kalamazoo County, MI	1844	1848	
Bloomfield Association	Ontario County, NY	1844	1846	
Brook Farm Institute of Agriculture and Education	West Roxbury, MA	1841	1847	Unitarian Transcendentalist until 1844, Fourierist thereafter.
Bureau County Phalanx	Bureau County, IL	1843	1843	
Clarkson Industrial Association	Monroe County, NY	1844	1844	Also known as the “Western New York Industrial Association.”
Clermont Phalanx	Utopia, OH	1844	1846	Established in aftermath of Sept. 1843 Pittsburgh "Western Fourier Convention."
Columbia Phalanx	Muskingum County, OH	1844	1845?	
Goose Pond Community	Pike County, PA	1844	1844	Formerly the Social Reform Unity
Hopedale Community	Hopedale, MA	1843	???	Mentioned in Frederic Heath (ed.), Social Democracy Red Book [1900], pg. 15.
Integral Phalanx	Middletown, OH	1845	1845	Established in aftermath of Sept. 1843 Pittsburgh "Western Fourier Convention." Residents later moved to Illinois and established the Sangamon Phalanx.
Iowa Pioneer Phalanx	Mahaska County, IA	1843	1845	Founded by members of the Jefferson County Industrial Association.
Jefferson County Industrial Association	Watertown, NY	1843	1844	
LaGrange Phalanx	LaGrange County, IN	1843	1847	described in Ch. 8 & 9 of The Salt and the Savor, Howard W. Troyer, 1950.
Le Raysville Phalanx	Bradford County, PA	1844	1844	
McKean County Association	McKean County, PA	1843	1844	Also known as “Teutonia.”
Marlboro Association	Stark County, OH	1841	1845	
Moorehouse Union	Hamilton County, NY	1843	1844	Straddled and crossed county line with Herkimer County.
North American Phalanx	Phalanx, NJ	1843	1856	Last surviving Fourierist Association from the 1840s boom.
Northampton Association	Florence, MA	1842	1846	
Ohio Phalanx	Bellaire, OH	1844	1845	Established in aftermath of Sept. 1843 Pittsburgh "Western Fourier Convention."
One-Mentian Community	Monroe County, PA	1843	1844	
Ontario Phalanx	Monroe County, NY	1844	???	
Prairie Home Community	Logan County, OH	1843	???	Also known as "Grand Prairie Community."
Raritan Bay Union	Perth Amboy, NJ	1853	1860	
La Réunion	Dallas, TX	1855	1857	
Sangamon Phalanx	Sangamon County, IL	1845	1848	Continuation of the Integral Phalanx
Silkville	Williamsburg, KS	1869	1892	Sericulture farm in Kansas that was founded on Fourierian principles. Later shifted away from Fourierism before its collapse.
Skaneateles Community	Skaneateles, New York	1843	1846	
Social Reform Unity	Pike County, PA	1842	1843	Later the Goose Pond Community
Sodus Bay Phalanx	Wayne County, NY	1844	1844	
Spring Farm Association	Sheboygan County, WI	1846	1848	
Sylvania Association	Greeley, Pennsylvania	1842	1845	Horace Greeley was Treasurer of this phalanx. Link to Sylvania Association webpage.
Trumbull Phalanx	Phalanx, OH	1844	1847	Established in aftermath of Sept. 1843 Pittsburgh "Western Fourier Convention."
Utilitarian Association	Waukesha County, WI	1844	1844	
Wisconsin Phalanx	Ceresco, WI (now Ripon)	1844	1850	One of the longest-lived phalanxes of the 1840s boom.
Zanesfield Phalanx	Logan County, OH	1843	???	Also known as "Upper Domain" or "Highland Home." Small offshoot of Prairie Home Community, visited by MacDonald in August 1843.

Source: William Alfred Hinds, American Communities. Second edition. Chicago, IL: Charles H. Kerr & Co., 1908; pg. 250. (unless otherwise noted)

== See also ==
- List of Owenite communities in the United States
- Familistère de Guise, a Phalanx in France.
- Falanstério do Saí, Brazilian Phalanx
- Scăieni Phalanstery
