= Harry Kramer =

Harry Kramer may refer to:

- Harry Kramer (announcer) (1911–1996), American radio and television announcer
- Harry Kramer (American artist) (born 1939), American painter
- Harry Kramer (German artist) (1925–1997), German sculptor, choreographer, dancer, and professor of art

== See also ==
- Harry Kraemer (born 1955), American business executive
