= John A. Collins (abolitionist) =

American abolitionist (1810–1879)

John Anderson Collins (1810–1890) was an American abolitionist.

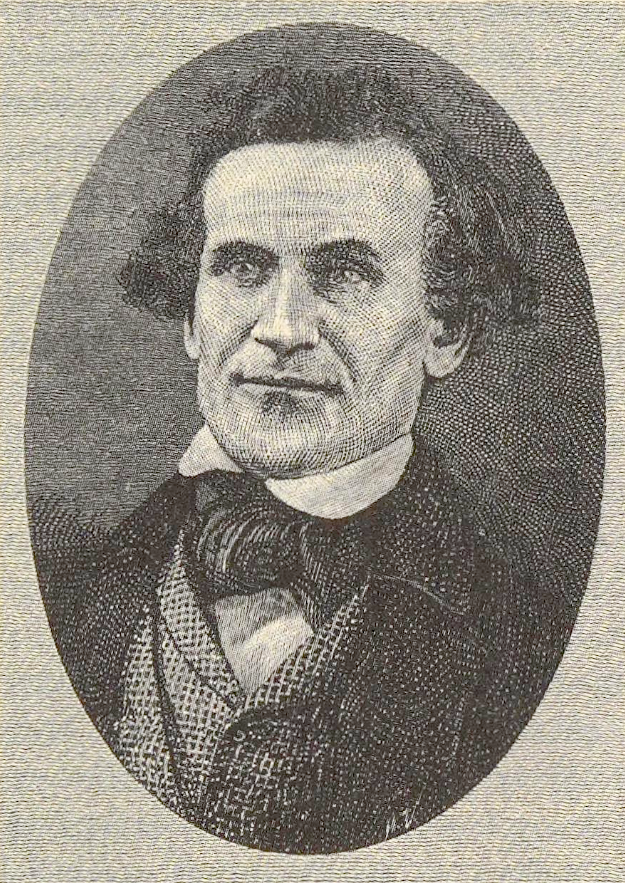
John A. Collins, from a daguerreotype

== Biography ==
Collins was born in Manchester, Vermont. He attended Middlebury College, joined the Andover Theological Seminary, and eventually left both to work in the anti-slavery movement. From 1840 to 1842, Collins served as the General Agent and Vice President of the Massachusetts Anti-Slavery Society (MASS, founded 1835), a Boston branch of the American Anti-Slavery Society.

He helped to mentor Frederick Douglass as Douglass began to become a speaker on the abolitionist circuit.

A Congregationalist at first (eventually turning to atheism) he worked with Quakers and Garrisonian abolitionists in the Society for Universal Inquiry and Reform, which hoped to reorganize society along Christian non-resistance lines.

Collins was the editor of the abolitionist periodicals The Monthly Offering and Monthly Garland.

He combined abolitionism with communitarianism, and anarchism, and eventually became more interested in Owenite socialism. He became a leader in the Skaneateles Community, an 1841–1846 Fourierist socialist experimental community, and edited The Communitist. Upon the failure of this community, he renounced socialist principles as "false in theory and pernicious in their practical tendencies."

He left for California in 1849 to follow the gold rush, and became a Whig candidate for the state legislature, also renouncing his earlier abolitionist opinions in the process. He worked as an attorney, and defended Asian immigrants against Chinese Exclusion Act-related persecution, as well as free thinkers. He would also serve in leadership roles with the National Cooperative Homestead Society and the Society of Progressive Spiritualists.
