= Charles E. Golden =

American businessman

Charles E. Golden is an American businessman.

== Biography ==
=== Early life ===
Charles Golden was born in Fort Wayne, Indiana. He received a Bachelor of Arts in Economics from Lafayette College in 1968 and an M.B.A. from Lehigh University in 1970.

=== Career ===
He started his career at General Motors in 1970, rising up in the treasury department. From 1993 to 1996, he served as Corporate Vice President of GM, and chairman and chief executive officer of Vauxhall Motors, a subsidiary of GM in the United Kingdom. From 1996 to 2006, he served as executive vice president and chief financial officer of Eli Lilly and Company, where he still serves as a director.

He sits on the board of directors of Unilever, Hillrom, Indiana University Health and the Eaton Corporation. He is a member of the National Advisory Board of JPMorgan Chase.

He sits on the boards of trustees of the Park Tudor School in Indianapolis and the Indiana Stadium Authority. He also serves on the finance committee of the Indianapolis Museum of Art. He served as president of the Crossroads of American Council, an organization of the Boy Scouts of America. He was awarded the Sagamore of the Wabash.

=== Personal life ===
He is married, and has two children.
