= Synovis Life Technologies =

Medical-device manufacturer

- Formerly: Bio-Vascular, Inc. (until 2002)
- Headquarters: Minneapolis, Minnesota, United States
- Parent: Baxter International (since 2012)
- Website: synovislife.com

Synovis Life Technologies is a Minneapolis-based manufacturer of various medical devices. The company appeared on the 2004 edition of Fortune 100 Fastest Growing Companies, a categorisation also indicative of sales exceeding $50 million. It has also appeared on the Forbes 200 Best Small Companies lists, and the Russell 2000 Index.

Until May 1, 2002 it was known as Bio-Vascular, Inc., it changed names to reflect a diversified field of products. According to its 2010 annual report, the firm went public in 1985, and now reports a net revenue of $68 million and net income of $4.9 million. The same report listed the company's President and Chief Executive Officer as Richard W. Kramp and the Chairman of the Board of Directors as John D. Seaberg.

In February 2012, Synovis was acquired by Baxter International.
