= The Monthly Offering =

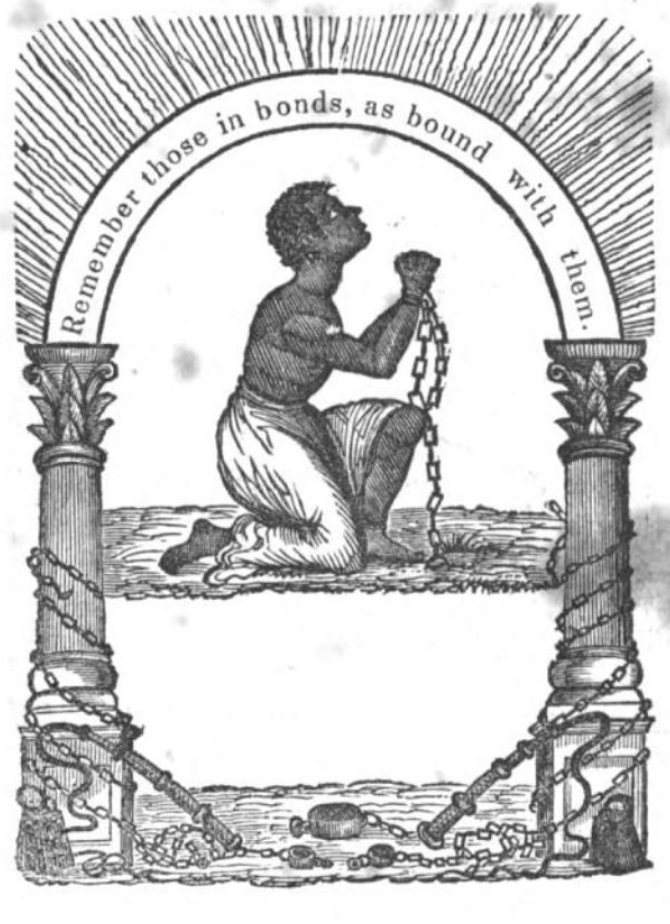
This is a photo found in the cover page of the book version of The Monthly Offering, available in the Small Special Collections Library.

The Monthly Offering was an anti-slavery periodical published between July 1840 and December 1841 from Boston, Massachusetts. Pages were approximately 11x15 inches. The original intent of the publication was to provide poems, music, and information on abolitionist and anti-slavery topics to readers. Another hallmark of the periodical was its commitment to remaining inexpensive; it "could be afforded so low that every one might procure it, who had a desire to become acquainted with the nature and influence of slavery, and the means employed for its removal." The Monthly Offering was one of many American anti-slavery publications including The Liberator, Freedom's Journal, and Facts For The People.

== Author and contributors ==
The Monthly Offering is credited to John A Collins (1810-1879), an abolitionist born in Manchester, Vermont. Collins attended Middlebury College, joined the Andover Theological Seminary, and eventually left both to work in the anti-slavery movement. From 1840-1842, Collins served as the General Agent and Vice President of the Massachusetts Anti-Slavery Society (MASS, founded 1835), a Boston branch of the American Anti-Slavery Society. Collins also edited a newspaper called Monthly Garland.

The Monthly Offering also featured writings from other authors, including Maria Weston Chapman.

== Present ==
The Monthly Offering now exists in book compilations. It has been republished for historical preservation purposes under the title "The Monthly Offering 1841."

There is a physical copy located in the Albert and Shirley Small Special Collections Library at the University of Virginia. It is also available on Google Books.
