= Charles Fourier =

French utopian socialist and philosopher (1772–1837)

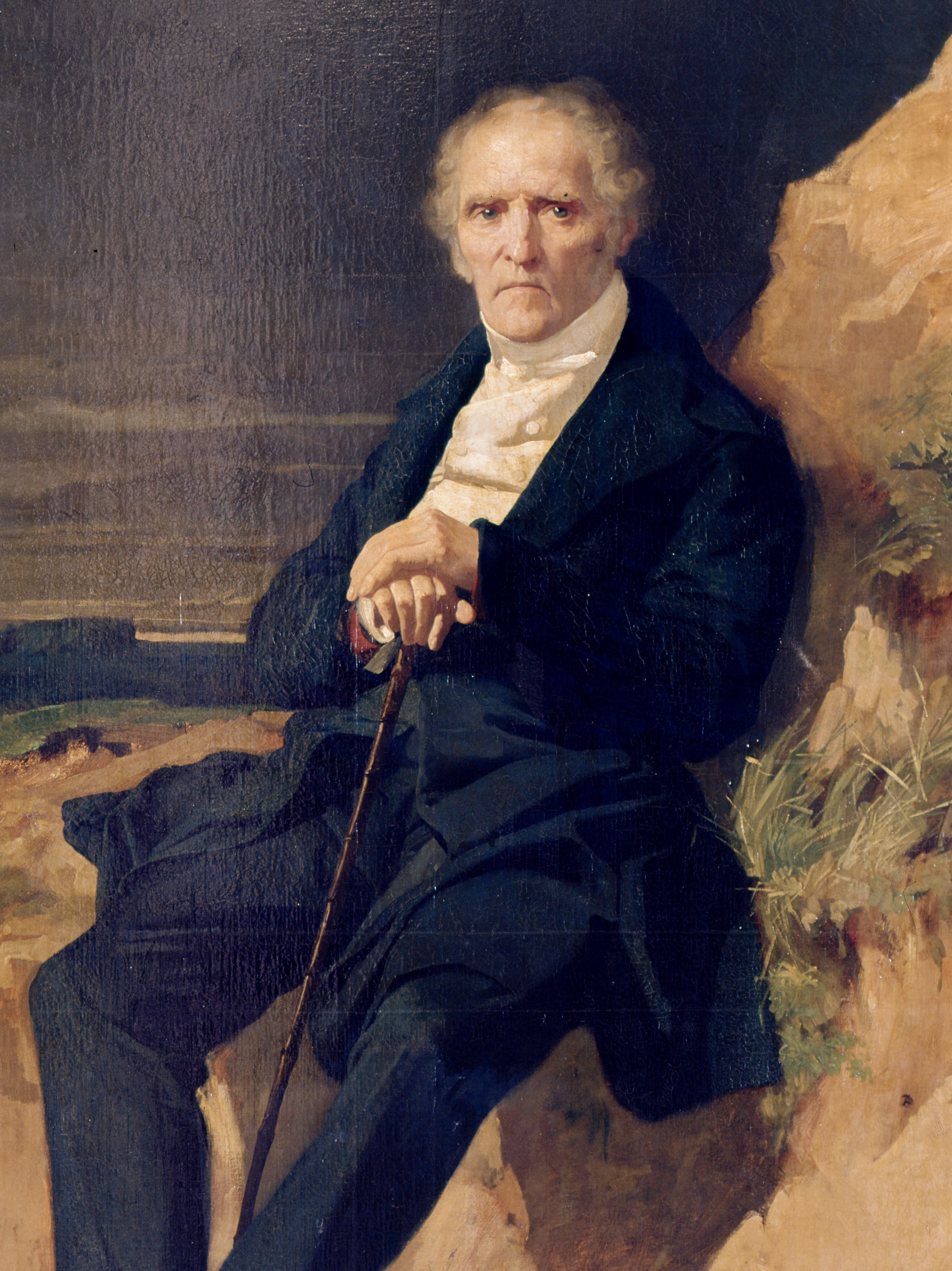
- Portrait by Jean Gigoux, 1835
- Born: François Marie Charles Fourier; 7 April 1772; Besançon, Kingdom of France
- Died: 10 October 1837 (aged 65); Paris, Kingdom of France

Philosophical work
- Era: 19th-century philosophy
- Region: Western philosophy
- School: Utopian socialism Fourierism
- Main interests: Political philosophy Economics; Philosophy of desire
- Notable ideas: Phalanstère "Attractive work" Coining the term feminism Critique of work

François Marie Charles Fourier (/ˈfʊrieɪ, -iər/; French: [ʃaʁl fuʁje]; 7 April 1772 – 10 October 1837) was a French philosopher regarded as having founded the concept of utopian socialism. His views, held to be radical in his lifetime, have appeared more frequently in the contemporary world—the use of the word feminisme in Fourier's 1837 edition of his Théorie des quatre mouvements et des destinées générales (Theory of the Four Movements and the General Destinies) has been regarded as formative on the development of feminism.

Fourier's social views and proposals inspired a movement of intentional communities. Among them in the United States were the community of Utopia, Ohio; La Reunion near present-day Dallas, Texas; Lake Zurich, Illinois; the North American Phalanx in Red Bank, New Jersey; Brook Farm in West Roxbury, Massachusetts; the Community Place and Sodus Bay Phalanx in New York State; Silkville, Kansas, and several others. In Guise, France, he influenced the Familistery of Guise. Fourier later inspired a diverse array of revolutionary thinkers and writers.

== Life ==
François Marie Charles Fourier was born in Besançon, France, on 7 April 1772. The son of a small businessman, Fourier was more interested in architecture than in his father's trade. Teaching himself, he became a master of musical theory; his greatest interest as a boy was geography, in pursuit of which he sought entry to the École du génie militaire de Mézières even though it enrolled only sons of noblemen. Fourier later said he was grateful that he did not pursue engineering because it would have taken too much time away from his efforts to help humanity.

When his father died in 1781, Fourier received two-fifths of his father's estate, valued at more than 200,000 francs. This enabled Fourier to travel throughout Europe at his leisure. In 1791 he moved from Besançon to Lyon, where he was employed by the merchant M. Bousquet. Fourier's travels also brought him to Paris, where he worked as the head of the Office of Statistics for a few months. From 1791 to 1816 Fourier was employed in Paris, Rouen, Lyon, Marseille, and Bordeaux. As a traveling salesman and correspondence clerk, his research and thought was time-limited: he complained of "serving the knavery of merchants" and the stupefaction of "deceitful and degrading duties".

He began writing. His first book was published in 1808 but sold few copies. After six years, it fell into the hands of Monsieur Just Muiron, who eventually became Fourier's patron. Fourier produced most of his writings between 1816 and 1821. In 1822, he tried to sell his books again but with no success.

Fourier died in Paris in 1837.

== Ideas ==
Fourier declared that concern and cooperation are the keys to social success. He believed that a society that cooperated would see an immense improvement in its productivity. Workers would be recompensed for their labour according to their contribution. Fourier saw such cooperation occurring in communities he called "phalanxes", based upon structures called Phalanstères or "grand hotels". These buildings were four-level apartment complexes where the richest had the uppermost apartments and the poorest had ground-floor residences. Wealth was determined by one's job; jobs were assigned based on interest and desire. There were incentives: jobs people might not enjoy doing would receive higher pay.

Fourier emphasised harmony and passion when it came to these communities. He wanted phalansteries to be places where people could not only do the work they liked, but discover and follow their passions. Fourier saw human nature as God-given and something that needed to be discovered. He believed people are born with certain dispositions and that society did not allow them to follow these dispositions. Instead it restrained and misdirected human nature. He believed a social arrangement was needed that allowed for the development of individual human nature. The development of individual nature would reveal passions. Despite Fourier's considerable work into his phalansteries, they remained only concepts, as he needed money to set them up, but never acquired it.

Fourier considered trade, which he associated with Jews, the "source of all evil", and advocated that Jews be forced to do farm work in the phalansteries. By the end of his life, he advocated the immigration of Jews to Palestine with the assistance of the Rothschilds. John K. Roth and Richard L. Rubenstein see Fourier as motivated by economic and religious antisemitism rather than the racial antisemitism that emerged later in the century.

=== The passions and labour ===
Fourier insists that this transformation requires a complete change in the social institutions: distribution of the social product according to need, assignment of functions according to individual faculties and inclinations, constant mutation of functions, short work periods, and so on. But the possibility of "attractive labor" (travail attrayant) derives above all from the release of libidinal forces. Fourier assumes the existence of an attraction industrielle which makes for pleasurable co-operation. It is based on the attraction passionnée in the nature of man, which persists despite the opposition of reason, duty, prejudice. This attraction passionnée tends toward three principal objectives: the creation of "luxury, or the pleasure of the five senses"; the formation of libidinal groups (of friendship and love); and the establishment of a harmonious order, organizing these groups for work in accordance with the development of the individual "passions" (internal and external "play" of faculties).

Fourier held that there are 12 common passions, and 810 types of character as a result of their convergences in individuals, so the ideal phalanx would have 1,620 people. He speculated that there would come to be six million phalanxes in the course of the development of this world-system, all under the guidance of either a rationally ruling world omniarch, or a "World Congress of Phalanxes" led by people of similar leadership. Bachelors and bachelorettes were esteemed by Fourier, who conceived of a Greco-Roman myth-influenced corps of "fairies", peaceful libertines who would engage in open, polyamorous relationships with them to ease stress and low self-esteem over sexual inactivity and their relationship statuses. An alternative was given, where people could consult a card-index of personality types calculated from the 810 types for suitable partners.

In Eros and Civilization, Herbert Marcuse wrote, "The idea of libidinal work relations in a developed industrial society finds little support in the tradition of thought, and where such support is forthcoming it seems of a dangerous nature. The transformation of labor into pleasure is the central idea in Fourier's giant socialist utopia."

=== Women's rights and critique of marriage ===
Fourier advocated for women's rights, believing that all important jobs should be open to women on the basis of skill and aptitude rather than closed on account of gender roles. He spoke of women as individuals, not as half the human couple. Fourier saw the risk of "traditional" marriage increasingly historically tarnishing women's rights as human beings, and thus never married. Writing before the advent of the term "homosexuality", he held that both men and women have a wide range of sexual needs and preferences, which may change throughout their lives, including same-sex attraction and androgénité; he wrote in defense of homosexuality, arguing that all sexual expressions should be enjoyed exempt of abuse, and that "affirming one's difference" social integration. Fourier's concern was to liberate every human being, in two senses: through education and by liberating human passion.

=== Critique of civilisation ===
Fourier characterized poverty, and not inequality, as the principal cause of disorder in society, and proposed to eradicate it by means of sufficiently high wages and a "decent minimum" for those unable to work. He referred to "civilisation" in a pejorative sense for what he saw as its deliberate cultivation of poverty; in the words of Johnathan Beecher, "Fourier's contempt for the respectable thinkers and ideologies of his age was so intense that he always used the terms philosopher and civilisation in a pejorative sense. In his lexicon civilisation was a depraved order, a synonym for perfidy and constraint [...] Fourier's attack on civilisation had qualities not to be found in the writing of any other social critic of his time."

=== Child analysis and education ===
Fourier felt that "civilised" parents and teachers saw children as little idlers. But he himself believed that children as early as age two and three were very industrious. He listed children's dominant tastes as including:

1. Rummaging or inclination to handle everything, examine everything, look through everything, to constantly change occupations;
2. Industrial commotion, taste for noisy occupations;
3. Aping or imitative mania.
4. Industrial miniature, a taste for miniature workshops.
5. Progressive attraction of the weak toward the strong.

=== Utopian aspirations ===
scholars and critics have seen Fourier's work as outlining a new world order based on unity of action and harmonious collaboration, with the World Congress of Phalanxes described as an early proposal for a total, socially formative world government. He used eccentric figures of speech to refer to this, including that the seas would lose their salinity and "turn to lemonade", and that the North Pole would be milder than the Mediterranean in a future phase of Perfect Harmony, resembling later views of climate change.

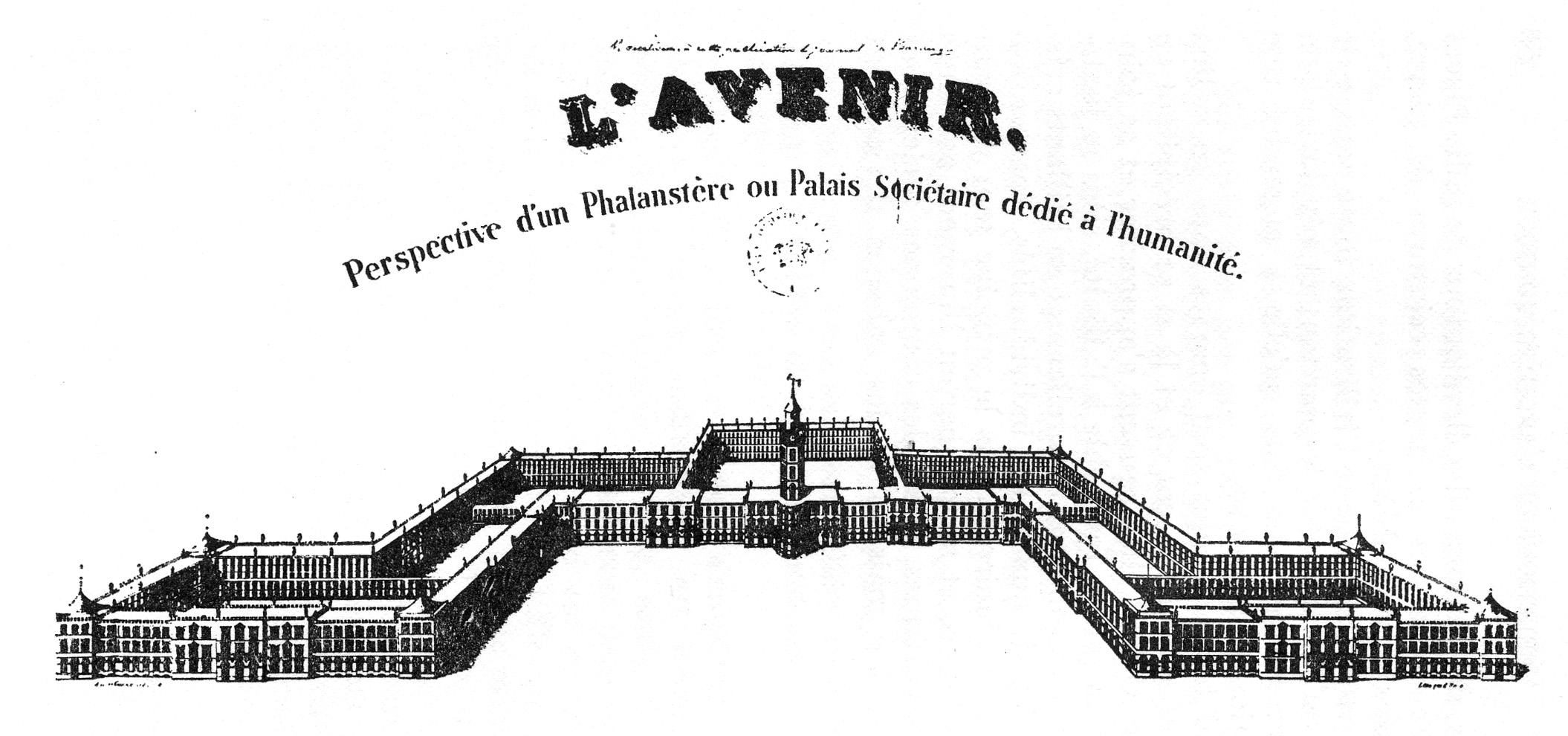
Perspective view of Fourier's Phalanstère

=== Antisemitism ===
In contrast to the tolerance displayed in his other views, Fourier wrote that Jews were "the leprosy and the ruin of the body politic". Professing belief in an early form of the international Jewish conspiracy theory extending from medieval antisemitism, he criticized governments as "prostrate" before a "secret and indissoluble league" of Jews. He placed great significance on the religious restrictions prohibiting Jews from eating at the same table as gentiles:

he confined himself to sitting down at table and drinking; he refused to eat any of the dishes, because they were prepared by Christians. Christians have to be very patient to tolerate such impertinence. In the Jewish religion it denotes a system of defiance and aversion for other sects. Now, does a sect which wishes to carry its hatred as far as the table of its protectors, deserve to be protected?

== Influence ==
The influence of Fourier's ideas in French politics carried forward into the 1848 Revolution and the Paris Commune by followers such as Victor Considerant.

- Numerous references to Fourierism appear in Dostoevsky's political novel Demons, published in 1872.
- Fourier's ideas also took root in America, with his followers starting phalanxes throughout the country, including one of the most famous, Utopia, Ohio.
- Fourier is one of three major utopian socialists and pre-Marxists whose ideas are critiqued in Friedrich Engels's Socialism: Utopian and Scientific.
- Peter Kropotkin, in the preface to his book The Conquest of Bread, considered Fourier the founder of the libertarian branch of socialist thought, as opposed to the authoritarian socialist ideas of Babeuf and Buonarroti.
- In the mid-20th century, Fourier's influence began to rise again among writers reappraising socialist ideas outside the Marxist mainstream. After the Surrealists broke with the French Communist Party, André Breton returned to Fourier, writing Ode à Charles Fourier in 1947.
- Walter Benjamin considered Fourier crucial enough to devote an entire "konvolut" of his massive, projected book on the Paris arcades, the Passagenwerk, to Fourier's thought and influence. He writes: "To have instituted play as the canon of a labor no longer rooted in exploitation is one of the great merits of Fourier", and notes that "Only in the summery middle of the nineteenth century, only under its sun, can one conceive of Fourier's fantasy materialized."
- In Eros and Civilization, Marcuse wrote, "Fourier comes closer than any other utopian socialist to elucidating the dependence of freedom on non-repressive sublimation."
- In 1969, Raoul Vaneigem quoted and adapted Fourier's Avis aux civilisés relativement à la prochaine métamorphose sociale in his text Avis aux civilisés relativement à l'autogestion généralisée.

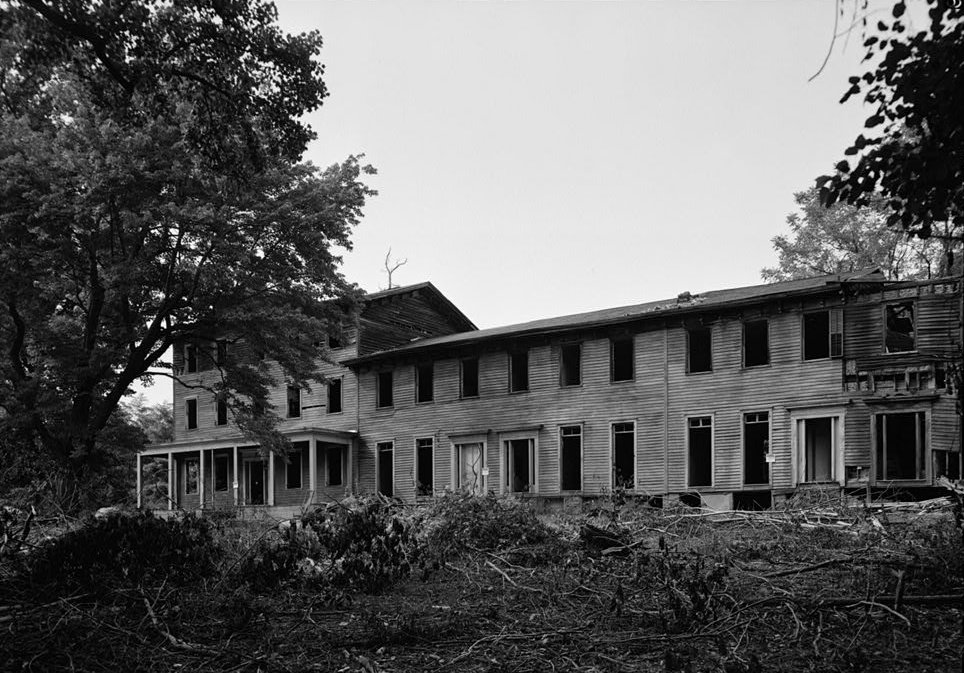
North American Phalanx building in New Jersey

- Fourier's work significantly influenced the writings of Gustav Wyneken, Guy Davenport (in his work of fiction Apples and Pears), Peter Lamborn Wilson, and Paul Goodman.
- In Whit Stillman's film Metropolitan, the idealistic Tom Townsend describes himself as a Fourierist, and debates the success of social experiment Brook Farm with another character. Bidding him goodnight, Sally Fowler says, "Good luck with your furrierism." [sic]
- David Harvey, in the appendix to his book Spaces of Hope, offers a personal utopian vision of the future in cities citing Fourier's ideas.
- Libertarian socialist and environmentalist thinker Murray Bookchin wrote that "The Greek ideal of the rounded citizen in a rounded environment—one that reappeared in Charles Fourier's utopian works—was long cherished by the anarchists and socialists of the last century...The opportunity of the individual to devote his or her productive activity to many different tasks over an attenuated work week (or in Fourier's ideal society, over a given day) was seen as a vital factor in overcoming the division between manual and intellectual activity, in transcending status differences that this major division of work created, and in enhancing the wealth of experiences that came with a free movement from industry through crafts to food cultivation."
- Nathaniel Hawthorne in Chapter 7 of his novel The Blithedale Romance gently mocks Fourier, writing:
  "When, as a consequence of human improvement", said I, "the globe shall arrive at its final perfection, the great ocean is to be converted into a particular kind of lemonade, such as was fashionable at Paris in Fourier's time. He calls it limonade a cedre. It is positively a fact! Just imagine the city docks filled, every day, with a flood tide of this delectable beverage!
- Writers of the post-left anarchy tendency have praised Fourier's work. Bob Black in his work The Abolition of Work advocates Fourier's idea of attractive work as a solution to his criticisms of work conditions in contemporary society.

== Fourier's works ==
- Fourier, Charles. Théorie des quatre mouvements et des destinées générales (Theory of the four movements and the general destinies), appeared anonymously in Lyon in 1808.
- Fourier, Charles. Le Nouveau Monde amoureux. Written 1816–18, not published widely until 1967.
- Fourier, Ch. Œuvres complètes de Ch. Fourier. 6 tomes. Paris: Librairie Sociétaire, 1841-1848.
- Fourier, Charles. La fausse industrie morcelée, répugnante, mensongère, et l'antidote, l'industrie naturelle, combinée, attrayante, véridique, donnant quadruple produit (False Industry, Fragmented, Repugnant, Lying and the Antidote, Natural Industry, Combined, Attractive, True, giving four times the product), Paris: Bossange. 1835.
- Fourier, Charles. Oeuvres complètes de Charles Fourier. 12 vols. Paris: Anthropos, 1966–1968.
- Jones, Gareth Stedman, and Ian Patterson, eds. Fourier: The Theory of the Four Movements. Cambridge Texts in the History of Political Thought. Cambridge: Cambridge UP, 1996.
- Fourier, Charles. Design for Utopia: Selected Writings. Studies in the Libertarian and Utopian Tradition. New York: Schocken, 1971. ISBN 0-8052-0303-6
- Poster, Mark, ed. Harmonian Man: Selected Writings of Charles Fourier. Garden City: Doubleday. 1971.
- Beecher, Jonathan and Richard Bienvenu, eds. The Utopian Vision of Charles Fourier: Selected Texts on Work, Love, and Passionate Attraction. Boston: Beacon Press, 1971.
- Wilson, Peter Lamborn, Escape from the Nineteenth Century and Other Essays. Brooklyn: Autonomedia, 1998.
- Fourier, Charles. The World War of Small Pastries. Brooklyn: Autonomedia, 2015. Translated by Shawn P. Wilbur & Joan Roelofs. Preface by Peter Lamborn Wilson. (Excerpt from Le Nouveau monde amoureux)

== See also ==
- Alphadelphia Association
- American Union of Associationists
- Brook Farm
- Decent work
- List of Fourierist Associations in the United States
- Society of the Friends of Truth

People

- Jean-Baptiste André Godin
- Alphonse Toussenel, a disciple of Fourier
