= Skaneateles Community =

Coordinates: 42°58′58.17″N 76°27′17.47″W

Skaneateles Community was a utopian social experiment established in 1843 by the Society for Universal Inquiry and Reform in a 350-acre (1.4 km^{2}) farm near Mottville, in Skaneateles in Upstate New York based on Fourierist principles. It was one of several communities established by the Society prior to the Civil War.

The community survived for three years. John A. Collins (1810–1890), a noted abolitionist, became the community leader. During its life, the community had about a hundred members who shared living quarters as well as work on the farm, and in the sawmill and print shop. Although economically viable, internal differences and Collins' waning leadership resulted in the dissolution of the community. By 1846, Collins had reverted to theism and the Whig party, and had become the editor of a daily Whig journal published in Dayton, Ohio. He wrote an autobiographical essay that included a short description of his motives in establishing the community, attributing its failure to human nature:

"... We established a community upon the no-government, or non-resistance principle; upon the largest liberty; upon the broadest principles of democratic equality. With a faithful and honest trial of nearly three years, we were compelled to renounce the principles we entertained, both in relation to governments and religion and society, as false in theory and pernicious in their practical tendencies.

"They might, so far as governments are concerned, do very well if men were angels, and angels gods; but human nature is too low, too selfish, and too ignorant for relations so exalted. ...":

== Current ==
The location was later renamed Community Place. Currently the community house is used as a wedding venue, the Carriage Barn at Frog Pond.

== Sources ==
- Hamm, Thomas D. "Skaneateles Community." Encyclopedia of New York State, 2005.
- Fogarty, Robert. "Utopian and Intentional Communities," The Encyclopedia of New York State. Syracuse University Press, 2005.
- Syracuse-Onondaga County Planning Agency. Onondaga Landmarks. 1975.
- Harley McKee, Patricia Earle, Paul Malo. Architecture Worth Saving in Onondaga County. Syracuse University Press. 1964.
