= Community Place =

- U.S. National Register of Historic Places
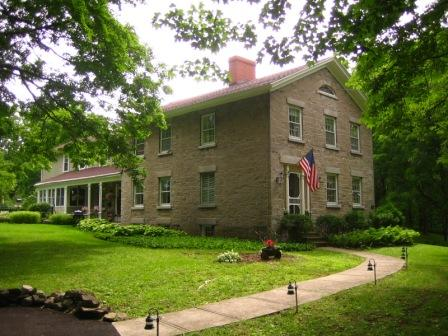
- Community Place

- Location within New York Location within the United States
- Location: S. of Skaneateles Falls at 680 Sheldon Rd.
- Nearest city: Skaneateles, New York
- Coordinates: 42°58′58.17″N 76°27′17.47″W
- Built: 1830
- Architect: Elijah Cole
- Architectural style: Greek Revival, Federal
- NRHP reference No.: 79001611
- Added to NRHP: April 20, 1979

Community Place, in Skaneateles, New York, United States, was built in 1830. It was photographed by the Historic American Buildings Survey in 1963 and was listed on the National Register of Historic Places in 1979.

It was a relatively successful Fourierist commune for three years, Skaneateles Community.

It is now known as Frog Pond.

It is located south of Skaneateles Falls, New York, at 680 Sheldon Road.

== Gallery ==
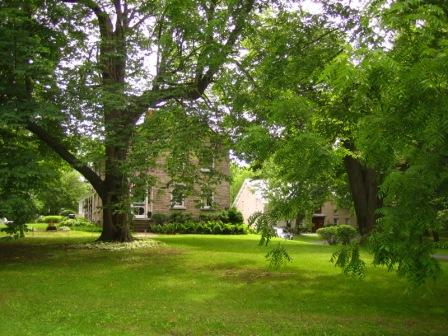
Photo with large carriage house and stables, visible to right and behind.

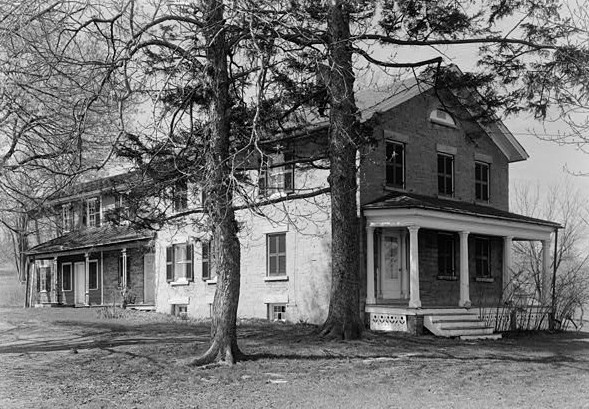
House in 1963.
