= Albert Brisbane =

American utopian socialist (1809–1890)

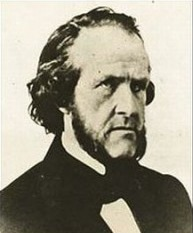
- Born: August 22, 1809; Batavia, New York, US
- Died: May 1, 1890 (aged 80); Richmond, Virginia, US
- Resting place: Batavia Cemetery
- Education: Faculté des lettres de Paris; Humboldt University of Berlin
- Spouses: Sarah White (m. 1853; died 1866) Redelia Bates (m. 1877)
- Children: 8, including Arthur Brisbane
- Relatives: Margaret Hunt Brisbane (granddaughter-in-law)

Albert Brisbane (August 22, 1809 – May 1, 1890) was an American utopian socialist and is remembered as the chief popularizer of the theories of Charles Fourier in the United States. Brisbane was the author of several books, notably Social Destiny of Man (1840), as well as the Fourierist periodical The Phalanx. He also founded the Fourierist Society in New York in 1839 and backed several other phalanx communes in the 1840s and 1850s. His son, Arthur Brisbane, became one of the best known American newspaper editors of the 20th century.

== Early life and family ==
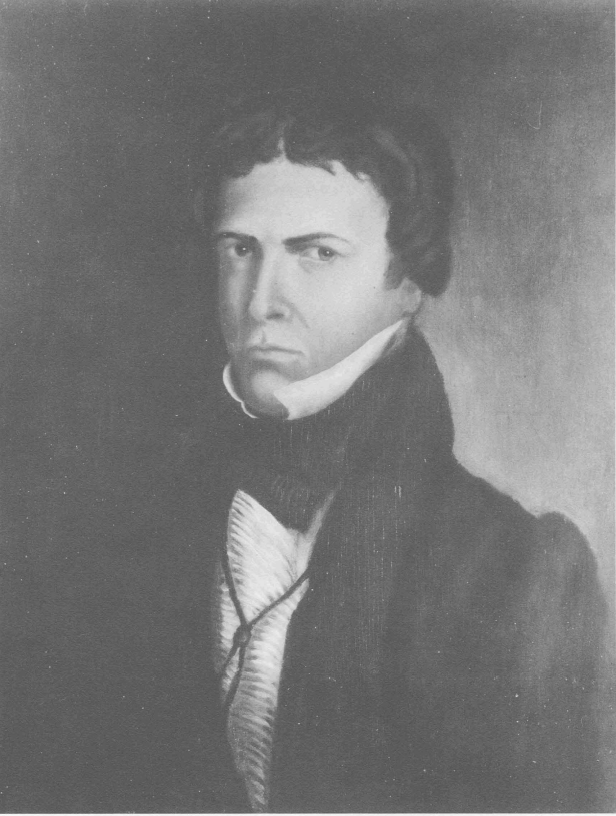
Albert Brisbane self-portrait, age eighteen

Albert Brisbane was born on August 22, 1809, in Batavia, New York He was the son of Mary Stevens (died 1889) and James Brisbane (1776–1851), a wealthy landowner. In 1798, James Brisbane, along with Joseph Ellicott (1760–1826) and three others, had traveled to Western New York to survey the 4,000,000 acres (1,600,000 ha) that had been purchased by the Holland Land Company from Robert Morris (1734–1806), one of the first Senators from Pennsylvania. They opened an office in Batavia to sell the land in parcels and establish settlements, which included the city that became Buffalo, New York.

Brisbane's mother, Mary, was of English descent and his father James, a Scot, had abandoned the Scottish Presbyterian Church in protest over its regimented rituals.

=== Education ===
Brisbane developed an affection for knowledge at an early age and as an inquisitive youth he learned various mechanical skills in the small carpentry, blacksmith, and saddle shops of Batavia. Unsatisfied with the quality of education in Batavia and with visions of an illustrious future for his son, Brisbane's father sent him to a boarding school in Long Island, New York at the age of fifteen. He briefly stayed at the school before moving to New York City and studying with tutors, including Jean Manesca. His New York schooling would ultimately be followed by six years of education abroad, with Brisbane studying philosophy in Paris and Berlin. He made the acquaintance of a number of prominent European intellectuals and political figures during the course of his studies.

== Interest in socialism ==
In Berlin, Brisbane became interested in the ideas of socialism, becoming an advocate of the ideas of Henri de Saint-Simon. Brisbane was very active with the promotion of Saint-Simon's ideas for a time, but became disaffected when the movement split between the followers of Barthélemy Enfantin and Amand Bazard and dropped out of the Saint-Simondian movement altogether. Brisbane would later dismiss Saint-Simon's doctrines as "artificial and in some respects false."

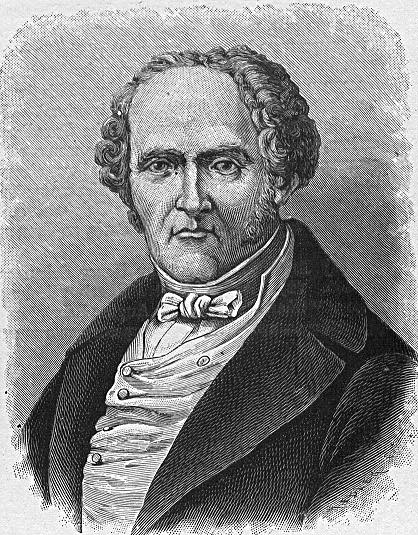
Brisbane was a disciple of the French Utopian socialist Charles Fourier (1772–1837).

=== Conversion to Fourierism ===
Searching for new ideas, Brisbane read a newly published short work by the philosopher Charles Fourier (1772–1837) entitled Treatise on Domestic and Agricultural Association and was immediately converted to the writer's ideas. Fourier, a French philosopher and writer, spent the greater part of his life attempting to uncover universal laws which he believed governed society so that productive enterprise could be reorganized on a rational basis, production expanded, and human needs more readily fulfilled. Fourier believed in a fundamental harmony of the universe and a preordained series of periods through which societies needed to necessarily travel from their primitive to their advanced state, and he considered himself a scientific discoverer akin to Isaac Newton.

In 1832 Brisbane left for Paris, where he stayed two years studying Fourier's system, including obtaining direct tutelage from the 60-year-old theorist himself He made the acquaintance of other devotees of Fourier's ideas during this initial phase of the Fourierist movement. He returned to the United States a committed believer and proselytizer of Fourier's idea of association and began work on a book to expound Fourierist ideas. Brisbane's first and most famous book, Social Destiny of Man, was published in 1840.

=== Brisbane's ideas ===
Brisbane accepted Fourier's ideas as a matter of faith, believing that the "social destiny of man" was an immutable force of nature; once the laws of this development were identified and publicized, he believed, the regeneration and transformation of the world would be rapid and effective. On the heels of his first successful book, in 1843 Brisbane published another adaptation of Fourier to American conditions, a book entitled Association: Or, A Concise Exposition of the Practical Part of Fourier's Social Science.

Brisbane argued that the remedy to society's ills lay in the adoption of more efficient forms of production, based upon the principle of harmony of the owners of capital and those employed by them. He did not envision the elimination of the role of the capitalist, but rather the regulation of distribution of the product of labor between capitalist and worker on a more equitable basis. Paramount to increasing production, Brisbane believed, was a reorganization of society into various subdivisions called "groups", "series", and "sacred legions", based upon the natural affinities of their participants. This reorganization would boost production by building enthusiasm for labor, gathering individuals of like proclivities for common tasks.

Following Fourier, Brisbane also sought the revolutionization of the family unit, proclaiming the individual home to be possessed of "monotony", "anti-social spirit", and the "absence of emulation", through which, he felt, it "debilitates the energies of the soul, and produces apathy and intellectual death." In opposition to this "selfishness", Brisbane opposed the communal ideal of association, living in collective dwellings and sharing the common table.

Brisbane cast the adoption of Fourier's system in millennial terms, asserting that

"Association will establish Christianity practically upon Earth. It will make the love of God and the love of the neighbor the greatest desire, and the practice of all men. Temptation to wrong will be taken from the paths of men, and a thousand perverting and degrading circumstances and influences will be purged from the social world."

=== Brisbane at zenith ===
Albert Brisbane in 1840

Brisbane's 1840 book was well-received and it enjoyed immediate success, gaining a broad readership among those concerned with the problems of society and helping to launch the Fourierist movement in the United States. Among those who read Brisbane's book and was thereby converted to the ideas of socialism was a young New York newspaper publisher, Horace Greeley, later elected to the US House of Representatives. Greeley provided valuable service to the Fourierist movement by advancing its ideas in the pages of his newspaper, The New Yorker, throughout 1840 and 1841. He offered Brisbane a column in his successor publication, the New York Tribune, from the time of its establishment in March 1842.

A groundswell of enthusiasm resulted from coverage of the ideas of Association in the New York Tribune. From 1843 to 1845 more than 30 Fourierian "Phalanxes" were established in northern and midwestern states. In 1844, Brook Farm, already an established Transcendentalist agrarian community in Massachusetts, formally declared itself a Fourierist community based on Brisbane's teachings.

A national movement of "Associationists' began to take form in 1843 and 1844, with a founding convention of the General Association for the Friends of Association in the United States held in New York City from April 4–6, 1844, attended by delegates from as far away as Maine and Virginia. The convention made a point of renouncing the fanciful, conjectural aspects of Fourier's writings, instead endorsing the concrete plan of association derived from his writings, in addition to its underlying philosophical framework. Work was done to create a formal "Union of Associations" to help coordinate the efforts of the myriad of small phalanxes coming into existence, and a meeting of such a group was planned for the following October.

At this critical juncture in the emergence of a practical movement, with 10 phalanxes already in existence and others at the planning stage, Albert Brisbane, the uncontested leader of Fourierism in America, made the fateful decision to depart for France to study Fourier's manuscripts there and to speak with French Associationists about their experiences. The 8-month trip effectively removed the commanding general of the Fourierist army from the campaign at its most critical juncture and is characterized by Carl J. Guarneri, a leading historian of the movement, as a reflection of Brisbane's "lifelong inability to cope with power and responsibility." With no energetic leader to replace Brisbane, the movement's momentum quickly dissipated.

=== Second European period ===
In 1877, after his wedding to Redelia Bates, he and Redelia, with children living with him, relocated to Europe with a view towards the education of the children. The family traveled the continent for two years before taking up resident in Paris. His health in decline and suffering from epilepsy, Brisbane pursued personal intellectual pursuits and tried his hand as an inventor, concentrating in particular on an effort to create an oven which cooked in a vacuum, thereby allowing the baking of bread and pastry without the use of yeast.

In 1889, the family returned to New York state, ostensibly so that Brisbane could build a prototype of the vacuum oven which he had been attempting to perfect.

== Personal life ==
In 1833, Albert returned from Europe with Adele LeBrun, who was alleged to be a countess. LeBrun was Catholic, which reportedly bothered his parents, and five years later, she moved back to Italy with their two young children, who historians conclude were probably Albert's; however, no record of marriage between the two has been located. One of these children was Charles Fourier Brisbane (1834–1867) whom Albert brought back to the US from Europe in 1851.

In 1847, Albert began a relationship with Lodoiska Durand (née Manesca), the daughter of Jean Manesca who had divorced her previous husband in 1844, who was later ruled a common-law wife with whom he had three children: a boy who died as an infant (1848–1849), Flora Manesca Brisbane (1857–1884) and Rosalia Brisbane, b. 1851. Later in life, Lodoiska, who never ceased to regard herself as Albert Brisbane's widow, referred to her five deceased children, in which she might have included Nina Durand b. 1837. After the death of Albert's son Charles, his children Howard Pascal Brisbane (1859–1922) and Adele Brisbane (b. 1861) lived with their grandfather Albert Brisbane and Lodoiska.

In 1853, Albert married Sarah White and they had five children:

- Alice Brisbane (1859–1953), who married Charles R. Thursby, a writer, and was painted by John Singer Sargent in 1898
- Hugo Brisbane (1862–1871)
- Albert Brisbane
- Arthur Brisbane (1863–1936), who married Phoebe Cary (1890–1967), a daughter of polo-player Seward Cary.
- Fowell Brisbane (1866–1911)

In 1866 Sarah died. Eleven years later, Brisbane married the 30 years younger Redelia Bates (1842–1943), who had been involved with the National Woman Suffrage Association.

=== Accusations of bigamy ===
The United States Census of 1850 indicates that Albert was living in Bergen County, New Jersey with Lodoiska. The Census of 1860 reports Albert living in Westchester County, New York with Sarah. In the Census of 1870, Albert was recorded as living in Union County, New Jersey, again with Lodoiska. Historians conclude that because of overlapping births of children in the two relationships and the corresponding census records, Albert was simultaneously maintaining two separate households, one with each woman.

After his 1877 marriage to Bates, Albert's brother, George, was so outraged that he wrote an angry letter that later became public, accusing the couple of bigamy because Lodoiska was still alive and had never obtained a divorce dissolving her common-law marriage to Albert. In return, Redelia filed a libel suit against George, requesting $50,000 in damages. At the same time, Lodoiska filed her own lawsuit requesting a divorce and alimony payments from Albert. This suit was successful, and she received $25 a week.

=== Death ===
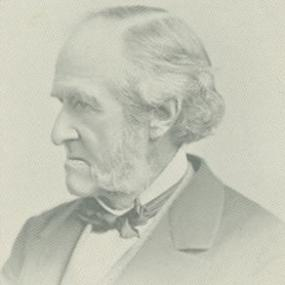
Brisbane towards the end of his life

After his return to the United States in 1889, Brisbane soon became ill and was forced to seek a change of climate to improve his health, traveling to North Carolina, before heading south to Florida, that winter. Together with Bates, Brisbane again moved north to Richmond, Virginia early in the spring of the following year. Good health did not return, however, and late in April Brisbane became bedridden and began to await his inevitable death.

Albert Brisbane died in Richmond early in the morning on May 1, 1890. His body was transported home to Western New York and where he was buried in the Batavia Cemetery in Batavia, alongside his parents and previous wife Sarah.

=== Descendants ===
Brisbane's son, Arthur Brisbane, became one of the best-known American newspaper editors of the 20th century. The papers of father and son are held together as Brisbane Family Papers collection by the Special Collections Research Center of Syracuse University in Syracuse, New York. The Albert Brisbane material, housed in one archival box, includes biographical material, correspondence, microfilm of his diaries from the 1830s, and a 56-page autobiography dated London, 1881.

Albert's great-grandson, Arthur S. Brisbane, was appointed Public Editor of The New York Times in June 2010.

== See also ==
- Fourierism
- List of Fourierist Associations in the United States
- American Union of Associationists
- Victor Prosper Considerant

== Works ==
- Social Destiny of Man, Or, Association and Reorganization of Industry. Philadelphia, PA: C.F. Stollmeyer, 1840.
- Association: Or, A Concise Exposition of the Practical Part of Fourier's Social Science. New York, NY: Greeley & McElrath (and others), 1843.
- A Concise Exposition of the Doctrine of Association: Or, Plan for a Re-organization of Society. New York, NY: J.S. Redfield, 1844.
- Theory of the Functions of the Human Passions Followed by an Outline View of the Fundamental Principles of Fourier's Theory of Social Science. New York, NY: Miller, Orton, & Mulligan, 1856.
- "Philosophy of Money: A New Currency and a New Credit System," article in symposium of unknown origin. 1863.
- General Introduction to Social Science: Part First: Introduction to Fourier's Theory of Social Organization. New York, NY: C.P. Somerby, 1876.

== Footnotes ==
=== Sources ===
- Brisbane, Albert (2005). Mellen, Abigail; Stallsmith, Allaire Brisbane (eds.). the European Travel Diaries of Albert Brisbane, 1830-1832: Discovering Fourierism for America. Lewiston, NY: Mellen. ISBN 9780773460706. OCLC 60590148.
- Brisbane, Redelia (1893). Albert Brisbane: A Mental Biography with a Character Study by his Wife. Boston, MA, US: Arena Publishing Co. OCLC 558039428 – via Internet Archive.
- Guarneri, Carl J. (1991). The Utopian Alternative: Fourierism in Nineteenth-century America. Ithaca and London: Cornell University Press. ISBN 9781501725289. OCLC 645707565 – via Internet Archive.
- Hillquit, Morris (1910) [1900]. "Chapter III: The Fourierist Period". History of socialism in the United States (5th ed.). New York: Funk & Wagnalls. pp. 70–91. OCLC 697792708 – via Internet Archive.
- Hoagland, Henry E. (1918). "Part IV Humanitarianism (1840–1860), Chapter II Association and Co-operation". In Commons, John R.; et al. (eds.). History of Labour in the United States. Vol. v. 1. New York: The Macmillan Company. pp. 493–521. OCLC 761856568.
