= Skaneateles Falls, New York =

Skaneateles Falls
- Unincorporated community
- Location within the state of New York
- Coordinates: 42°59′35″N 76°27′22″W
- Country: United States
- State: New York
- County: Onondaga

Population (2010)
  - Total: 399
- Time zone: UTC-5 (Eastern (EST))
  - Summer (DST): UTC-4 (EDT)
- ZIP codes: 13153
- Area code: 315

Skaneateles Falls is a community on Skaneateles Creek in Onondaga County, New York, United States.

It is the closest community to Community Place, a former Fourierist utopian commune.
