= The Phalanx =

American Fourierist journal

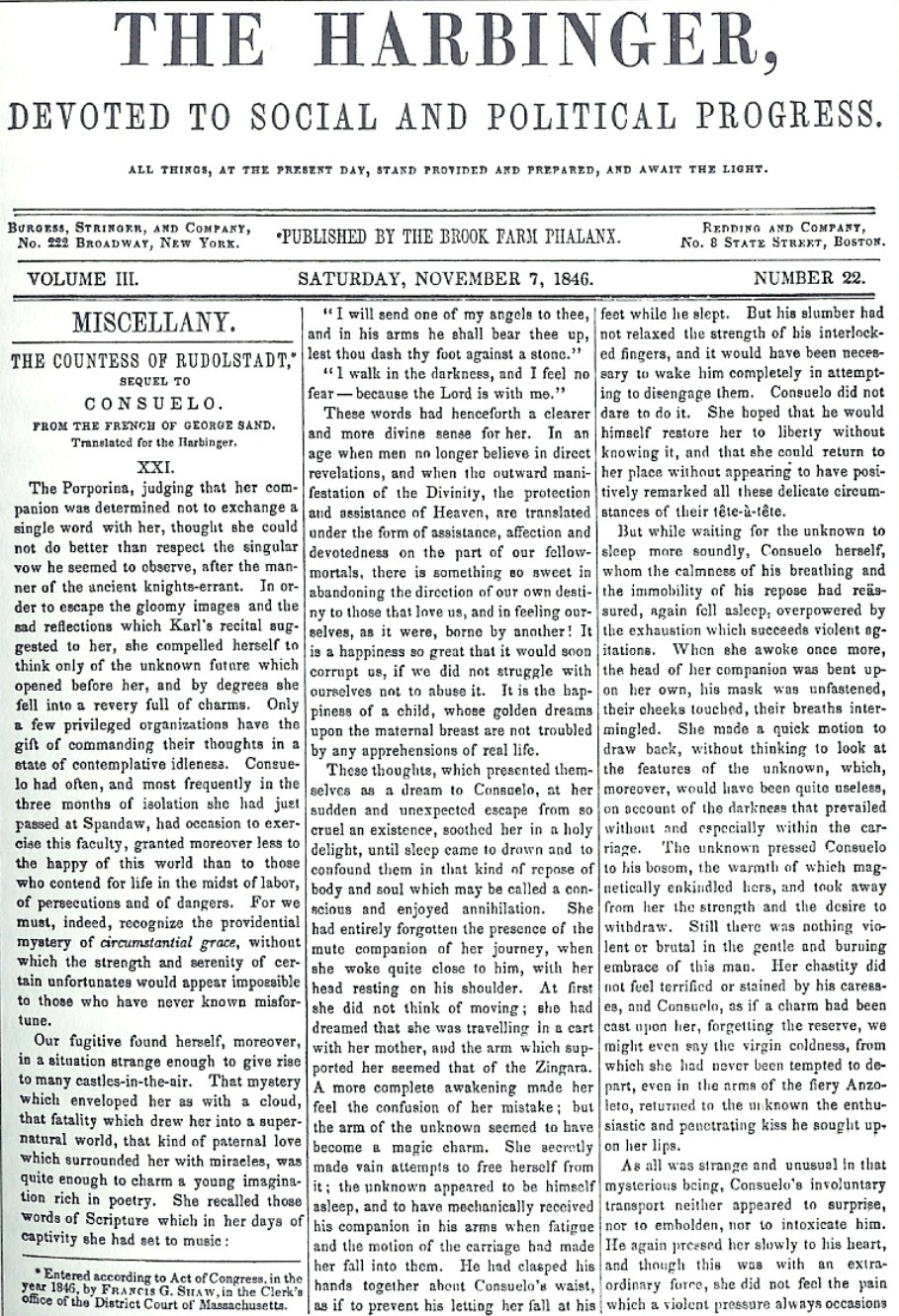
November 7, 1846, issue of The Harbinger, a later incarnation of The Phalanx

The Phalanx; or Journal of Social Science was a Fourierist journal published in New York City, edited by Albert Brisbane and Osborne Macdaniel from 1843 to 1845.

The Phalanx was eventually moved, along with another publication called The Social Reformer to Brook Farm in West Roxbury, Massachusetts. They became one journal called The Harbinger; its first issue was published on June 14, 1845. Its first issue under this title announced its mission:

The interests of Social Reform will be paramount to all others in whatever is admitted into the pages of the Harbinger. We shall suffer no attachment to literature, no taste for abstract discussion, no love of purely intellectual theories, to seduce us from our devotion to the cause of the oppressed, the down trodden, the insulted and injured masses of our fellow men. Every pulsation of our being vibrates in sympathy with the wrongs of the toiling millions; and every wise effort for their speedy enfranchisement will find in us resolute and indomitable advocates.

After Brook Farm's dissolution, the publication was eventually moved to New York City under the editorial control of George Ripley and Charles Anderson Dana where it continued weekly until October 1847. In addition to Ripley and Dana, early contributors to The Harbinger included Parke Godwin, James Russell Lowell, William Wetmore Story, John Greenleaf Whittier, and Nathaniel Parker Willis. Edgar Allan Poe, who strongly distrusted the Utopian movements, referred to The Harbinger as "the most reputable organ of the Crazyites".
