= Hill-Rom =

American medical technology provider

Hill-Rom Holdings, Inc.
- Type: Subsidiary
- Traded as: Nasdaq: HRC
- Industry: Medical device manufacturer
- Founded: 1915; 111 years ago, in Batesville, Indiana
- Headquarters: Chicago, Illinois, U.S.
- Key people: John Groetelaars (president & CEO)
- Products: Hospital smart beds and surfaces, patient monitors, care communications, lifts, physical exam and diagnostics, vision screening, respiratory health, surgical tables, IT solutions, and smart care services
- Revenue: US$2.91 billion (2019)
- Number of employees: 10,000 (2018)
- Parent: Baxter International
- Website: www.hillrom.com

Hill-Rom Holdings, Inc. is an American medical technology provider that is a subsidiary of Baxter International.

== History ==
Hillrom is a wholly owned subsidiary of Baxter and was formally part of Hill-Rom Holdings, Inc., which was formerly a part of Hillenbrand Industries until that company split its medical equipment division from their casket business in 2008. Their headquarters are in Chicago, Illinois.

John Groetelaars was the president and CEO. In 2019, Hill-Rom rebranded itself as Hillrom. The rebranding emphasized the company's transition from its history of developing hospital beds and medical devices to a focus on digital health products and software that support connected care across the healthcare continuum for the digital health market. Its primary products are Nurse Call Hospital Alert and Communications System, Hillrom HPL (high precision locating) Staff and Asset Tracking and they also offer Healthcare Furniture such as the smart connected Centrella Hospital beds.

In September 2015, Hillrom bought Welch Allyn Inc. Hillrom continued to use the Welch Allyn brand name for some of its patient monitoring and diagnostic equipment.

In 2018, Hillrom updated its hospital bed model to include EarlySense's vital-sign bed sensors to monitor patients' heart and respiratory rates. The built-in sensors sit under the mattress and are not attached to the patient. They check vital signs 100 times a minute and alert nurses to any possible issues.

In April 2019, Hillrom acquired Voalte. The acquisition gave Hillrom control of a connected care system that supplies voice, alarm, and text communications for 220,000 clinicians at different healthcare organizations. Voalte became a cornerstone of Hillrom's Care Communications product line. Before its rebranding, Hillrom also developed and produced medical equipment under the names of its previous acquisitions: Welch Allyn, Mortara Instrument, Trumpf Medical, Allen Medical, and Liko. Another acquisition, Aspen Surgical, was sold in 2019.

In January 2020, Hillrom acquired Excel Medical Electronics, a clinical communications software company. Excel Medical expanded Hillrom's digital health offerings with predictive analytics and software that assimilates real-time patient data.

Hillrom's Centrella bed won the 2017 Stanley Caplan User Centered Design Award. Hillrom developed the bed after studying patients in 29 hospital units. In June 2020, Hillrom released a remote vital signs monitoring product to help with COVID treatment. The Welch Allyn Spot Vital Signs 4400 device connects to the Hillrom Connex app to relay patient data securely to physicians through a phone.

Hillrom development teams practice contextual inquiry and an immersion process. This development process requires them to spend time in environments and situations in order to understand the reality of clinical practice, workflow, and patient experience.

In 2020, Hillrom adapted its respiratory health device MetaNeb to help treat COVID-19 patients. MetaNeb is typically used on patients with pneumonia. It attaches to a ventilator and helps to clear the lungs from mucus secretions. In April 2020, Atlanta's Emory University reported the successful use of MetaNeb with coronavirus patients on ventilators.

In 2022 Hillrom announced its new High Precision Locating (HPL) system for staff and asset tracking which integrates with its Nurse Call system. It uses Ultra Wide Band (UWB) technology to provide real-time location in the system and on a visualized map.

In September 2021, Baxter International announced it would acquire Hillrom for $12.4 billion. The acquisition was completed in December 2021.

== Services ==
Care Communications: Hillrom provides a secure communications platform that connects healthcare professionals with patients. The platform uses voice calls, alarm notifications, and text alerts.

Patient Support Systems: Hillrom offers different products to support patient care, such as smart beds and patient lifts.

Front Line Care: This includes a diverse range of products used by frontline care providers to diagnose and manage patient health issues, such as ventilators and vital signs monitoring systems.

Surgical Solutions: The company provides a line of surgical products, including surgical and examination lights, gyn/uro/pal products, surgical tables, and orthopedic and spine products.
