= Socialist antisemitism =

Socialist antisemitism concerns the manifestation of antisemitism in socialist movements and appears in various forms. While this phenomenon has been the subject of a significant number of scholarly writings, it is viewed by researchers as an understudied topic. Researchers have argued that while socialists were not all prejudiced against Jews, some socialist movements did harbor antisemitic views. Others extend their argument with the assertion that modern socialism is characterised by a longstanding antisemitic tradition.

== Overview ==
Some researchers have argued that in certain historical settings, the writings of Karl Marx have been interpreted in such a manner that allowed for a socialist antisemitism to be manifest. Other researchers have argued that the most important element in nineteenth-century socialist antisemitism concerns the role of fascism in the context of the socialist intellectual history.

European socialists and Jews have had a complex relationship. While socialist parties in the early 20th century aimed to create a classless society, they also grappled with antisemitism within their ranks and among the working class, and socialist antisemitism in this period was treated as distinct from racial and clerical variants of anti-Jewish prejudice. In Britain, Jewish workers were at times paradoxically viewed as a super-exploited fraction of the working class, but also an alien body, whose interests were antithetical to those of British workers.

One understudied area is the history of antisemitism in Dutch labor unions, especially concerning early socialist leaders like Ferdinand Domela Nieuwenhuis. Researchers argue that prejudice against Dutch Jews explains why Dutch Jewish workers were late in joining socialist movements. Apparently, this was because Domela Nieuwenhuis used stereotypes about Jews to attack his opponents, who relied on Jewish diamond cutters for support. After this conflict ended, antisemitism became less central a feature in Dutch labor unions.

Lucien Chaze, French politician and mayor of Mustapha (1900-1903), has been described by researchers as one of the most active leaders of socialist antisemitism in French Algeria.

In 1915, the Labor Party politician, Frank Anstey, a proponent of socialism in Australia, published a pamphlet, The Kingdom of Shylock, which included antisemitic elements, some of which he removed in a later republication. Due to its antisemitic content, the circulation of the original pamphlet was suppressed.

== Postwar period ==
The 1968 Polish political crisis saw the rise of an antisemitic effort by the Polish United Workers' Party to rid Jewish academics from their posts.

In Hungary, between the 1950s and the 1970s, the Hungarian Socialist Workers’ Party (HSWP) adopted policies to adapt older antisemitic language as proported anti-Zionist rhetoric in order to shift antisemitic manifestations within the party without the need to substantially address the issue. The move was viewed by the Hungarian Jewish community as a cynical ploy. Furthermore, the HSWP placed significant restrictions on the practice of the Jewish faith, especially the Sabbath.

== See also ==
- Antisemitism is the socialism of fools
