= Alphadelphia Association =

Fourierist commune

Alphadelphia Association was a Fourierist commune established near Galesburg, Michigan, in Comstock Township, Michigan in 1844. The commune was led by Dr. H. R. Schetterly, a German physician. The association purchased three thousand acres (12 km^{2}) of land of land and constructed a large mansion. At its peak, the community likely had around 300 members, and by 1846, the common property was valued at $43,897.21. The commune disbanded in 1848.

Two of the primary founders were Reverend Richard Thornton and Reverend James Billings, both Universalist preachers. They also published the commune's newspaper, The Alphadelphia Tocsin, from 1844 to 1846.
