= Harry Kraemer =

Business executive, author and professor (b. 1955)

- Born: 1955 (age 70–71)
- Education: BA, Lawrence University, 1977; MBA, Kellogg School of Management, Northwestern University, 1979
- Occupations: Business Executive, author, Leadership Professor,
- Known for: Value-based Leadership concept
- Website: harrykraemer.org

Harry M. Jansen Kraemer Jr. (born 1955) is an American business executive, leadership author, and professor; currently the Clinical Professor of Leadership at the Kellogg School of Management at Northwestern University. Harry Kraemer is the former chairman and chief executive officer of Baxter International Inc.

== Career ==
Kraemer joined Baxter International Inc. in 1982 as Director of Corporate Development. While at Baxter, he also served as President, beginning in 1997, and Chairman, starting at 2000. He spent 23 years at Baxter, leaving in 2004. His last five years at Baxter International Inc. were spent as CEO.

When Kraemer was leaving Baxter, Donald Jacobs, Dean Emeritus at Kellogg School of Management, asked him to teach at Kellogg. In 2005 Harry Kraemer started teaching a course called Managerial Leadership at Kellogg School of Management. The structure of the course is created by Kraemer and called "Value-based Leadership." He was named the 2008 Kellogg School Professor of the Year. Harry Kraemer is also the author of the best-selling book "From Values to Action: The Four Principles of Values-Based Leadership" and "Becoming The Best: Build a World-Class Organization Through Values-Based Leadership." Kraemer's value-based leadership has four principles:

- self-reflection;
- balance;
- true self-confidence;
- genuine humility.

== Personal life ==
Kraemer married Julie Kraemer in 1980, together, they have five children. They live in Wilmette, Illinois.
