= Fourierism =

Ideology asserting the inevitability of communal association

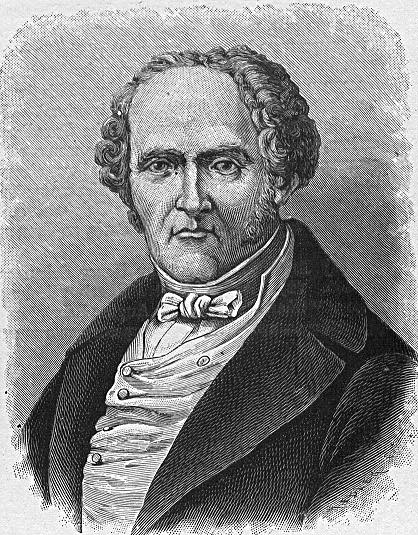
Fourierism is the set of ideas first put forward by French utopian socialist François Marie Charles Fourier (1772–1837).

Fourierism (/ˈfʊəriərɪzəm/) is the systematic set of economic, political, and social beliefs first espoused by French intellectual Charles Fourier (1772–1837). It is based on a belief in the inevitability of communal associations of people who work and live together as part of the human future. Fourier's supporters called his doctrines associationism. Political contemporaries and subsequent scholarship have identified Fourier's set of ideas as a form of utopian socialism.

Never tested in practice at any scale in Fourier's lifetime, Fourierism enjoyed a brief boom in the United States during the mid-1840s owing largely to the efforts of his American popularizer, Albert Brisbane (1809–1890), and the American Union of Associationists, but ultimately failed as a social and economic model. The system was briefly revived in the mid-1850s by Victor Considerant (1808–1893), a French disciple of Fourier's who unsuccessfully attempted to relaunch the model in Texas in the 1850s.

== Doctrine ==
=== Passional attraction ===
In contrast to the thoroughly secular communitarianism of his contemporary Robert Owen (1771–1858), Charles Fourier's thinking starts from a presumption of the existence of God and a divine social order on Earth in accordance with the will of God. Fourier saw himself as a figure of world-historical importance akin to Isaac Newton for having identified the fundamental force driving social development, which he called "passional attraction" (attraction passionelle).

Fourier believed that the structure of the world—its economic, political, and social system—inhibited humanity from the pursuit of its God-given individual passions, thereby preventing it from achieving universal harmony. Rather than seeking to mold individuals to fit the existing form of economic, political, and social life, as had been the traditional goal of the educational and what we today call the socialization process, Fourier believed that instead the form of economic, political, and social life should itself be altered to fit the inherent passions of the individual, since these economic and social structures were manmade and not God-given.

Through conscious understanding of this process, which Fourier called "social science", new economic and social formations called "associations" could be created, structured so as to allow people to follow their passions and thereby advance toward universal harmony.

Fourier listed 12 basic passions of humanity grouped around three branches of a "passional tree": "luxurious passions" of the five senses; "affective passions" of love, friendship, and parenthood; and "distributive passions", such as the need for political intrigue, the need for variety, and the pure enthusiasm of spiritual pursuits. The sum of all these passions Fourier called "unityism", characterized as a universal feeling of benevolence and fraternity. Although fettered and mutated by Civilization, the free development of these passions would be allowed in the bright future world, Fourier believed.

=== Stages of society ===
Fourier believed himself the discoverer of the universal laws of societal evolution, theorizing the existence of 32 distinct periods beginning with Edenism and continuing through Savagery, Patriarchate, and Barbarism. Each of these stages was held to have distinctive material and ideological features, with the treatment afforded to women a particular marker of one stage from the next. Of far greater concern to Fourier and his disciples was the current 5th form of society, Modern Society, as well as three emerging forms believed to be just around the corner: 6 (Guarantism), 7 (Simple Association), and 8 (Compound Association).

"Modern Society", from the Fourierist perspective, was based upon capital and labor and the buying and selling of goods through a network of useless middlemen. With a sneer, Fourier called contemporary society "Civilization", deeming it the cause of fraud, waste, and human unhappiness. The "isolated family" he deemed inefficient, the wage system demoralizing and exploitative, and organized religion corrupt. An entire book was written detailing 36 types of bankruptcy and 76 sorts of "cuckoldry" to which humanity was subjected by its system of so-called Civilization, which Fourier saw as wholly unacceptable.

Fourier believed that, fortunately for humanity, Civilization was a fleeting economic formation, soon to vanish. The emerging socioeconomic structure of "Guarantism" would be based upon the fundamental principle of universal insurance, Fourier believed, which was to guarantee the security of capital and the right of labor to gainful employment. Petty traders and speculative profiteers would be eliminated from the economy in this new system of organized production and distribution.

The next stage in the Fourierist schema, "Simple Association", was to be based upon the cooperative enterprise of like bodies of farmers or artisans or industrial workers as distinct groups. Farmers would associate with other farmers, artisans with other artisans, industrial producers with other industrial producers, producing and selling their goods collectively. Simultaneously, these economic organizations would for the first time include the association of family living and domestic labor, thereby eliminating the economic waste and social isolation of individual living. Wage labor would be eliminated, as the members of these associations would be co-proprietors, producing in tandem and sharing alike in the proceeds of their efforts.

Subsequently, the Fourierists believed, there would emerge "Compound Association" or "Harmonism". Under Compound Association all pursuits would join in large associations that would shatter all economic lines. One Fourierian enthusiast described the system of Compound Association in the following terms:

Every interest is provided for, by an organization which embraces all details of production and distribution; and a system of natural and integral education is instituted—that is, a complete system of physical, mental, and emotional development, intimately connected with daily pursuits, provided for; that art and the science which underlies art may be taught together; that theory and practice may go hand in hand and that the individual may have the command of his whole personal power and enjoy the conditions of expressing it.

Every individual in these Compound Associations would be free to take part in the labor of a dozen or more different work groups, according to their interests and pleasure, over the course of any year. What Marxists called alienation of labor would thereby be eliminated and production boosted, since "a man having himself on his own side works with more force, greater skill, and better effect than one who works against his inclinations," in the words of one Fourierian.

=== Economics ===
Fourier believed that economic output was the product of three factors: labor, capital, and talent. Each of these, he argued, was important to production and needed to be compensated as such for the general prosperity of the organized association. The communal associations based upon Fourier's ideas were generally formed as joint stock companies, and their investor-members were compensated separately on the basis both of amount of capital invested and amount of labor performed, with labor time given a range of values based on both the necessity and difficulty of the work and the degree of talent and skill with which it was performed.

=== Social life ===
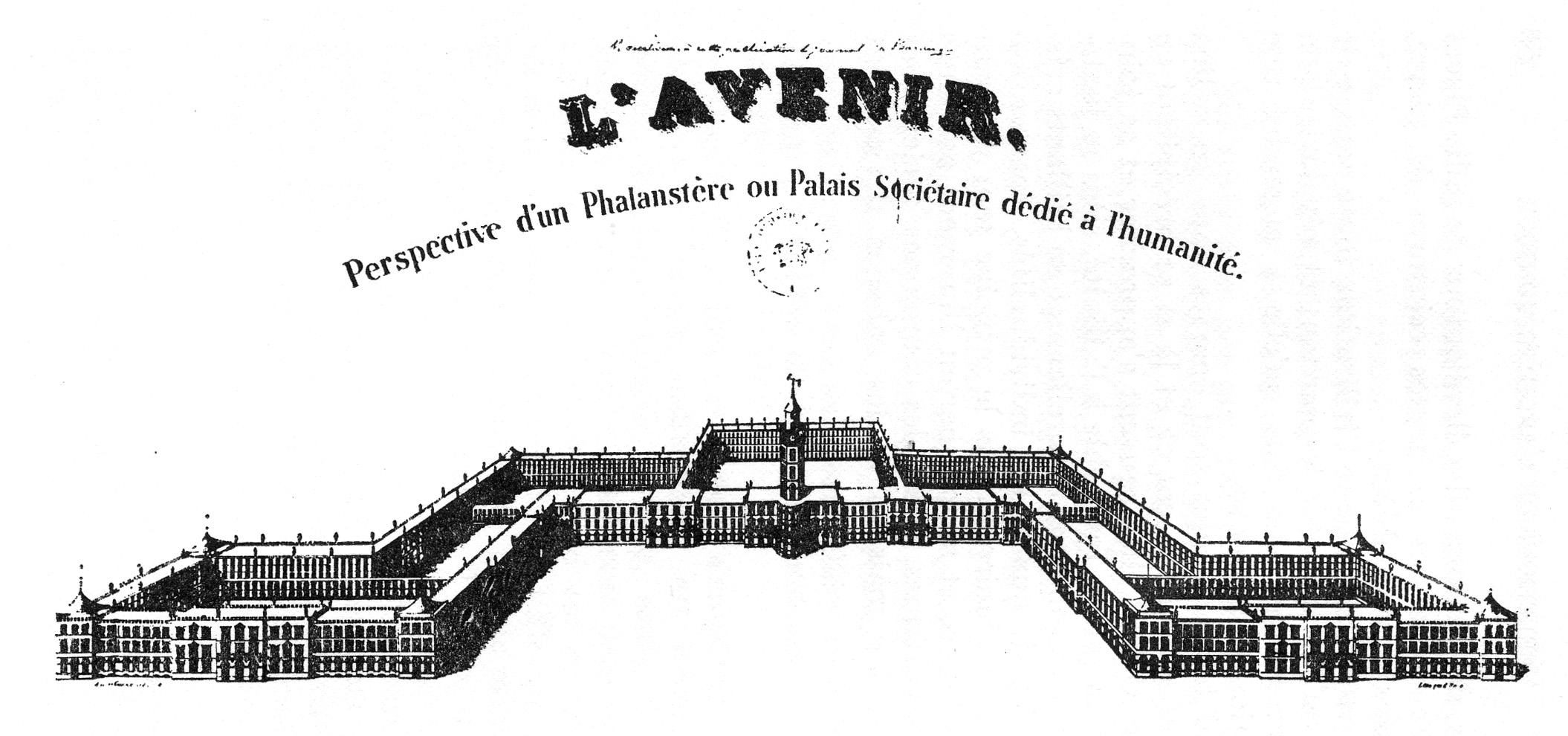
Elevated view of a Fourierist Phalanstère from the works of Victor Considerant

Fourier's prescription was the establishment of communities called Phalanxes or Associations in the countryside. Housed inside gigantic serpentine edifices called "phalanstries" would be 1620 people of various occupations and social classes. The residents were to be arranged in occupational "series"—major divisions such as between agrarians and industrial producers and artisans—that would be further divided into smaller "groups" to cooperatively conduct specific aspects of the work. Mobility of the individual between various groups and even sections according to personal desires was to be allowed.

Fundamental to the Fourierian ideal was the notion of collective living and the rational performance of domestic duties. Individual households were seen as both wasteful in terms of duplicated effort performed and isolating of individuals—standing in the way of true cooperation and social harmony.

Remaining in unpublished manuscript form until 1967 were Fourier's imaginative predictions about degrees of sexual promiscuity and the institutions and moral codes that would emerge to govern love and interpersonal relationships in the harmonious world of Compound Association.

=== Role of force ===
The Fourierian system of associations was based on voluntary participation and expansion through the force of example. Once founded, associations would demonstrate their practical merits and inspire emulation, with the first model communities replicating and spreading from localities to regions to nations and internationally. Never in his writings does Fourier appeal to governmental legislation or coercive power of any sort, instead believing association to be a natural and wholly voluntary structure, part of a Divine Social Code.

Moreover, the achievement on an international scale would eliminate war. Instead, industrial armies would form to engage in gigantic reclamation projects, irrigating deserts, restoring vegetation, draining marshes and cultivating the land. The elimination of disease would follow, as such banes as cholera, typhus, and yellow fever would vanish with the unhealthful places whence they originated before society's restorative efforts. Through the planting of vast swaths of timber, cropland would be protected and the Earth's climate would be slowly transformed, Fourier believed.

=== Fantastic theories ===
Fourier's theoretical system, described by one scholar as "vast and eccentric", was only part of the output of what another called "a most riotous and unpruned imagination". Fourier believed that in the new world people would live for 144 years, that new species of friendly and pacifistic animals such as "anti-lions" would emerge, and that over time human beings would develop long and useful tails. Fourier also professed a belief in the ability of human souls to migrate between physical and "aromal" worlds. Such thinking was set aside during the last 15 years of Fourier's life, when he instead began to concentrate on testing his economic and social ideas.

Fourier's disciples, including Albert Brisbane and Victor Considerant, later pared down his writings into a comprehensible system for economic and social organization, with the Fourierist movement experiencing a brief boom in the United States during the mid-1840s, when some 30 Fourierist associations were established.

=== Influence on new religious movements ===
The Fourierist doctrine of attractions, correspondences, and analogies was identified with esoteric doctrines like Martinism by Fourierists like Just Muiron from an early point on. Louis Reybaud, the author of the first study of the socialists, perceived Fourierism and other early socialist schools in the context of mysticism, magic, kabbalah, or the occult sciences. Fourierism exerted a decisive influence on new religious movements like Spiritualism and Occultism after 1848. Before that, Fourierism had already coined the ideas of US-American spiritualist thinkers such as Andrew Jackson Davis. Eliphas Lévi, who is regarded as the founder of modern occultism, was an adherent of Fourierism in the 1840s. Until the early 20th century, there was a strong Fourierist presence in French socialist-spiritualist circles.

== See also ==
- List of Fourierist Associations in the United States
- Albert Brisbane
- The Phalanx/The Harbinger, an American Fourierist newspaper of the 1840s.
- American Union of Associationists
- Kibbutz
- W. E. Smythe
- Utopian socialism
