= List of American utopian communities =

A wide range of utopian intentional communities were founded across US since the 1800s. Several of them are active in the present day.

Harmonites dominated in the early 1800s.

Secular utopian socialism in the US during the 19th century included adherents of Owenism of the 1820s, Fourierism (American Union of Associationists) (1843–1850), Icarianism (1848–1898), and Bellamyism of the Brotherhood of the Cooperative Commonwealth (1889–1896), based on Edward Bellamy's 1888 book Looking Backward and his 1893 plan for self-sufficient agricultural settlements.

As well, several anarchist communities were established in the U.S. These included Home, Washington (founded in 1898) and the Socialist Community of Modern Times, founded in New York in 1851.

== Seventeenth and eighteenth centuries ==
Name	Location	Founder	Founding date	Ending date	Notes
Province of Carolina (British Colony of Carolina)	Carolina		1670	1711-1729	Chartered as a restoration colony, it was planned as a utopian society with an integrated physical, economic and social design. Cooper, Earl of Shaftesbury, with the assistance of his secretary, the philosopher John Locke, drafted the Grand Model for the Province of Carolina, Carolina's constitution, which was influenced by the utopian aspirations of James Harrington. Settlers were promised religious freedom and free land. Unrest led to Cary's rebellion in 1711. Became a royal colony in 1729.
Province of Pennsylvania (British colony of Pennsylvania)	Pennsylvania	William Penn	1681		Chartered as a restoration colony. Inspired by the writings of James Harrington. Planned as a utopian society with an integrated physical, economic and social design
Ephrata Cloister AKA Ephrata Community	Lancaster County, Pennsylvania	Johann Conrad Beissel	1732	1934	Founded as a monastic religious community. Restructured as a both-gender community in 1814. Branches were established at other locations, of which two are said to still exist today.
Province of Georgia (British colony of Georgia)	Georgia	General James Oglethorpe	1733		Inspired by writings of James Harrington. Oglethorpe planned the colony to be a utopian society with an integrated physical, economic and social design. Liquor and slavery were prohibited. "Agrarian equality" in which land was allocated equally. Acquisition of land through purchase or inheritance was prohibited. The plan was an early step toward the yeoman republic later envisioned by Thomas Jefferson. Prohibitions against liquor, slavery and private land ownership were lifted in 1749 and 1751, fundamentally ending Georgia's utopian experiment.

== Nineteenth century ==
Name	Location	Founder	Founding date	Ending date	Notes
Harmony	Pennsylvania	George Rapp	1805	1814	A Harmonites village. The Harmony Society is a Christian theosophy and pietist society founded in Iptingen, Germany, in 1785.
New Harmony, Indiana	Indiana	George Rapp	1814	1824	A Harmonites village. Colonists were formerly living in Harmony, Pennsylvania. Moved out to Old Economy Village. Sold the property to Robert Owen who himself founded a short-lived utopian settlement there.
Zoar	Ohio	Joseph Bimeler	1817	1898	Founded by German religious separatists who wanted religious freedom in America. Prosperous by the 1890s when it was one of the three strongest communistic societies in the U.S.
Old Economy Village	Pennsylvania	George Rapp	1824	1906 (last leaders died in 1951)	A Harmonites village. Colonists formerly lived in Harmony and New Harmony.
New Harmony	Indiana	Robert Owen	1825	1829	Former Harmonite village bought by British reformer Robert Owen. It then became a short-lived Owenite colony. Josiah Warren formed his anarchist beliefs from his experience there.
Nashoba	Tennessee	Frances Wright	1825	1828	An abolitionist, free-love community inspired by New Harmony, Indiana. (LEP). History covered in 1963 book Nashoba written by Edd Winfield Parks.
United Order	Jackson County, Missouri, Ohio, Utah	Joseph Smith	1832	1874	Based on the Law of Consecration, a revelation from Joseph Smith who was the founder of The Church of Jesus Christ of Latter-Day Saints and Mormonism
New Philadelphia Colony	Pennsylvania	Bernhard Müller	1832	1833	A libertarian socialist community
Oberlin Colony	Ohio	John J. Shipherd and 8 immigrant families	1833	1843	Community based on Communal ownership of property
Community of United Christians at Berea, Ohio	Berea, Ohio	educator John Baldwin and Methodist circuit preachers James Gilruth and Henry Olcott Sheldon	1836	1837	Intended to be an ideal Christian community (referred to as a lyceum village). The founders pooled their land and hoped to create a Utopian "Community of United Christians." Members of the Community vowed to avoid all luxuries and temptations that would prevent them from achieving the Methodist ideal of "sanctification," or perfect love of God. Baldwin later helped found Baldwin Wallace College.
Brook Farm (Brook Farm Institute of Agriculture and Education)	Massachusetts	George Ripley; Sophia Ripley	1841	1846	A Transcendent community. Transcendentalism is based on belief in the inherent goodness of people and nature and on benefits of being truly "self-reliant". Under influence of Albert Brisbane, it adopted Fourierist principles in 1844.
North American Phalanx	New Jersey	Charles Sears	1841	1856	A Fourier Society community. The Fourier Society is based on the ideas of French philosopher Charles Fourier. Longest-lasting of the 30 or so Fourierist communities in the U.S.
Northampton Association of Education and Industry (NAEI) (sometimes called "The Community")	Florence, Northampton, Massachusetts	Samuel Hill	1842	1846	Abolitionist community. Owned some 500 acres, a silk factory, and a sawmill. Workers did not get a wage but a profit share. (see Clark, Christopher, The Communitarian Moment: The Radical Challenge of the Northampton Association. Ithaca, NY: Cornell University Press, 1995)
Hopedale Community	Massachusetts	Adin Ballou	1842	1868	A Fourierist community based on "Practical Christianity", which included ideas such as temperance, abolitionism, Women's rights, spiritualism and education.
Fruitlands	Massachusetts	Amos Alcott	1843	1844	A Transcendent community.
Skaneateles Community	New York	Society for Universal Inquiry	1843	1846	A Society for Universal Inquiry and Reform community, based on Fourierist principles at least at first.
Sodus Bay Phalanx	New York	Sodus Bay Fourierists	1844	1846	A Fourierist community.
Wisconsin Phalanx	Wisconsin	Albert Brisbane	1844	1850	A Fourierist community. One of the longest-lived phalanxes of the 1840s Fourierist boom in the U.S.
Clermont Phalanx	Ohio	Followers of Charles Fourier	1844	1845	A Fourierist community. replaced by Spiritualist community. later became anarchist society.
Prairie Home Community (also known as "Grand Prairie Community")	Ohio	John O. Wattles; Valentine Nicholson	1844	1845	A Society for Universal Inquiry and Reform community. Ascribed to Fourierist principles.
Alphadelphia Association	Kalamazoo County, Michigan	Reverend Richard Thornton, Reverend James Billings, Dr. H. R. Schetterly	1844	1848	Fourierist community. Published commune's newspaper, The Alphadelphia Tocsin
Fruit Hills	Ohio	Orson S. Murray	1845	1852	A community based on Owenism and anarchism. Maintained close contact with the Kristeen and Grand Prairie Communities.
Kristeen Community	Indiana	Charles Mowland	1845	1847	Founded by Charles Mowland and others who had previously been associated with the Prairie Home Community. A Society for Universal Inquiry and Reform community.
Bishop Hill Colony	Illinois	Eric Jansson	1846	1862	A Swedish Pietist religious commune.
Spring Farm Colony	Wisconsin	Six Fourierist families	1846	1848	A Fourierist community.
Utopia	Ohio	Josiah Warren	1847	1876	Decentralized community based on equitable commerce or mutualism. replaced a Spiritualist community that in turn had replaced a Fourierist community.
Oneida Community	New York	John H. Noyes	1848	1880	A religious Utopian socialist community. Oneida Community practices included Bible communism, Complex Marriage, Free love, Stirpiculture, Male Continence, Mutual Criticism and Ascending Fellowship. Other Noyesian communities were founded in Wallingford, Connecticut; Newark, New Jersey; Putney and Cambridge, Vermont.
Icarians Nauvoo, Icaria, etc.	Texas; Nauvoo, Illinois; Corning, Iowa; Cheltenham, Missouri; Cloverdale, California	Étienne Cabet	1848	1898	Egalitarian communities based on the French utopian movement founded by Cabet, after his followers emigrated to the US.
Amana Colonies	Amana (CDP), Iowa	Community of True Inspiration	1850s	1932	The Amana villages were built one hour apart when traveling by ox cart. Each village had a church, a farm, multi-family residences, workshops and communal kitchens. Operated woolen and flour mills. Prosperous by the 1890s when it was one of the three strongest communistic societies in the U.S. Its communal aspects narrowed in 1932, but its extensive holdings of farm and woodland never divided. Gave rise to the Amana Corporation, a maker of kitchen appliances.
Modern Times	Brentwood, New York	Josiah Warren and Stephen Pearl Andrews	1851	1864	Founded upon individual sovereignty, equitable commerce and mutualism.
Raritan Bay Union	New Jersey	Marcus Spring; Rebecca Buffum	1853	1858	A Fourierist community.
Aurora Colony	Oregon	William Keil	1853	1883	Christian utopian community
Free Lovers at Davis House	Berlin Heights, Erie County, Ohio	Francis Barry	1854	1858	A community based on Free love and spiritualism.
Reunion Colony	Dallas, Texas	Victor P. Considerant	1855	1869	A Fourierist community.
Octagon City	Kansas	Henry S. Clubb; Charles DeWolfe; John McLaurin	1856	1857	Originally built as a vegetarian colony north of the present-day site of Chanute, Kansas near Vegetarian Creek, a tributary of the Neosho River
Workingmen's Co-operative Colony (Llewellyn Castle)	Kansas	followers of James Bronterre O'Brien	1869	1874	A community based on the political reform philosophy of Chartist James Bronterre O'Brien.
Silkville	Kansas	Ernest de Boissière	1869	1892	Sericulture farm in Kansas that was founded on Fourierist principles. Later shifted away from Fourierism before its collapse.
Union Colony (Greeley)	Colorado	Nathan Meeker	1870	?	An agricultural temperance community bankrolled by Horace Greeley. Initiated by Nathan Meeker with an article in The New York Tribune in Nov 1869. Meeker selected 800 people from letters submitted and started the colony in May 1870. Still a thriving community but gradually moved away from the ideas of utopia and temperance.
Progressive Colony, near Cedar Vale	Kansas	William Frey	1871	1879	A Russian communist colony with a mixture of atheism and liberal Christianity. Fell apart due to the domineering and sometimes cruel manner of its founder.
Zion Valley	Kansas	William Bickerton	1875	1879	Bickertonite Mormon religious colony that secularized in 1879 to become the town of St. John, Kansas.
Danish Socialist Colony	Kansas	Louis Pio	1877	1877	A utopian socialist community near Hays
Esperanza	Kansas	Alcander Longley	1877	1879	A utopian communist community founded by settlers from Missouri.
Rugby	Tennessee	Thomas Hughes (author of bestseller Tom Brown's School Days (1857)); London and Boston Boards of Aid to Land Ownership	1880	1887	A community based on Christian socialism. “Associations” (joint-stock corporations) operated general store and other businesses. A tomato cannery and Rugby Pottery Company operated as joint-stock enterprise but failed financially. Hughes left scene in 1887, $250,000 poorer.
Am Olam	Oregon and various locations across the US	Mania Bakl and Moses Herder	1881	Mostly disbanded by the 1890s	Jewish social movement that sought to create agricultural communities in America.
Shalam Colony	New Mexico	John B. Newbrough; Andrew Howland	1884	1901	A community in which members would live peaceful, vegetarian lifestyles, and where orphaned urban children were to be raised.
Kaweah Colony	Sierra Nevada range, California		1886	1892	Inspired by the scientific socialism of Laurence Gronlund and Edward Bellamy. Livelihood based on logging of giant sequoia trees. This ended with creation of the Sequoia National Park. "Squatter's Cabin" is last surviving structure of the colony.
Topolobampo Colony	Topolobampo, Mexico	Albert Kimsey Owen	1886	1896	Located on Mexican soil, this Georgist utopian socialist intentional community was American in origin, membership, and in leadership. Lack of funding ultimately led to the colony's failure in 1896.
Ruskin Colony	Dickson County, Tennessee	Julius Wayland	1894	1899	Attempt to create a co-operative communal movement. Principles of the community were inspired by Edward Bellamy's utopian novel, Looking Backward (1886). Communal dining hall and laundry, housing, medical care, education, equality, and job security. success hampered by no clear business plan. Eventually some members forced sale of land and disbandment.
Glennis Cooperative Industrial Colony	near Clear Lake, Puget Sound, Washington State	Oliver Verity, George Allen and Frank Odell	1894	1895	Inspired by Bellamy's book, Looking Backward, 2000–1887. Established with the goal “own and operate manufactories, to acquire land, to build houses for its employees; to insure the employees against want, or the fear of want; and to maintain harmonious social relationships on the basis of cooperation.” started as farm, suffered agricultural problems and broke up. Part of the dissension was apparently from the persuasive anarchist teaching done by Tacoma tailor Andrew Klemencic. Glennis's founders tried again at the Home Colony, Key Peninsula.
Altruria	California	Edward Byron Payne	1894	1896	Christian socialist colony inspired by William Dean Howells' 1884 novel A Traveler from Altruria.
Fairhope Single Tax Corporation, Fairhope, AL	Alabama	Fairhope Industrial Association	1894	currently active	Fairhope was first settled in 1894 by Georgists. The Single tax experiment was incorporated as the Fairhope Single Tax Corporation under Alabama law in 1904. The municipality of Fairhope was incorporated in 1908.
Koreshan Unity	Estero, Florida	Cyrus Teed	1894	Last new member admitted in 1940 (died 1982)	Believed in Teed as a Messiah named Koresh, entered heavy decline after Teed's death in 1908.
Harmony	Washington	Community conversion	1895	1899	The existing community of Harmony attempted to become an ideal settlement based on "unselfish principles of co-operation and brotherly love" under its articles of incorporation. Settlers were required to accept socialism and be Caucasian of good moral character. Lacking new members outside of the county, the attempt was discontinued in 1899.
Home Colony	Washington	George H. Allen; Oliver A. Verity; B. F. O'Dell	1895	1919	An intentional community based on anarchist philosophy
Nucla	Colorado	Colorado Cooperative Company	1896	Decommmunalized, city remains extant	Established following the Panic of 1893. Originally called Piñon.
Equality Colony	Skagit County, Washington	Brotherhood of the Cooperative Commonwealth	1897	1907	Principles of the community were inspired by Edward Bellamy's utopian novel, Looking Backward (1886) and its sequel novel Equality (1897). In 1905 colony was divided by arrival of Alexander Horr and other adherents of Theodor Hertzka’s "Freeland" concept. Wave of arsons effectively ended the social experiment.
Bellamy Cooperative Colony	Lincoln County, Oregon (on the Depai Creek 4 miles north of the county seat of Lincoln)	Founded by Norwegian settlers	1897	unknown	Principles of the community were inspired by Edward Bellamy's utopian novel, Looking Backward (1886) and its sequel novel Equality (1897).
Freedom	Bourbon County, Kansas	G. B. De Bernardi	1897	1905	The colony's economy was based on a Labor Exchange, designed to eliminate poverty and want, through the creation of a “soft” currency that served as legal tender. At the colony's warehouse, workers exchanged goods for “labor checks” redeemable for items in the warehouse.

== Twentieth century ==
Name	Location	Founder	Founding date	Ending date	Notes
Arden Village	Delaware	Frank Stephens; William Lightfoot Price	1900	currently active	An art colony founded as a Georgist single-tax art community. Two nearby centres also ascribed to Georgist principles - Ardentown, founded in 1922, and Ardencroft, founded in 1950.
Zion, Illinois	Illinois	John Alexander Dowie	1900	1907	A Utopian Christian religious community, reorganized following fraud allegations and founder's death into modern city.
Equality Colony	Washington	Norman W. Lermond; Ed Pelton	1900	1907	One of the many U.S. socialist intentional communities inspired by Edward Bellamy's utopian novel, Looking Backward. These communities were often called Nationalist Clubs.
Freeland Association	Washington	Dissident members of the Equality Colony	1900	1906	A socialist commune. The first settlers dissident members of the nearby Equality Colony. While the Freeland Association dissolved in 1906 the census-designated place (CDP) of Freeland, Washington continues to exist.
Helicon Home Colony	New Jersey	Upton Sinclair (who had funds due to his successful book The Jungle)	1906	1907	A "co-operative home". A "home colony," in which to "secure the advantage of the application of machinery to domestic processes, and incidentally to solve the problem of the management of servants."
Post	Post, Texas	C.W. Post	1907	currently active	
Free Acres	New Jersey	Bolton Hall	1910	currently active	Georgist community
Llano del Rio	California	Job Harriman	1914	1918	Project designed by architect and planner Alice Constance Austin with strong emphasis on shared domestic work
New Llano	Louisiana	Job Harriman	1917	1937	Founded by Job Harriman & other members of the California Llano del Rio colony who relocated to Louisiana.
Holy City	California	William E. Riker	1919	1959	Founded by a sect that promoted celibacy, temperance and a segregationist interpretation of Christianity.
Jersey Homesteads	Roosevelt, New Jersey	President Franklin D. Roosevelt, Benjamin Brown	1936	1939	socialist Jewish farming community formed as part of F.D.R.'s New Deal. Its history is presented in a 1983 documentary Roosevelt, New Jersey: Visions of Utopia
Druid Heights	California	Elsa Gidlow; Isabel Quallo; Roger Somers	1954	1987	Bohemian and artistic community. A meeting place used by three U.S. countercultural movements—the Beat Generation of the 1950s, the hippie movement of the 1960s, and the women's movement of the 1970s.
Kerista Commune	New York ("Old Tribe"); San Francisco ("New Tribe")	John Peltz "Bro Jud" Presmont	1956 (Old Tribe); 1971 (New Tribe)	1991	Polyamorous new religious movement with communal ownership and a polyfidelitous nightly sleeping schedule.
Padanaram Settlement	Indiana	Daniel Wright	1966	largely privatized soon after the death of the founder in 2001 (communal businesses, school, dining hall, common purse were all discontinued)	Christian fundamentalist commune in rural Indiana
Twin Oaks	Virginia	Kat Kinkade, others	1967	currently active	Originally a behaviourist utopian society based on the novel Walden Two; eventually becoming an egalitarian commune.
The Farm	Lewis County, Tennessee	Stephen Gaskin	1971	currently active (became a co-op in 1983)	Buddhist-inspired Hippie vegetarian community. De-collectivized in 1983.
East Wind Community	Ozark County, Missouri	Kat Kinkade	1973	currently active	A secular and democratic community in which members hold all communities assets in common.
Uranian Phalanstery and the associated First New York Gnostic Lyceum Temple	Lower East Side of Manhattan, New York	Richard Oviet Tyler and Dorothea Baer	1974	currently active	follows the "Practice of the Eightfold Way on the Path" and exercise "Creativity in Practice of the Path". Fourierist.
Acorn Community Farm	Virginia	Ira Wallace	1993	currently active	egalitarian commune; branched off of Twin Oaks.

== See also ==
- List of Finnish utopian communities
- List of German utopian communities
- List of Fourierist Associations in the United States
- Federation of Egalitarian Communities
- Fourierism
- Icarians
- List of intentional communities
- List of Owenite communities in the United States
- Owenism
- Shakers
