= Ira Wallace =

American author

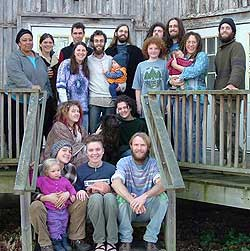
- Wallace, far-left, and other members of Acorn Community Farm, 2005
- Education: New College of Florida
- Occupation: Organic gardener
- Website: www.southernexposure.com

Ira Wallace is a gardener, teacher and author. She manages Southern Exposure Seed Exchange, a cooperatively-owned seed company.

Wallace played a role in the making of the 2014 film documentary Open Sesame – The Story of Seeds, an eye-opening account highlighting the obstacles that some of the most notable non-GMO seed proponents face in their quest to keep seeds from becoming sovereign property solely controlled by powerful entities. The film can be seen on Amazon Prime Video.

Wallace has served as a board member for the Virginia Association for Biological Farming, Open Source Seed Initiative and Organic Seed Alliance. She was the recipient of the 2016 Craig Claiborne Lifetime Achievement Award, the 2019 American Horticultural Society's Paul Ecke Jr. Commercial Award and the 2019 recipient of the Organic Growers School's Organic Educator Award.

== Early life ==
Wallace was raised in Tampa, Florida, by her grandmother Estella Brown. Her grandmother taught her how to raise chickens and how to grow a wide variety of edible plants in a large garden. At an early age, Wallace realized that she had a passion for gardening.

During the 1960s, she attended New College in Sarasota, Florida. (Her grandmother died the year she went to college.) A Southern Foodways Alliance article stated that "Wallace designed her own major and dug deep into the philosophy and practice of cooperative education and living." She left Florida after graduating from college, "traveled the world, exploring organic agriculture, seed saving, and cooperative living."

== Career ==
In The American Gardener, a publication of the American Horticultural Society, Wallace mentioned that she visited a Kibbutz in Israel, where she worked on a project that recreated an oasis in the desert. After her stay in Israel, she worked on farms while living in Denmark and Canada.

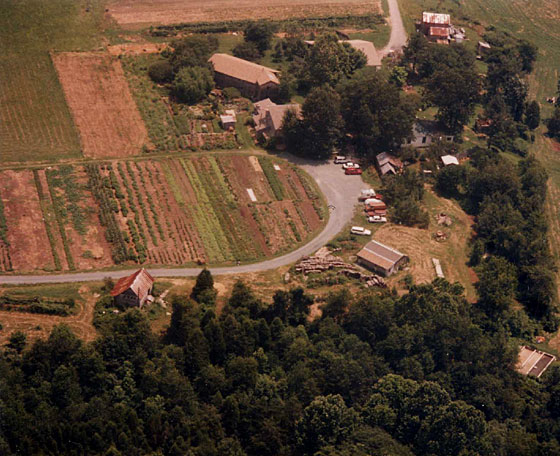
An aerial view of Twin Oaks’ main entrance and communal garden

In 1984, after returning to the U.S., she "‘moved to Twin Oaks, a cooperative community in Virginia.’"

An article published by West Virginia University stated that Wallace was the "mid-Atlantic regional correspondent for the Mother Earth News gardening almanac in the 1990s."

In 1993, she helped to found the Acorn Community, a farm-based, anarchist, egalitarian, intentional community located in rural Louisa County, Virginia.

In 1999, Wallace got involved with Southern Exposure Seed Exchange and ended up purchasing it after the original founders, Jeff McCormack and his wife Patty Wallens, decided to sell it.

Wallace is an organizer of the annual Monticello Heritage Harvest Festival. An article in the Charlottesville Tomorrow stated that she “set up the partnership between Southern Exposure and Monticello in 2007.” Wallace said in that same article that “‘the first Festival was a celebration of the growing interest in preserving our food heritage, and sustainable agriculture...I had a feeling that it mattered to a lot of people in our region.’”

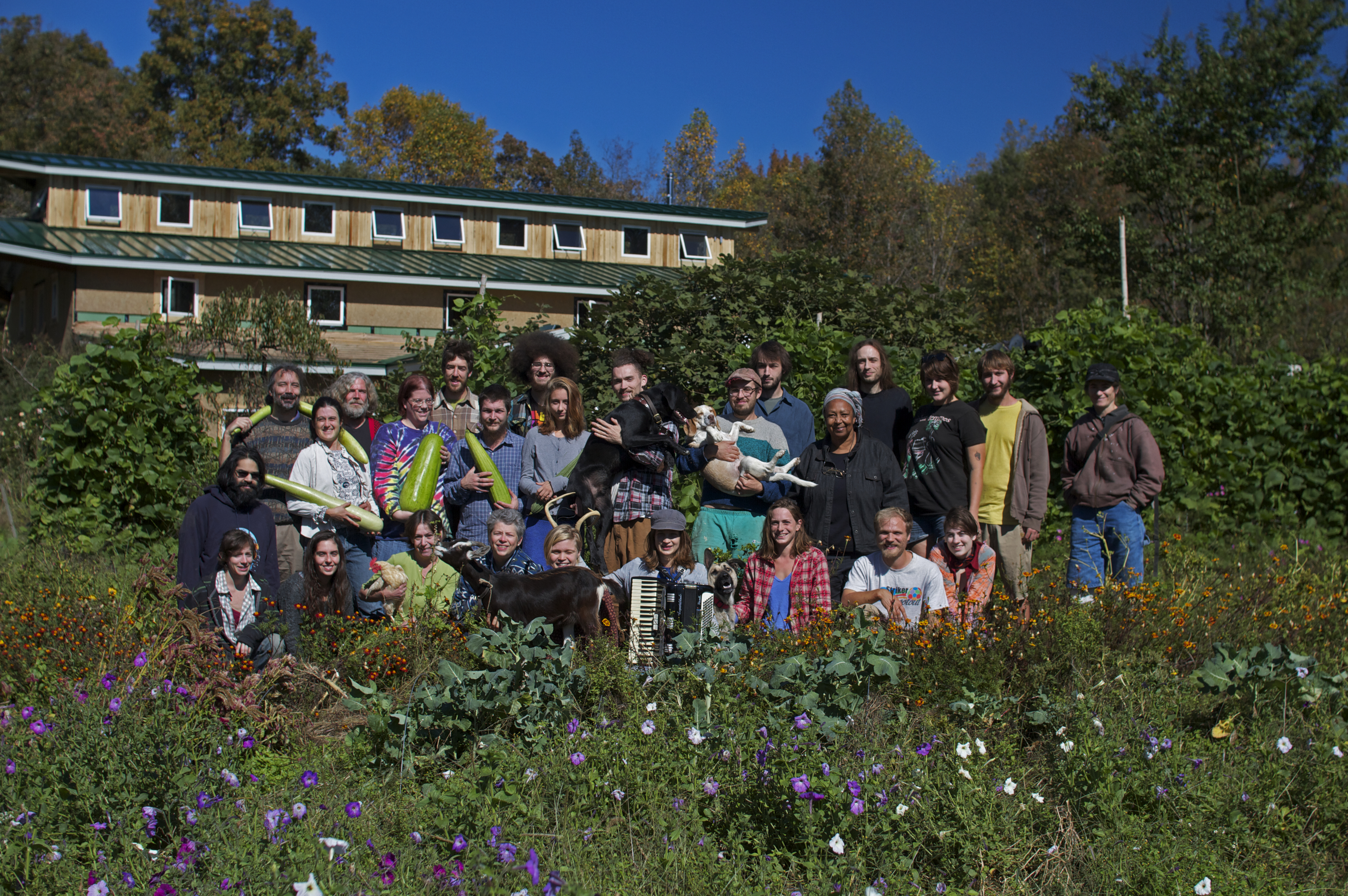
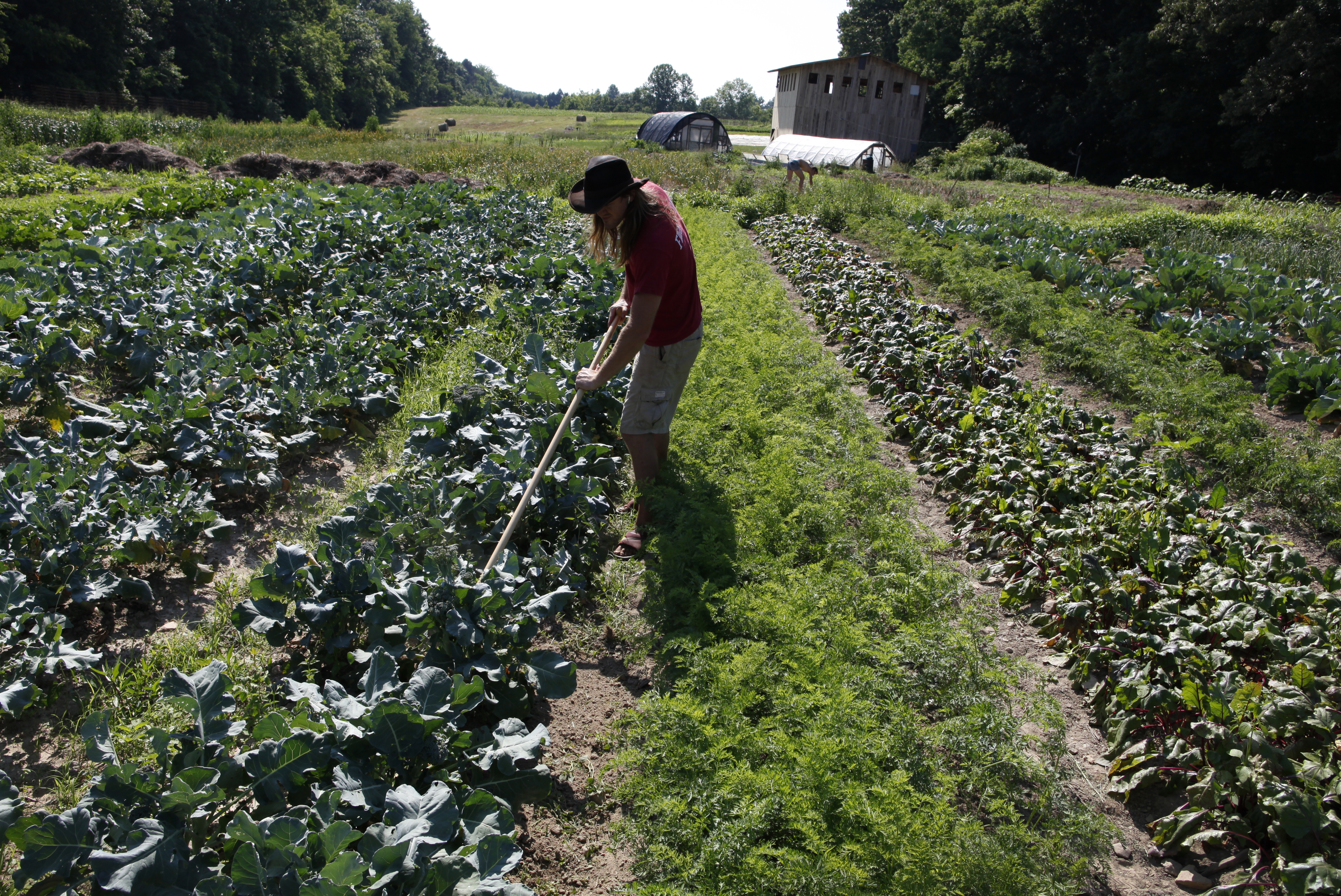
Acorn Community Farm in Louisa, Virginia. Wallace is standing just above and to the right of the woman wearing a red and white checkered shirt, 2013 (left). Four acres under cultivation in 2011 (right).

In a Virginia Tech Center for Food Systems and Community Transformation article, Wallace explained the importance of "nourishing ourselves, caring for history, and how care of the land and growing food is a noble profession."

Wallace uses her knowledge and experience to help educate, train and support the next generation of farmers, especially BIPOC farmers. Wallace has been involved in the Food Justice Movement, a grassroots initiative which emerged in response to food insecurity and economic pressures that prevent access to healthy, nutritious, and culturally appropriate foods. A Farmaid article stated that Wallace strongly believes "it is important to both pay farmworkers a living wage while also making good food accessible to everyone." She also works to educate individuals how to prepare those good foods.

In June 2023, Wallace won a James Beard Leadership Award, being recognized “for her impactful work and leadership as a writer, gardener, and educator...”
