= Southern Exposure =

Southern Exposure may refer to:

- Southern Exposure (album), a 1993 album by Maceo Parker
- Southern Exposure, a 2007 album by Bill Leverty
- Southern Exposure (art space), a San Francisco non-profit art space
- Southern Exposure (festival), a three-day event, held annually in Greenville, South Carolina
- Southern Exposure (film), a 1934 short film, a musical parody of Uncle Tom's Cabin
- Southern Exposure (magazine), a political and cultural magazine published by the Institute for Southern Studies
- Southern exposure (terminology)
- Southern Exposure Seed Exchange, a seed company specializing in heirloom varieties
- Daffy's Southern Exposure, a 1942 short film
