= Kat Kinkade =

American co-founder of Twin Oaks commune (1930–2008)

Kathleen Kinkade
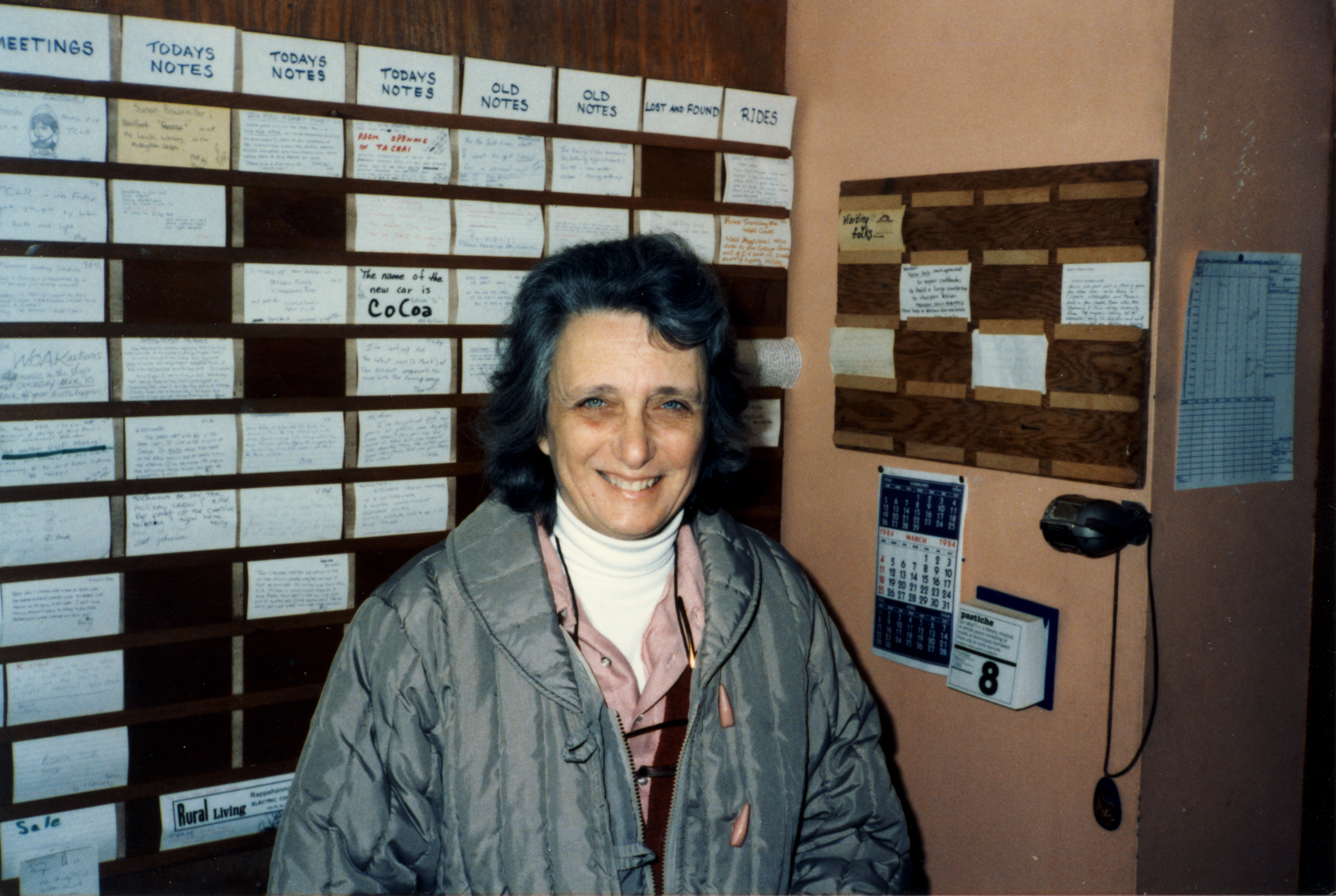
- Kat Kinkade at Twin Oaks Community in March 1984
- Born: December 6, 1930
- Died: July 3, 2008 (aged 77)
- Children: 1
- Writing career
- Literary movement: Commune movement of the 1960s and '70s

Kathleen "Kat" Kinkade (December 6, 1930 – July 3, 2008) was one of the eight co-founders of Twin Oaks, an intentional community in Virginia inspired by the behaviorist utopia depicted in B.F. Skinner's book Walden Two. Kinkade was the only founder to remain a community member for most of the community's history. Her daughter, Josie, was also a member of Twin Oaks as an adolescent and young adult.

== Career ==
A native of Seattle, Washington, Kinkade helped found Twin Oaks in 1967, when she was in her mid 30s, after a career as a "bored secretary" and a brief stint at a cooperative house in Washington, D.C. In the 1970s, Kinkade left Twin Oaks to move to Missouri to help found East Wind Community, an offshoot of Twin Oaks. She eventually returned to Twin Oaks, though East Wind continued. In 1993, Kinkade was also a co-founder of Acorn Community, her third income-sharing intentional community.

Kinkade was also instrumental in founding the network of income-sharing egalitarian communities called The Federation of Egalitarian Communities or the FEC.

At age 70, she moved into a small house fifteen miles away in the town of Mineral.

In 2008, with metastatic breast cancer, Kinkade was no longer able to care for herself. Twin Oaks took her in to provide end-of-life care, an exception made in honor of her unique contribution to the Community. Kinkade died of breast cancer complications on July 3, 2008, aged 77, shortly after Twin Oaks' 41st anniversary.

== Books ==
- A Walden Two Experiment; The First Five Years of Twin Oaks Community William Morrow & Co (February 1974) ISBN 0-688-05020-4
- Is It Utopia Yet?: An Insider's View of Twin Oaks Community in Its Twenty-Sixth Year Twin Oaks Publishing; 2nd edition (August 1994) ISBN 0-9640445-0-1
