= Octagon City, Kansas =

Ghost town in Allen County, Kansas

Coordinates: 37.7608°N 95.4230°W

Octagon City is a ghost town in Allen County, Kansas, United States. It was a failed intentional community that was founded in 1856 about six miles (10 km) south of Humboldt, Kansas, near the Neosho River. It was created by the Vegetarian Kansas Emigration Company, headed by prominent vegetarian Henry S. Clubb and entrepreneurs Charles DeWolfe and John McLaurin. The original intent was to build a utopian vegetarian commune on the south side of the Neosho River, but investor interest in a non-vegetarian moral community was much higher and the decision was made to build Octagon City on the north side of the Neosho River to make the entire project sustainable. Members of Octagon City were under oath to educate their children and uphold a stable life.

The city's design was influenced by Orson Squire Fowler, a leading advocate of octagon house architecture. Octagon City would feature an octagonal town square from which would radiate eight roads. Between the roads, in a four-square-mile area, 64 families were to build octagonal farmhouses with octagonal barns.

During May 1856, about 100 participating settlers arrived at the development site, expecting a blossoming town with grist mill and sawmill, but finding only one log cabin, one plow, and dozens of tents sheltering families. The site was very remote, and the nearest source of goods was in Fort Scott, Kansas, about 50 miles (80 km) away, so residents were forced to adapt and improvise. Mosquitoes, a flu-like epidemic ascribed to malnutrition, exhaustion, or malaria, the threat of border ruffians, and strong thunderstorms were a continuous problem. By early July, the springs feeding the community had dried up. Some residents chose to live at an Osage settlement a few miles away, which had a flowing spring, but they were forced to flee back to Octagon City upon learning that the tribe was about to return from its annual buffalo hunt. The summer months saw a continuous exodus of settlers, and the population quickly thinned. By August, crop theft by outsiders had become a major problem.

Very few of those who remained past summer intended to make permanent homes in Kansas. They soon left. By spring 1857, only four of the original residents were left, and they reported more illness as the weather became warmer again.

The area remained remote until 1873 when the railroad arrived. The town of Chanute, Kansas, sprang up four miles (6 km) south of the former commune. Nothing survives of the settlement except the name of nearby Vegetarian Creek. A marker erected near the site in 1986 was removed in 2001, due to repeated vandalism, and donated to the St. Paul/Neosho County Museum.

== See also ==
- List of ghost towns in Kansas
- List of American utopian communities
