= Orchid, Virginia =

Unincorporated community in Virginia, United States

- Unincorporated community
- Location within Virginia Location within the United States
- Coordinates: 37°49′45″N 77°53′43″W
- Country: United States
- State: Virginia
- County: Louisa
- Elevation: 338 ft (103 m)
- Time zone: UTC-5 (Eastern (EST))
  - Summer (DST): UTC-4 (EDT)
- Area code: 540
- GNIS feature ID: 1471945

Orchid is an unincorporated community in Louisa County, Virginia, United States.
