= Acorn Community Farm =

Community farm in rural Virginia, USA

Coordinates: 37.9144°N 77.9255°W

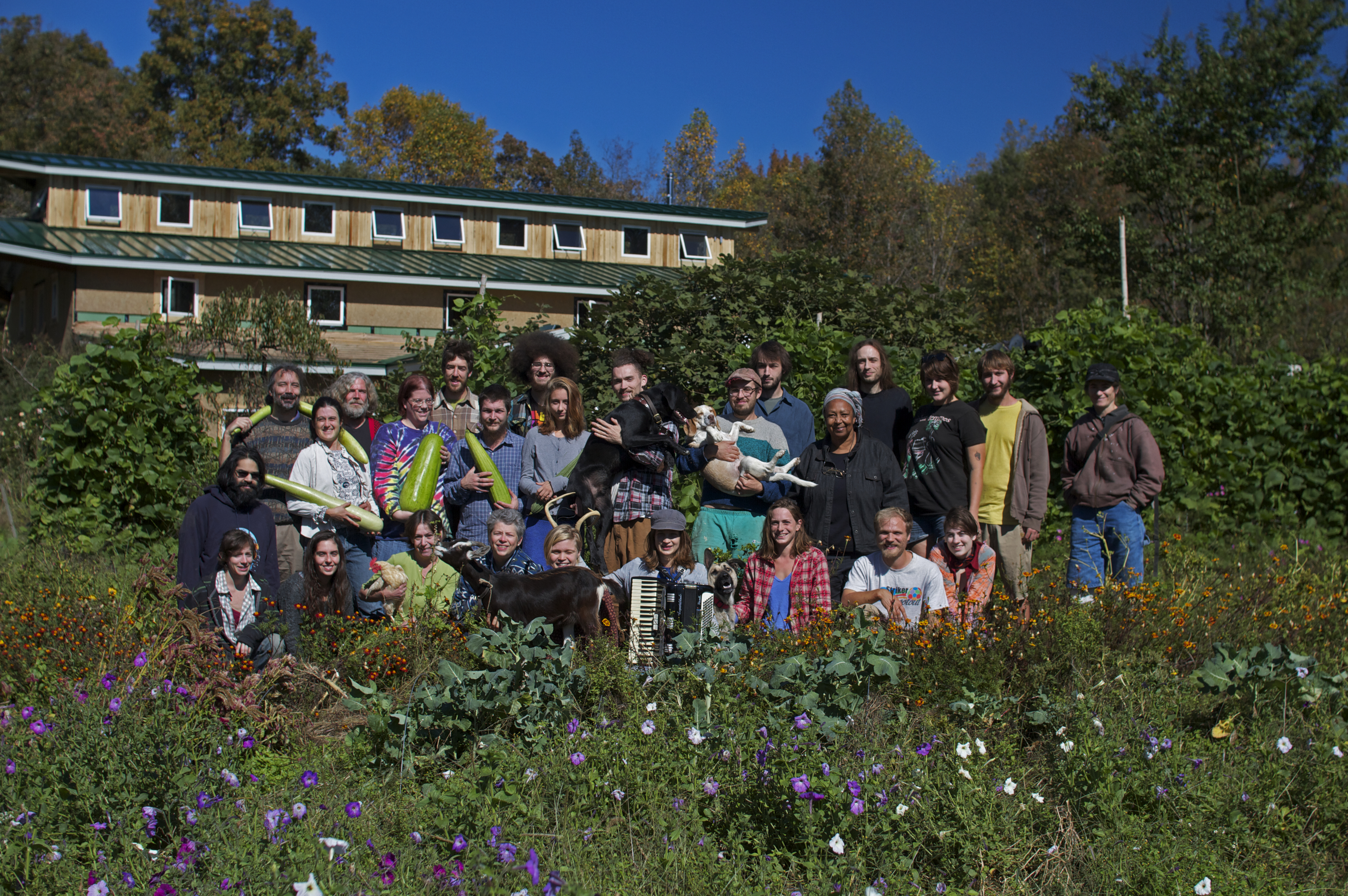
Acorn 2013

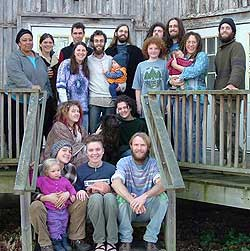
Acorn 2005

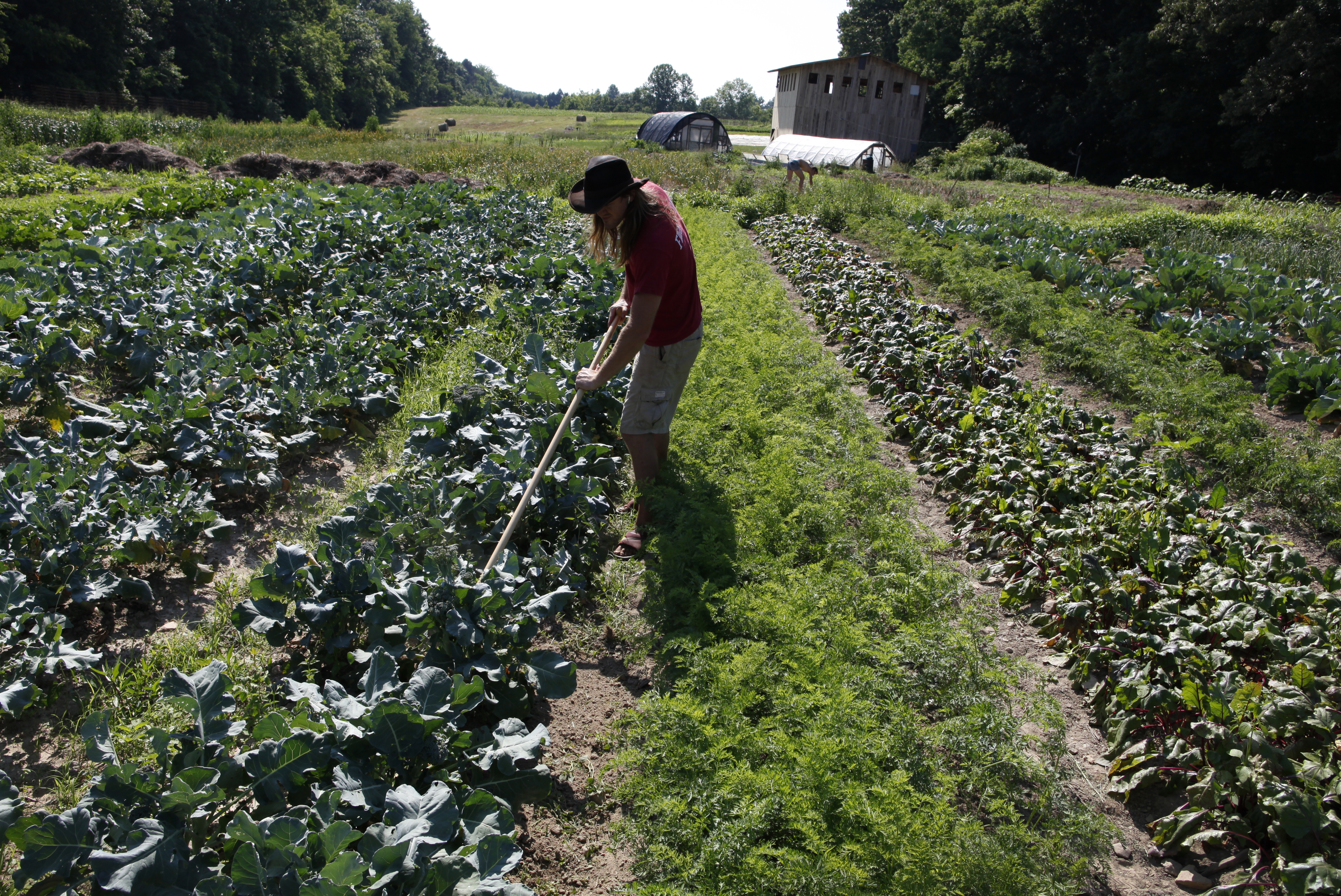
Four acres under cultivation in Acorn Farm

Acorn Community Farm is a farm-based intentional community located in rural Louisa County, Virginia, United States. Established in 1993, it is a member of the Federation of Egalitarian Communities, focusing on principles of anarchism and egalitarianism, and was created as a spin-off of the Twin Oaks Community.

In the early 1990s, Twin Oaks reached its full capacity, leading to increased demand from prospective members. To address this issue, Twin Oaks members founded Acorn on a 75-acre farm located approximately seven miles from Twin Oaks.

== Community ==
Group meetings at Acorn are held weekly with decisions made by consensus. The community sustains itself primarily through its business, Southern Exposure Seed Exchange. Acorn's population and organizational stability have fluctuated significantly throughout its history.

== Labor ==
Adult members of Acorn must work a minimum of 42 hours per week and are granted one month of vacation time a year. Members have the option to earn additional vacation time by working beyond the required hours.

All types of work are considered equally creditable, including traditional tasks such as office work, maintenance, and farming, as well as activities like child care, cooking, cleaning, and preparing for communal events.

== Monsanto lawsuit ==
Acorn, along with 82 other farmers and seed businesses, participated in a preemptive lawsuit against Monsanto to protect themselves from lawsuits related to genetically modified organism patent infringement. The case, Organic Seed Growers and Trade Association v. Monsanto, was a class-action suit litigated by the Public Patent Foundation, filed for the purpose of responding to Monsanto's purported actions against farmers whose fields had been contaminated with the company’s GMO seeds.

== Buildings ==
Members of Acorn participate in shared housing, with each person having a private bedroom within one of the four living structures.

In 2013, construction began on a new building intended to provide additional space for a seed farm. The building incorporates several features intended to be more environmentally friendly, including low-impact building materials, Southern exposure (terminology), passive ventilation for cooling, timber-frame construction, and desiccant air conditioning to maintain appropriate temperatures for seed storage. The building was estimated for completion in Fall 2014.

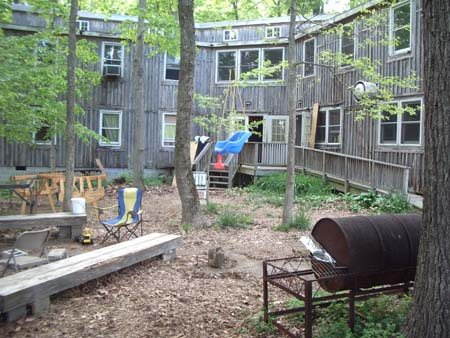
Heart Wood: A 13 bedroom custom built community house.

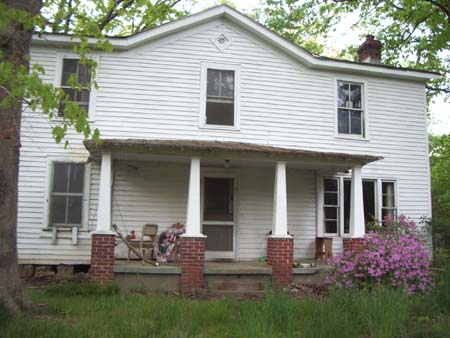
The Farm House: A 5 bedroom traditional clapboard house built in 1908.
