= Walden Two =

1948 novel by B. F. Skinner

- First edition
- Author: B. F. Skinner
- Language: English
- Genre: Science fiction, utopian novel
- Publisher: Hackett Publishing Company
- Publication date: 1948
- Publication place: United States
- Media type: Print
- Pages: 301
- ISBN: 0-87220-779-X
- OCLC: 75310838

Walden Two is a utopian novel written by behavioral psychologist B. F. Skinner, first published in 1948. At that time, it was considered as science fiction since science-based methods for altering human behavior were not widespread. Such methods are now known as applied behavior analysis. In this book B. F. Skinner is essentially putting forward his ideas as applied to practical everyday and communal problems, for instance how to raise children, balance work and life, or help people have happy and meaningful lives.

The book is controversial because its characters speak of a rejection of free will, including a rejection of the proposition that human behavior is controlled by a non-corporeal entity, such as a spirit or a soul. It embraces the proposition that the behavior of organisms, including humans, is determined by environmental variables, and that systematically altering environmental variables can generate a sociocultural system that very closely approximates utopia.

== Summary ==
The first-person narrator and protagonist, Professor Burris, a university instructor of psychology, is approached by two young men (one a former student) in the late 1940s. The young men are recent veterans of World War II and, intrigued by utopianism, express interest in an old acquaintance of Burris, named T. E. Frazier, who in the 1930s founded an intentional community. Burris contacts Frazier, who invites them all to stay for several days to experience life in the supposedly utopian community. Venturing to the community, named Walden Two, the young men bring their girlfriends, and Professor Burris brings along his colleague Professor Castle, who teaches philosophy and ethics.

The rest of the book proceeds largely as a novel of ideas, mostly involving Frazier, a smug, talkative, and colorful character, guiding his new visitors around Walden Two and proudly explaining its socio-politico-economic structures and collectivist achievements. A wide range of intellectual topics—behavioral modification, political ethics, educational philosophy, sexual equality (specifically, advocacy for women in the workforce), the common good, historiography, freedom and free will, fascism, American democracy, and Soviet communism—is discussed and often debated among the self-satisfied Frazier, the skeptical and doubting Castle, and the quietly intrigued Burris.

Walden Two operates using a flexible design, by continually experimenting with the most successful, evidence-based strategies to organize the community. Praising Walden Two's decision-making system for not being authoritarian, anarchic, or even democratic, Frazier argues that Walden Two thus avoids the way that most societies collapse or grow dysfunctional: by remaining dogmatically rigid in their politics and social structure. Except for a small fluctuating group of community Planners (temporarily including Frazier), Walden Two has no real governing body or power to exercise violent force over its citizens. Each member is apparently self-motivated, with a relaxed work schedule of only four hours of work a day, on average. Any labor performed supports the common good and is accompanied by the freedom to select a fresh new place to work each day. Members then use their remaining free time to engage in creative, intellectual, or recreational activities of their own choosing, while automatically receiving ample food and sleep. The only currency is a simple system of points that buys greater leisure periods in exchange for less desirable forms of work. Certain radically unusual customs of Walden Two include: children raised communally, families being non-nuclear, free love, and personal expressions of thanks regarded as taboo. Such behavior is mandated by the community's individually self-enforced "Walden Code", a guideline that encourages members to credit all individual and other achievements to the larger community. Community counselors are also available to assist with better understanding and following the Code. A rigorous program of "behavioral engineering" is begun at birth and completed during childhood, yet the adults of Walden Two indeed appear to be legitimately peaceful, productive, happy, well-rounded, and self-directed people.

Excitedly, two of the young visitors sign up and are soon admitted as permanent members. Castle, though, has fostered a growing hunch that Frazier is somehow presenting a sham society or is in fact, secretly, a dictator. Defending the virtues of American-style democracy, he finally confronts Frazier directly, accusing him of despotism, though he has no definitive proof. Frazier rebuts, on the contrary, that the vision for Walden Two is as a place safe from all forms of despotism, even the "despotism of democracy". Frazier and Burris have pleasant talks in private, with Frazier revealing that other communities loosely associated with Walden Two have now cropped up. Although enticed by Walden Two's obvious success as a peaceful community, Burris finds it difficult to look past Frazier's irritating pride and boastfulness about the community. Frazier admits his pride but argues that his personality should not influence Burris's opinion of Walden Two and Burris's own observations. By the end of their stay, the remaining visitors leave the community in a mostly impressed state of wonder, except for Castle, who has stubbornly settled on the idea that, somehow, Frazier is a scoundrel and the community is fraudulent.

During the visitors' return to the university, Burris ultimately decides in an inspired moment that he wishes to embrace the Walden Two lifestyle. Quickly abandoning his professorial post, Burris travels back in a long and spiritual journey on foot; he is welcomed once again to Walden Two with open arms.

== The community ==
The novel describes "an experimental community called Walden Two". The community is located in a rural area and "has nearly a thousand members". The community encourages its members "to view every habit and custom with an eye to possible improvement" and to have "a constantly experimental attitude toward everything". The culture of Walden Two can be changed if experimental evidence favors proposed changes. The community emulates (on a communal scale) the simple living and self-sufficiency that Henry David Thoreau practiced (on an individual scale) at Walden Pond, as described in his 1854 book Walden. Walden Two engages in behavioral engineering of young children that aims toward cooperative relationships and the erasure of competitive sentiments. The community has also dissolved the nuclear family through placing the responsibility of child-rearing in the hands of the larger community and not just the child's parents or immediate family.

== Community governance ==
Walden Two consists of four loose classes or groupings of people by occupation (though they are not akin to strict economic classes): Planners, Managers, Workers, and Scientists. Walden Two has a constitution that provides for a "Board of Planners", which is Walden Two's "only government", though the power they wield only amounts to that, approximately, of community organizers. The idea for the "Board of Planners" was conceived while Walden Two was still in its earliest theoretical stages, and there are "six Planners, usually three men and three women", who are "charged with the success of the community. They make policies, review the work of the Managers (heads of each area of labor), keep an eye on the state of the nation in general. They also have certain judicial functions." A Planner "may serve for ten years, but no longer." A vacancy on the Board of Planners is filled by the Board "from a pair of names supplied by the Managers". Furthermore, the Walden Two constitution "can be changed by a unanimous vote of the Planners and a two-thirds vote of the Managers".

Frazier and five other people constitute the current Board of Planners during Burris's visit to Walden Two. Planners hold office in staggered, limited terms. They do not rule with any kind of force and are so extremely opposed to creating a cult of personality, system of favoritism, or other possibilities for corruption going against the common good that they do not even publicly announce their office, and, likewise, most of the community members do not bother to know the Planners' identities. Due to this and also as a result of this, the Planners live as modestly as the other members of the community; ostentatious displays of wealth and status simply have no opportunity to arise from Walden Two's egalitarian cultural structure.

Managers, meanwhile, are "specialists in charge of the divisions and services of Walden Two". A member of the community can "work up to be a Manager – through intermediate positions which carry a good deal of responsibility and provide the necessary apprenticeship". The Managers are not elected by the members of Walden Two in any kind of democratic process. The method of selecting Managers is not specified, though they are likely appointed by the Board of Planners.

The regular community members are known (though only for official reasons) as Workers, and they have the flexible option of changing their field and location of employment every single day, so as not to grow bored or stagnant during the week with their four-on-average daily hours of work. Available work often includes the necessary physical labor that goes into maintaining a community, such as basic building or repairing projects, cleaning duties, or agricultural work. Labor in Walden Two operates using a simple point system of units called "credits", in which more menial or unpleasant jobs (such as waste management) earn a Worker a higher number of credits than more relaxing or interesting jobs, ultimately allowing more free time for that Worker.

The final grouping within Walden Two is the Scientists, who conduct experiments "in plant and animal breeding, the control of infant behavior, educational processes of several sorts, and the use of some of [Walden Two's] raw materials". Scientists are the least discussed group in the novel; little is said about the selection, total number, specific duties, or methods of the Scientists, though they presumably carry out the ongoing social experiments that help determine the most beneficial social strategies for the community.

== Thoreau's Walden ==
Walden Two's title is a direct reference to Henry David Thoreau's book Walden. In the novel, the Walden Two Community is mentioned as having the benefits of living in a place like Thoreau's Walden, but "with company". It is, as the book says, 'Walden for two'—meaning a place for achieving personal self-actualization, but within a vibrant community, rather than in a place of solitude. Originally, Skinner indicated that he wanted to title it The Sun is but a Morning Star, a quote of the last sentence of Thoreau's Walden, but the publishers suggested the current title as an alternative.

In theory and in practice Thoreau's Walden Pond experiment and the fictive Walden Two experiment were very different from each other. For instance Thoreau's book Walden espouses the virtues of self-reliance at the individual level, whilst Walden Two espouses

1. the virtues of self-reliance at the community level, and
2. Skinner's underlying premise that free will of the individual is weak compared with how environmental conditions shape behavior.

The cover of some editions of Walden Two shows the 'O' filled with yellow ink, with yellow lines radiating from the center of the 'O'. That Sun-like 'O' is an allusion to the proposition that The sun is but a morning star.

== News From Nowhere, 1984 ==
Skinner published a follow-up to Walden Two in an essay titled "News From Nowhere, 1984". It details the discovery of Eric Blair in the community who seeks out and meets Burris, confessing his true identity as George Orwell. Blair seeks out Frazier as the 'leader' and the two have discussions which comprise the essay. Blair was impressed by Walden Two's "lack of any institutionalized government, religion, or economic system", a state of affairs that embodied "the dream of nineteenth-century anarchism".

== Real-world efforts ==
Many efforts to create a Walden Two in real life are detailed in Hilke Kuhlmann's Living Walden Two and in Daniel W. Bjork's B.F. Skinner.

Some of these efforts include:

- 1953: In Lincoln, Massachusetts, a group of families from the MIT community, led by Ranulf (Rany) Gras and his wife Ann and inspired by Skinner's book, formed a corporation and built 23 homes on a 40-acre (16 ha) lot in what became known as the Brown's Wood neighborhood.
- 1955: In New Haven, Connecticut, a group led by Arthur Gladstone tried to start a community.
- 1966: The Waldenwoods conference was held in Hartland, Michigan, comprising 83 adults and 4 children, coordinated through the Breiland list (a list of interested people who wrote to Skinner and were referred to Jim Breiland).
- 1966: Matthew Israel formed the Association for Social Design (ASD), to promote a Walden Two, which soon found chapters in Los Angeles, Albuquerque, and Washington, D.C.
- 1967: Matthew Israel founded the Morningside House in Arlington, Massachusetts. When it failed, he tried a second time. Israel later went on to found the Judge Rotenberg Center, which has been condemned by the United Nations for the torture of children with disabilities.
- 1967: The Twin Oaks Community was started in Louisa County, Virginia.
- 1969: Keith Miller in Lawrence, Kansas, founded a 'Walden house' student collective that became the Sunflower House 11.
- 1970: Walden 7, a 1,000-inhabitant community west of Barcelona (Spain), was created as a social and architectural experiment based on Walden Two, living in a building designed by Catalan architect Ricardo Bofill.
- 1971: Roger Ulrich started "an experimental community named Lake Village in Kalamazoo, Michigan."
- 1971: Los Horcones was started in Hermosillo, Mexico.
- 1971: Mary Louise Strum and David Nord started an experimental Jewish faith-based commune named "Jubilee Community" in Westphalia, Texas, based on Skinner's Walden Two utopian ideals.
- 1972: Sunflower House 11 was (re)born in Lawrence, Kansas, from the previous experiment.
- 1973: East Wind was started in south-central Missouri.

Twin Oaks is detailed in Kat Kinkade's book, A Walden Two experiment: The first five years of Twin Oaks Community. Originally started as a Walden Two community, it has since rejected its Walden Two position, however it still uses its modified Planner-Manager system as well as a system of labor credits based on the book.

Los Horcones does not use the Planner-Manager governance system described in Walden Two. They refer to their governance system as a "personocracy". This system has been "developed through ongoing experimentation". In contrast to Twin Oaks, Los Horcones "has remained strongly committed to an experimental science of human behavior and has described itself as the only true Walden Two community in existence." In 1989, B. F. Skinner said that Los Horcones "comes closest to the idea of the 'engineered utopia' that he put forth in Walden Two".

== Cultural engineering ==
Skinner wrote about cultural engineering in at least two books, devoting a chapter to it in both Science and Human Behavior and Beyond Freedom and Dignity. In Science and Human Behavior a chapter is titled "Designing a Culture" and expands on this position as well as in other documents. In Beyond Freedom and Dignity there are many indirect references to Walden Two when describing other cultural designs.

== Criticisms ==
Hilke Kuhlmann's Living Walden Two possesses many subtle and not-so-subtle criticisms of the original Walden Two which are related to the actual efforts that arose from the novel. One criticism is that many of the founders of real-life Walden Twos identified with, or wanted to emulate, Frazier, the uncharismatic and implicitly despotic founder of the community.

In a critique of Walden Two, Harvey L. Gamble, Jr. asserted that Skinner's "fundamental thesis is that individual traits are shaped from above, by social forces that create the environment", and that Skinner's goal "is to create a frictionless society where individuals are properly socialized to function with others as a unit", and to thus "make the community [Walden Two] into a perfectly efficient anthill". Gamble writes, "We find at the end of Walden Two that Frazier [a founding member of Walden Two]... has sole control over the political system and its policies. It is he who regulates food, work, education, and sleep, and who sets the moral and economic agenda."

There are several varieties of behaviorism, but only Skinner's radical behaviorism has proposed to redesign society. The relevant principles were expounded at length two decades later in Beyond Freedom and Dignity.

Walden Two was criticized in John Staddon's The New Behaviorism. Skinner thought Walden Two an accomplishment comparable to two science-fiction classics: Aldous Huxley's Brave New World (1931) and George Orwell's Nineteen Eighty-Four (1949). He assigned all three in his Nat Sci 114 introductory psychology course at Harvard. There is some irony in Skinner's choice, because Orwell's and Huxley's novels are both dystopias. They portray not the supposed benefits of a technological approach to human society, but the evil consequences of either overtly ruthless (Nineteen Eighty-Four) or quietly manipulative (Brave New World) efforts to control human beings and deny individuality. On the contrary, Walden Two is supposed to light the technological path to utopia.

Skinner's Walden proposal is in a tradition that goes back to Plato's philosopher kings: a small set of guardians trained to be wiser than the common people. The guardians "are to be a class apart, like the Jesuits in old Paraguay, the ecclesiastics in the States of the Church until 1870 and the Communist Party in the U.S.S.R. at the present day," wrote Bertrand Russell, one of Skinner's heroes, in 1946. Despite Walden Two's eschewing of any specialist roles, Skinner was quite explicit about the need for technocratic rule in real life: "We must delegate control of the population as a whole to specialists – to police, priests, teachers, therapies, and so on, with their specialized reinforcers and their codified contingencies".

== Publication details ==
- ISBN 0-87220-779-X (Hardcover) (Worldcat link)
- ISBN 0-87220-778-1 (Paperback) (Worldcat link)
- ISBN 0-02-411510-X (Mass market paperback) (Worldcat link)

== See also ==
- Behaviorism
- New Atlantis
- Scientocracy
- Positive psychology
- Experimental analysis of behavior
