= Kaweah Colony =

Former utopian community in California, United States

Coordinates: 36°28′11″N 118°55′06″W

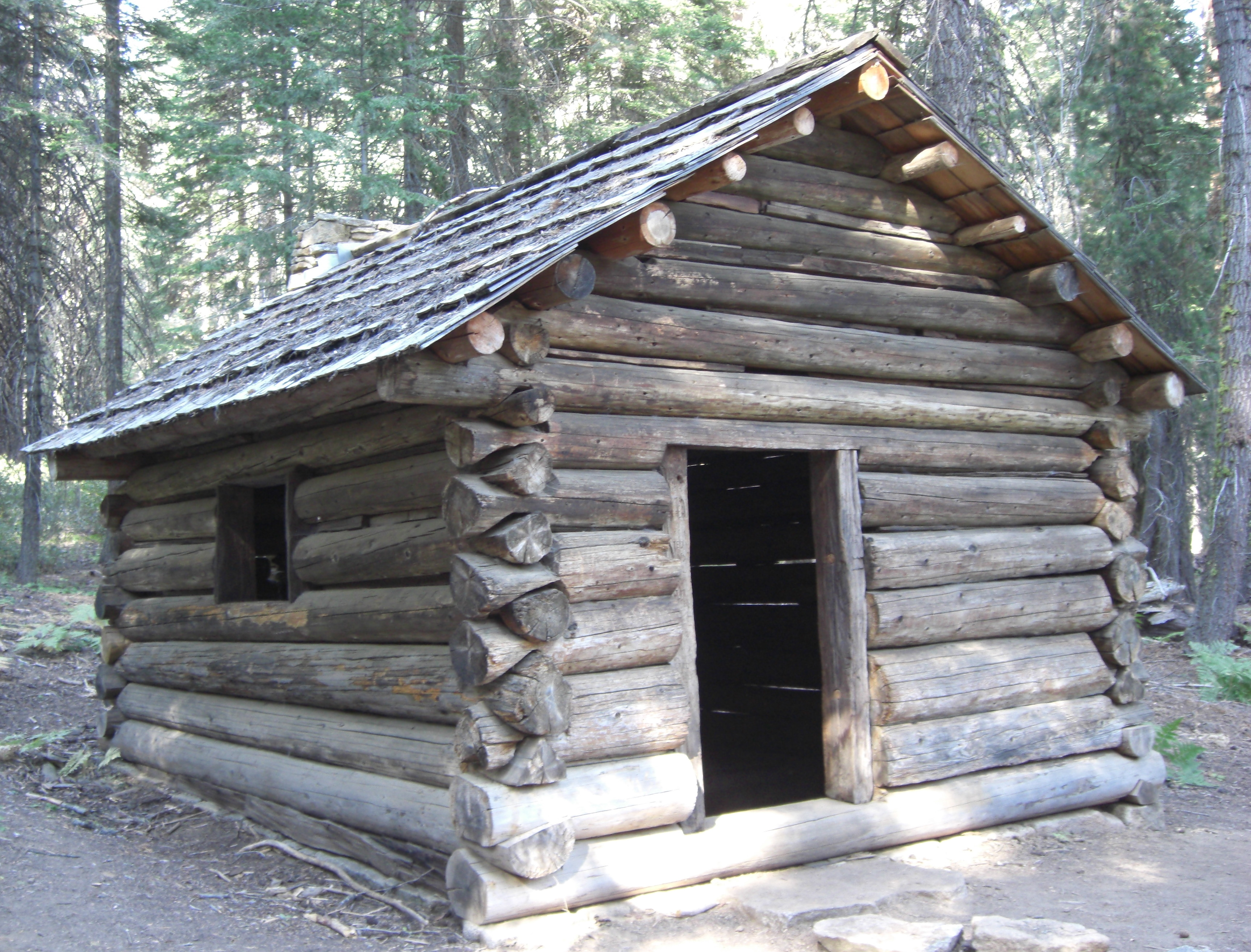
Squatter's Cabin

The Kaweah Colony was a utopian socialist community in central California founded in October 1885, with a name meaning "here we rest." Located in the Sierra Nevada range, they lived near groves of giant sequoia trees. The establishment of Sequoia National Park in 1890 contributed to the colony's demise. The colony was formally disbanded in January 1892.

== History ==
=== Establishment ===
As early as 1884, inspired by a new book by Laurence Gronlund, The Cooperative Commonwealth, a number of residents of California decided to form a cooperative colony and began to search for a suitable site. After reviewing several locations, a rugged area in Tulare County was decided upon, and in October 1885 there were filed 45 claims under the Timber Act of 1878 for land located along the Kaweah River. Terms of the act provided for a 60 day probationary period, with the commissioner of public lands ordering a suspension of claims before the expiration of this period as he suspected the claimants to be fronts for a large timber corporation rather than the actual settlers required under the law.

Laurence Gronlund's 1884 book, The Cooperative Commonwealth, was the inspiration for launch of the Kaweah Colony.

The settlers believed their rejection to be a temporary delay and set about demonstrating their intent to settle the land, going to work to open the claimed land with an 18-mile road through mountainous terrain previously deemed inaccessible by timber companies.

On March 9, 1888, the colony was legally established through the Deed of Settlement and Bylaws of Kaweah Colony. This colony based its economy on logging. Membership cost $500 with $100 payable upon application and the remainder in installments of cash or labor. Estimated nationwide membership peaked at 300-500 individuals, many of whom were non-resident supporters. The resident population at its height was around 150. The colony published the local area's first newspaper, the Kaweah Commonwealth.

Kaweah Colony was noteworthy for its exploitation of giant sequoia groves. The tree now known as the General Sherman Tree was previously named the Karl Marx tree by the colonists. The only remaining structure from the group's tenure at Sequoia is the Squatter's Cabin, now listed on the National Register of Historic Places.

=== Demise and legacy ===
On October 1, 1890, in the closing hours of a session of Congress, a bill was passed reserving land for the Yosemite National Park, California's second national park and only the third in the United States, which included an expansion of Sequoia National Park into the land that Kaweah colonists had claimed and improved over the previous five years. A February 1891 report by Land Commissioner Lewis A. Groff supported the colonists' claim that they had followed the law as written, but this was rejected by Secretary of the Interior John Willock Noble, who ruled that since the land claims were not legally perfected, the land remained in the hands of Congress to use as it saw fit.

The colonists were sued for the illegal logging of public lands. While offering the defense that their land claims had been legal and that final approval had been only suspended pending confirmation that they were actual settlers, this argument did not prevail. On April 16, 1891, a US District Court in Los Angeles court rejected the colonists' claims of legitimate possession and returned a conviction. Efforts were made to fine the colonists for the illegal harvest of five trees and the matter returned to the courts on appeal.

This legal wrangling proved to be the colony's undoing. In January 1892, the Kaweah Cooperative Colony company was officially dissolved. For more than four decades thereafter some colonists attempted to gain government compensation for the loss of their logging claims under eminent domain law, but these pleas were also not successful.

Kaweah lives on in name at Twin Oaks Community, a contemporary intentional community of 100 members in Virginia. All Twin Oaks' buildings are named after communities that no longer exist, and "Kaweah" is the name of the largest and most eco-featured residence.

== See also ==
- Burnette Haskell
- C.C. Curtis
