= Living Energy Farm =

Intentional community in Virginia, US

Coordinates: 37°55′59.05″N 77°59′38.91″W

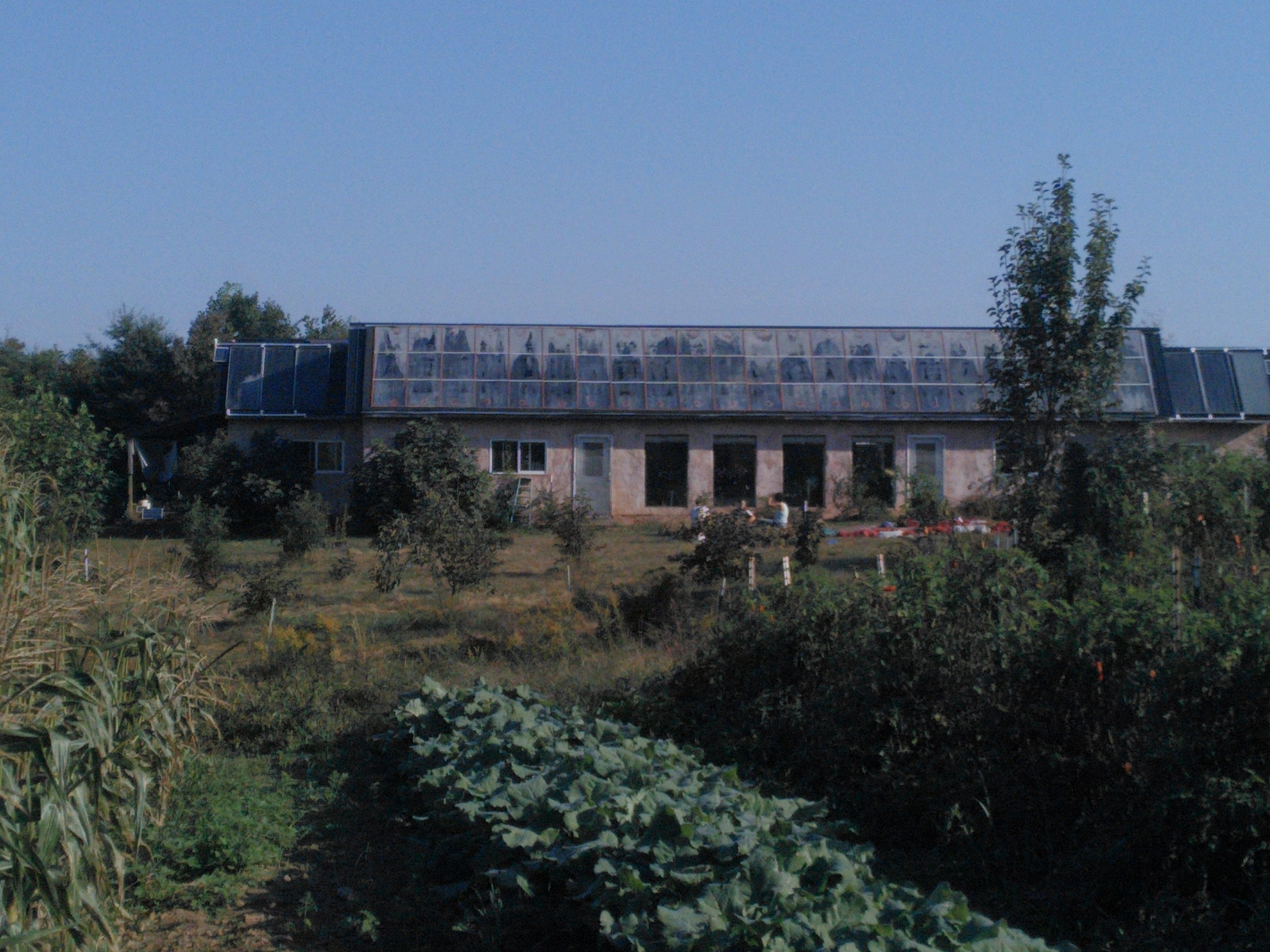
Energy Independent Home at Living Energy Farm

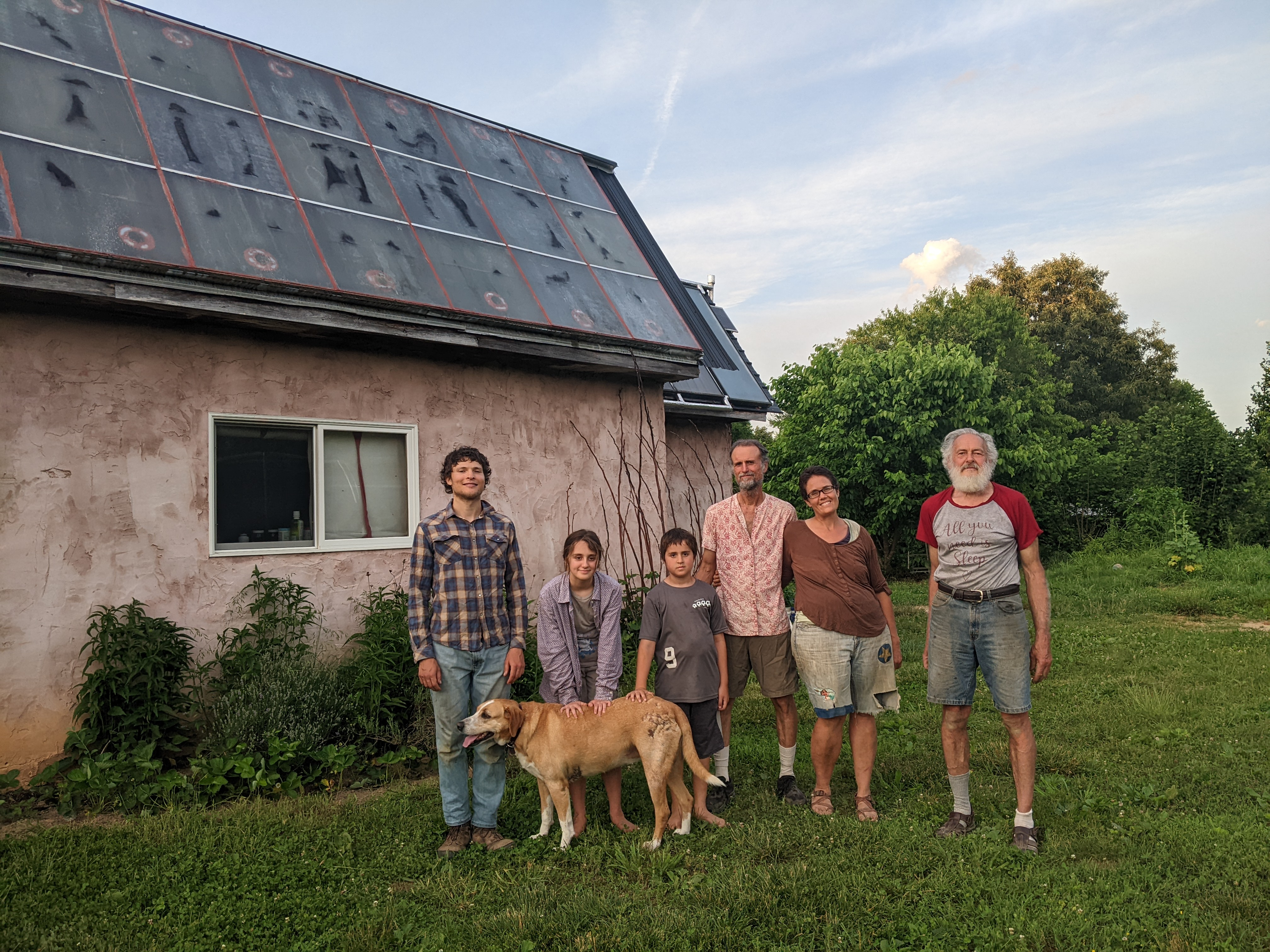
The folks who live at Living Energy Farm.

Living Energy Farm, or "LEF", is an intentional community of eight adult members and four children (as of 2024) on 127 acres in rural Louisa County, Virginia, United States. LEF has pioneered an energy conservationist design that allows its members to live a comfortable modern lifestyle powered with only a modest supply of renewable energy consisting of about 250 watts of solar electricity per person, biogas, and solar thermal features. LEF does not use grid electricity, generators, natural gas, propane, or any substantial amount of firewood.

== Community ==
LEF is an intentional community, organic farm and environmental educational center founded in 2010. The community is off the grid and grows most of its food. The membership supports itself financially by growing seeds for Southern Exposure Seed Exchange and other seed companies.

As an environmental education center, LEF's mission is to demonstrate a way of life that is both sustainable and accessible to the majority of humanity that is not wealthy. To that end, LEF has developed a solar powered DC Microgrid that supplies basic domestic energy needs at a fraction of the cost of typical AC based off-grid solar systems.

In 2020 LEF launched a business, Living Energy Lights, which sells daylight drive appliances and battery systems.

In addition to its pioneering work on DC energy systems, LEF employs many other "green" technologies such as strawbale insulation, passive and active solar heating, and biogas production for cooking fuel and farm tractors.

== DC Microgrid ==
The DC Microgrid developed at LEF uses direct/ daylight drive (wiring DC motors and other appliances directly to PV panels), thermal storage, and insulation to provide off-grid domestic energy services at low cost by avoiding the use of batteries and inverters for heavy energy loads such as refrigeration, cooking, heating and cooling, and motors. Power for lights and smaller loads like electronics are provided by 12V DC nickel iron battery systems.

The community has been central to the development and testing of Insulated Solar Electric Cookers in cooperation with Cal Poly University.

== Outreach ==
LEF works to promote and establish daylight drive DC Microgrids in low income communities where grid power is inaccessible or unreliable. LEF has established solar energy programs the Dine and Hopi Reservations, on two sites in Jamaica (The Source Farm and Ecovillage and Solidarity Yaad), as well as numerous community centers and farms in Puerto Rico.
