= Blue Ridge Shores, Virginia =

Census-designated place in Louisa County, Virginia

- Census-designated place
- Location within Virginia Location within the United States
- Coordinates: 38°6′30″N 78°1′15″W
- Country: United States
- State: Virginia
- County: Louisa

Area
  - Total: 1.80 sq mi (4.67 km^{2})
  - Land: 1.37 sq mi (3.55 km^{2})
  - Water: 0.43 sq mi (1.12 km^{2})
- Elevation: 310 ft (94 m)

Population (2020)
  - Total: 801
  - Density: 590/sq mi (229/km^{2})
- Time zone: UTC−5 (Eastern (EST))
  - Summer (DST): UTC−4 (EDT)
- ZIP code: 23093 (Louisa)
- FIPS code: 51-08264
- GNIS feature ID: 2630622

Blue Ridge Shores is a census-designated place (CDP) in Louisa County, Virginia, United States. The population as of the 2020 census was 801. It was built beginning in 1960 as a resort community around Lake Louisa.

== Geography ==
Blue Ridge Shores is in northern Louisa County, in the Piedmont region of Virginia. It is 8 miles (13 km) north of Louisa, the county seat, 30 miles (48 km) east of Charlottesville, and 63 miles (101 km) northwest of Richmond.

According to the U.S. Census Bureau, the CDP has a total area of 1.8 square miles (4.7 km^{2}), of which 1.4 square miles (3.6 km^{2}) are land and 0.4 square miles (1.1 km^{2}), or 23.90%, are water. Lake Louisa, a reservoir built on Hickory Creek, is in the center of the community. Hickory Creek flows northeast to the North Anna River and is part of the Pamunkey River watershed, leading to the tidal York River and Chesapeake Bay.

== Demographics ==
Historical population
Census	Pop.	Note	%±
2010	813		—
2020	801		−1.5%
U.S. Decennial Census; 2010 2020

Blue Ridge Shores was first listed as a census designated place in the 2010 U.S. census.
