= Burnette Haskell =

American radical

- Portrait by Louis Thors, December 1880
- Born: June 11, 1857; Sierra County, California, U.S.
- Died: November 16, 1907 (aged 50); San Francisco, California, U.S.
- Known for: Kaweah Co-operative Commonwealth
- Political party: Republican (before 1879, after 1896); Socialist Labor (1886); Labor (1886); Democratic (1890); Populist (1892–1896)

Burnette Gregor Haskell (June 11, 1857 – November 16, 1907) was an American radical best known for co-founding the Kaweah Co-operative Commonwealth. He was also involved in anarchist and labor causes.

== Life ==
Haskell (left) and J.J. Callahan, third and second editors respectively of the Enquirer, May 15, 1887

Burnette Haskell was born in Sierra County, California, in 1857. He attended Oberlin College, the University of Illinois Urbana-Champaign, and the University of California. Haskell was admitted to the State Bar of California in 1879 and worked with the California Republican State Committee before turning to labor organizing. He worked on The Truth, which was associated with the San Francisco Trade Assembly. Haskell frequently changed his political leanings, leading to his reputation in the labor movement as "brilliant but erratic".

Inspired by Laurence Gronlund's 1884 Co-operative Commonwealth, he organized the Cooperative land Purchase and Colonization Association of California with James Martin the next year. The group was closely connected with the anarchists, socialists, and unionists of the San Francisco International Workingmen's Association. Haskell and Martin led 53 colonists to found the Kaweah Co-operative Commonwealth in the Sierra forest (now Sequoia National Park) of Tulare County, California, in 1885. The group supported itself through timber harvesting and grew to 150 colonists. Socialist Gerald Geraldson and Gronlund supplied outside financial aid as well. The colony dissolved in January 1892 between a government land suit, colonist factionalism, and difficulties with Haskell's personality. Other sources claim that the Southern Pacific Railroad colluded with politicians to seize the colony's land. Eminent domain was used in 1890 to turn the colony's land into part of Sequoia National Park.

In 1886, while serving as editor of the Denver Labor Enquirer, Haskell tried to become Western director of the Socialist Labor Party, but was rejected. Later that year, he was a founding member of the San Francisco Labor Party and served on its executive committee. He was later active in the Democratic and Populist Parties (running as the latter party's candidate for police court judge in 1896) before returning to the Republicans. President William McKinley appointed him notary public in Alaska in 1900, but he returned to California three years later, where he died in 1907.

== Personal life ==
Haskell married Annie Fader, a socialist and suffragist, in 1882. Their son, Astaroth, known as Roth, was born in 1886. The couple split in 1897 but remained married through Haskell's 1907 death.

== See also ==
- Kaweah Colony

== Bibliography ==
- Fogarty, Robert S. (1980). "Haskell, Burnette". Dictionary of American Communal and Utopian History. Westport, Connecticut: Greenwood Press. p. 47. ISBN 978-0-313-21347-2. OCLC 251590189.
- Johnpoll, Bernard K. (1986). "Haskell, Burnette G. (1857–1907)". Biographical Dictionary of the American Left. Westport, Connecticut: Greenwood Press. pp. 183–186. ISBN 978-0-313-24200-7.
- "Finding aid of the Robert Ferral Letter C058847". Online Access of California.
