= Louisa County, Virginia =

County in Virginia, United States

- County
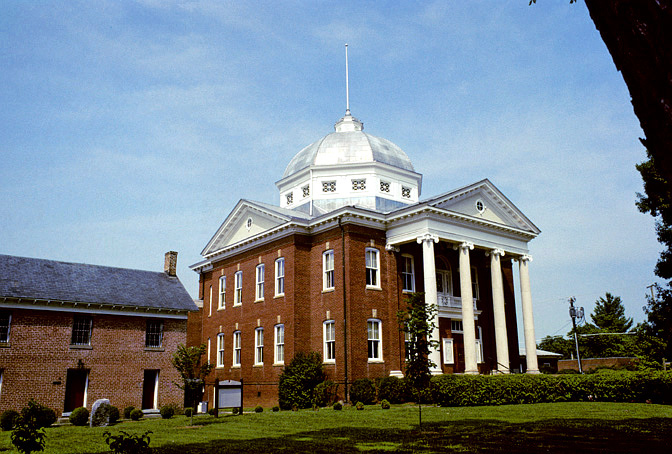
- Louisa County Courthouse

- Flag Seal Logo

- Location within the U.S. state of Virginia
- Coordinates: 37°59′N 77°58′W
- Country: United States
- State: Virginia
- Founded: 1742
- Named for: Louise of Great Britain
- Seat: Louisa
- Largest town: Louisa

Area
  - Total: 511 sq mi (1,320 km^{2})
  - Land: 496 sq mi (1,280 km^{2})
  - Water: 15 sq mi (39 km^{2}) 2.9%

Population (2020)
  - Total: 37,596
  - Estimate (2025): 42,924 ▲
  - Density: 75.8/sq mi (29.3/km^{2})
- Time zone: UTC−5 (Eastern)
  - Summer (DST): UTC−4 (EDT)
- Congressional district: 5th
- Website: www.louisacounty.gov

Louisa County is a county located in the Commonwealth of Virginia. As of the 2020 census, the population was 37,596. The county seat is Louisa.

== History ==
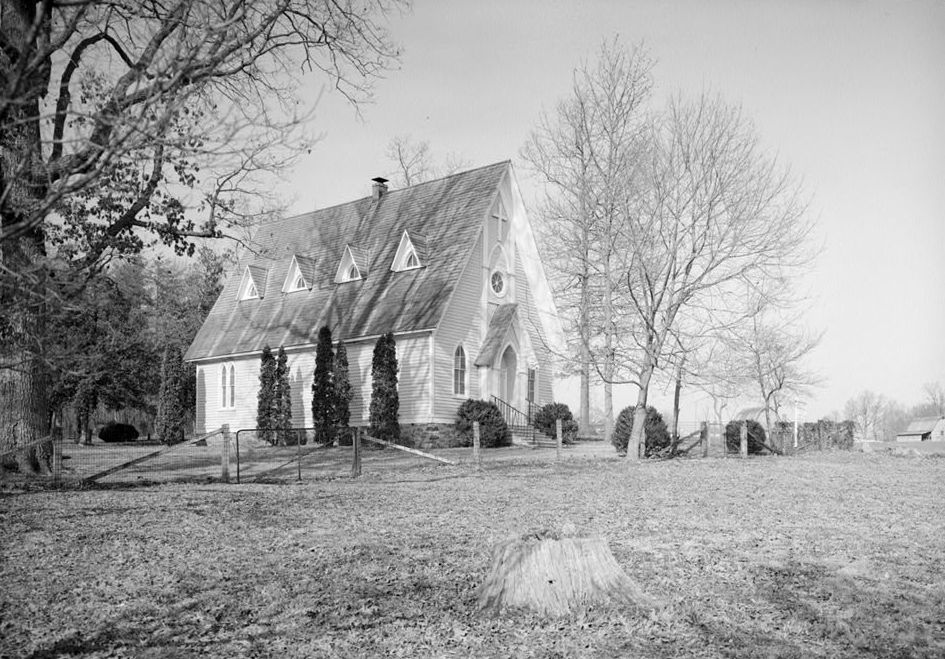
St. John's Chapel, near Boswells Tavern, Louisa County, Historic American Buildings Survey

Prior to colonial settlement, the area comprising Louisa County was occupied by several indigenous peoples including the Tutelo, the Monacan, and the Manahoac peoples, who eventually fled to join the Cayuga Iroquois (Haudenosaunee) people in New York state under pressure from English settlers.

Louisa County was established in 1742 from Hanover County. The county is named for Princess Louise of Great Britain, youngest daughter of King George II, and wife of King Frederick V of Denmark.

Patrick Henry lived for some time in Louisa County on Roundabout Creek in 1764. Henry was being mentored at that time by the Louisa County magnate Thomas Johnson the representative of Louisa County in the House of Burgesses. In 1765, Patrick Henry won his first election to represent Louisa County in the House of Burgesses. At the end of the eighteenth century and in the early nineteenth century, numerous free mixed-race families migrated together from here to Kentucky, where neighbors began to identify them as Melungeon.

The Virginia Central Railroad was completed through Louisa County in 1838–1840. During the Civil War, it was an important supply line for the Confederate armies. As a result, several significant cavalry actions took place in the county, particularly one fought at Trevilians in 1864.

=== 20th century to present ===
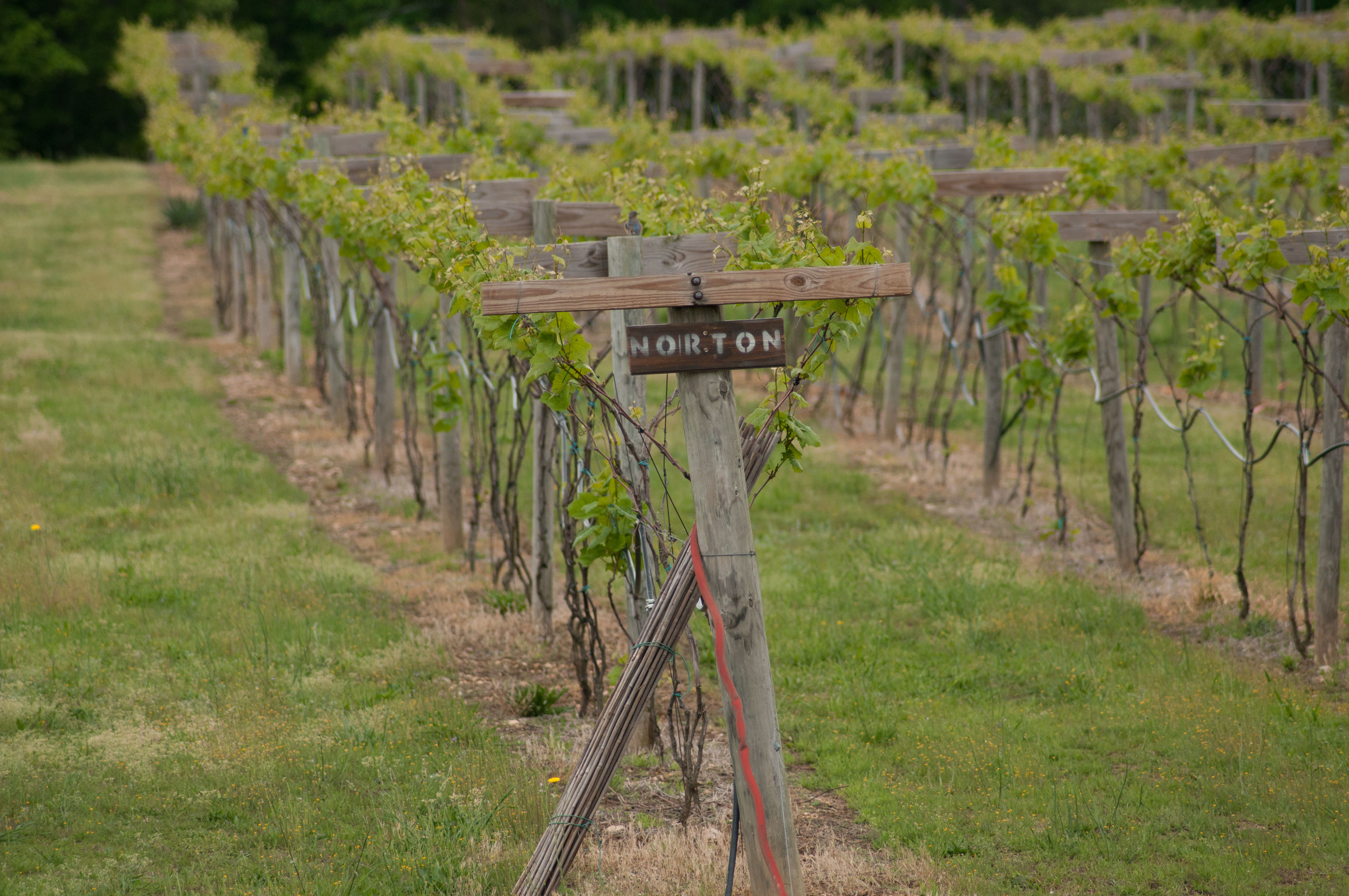
Cooper Vineyards in Louisa is the first winery on the East Coast and the second in the country to be awarded the fourth and highest, Platinum certification by Leadership in Energy and Environmental Design (LEED)

The Twin Oaks Community is one of the country's oldest secular communes, established by its first eight members in 1967. This was part of a national movement among numerous young people to "get back to the land" and live in more simple ways based in community. Louisa is also home to the Acorn Community, a rural, cooperative, income sharing community on about 80 acres, founded in 1993 by one of the founding members of Twin Oaks, Kat Kincade. Another newly forming community as of 2011 is the Living Energy Farm, a 'neo-Amish' farm, where no fossil fuels will be used but new technologies such as solar will be embraced.

Lake Anna, a 13,000-acre (53 km^{2}) artificial lake, and the associated North Anna Nuclear Generating Station were built by Virginia Power in the 1970s. In recent years the predominantly rural county has grown because of retirees' settling near Lake Anna, and because of its convenient location for commuters. It is an hour's drive or less from Richmond, Fredericksburg and Charlottesville.

For a discussion and additional information on Louisa County history, see: Louisa County Historical Notes.

=== 2011 earthquake ===
The U.S. Geological Survey reported that a magnitude 5.8 earthquake hit Virginia on Tuesday, August 23, 2011, at 1:51 PM EST. The quake occurred at an approximate depth of 3.7 miles and was centered in Louisa County (location at 37.944°N, 77.942°W), five miles south-southwest of Mineral and 38 miles northwest of Richmond. According to Associated Press, "Shaking was felt at the White House and all over the East Coast, as far south as Charleston, S.C. Parts of the Pentagon, White House and Capitol were evacuated." It was also felt in parts of Canada.

Damage totals in Louisa County totaled over $70 million:

- $57.5 million in damage to public school structures
- $11.5 million in damage to residential structures
- $400,000 in damage to religious structures
- $400,000 in damage to commercial structures
- $500,000 in damage to government structures

== Geography ==
According to the U.S. Census Bureau, the county has a total area of 511 square miles (1,320 km^{2}), of which 496 square miles (1,280 km^{2}) is land and 15 square miles (39 km^{2}) (2.9%) is water.

=== Adjacent counties ===
- Orange County – north
- Spotsylvania County – northeast
- Hanover County – east
- Goochland County – south
- Fluvanna County – southwest
- Albemarle County – west

=== Major highways ===
- I-64
- US 15
- US 33
- US 250
- US 522
- SR 22
- SR 208
- SR 231

== Demographics ==
Historical population
Census	Pop.	Note	%±
1790	8,467		—
1800	11,892		40.5%
1810	11,900		0.1%
1820	13,746		15.5%
1830	16,151		17.5%
1840	15,433		−4.4%
1850	16,691		8.2%
1860	16,701		0.1%
1870	16,332		−2.2%
1880	18,942		16.0%
1890	16,997		−10.3%
1900	16,517		−2.8%
1910	16,578		0.4%
1920	17,089		3.1%
1930	14,309		−16.3%
1940	13,665		−4.5%
1950	12,826		−6.1%
1960	12,959		1.0%
1970	14,004		8.1%
1980	17,825		27.3%
1990	20,325		14.0%
2000	25,627		26.1%
2010	33,153		29.4%
2020	37,596		13.4%
2025 (est.)	42,924	▲	14.2%
U.S. Decennial Census; 1790–1960 1900–1990; 1990–2000 2010 2020

=== Racial and ethnic composition ===
Louisa County, Virginia – Racial and ethnic composition Note: the US Census treats Hispanic/Latino as an ethnic category. This table excludes Latinos from the racial categories and assigns them to a separate category. Hispanics/Latinos may be of any race.
Race / Ethnicity (NH = Non-Hispanic)	Pop 1980	Pop 1990	Pop 2000	Pop 2010	Pop 2020	% 1980	% 1990	% 2000	% 2010	% 2020
White alone (NH)	11,859	14,899	19,517	25,562	28,535	66.53%	73.30%	76.16%	77.10%	75.90%
Black or African American alone (NH)	5,767	5,205	5,507	5,832	5,365	32.35%	25.61%	21.49%	17.59%	14.27%
Native American or Alaska Native alone (NH)	16	64	105	106	93	0.09%	0.31%	0.41%	0.32%	0.25%
Asian alone (NH)	10	35	63	158	251	0.06%	0.17%	0.25%	0.48%	0.67%
Native Hawaiian or Pacific Islander alone (NH)	x	x	3	15	18	x	x	0.01%	0.05%	0.05%
Other race alone (NH)	13	14	9	41	155	0.07%	0.07%	0.04%	0.12%	0.41%
Mixed race or Multiracial (NH)	x	x	241	677	1,814	x	x	0.94%	2.04%	4.82%
Hispanic or Latino (any race)	160	108	182	762	1,365	0.90%	0.53%	0.71%	2.30%	3.63%
Total	17,825	20,325	25,627	33,153	37,596	100.00%	100.00%	100.00%	100.00%	100.00%

=== 2020 census ===
As of the 2020 census, the county had a population of 37,596. The median age was 45.2 years. 20.6% of residents were under the age of 18 and 20.5% of residents were 65 years of age or older. For every 100 females there were 96.3 males, and for every 100 females age 18 and over there were 94.9 males age 18 and over.

0.0% of residents lived in urban areas, while 100.0% lived in rural areas.

There were 14,921 households in the county, of which 27.7% had children under the age of 18 living with them and 22.4% had a female householder with no spouse or partner present. About 23.7% of all households were made up of individuals and 10.9% had someone living alone who was 65 years of age or older.

There were 17,489 housing units, of which 14.7% were vacant. Among occupied housing units, 80.3% were owner-occupied and 19.7% were renter-occupied. The homeowner vacancy rate was 1.2% and the rental vacancy rate was 5.7%.

=== 2000 census ===
As of the census of 2000, there were 25,627 people, 9,945 households, and 7,259 families residing in the county. The population density was 52 people per square mile (20 people/km^{2}). There were 11,855 housing units at an average density of 24 units per square mile (9.3 units/km^{2}). The racial makeup of the county was 50.96% White, 46.58% Black or African American, 0.42% Native American, 0.25% Asian, 0.01% Pacific Islander, 0.18% from other races, and 1.01% from two or more races. 0.71% of the population were Hispanic or Latino of any race.

There were 9,945 households, out of which 31.20% had children under the age of 18 living with them, 57.30% were married couples living together, 10.80% had a female householder with no husband present, and 27.00% were non-families. 22.10% of all households were made up of individuals, and 9.00% had someone living alone who was 65 years of age or older. The average household size was 2.56 and the average family size was 2.97.

In the county, the population was spread out, with 24.40% under the age of 18, 6.60% from 18 to 24, 29.90% from 25 to 44, 26.20% from 45 to 64, and 12.90% who were 65 years of age or older. The median age was 39 years. For every 100 females, there were 96.90 males. For every 100 females age 18 and over, there were 94.90 males.

The median income for a household in the county was $39,402, and the median income for a family was $44,722. Males had a median income of $31,764 versus $24,826 for females. The per capita income for the county was $19,479. About 7.10% of families and 10.20% of the population were below the poverty line, including 13.00% of those under age 18 and 12.50% of those age 65 or over.

Although the county's 2008 population is only 31,000, it is one of the fastest-growing in Virginia, as people have moved near Lake Anna. At least 15 new housing developments have sprouted in five years.

== Communities ==
=== Towns ===
- Louisa
- Mineral

=== Census-designated place ===
- Blue Ridge Shores

=== Other unincorporated communities ===
- Apple Grove
- Bumpass
- Cuckoo
- Ferncliff
- Gum Spring
- Holly Grove
- Orchid
- Twin Oaks Community
- Trevilians
- Yanceyville
- Zion Crossroads

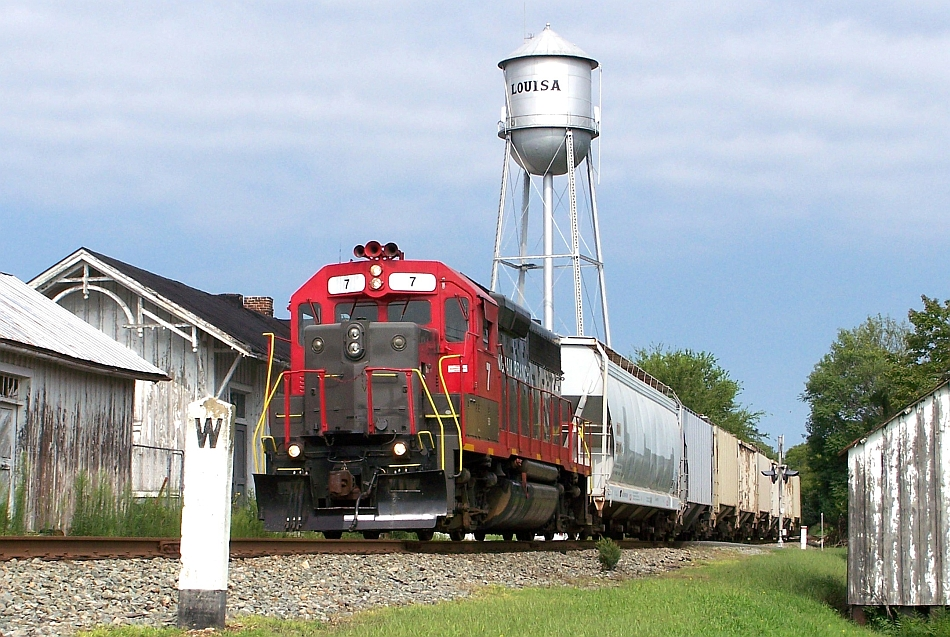
A local train of the Buckingham Branch railroad passes the C&O Depot and water tower in Louisa.

== Historical places and points of interest ==
- Green Springs Historic District
- Jerdone Castle
- Lake Anna
- Twin Oaks Community, a secular commune, is located in Louisa County.
- Acorn Community, another income sharing community in the county, which runs the Southern Exposure Seed Exchange business as its principal source of income.

== Education ==
Louisa County Public Schools covers the entire county.

== Notable people ==
- James Waddel Alexander (1804–1859), born in Louisa County, noted Presbyterian minister and professor at Princeton Theological Seminary
- Arthur P. Bagby (1794–1858), born in Louisa County, tenth Governor of Alabama from 1837 to 1841.
- Henry "Box" Brown (c.1816–after 1889), an enslaved man who found liberty by mailing himself inside a wooden crate to Pennsylvania abolitionists.
- Paxus Calta (b. 1957), anti-nuclear activist, blogger and member of Twin Oaks Community and Acorn Community.
- Dabney Carr (1743–1773), celebrated Louisa County patriot.
- Patrick Henry (1736–1799), at Roundabout Plantation, eight miles southwest of Louisa Court House, Patrick Henry lived in Louisa County from 1765 to 1768, when he sat for Louisa County in the House of Burgesses. This was the beginning of his political career.
- Charles W. Kent (1860–1917), English scholar
- Charles Henry Langston (1817–1892), born free and of mixed racial ancestry, one of two men tried and convicted after Oberlin-Wellington Rescue, abolitionist and political activist in Ohio and Kansas.
- John Mercer Langston (1829–1899), abolitionist, activist, educator and politician; in 1855 first black person in Ohio elected to public office, first dean of Howard University law school, first president of Virginia State University, in 1888 first black person to be elected to the United States Congress from Virginia.
- Flora Molton (1908–1990), singer.
- John Overton (1766–1833), born in Louisa County, notable political leader who was an adviser to Andrew Jackson and co-founder of Memphis, Tennessee.
- James Waddel (1739–1805), celebrated Presbyterian preacher

== Politics ==
United States presidential election results for Louisa County, Virginia
Year	Republican		Democratic		Third party(ies)	
Year	No.	%	No.	%	No.	%
1912	91	11.10%	578	70.49%	151	18.41%
1916	263	26.70%	710	72.08%	12	1.22%
1920	312	31.11%	684	68.20%	7	0.70%
1924	282	26.96%	707	67.59%	57	5.45%
1928	772	51.26%	734	48.74%	0	0.00%
1932	366	28.57%	879	68.62%	36	2.81%
1936	486	30.41%	1,100	68.84%	12	0.75%
1940	573	38.66%	896	60.46%	13	0.88%
1944	634	40.33%	930	59.16%	8	0.51%
1948	701	41.45%	782	46.24%	208	12.30%
1952	1,135	52.26%	1,025	47.19%	12	0.55%
1956	1,152	47.43%	795	32.73%	482	19.84%
1960	1,170	47.60%	1,244	50.61%	44	1.79%
1964	1,369	44.12%	1,731	55.78%	3	0.10%
1968	1,510	38.09%	1,290	32.54%	1,164	29.36%
1972	2,545	63.55%	1,338	33.41%	122	3.05%
1976	2,151	41.89%	2,857	55.64%	127	2.47%
1980	2,633	46.14%	2,809	49.23%	264	4.63%
1984	3,789	57.91%	2,703	41.31%	51	0.78%
1988	3,831	57.16%	2,789	41.61%	82	1.22%
1992	3,461	41.66%	3,399	40.92%	1,447	17.42%
1996	3,768	45.27%	3,761	45.19%	794	9.54%
2000	5,461	54.09%	4,309	42.68%	326	3.23%
2004	7,083	58.85%	4,844	40.25%	108	0.90%
2008	8,182	53.29%	6,978	45.45%	193	1.26%
2012	9,215	56.01%	6,953	42.26%	284	1.73%
2016	10,528	59.71%	6,212	35.23%	891	5.05%
2020	13,294	60.66%	8,269	37.73%	352	1.61%
2024	15,084	62.48%	8,779	36.36%	281	1.16%

== See also ==
- National Register of Historic Places listings in Louisa County, Virginia
