= Restoration colony =

A restoration colony was one of a number of land grants in North America given by King Charles II of England in the later half of the 17th century, ostensibly as a reward to his supporters in the Stuart Restoration. The grants marked the resumption of English colonization of the Americas after a 30-year hiatus. The two major restoration colonies were the Province of Pennsylvania and the Province of Carolina. The founding of the Carolinas is described thus:

In 1663, three years after he was restored to his father's throne, England's Charles II granted a vast territory named Carolina to a group of supporters during his years of exile. Its boundaries extended from Virginia southward to central Florida and eastward to the Atlantic Ocean. Within this potential empire, eight London-based proprietors, including several involved in Barbados sugar plantations, gained governmental powers and semifeudal rights to the land. The system of governance planned for Carolina had both feudal and modern features. To lure settlers, the proprietors promised religious freedom and offered land free for the asking. But onto this generous land offer they grafted a scheme for a semimedieval government in which they, their deputies, and a few noblemen would monopolize political power. Reacting to a generation of revolutionary turbulence in England, they designed Carolina as a model of social and political stability in which a hereditary aristocracy would check boisterous small landholders.

The Colony of Rhode Island and Providence Plantations and Connecticut Colony were given their formal charters and Rhode Island even honored the King with King's Province (what has since been renamed Washington County, Rhode Island).
