= Vegetarian Creek =

Stream in Allen and Neosho County, Kansas U.S.

Coordinates: 37°43′27″N 95°25′42″W

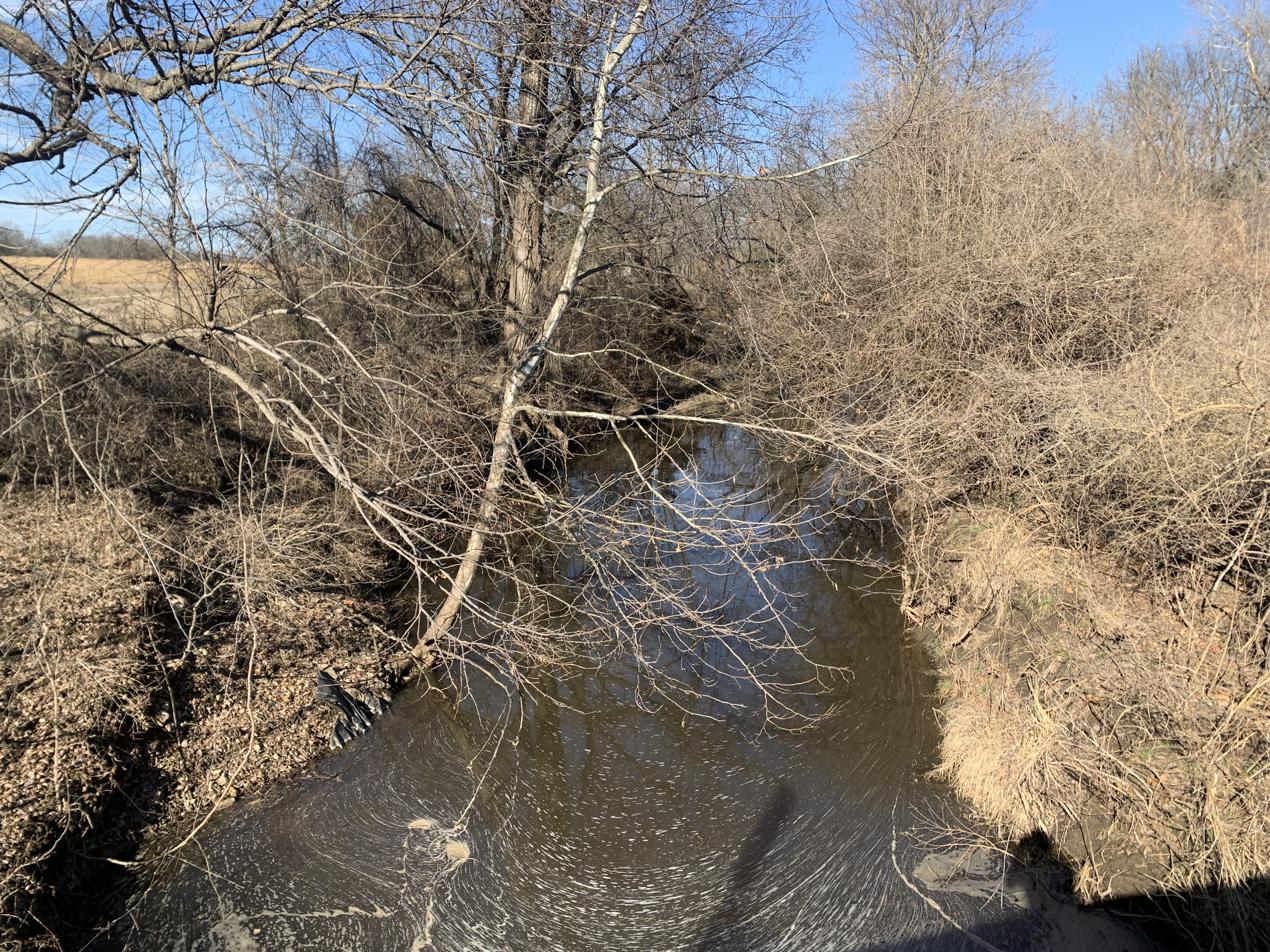
Vegetarian Creek at Arizona Road south of Humboldt, Kansas

Vegetarian Creek is a stream in Allen and Neosho counties, Kansas in the United States.

Vegetarian Creek was named in memory of Octagon City, a colony of vegetarians in the 1850s.

== See also ==
- List of rivers of Kansas
