= Twin Oaks Community, Virginia =

Intentional community in Virginia, US

Twin Oaks Community
- Intentional community
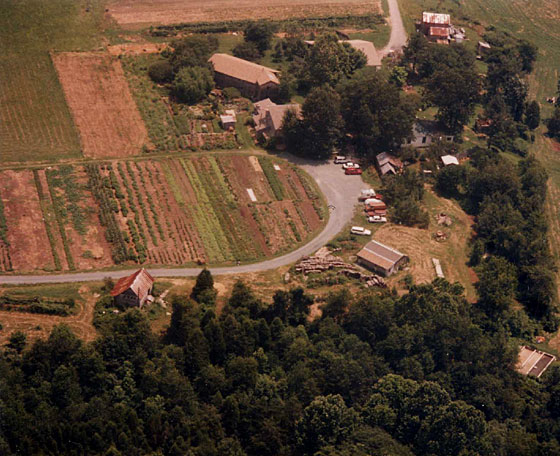
- An aerial view of Twin Oaks' main entrance and communal garden
- Interactive map of Twin Oaks Community
- Coordinates: 37.9325°N 77.991667°W
- Country: United States
- State: Virginia
- County: Louisa
- Established: 1967

Area
  - Total: 465 acres (188 ha)
- Website: www.twinoaks.org

Twin Oaks Community is an ecovillage and intentional community of approximately one hundred people living on 450 acres (1.8 km^{2}) in Louisa County, Virginia, United States. It is a member of the Federation of Egalitarian Communities. Founded in 1967, it is one of the longest-enduring and largest secular intentional communities in North America. The community's core values are cooperation, egalitarianism, nonviolence, sustainability, and income sharing. About 100 adults and 17 children live in the community.

== Founding ==
The community was founded on a 123-acre (0.50 km^{2}) tobacco farm in 1967 by a group of eight individuals with no farming experience that included Kat Kinkade, who wrote two books about the community. The community's inspiration was B. F. Skinner's novel Walden Two, which describes a fictional behaviorist utopia. However, Skinner's vision quickly faded from prominence at Twin Oaks, as behaviorist principles were abandoned in favor of egalitarian principles. The community struggled greatly during its first few years, from high member turnover and low member income. According to Kinkade, the community avoided the problems of laziness, freeloading, and lack of structure stereotypically associated with communes by adopting a structured, yet flexible, labor system.

Modified versions of the community's organizational structure and labor credit system survive. As in Skinner's novel, the original labor credit system utilized "variable" credit hours. Certain jobs were worth more credit hours than others in order to make each job desirable. What the community found once the population reached about 40, is that there was neither universally desirable work, nor undesirable work and the variable credit hour system created incentives that encouraged work. The updated plan uses "standardized" credits; each job in the community is valued equally in credit hours.

== Life as a member ==
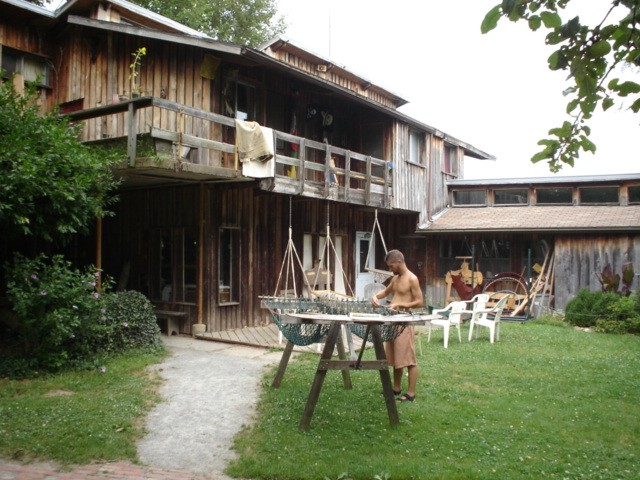
Hammock-making was one of Twin Oaks' main sources of income

Twin Oaks has approximately 100 members. People interested in joining Twin Oaks must attend a scheduled three-week visitor period. During this period, visitors tour the community and attend orientations on various aspects of membership. Unlike most co-housing situations, there is no cost to join the community, nor any rent or ongoing costs associated with living there. Basic necessities—housing, clothing, food, health care—are all provided to members in return for their 36 weekly hours of work. Since 2011, Twin Oaks has consistently had a waiting list, so visitors who are accepted for membership need to wait typically three to nine months before they can join. Before a new member can join, while the community is at its population capacity, a current member needs to drop membership. Historically, Twin Oaks has expanded its housing when it has had a waiting list for a prolonged period by building new residences and expanding the stock of bedrooms available.

A member of Twin Oaks works around 36 hours a week. Some labor is directed toward generating income, and the rest consists of domestic work like gardening/food production, cooking, bike and vehicle repair, building maintenance, cleaning, and child care. Most Twin Oaks members perform a wide variety of tasks each week instead of spending all of their time in one labor area. Members can also choose to work outside of Twin Oaks. The income from this labor may go to the community, although some portion of it can go into a member's "vacation earnings". Excess labor done in a week accumulates as vacation time.

Twin Oaks' members have access to the Internet as well as to public computers. Members can also watch movies and TV programs. People in the community often gather for other recreational activities such as dancing, meditating, discussing literature, staging musicals, and playing board games.

Twin Oaks members are religiously diverse. The membership includes Christians, atheists, pagans, Buddhists, and others. The community hosts pagan handfastings, Equinox parties, and Thanksgiving dinners, and it celebrates June 16, the anniversary of its founding.

Interpersonal relationships are also diverse. Multiple types of gender relationships coexist, including monogamy, celibacy, and polyamory.

Residents live in dormitory-style living quarters spread out across the community. Each member has a private bedroom, but shares public spaces.

Member turnover is no longer as high as it was in the community's early years, and many former Twin Oakers live in nearby Charlottesville and Louisa to maintain ties to the community.

The community itself acknowledges that it has yet to create the perfect society; their founder, Kat Kinkade, provides a guidebook entitled "Not Utopia Yet" to visitors. Those who choose to live at Twin Oaks for several years—including founder Kinkade—sometimes feel "trapped" there. This is because members have little opportunity to build up equity or savings. The BBC Four television series Utopia: In Search of the Dream, broadcast on August 15, 2017, devoted an 11-minute segment to Twin Oaks. Members and one former member (the founders' daughter), interviewed by Professor Richard Clay, expressed concerns about the inability to build savings, and complex interpersonal relationships. Clay observed that 20 percent of the membership turned over annually.

== Community businesses ==
Twin Oaks' 36-hour work week is divided between domestic and income-producing labor. Twin Oaks operates several community-owned businesses, including Twin Oaks Tofu, Twin Oaks Hammocks, and Twin Oaks Book Indexing. Additionally, Twin Oaks packs wholesale seeds for Southern Exposure Seed Exchange. From these sources, Twin Oaks generates around $600,000 per year. This money pays for community upkeep and goods that cannot be produced on site, and each member receives a monthly stipend for personal use (i.e., to purchase items that the community does not provide). In news segments, Twin Oaks members often attribute the longevity of the community to its engagement in capitalism through its tofu and hammocks businesses. Due to a large wildfire in 2024 which destroyed critical rope and stretcher making equipment for hammocks, the business has been largely shuttered.

== Supporting the communities movement ==
Twin Oaks has helped establish three sister communities: Acorn Community, about 7 miles (11 km) from Twin Oaks, Living Energy Farm, also in Louisa County, Virginia; and East Wind Community in south central Missouri.

Twin Oaks also hosts annual intentional community gatherings cosponsored by the Fellowship for Intentional Community: The Communities Conference, and the Women's Gathering, both of which take place every August.

== Media coverage ==
The history of Twin Oaks Community is detailed extensively in two books by Kathleen (Kat) Kinkade, one of the co-founders of the community. The first, A Walden Two Experiment, covers the first five years of the community. The second, Is it Utopia Yet?, covers the next 20 years. Another book from the 1980s, Living the Dream, by Ingrid Komar (the mother of a member at the time the book was written), also discusses Twin Oaks' history. About half a dozen dissertations and a dozen master's theses have been written about the community, as well. In 1998, the Washington Post Magazine did a cover story on Twin Oaks. A 21st century book, Surviving the Dream, by Craig Kurtz (a member from 2007 to 2020), analyzes Twin Oaks' political structure.

== Ecology ==
Twin Oaks seeks to be a model of sustainability. The average Twin Oaks member consumes fewer resources than the average American due to the community's practices of resource sharing and self-sufficiency. Members hold all resources in common except for the personal items they keep in their bedrooms. For instance, members share housing, a fleet of 17 vehicles, and a large "clothing library". Twin Oaks members consume 70% less gasoline, 80% less electricity, and 76% less natural gas per capita than do their neighbors.
