= Squatter's Cabin =

Historic house in California, United States

- U.S. National Register of Historic Places
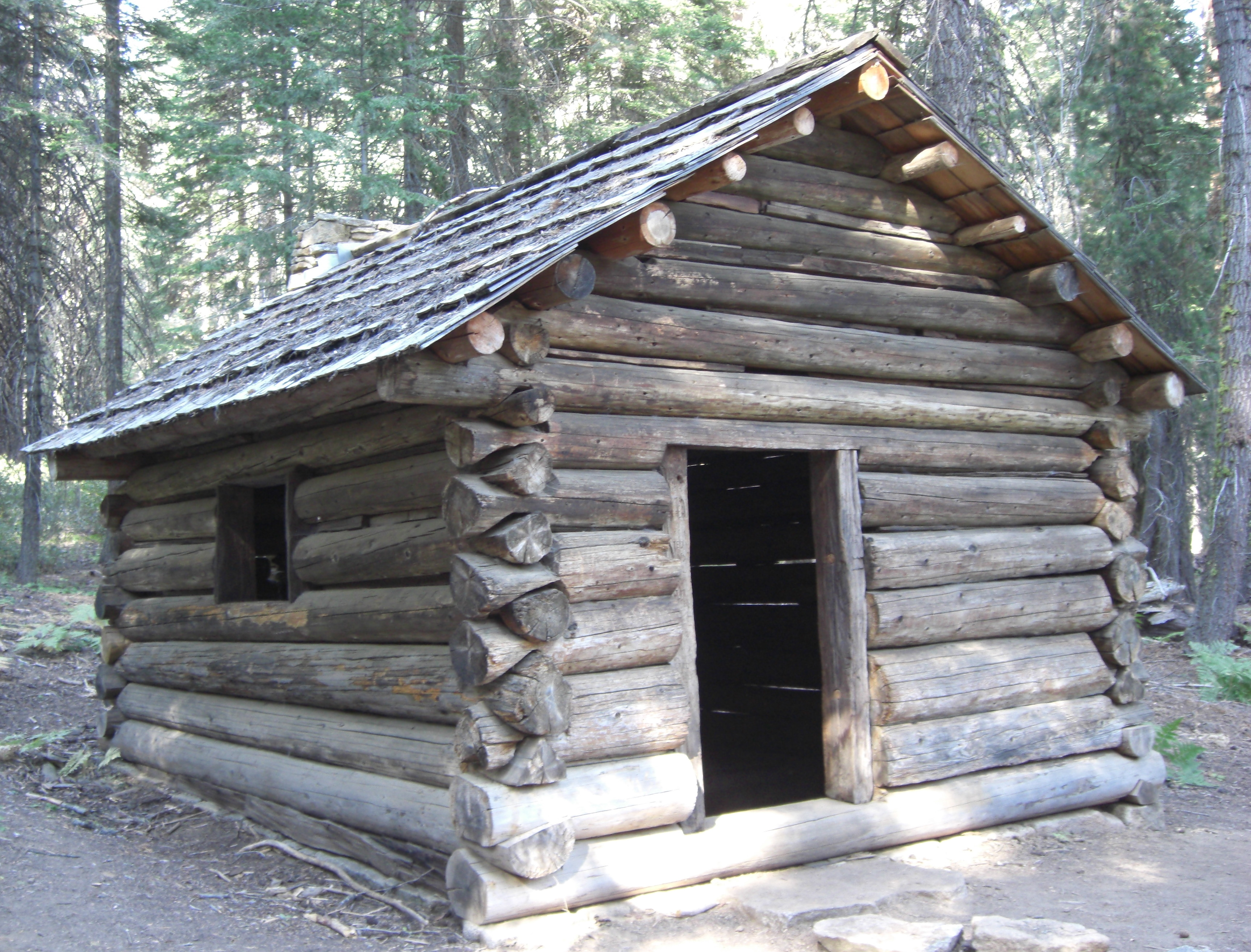
- Squatter's Cabin

- Location within California Location within the United States
- Nearest city: Three Rivers, California
- Coordinates: 36°33′31″N 118°45′9″W
- Built: 1886
- Architect: John Vest
- NRHP reference No.: 77000116
- Added to NRHP: March 8, 1977

The Squatter's Cabin is the only remnant of the Kaweah Colony, a socialist utopian group established in the Sierra Nevada in the 1880s. Now located in Sequoia National Park, the one-room log structure is located at Huckleberry Meadow near the Giant Forest.
