= Southern exposure (terminology) =

Southern exposure is increased sunlight received by south-facing land, walls, windows, and other relevant entities in the Northern Hemisphere. Southern exposure is often considered "full sun".

Sunlight differentials for southern exposure are caused by the 23-degree axial tilt of the Earth, which creates an uneven distribution of sunlight based on geographical location. Southern exposure is commonly discussed in real estate discourse because it can affect a structure's capacity for solar energy options. Southern exposure is also important to landscaping and land conservation. It impacts the native plant life that will survive in a given area by affecting the optimal landscaping compositions, gardening patterns, and seasonal growth of flora.
