= Organic Seed Growers and Trade Association =

The Organic Seed Growers and Trade Association (OSGATA) is a trade association based in Maine, United States, which represents organic farmers, seed growers and seed suppliers.

It is known primarily for its March 2011 initiation of a lawsuit against Monsanto Corporation to stop it from suing farmers who have been "contaminated" by their genetically modified seeds. The case was dismissed by the judge after OSGATA failed to provide evidence of a single case of Mosanto suing a farmer over cross-contamination. OSGATA appealed the decision in January 2013 to the US Federal Court of Appeals, which upheld the lower court's ruling. OSGATA appealed the case again to the Supreme Court which declined to hear the case.

OSGATA argued the case as being about protecting members against prosecution following "accidental contamination" with Monsanto patented crops, but Monsanto's chief counsel clarified that "Monsanto never has and has committed it never will sue if our patented seed or traits are found in a farmer's field as a result of inadvertent means." For example, in Monsanto Canada Inc v Schmeiser, an initial claim of accidental contamination is balanced against a finding of fact that 95–98% of the crop was actually infringing.
