= East Wind Community =

Intentional community

Coordinates: 36°33′21″N 92°18′29″W

East Wind Community is an intentional community located in the Missouri Ozarks. Founded in 1974, it is a secular and democratic community in which members hold all community assets in common. Each member is also given food, shelter, clothing, medical care, education, and a modest monthly stipend. All major decisions are made by direct democratic processes with managers for various positions being elected annually.

== Overview ==
East Wind Community owns 1,045 acres (4.23 km^{2}) of land and several businesses and its members pursue a mix of agricultural, industrial, domestic and social pursuits. The community is located off Route 160 on the southern end of county road 547 in Ozark County just outside Tecumseh, Missouri.

The community has acres of gardens for vegetables and herbs, small orchards, as well as tens of acres of pasture. In the past decade, homegrown food production and processing has become a major focus. Tree planting and holistic forestry management are also a priority. Members learn and teach homesteading skills ranging from cheesemaking and woodworking to canning and auto repair.

The East Wind Community has several income sources including a nut butter business named East Wind Nut Butters that generates $500,000 annually. The community manufactures peanut butter, cashew butter, almond butter and tahini as well as a peanut butter and a tahini that are organic. In addition they produce "Utopian Rope Sandals", also known as "Utopes". They used to produce handmade drums through Slackjaw Percussion. Members are required to work a certain number of hours and income from the businesses is used to support the community.

Prospective members are selected by a membership team and are then invited for a three-week visitor period, at the end of which they may become provisional members, barring the existence of too many concerns within the community. Following a one-year provisional membership full members have the opportunity to call for a vote on any new member who may either be too disruptive or who is failing to do their fair share of the labor. There is also an associate status for people who do not wish to make a full commitment to the community. A provisional member has an option to take a leave. If during the first two weeks as a provisional member this leave may be up to a year long.

East Wind is a member of the Federation of Egalitarian Communities, which also includes the communities Twin Oaks, Sandhill Farm, and several others. There are many community conferences and labor exchanges between the communities, and there is a fund which all the communities pay into to help cover any major medical expenses.

Members live in dorm style buildings and there is a central dining hall, laundry and shower house. There are also several personal shelters designated as doubles for couples and visitors. Common spaces for recreational activities including computers also exist.

For much of East Wind's history, membership has hovered around 70 people. From late 2022 to early 2025, membership has decreased more than usual, and over the past 12 months has decreased at an increasing rate. As of February 2025, fewer than 40 people are living on the farm and of those, 29 are full members.

== See also ==
- Egalitarian community
- Walden Two
