= Southern Exposure Seed Exchange =

American seed company

Southern Exposure Seed Exchange (SESE) is a cooperatively owned seed company based out of Mineral, Virginia. SESE is a source for heirloom seeds and other open-pollinated (non-hybrid) seeds with an emphasis on vegetables, flowers, and herbs that grow well in the Mid-Atlantic region. SESE also supports seed saving and traditional seed breeding through their product line, through lectures and workshops, and by working with over 90 small seed-growing farmers in the Mid-Atlantic and other parts of the United States. SESE publishes an intermittent email newsletter and blog for gardeners, as well as the Southern Exposure Seed Exchange Catalog and Garden Guide.

SESE has introduced family heirloom varieties such as Edmonson cucumber, Thelma Sanders Sweet Potato squash, and White Mountain Cabbage Collards, and reintroduced heirloom varieties long absent from the marketplace, such as the Amish Moon & Stars watermelon. It pledges not to knowingly buy or sell Genetically Modified (GMO) seeds or plants.

== History ==
Jeff McCormack of Charlottesville, Virginia, founded SESE. Its first catalog was printed for 1983, with 65 varieties. In 1999, Jeff sold SESE to Acorn Community Farm, an intentional community in central Virginia. Under Ira Wallace's leadership, SESE greatly expanded over the years. Ira Wallace is a renowned organic gardener, author, and educator who manages the Southern Exposure Seed Exchange, a cooperatively owned seed company. She has played a significant role in promoting sustainable agriculture and seed saving, particularly in the Southern United States.

The operational cycle for SESE is highly seasonal. From January to April the focus is on filling seed orders. In May and June, sweet potato slips are shipped. From March to October there is much work in the gardens, including tending seed crops and taking trial notes. In September and October garlic, onion bulbs, ginseng and goldenseal are shipped. In October and November, there is a focus on seed cleaning, germination testing, and catalog editing.

SESE is a member of the Organic Seed Growers and Trade Association which brought a lawsuit against Monsanto to prevent them from suing organic farmers when they are contaminated by Monsanto products. While SESE and OSGATA technically lost the suit, the Federal Appeals Judge panel did rule that Monsanto could not sue farmers with less than 1% contamination levels.

Southern Exposure Seed Exchange uses both USDA certified organic seed stock as well as non-certified ecologically grown seeds from trusted sources. It pledges not to knowingly buy or sell genetically engineered seeds or plants. SESE has introduced heirloom varieties long absent from the marketplace, such as the Amish Moon & Stars watermelon and the Big Rainbow tomato.

Other organizations SESE collaborates with include the Organic Seed Alliance, the Piedmont Environmental Council, the Virginia Association for Biological Farming, Seed Savers Exchange, and Plant a Row for the Hungry.
