= Federation of Egalitarian Communities =

American groups for an egalitarian lifestyle

The Federation of Egalitarian Communities (FEC) is a group of egalitarian communities which have joined together with the common purpose of creating a lifestyle based on equality, cooperation, and harmony with the Earth. A central principal of these communities is that in exchange for a members working quota (typically between 35 and 42 hours per week) the community pays for all aspects of their life style. Members do not typically get salaries; instead, they have small allowances (typically between $75 and $150 per month) with which they may buy luxury items. They live, work and socialize within the community but are free to leave whenever they would like.

There are two full-member communities in the FEC, all of which share the primary values of egalitarianism, non-violence and income-sharing. Approximately 150 people live in the various communities. The organization offers various programs to its member communities, including outreach, labor exchange and catastrophic health care assistance.

In addition to the full membership, the FEC has a lower level of membership, "Communities in Dialog". These are for communities that may share some, but not all of the FEC values, or who are not prepared for full membership.

== Principles ==
Each of the full-member FEC communities holds the following values:

1. Holds its land, labor, income and other resources in common
2. Assumes responsibility for the needs of its members, receiving the products of their labor and distributing these and all other goods equally, or according to need
3. Practices non-violence
4. Uses a form of decision making in which members have an equal opportunity to participate, either through consensus, direct vote, or right of appeal or overrule
5. Actively works to establish the equality of all people and does not permit discrimination on the basis of race, class, creed, ethnic origin, age, sex, sexual orientation, or gender identity
6. Acts to conserve natural resources for present and future generations while striving to continually improve ecological awareness and practice
7. Creates processes for group communication and participation and provides an environment which supports people's development.

== Current communities ==
The following communities are full members of the Federation of Egalitarian Communities:

- East Wind Community in Missouri
- Twin Oaks Community in Virginia

== Communities in Dialog ==
The following communities share most or all of the Federation principles and consider full membership as an option for the future.

- Alpha Farm in Oregon
