= Rebecca Buffum Spring =

Quaker abolitionist and reformer (1811–1911)

- Born: June 8, 1811; Providence, Rhode Island
- Died: 1911 (aged 99–100)
- Spouse: Marcus Spring

Rebecca Buffum Spring (June 8, 1811—1911) was a Quaker abolitionist, educational reformer, feminist, and women's suffrage activist. She was born in Providence, Rhode Island, fourth daughter of Arnold Buffum (1782-1859), who with William Lloyd Garrison founded the New England Anti-Slavery Society, of which he was the first president. Elizabeth ended her education at the age of 16 and became a teacher in an infant school at the request of her father. Elizabeth Buffum Chace was her sister. She was co-founder in 1836 of the Fall River Female Anti-Slavery Society.

She married Marcus Spring (1810-1874), a philanthropic New York businessman, in approximately 1840. She and her husband were long-time friends of Fredrika Bremer, Lydia Maria Child, Margaret Fuller, and Elizabeth Palmer Peabody. The couple had a favorable view of socialism and the welfare of the working classes, and invested their money in utopian communities like Brook Farm and were chief stockholders in the North American Phalanx commune.

== Motherhood ==
She has been criticized, but also defended, for seeing motherhood as a fundamental role of women, and linking abolitionism with the maternal. She argued that motherhood and womanhood were inextricably linked, and claimed that due to their maternal connections, women were best positioned to champion the cause of Abolition. At the first Anti-Slavery Convention in 1837, Spring put forward a motion stating that there is no group more compelled to defend anti-slavery than mothers.

Lydia Maria Child wrote John Brown while he was in jail in Virginia in 1859, asking if she could visit and nurse him; he declined. Rebecca did not ask; she traveled to Charles Town, Virginia, to meet with Brown and offer what consolation she could, and after delay, was allowed to meet with him twice. In her published description of her visits, she implied that there was something holy, even Biblical, in his person, and that he deserved her veneration.

During the American Civil War, Spring and her husband supported a Virginia-based school for slave children. They also financed a soup kitchen to aid the increasing number of fugitives and refugees traveling north in the wake of the Emancipation Proclamation of 1863.

She and her husband were instrumental in the founding of two intentional communities based on the teachings of Charles Fourier: the North American Phalanx (1843), in Red Bank, New Jersey, and then, unhappy with the direction it was taking, the Raritan Bay Union (1853) in Perth Amboy, New Jersey, the latter of which was located on his estate in Eagleswood, New Jersey. The Union sponsored a coed and "racially" integrated boarding school. Theodore Weld was its director, and the Grimké sisters were teachers. In the late 1850s Spring founded the Eagleswood Military Academy. She had two of John Brown's executed raiders, who lacked family to bury them, buried there. In the late 1890s, impoverished, she moved to Southern California to live with her daughter Jeanie Peet, where she became involved with many of the local artists and writers.

== Writings by Rebecca Buffum Spring ==
- Spring, Rebecca Buffum (1994). "A visit to John Brown in 1859". In Salitan, Lucille; Perera, Eve Lewis (eds.). Virtuous lives : four Quaker sisters remember family life, abolitionism, and women's suffrage. New York: Continuum. pp. 122–123. A different version was published in the New York Tribune, December 2, 1859, p. 6.

== Writings about Rebecca Buffum Spring (most recent first) ==
- Lasser, Carol (Spring 2018). ".Conscience and Contradiction: The Moral Ambiguities of Antebellum Reformers Marcus and Rebecca Buffum Spring". Journal of the Early Republic. 38 (1): 1–35. doi:10.1353/jer.2018.0000. S2CID 149180780 – via Ebsco Academic Search Complete.
- Kinser, Brent E. (2007). "Rebecca Buffum Spring and the Carlyles". Carlyle Studies Annual (23): 157–168. JSTOR 26592990.
- Barkin, Sarah (2006), "Rebecca Buffum Spring and the Politics of Motherhood in Antebellum America", Susan B. Anthony and the Struggle for Equal Rights, University of Rochester Research, hdl:1802/2471
- Mullaney, Marie Marmo (1990). "Rebecca Buffum Spring, 1811-1911". In The Woman’s Project of New Jersey (ed.). Past and Promise: Lives of New Jersey Women. Metuchen, New Jersey: Scarecrow Press. pp. 84–86.
- Mullaney, Marie Marmo (Fall–Winter 1986). "Feminism, Utopianism, and Domesticity : The Career of Rebecca Buffum Spring, 1811-1911". New Jersey History. 104 (3–4).
- Warren, Dale (Summer 1967). "Uncle Marcus". New England Galaxy: 16–26. JSTOR 41946562.
- Wyman, Lillie Buffum Chace (1913). "Rebecca Buffum Spring". American Chivalry. Boston: W. B. Clarke Co. pp. 51–67.

== Archival material ==
The Rebecca Spring papers were purchased by the Stanford University Library. There is a published guide. Minser discusses the collection.
