= Phalanx, New Jersey =

Populated place in Monmouth County, New Jersey, US

- Unincorporated community
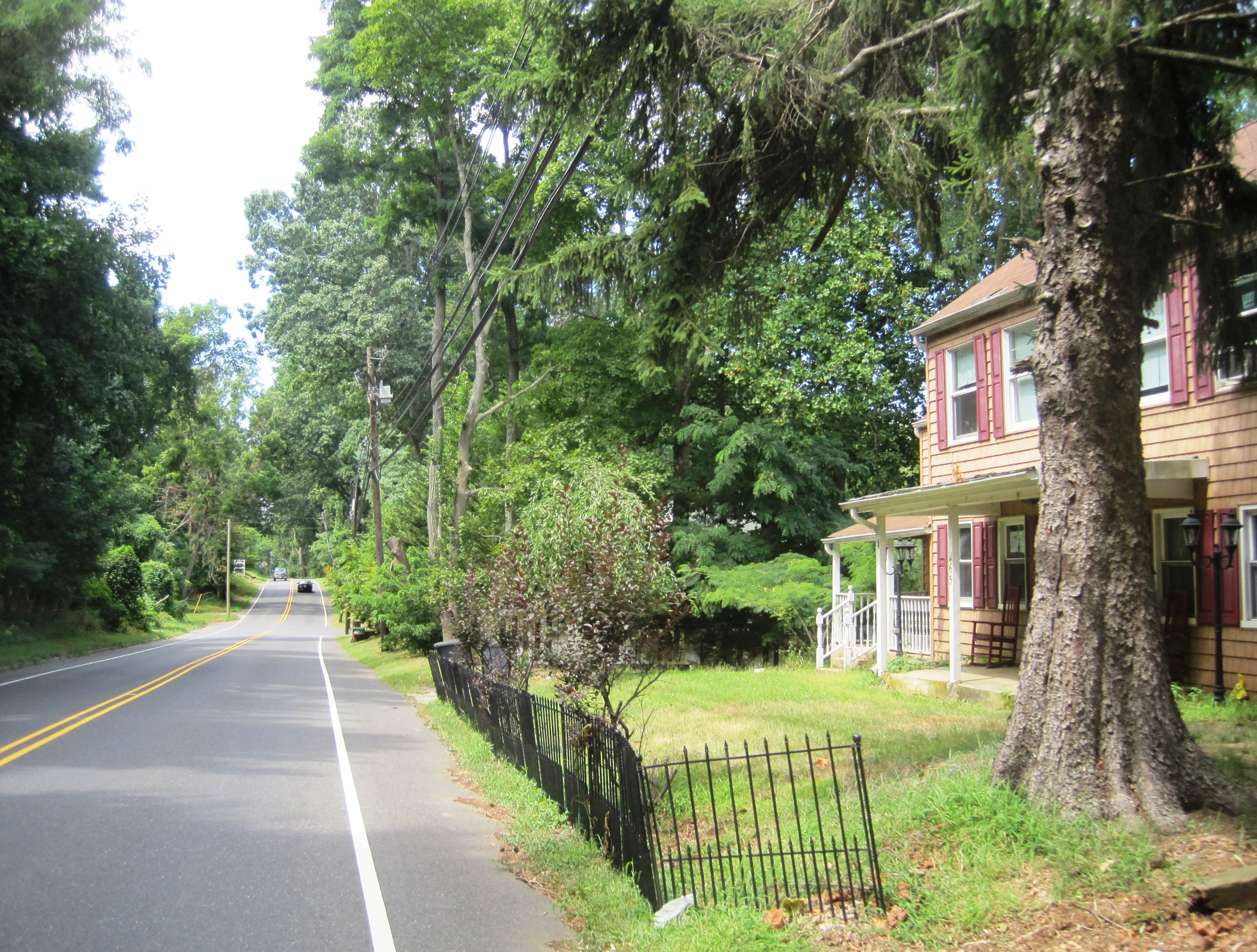
- As seen from Phalanx Road

- Location of Phalanx in Monmouth County Inset: Location of county within the state of New Jersey Phalanx (New Jersey) Phalanx (the United States)
- Coordinates: 40°19′03″N 74°08′17″W
- Country: United States
- State: New Jersey
- County: Monmouth
- Township: Colts Neck
- Elevation: 62 ft (19 m)
- Time zone: UTC−05:00 (Eastern (EST))
  - Summer (DST): UTC−04:00 (EDT)
- GNIS feature ID: 879262

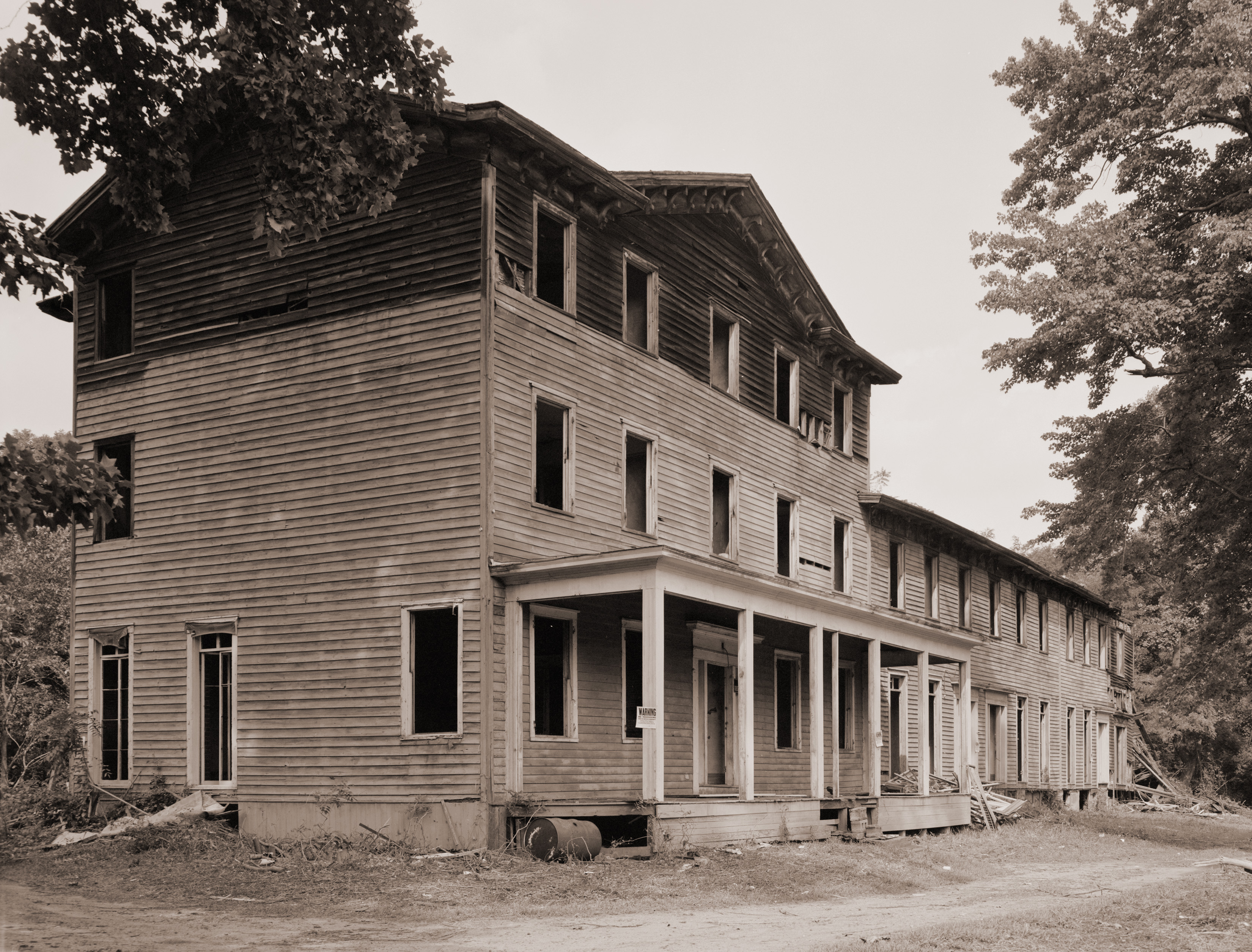
Main residence of the North American Phalanx as it appeared in August 1972, shortly before its destruction by fire in November 1972

Phalanx is an unincorporated community located within Colts Neck Township in Monmouth County, in the U.S. state of New Jersey. It is located near the Swimming River Reservoir and is across from Brookdale Community College in Lincroft. The community is named for the North American Phalanx, a communal agricultural community that existed in the 19th century. The community disbanded in 1854 following a fire but the main residence stood until November 14, 1972 when another fire destroyed it. Homes began to replace the former farmland beginning in the late 1970s and is now the primary composition of the area.
