= Swimming River =

River in Monmouth County, New Jersey

Coordinates: 40.316119°N 74.119434°W

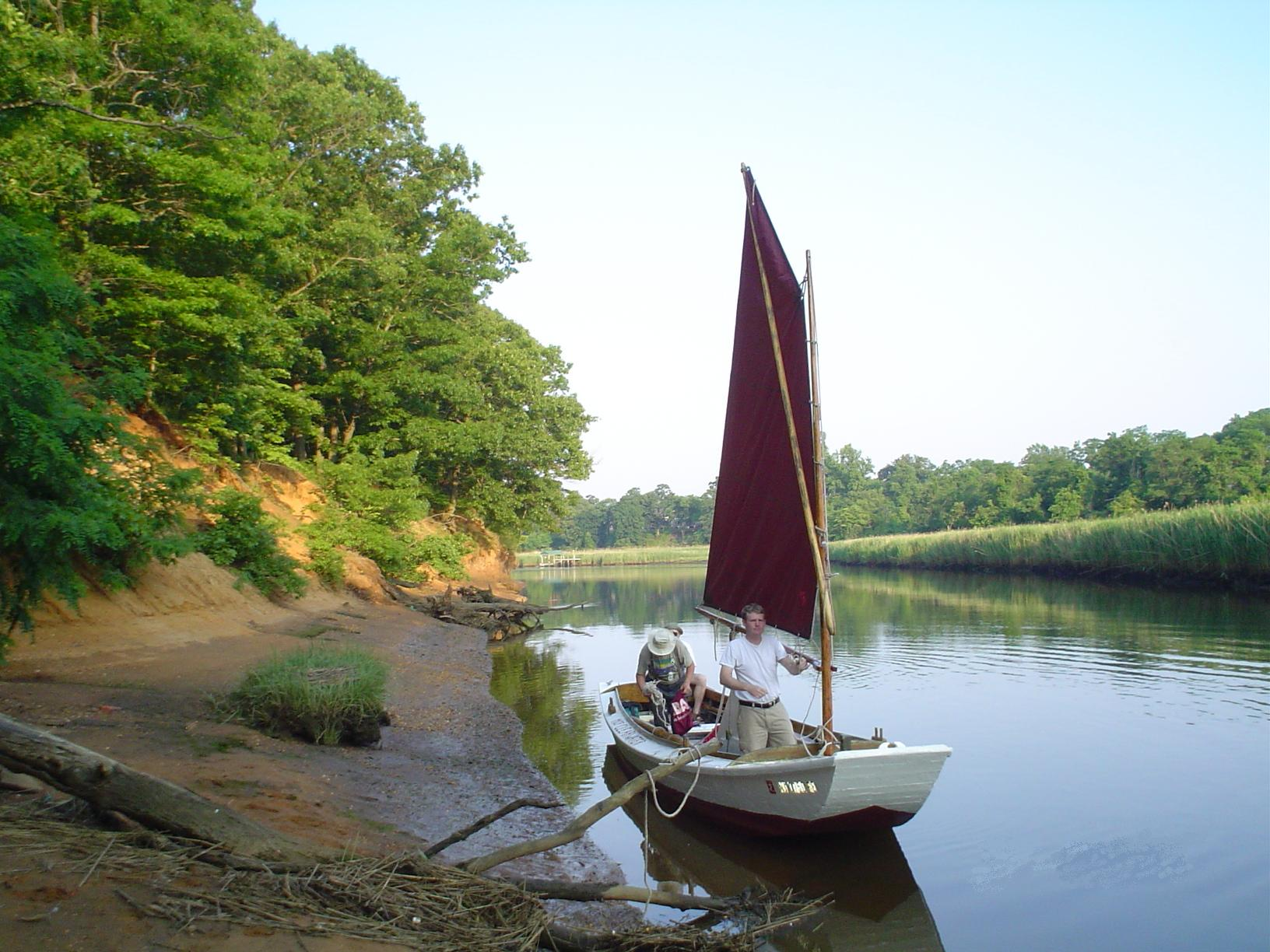
The Swimming River

The Swimming River is an estuary and the name of the Navesink River upstream of Red Bank in Colts Neck and Middletown, located in Monmouth County, New Jersey in the United States.

The Swimming River headwaters upstream of Swimming River Road have been dammed to form the Swimming River Reservoir.

== See also ==
- List of rivers of New Jersey
