= James Taylor (ceramicist) =

English-American ceramicist

- Died: December 31, 1898 (aged 59)
- Occupation: Ceramicist
- Known for: Architectural terra cotta

James Taylor (1839–1898) was an English-born ceramicist who is considered "the father of the American architectural terra cotta industry."

== Biography ==
Taylor was born in England and experienced in architectural terracotta manufacturing there, acting as superintendent of J.M. Blashfield & Company for five years. He emigrated to the United States in 1870 and immediately encountered stubborn misconceptions about terracotta's suitability for use in the United States, with many architects advising him to return to England.

After having no luck finding financing for a new company in New York City, Taylor traveled west and replaced the superintendent of the Chicago Terra Cotta Company. Terracotta manufacture was new to Chicago, but the Great Chicago Fire of 1871 demonstrated the flaws of presumed fireproof materials such as stone and iron and increased demand for brick and clay products. The Chicago Terra Cotta Company had formed a few years earlier but its first superintendent, Giovanni Meli, did not have previous experience producing architectural terra cotta and lacked technical skills.

After his hiring in Chicago, Taylor introduced English methods for preparing clay and producing terracotta, employing muffle kilns in what is believed to be their first use in the United States. Whereas many American architects initially considered terracotta to be a decorative element, Taylor promoted its use for entire building facades.

Taylor's family settled on a farm in Port Monmouth, New Jersey and while there he worked with his friend Edward Adolphus Spring to form Eagleswood Art Pottery, which was one of the first institutes in the United States to offer an education in making ceramics.

In 1878 Taylor moved to Boston to operate the Chicago Terra Cotta Company's new Boston branch and worked there until it closed the next year. By 1880 he had been recruited by another new company; the Boston Terra Cotta Company. His work there allowed him to spend many weekends at home with his family in New Jersey.

While working for the Boston Terra Cotta Company, Taylor helped produce 540 tons of terracotta for use on Orlando Potter's Potter Building in New York City. Potter was so impressed by the use of terracotta that after the building's completion in 1886 he recruited Taylor to help form the New York Architectural Terra-Cotta Company, which became one of the largest manufacturers in the country. Taylor was a proponent of the company's urban location, feeling that unfired clay was cheaper to transport than fired pieces.

Taylor remained with the New York company for several years and helped them achieve success, even acting as a guest modeler and leaving his signature on a terracotta fireplace in the company office. In 1893 he left after his health began to fail and retired to his farm in New Jersey, where he remained until his death in 1898.

== Legacy ==
Taylor was widely considered to be the leading authority on architectural terracotta and many contemporary accounts described him as being always willing to share knowledge and help those looking to improve their product. Surviving letters revealed that he provided lengthy written advice to competitor Gladding, McBean while working at the New York Architectural Terra Cotta Company, and he was likely paid to do so.

Taylor's work in promoting terracotta production within the United States played a key role in establishing its usefulness and suitability for American architecture. Much of the success of the architectural ceramics industry around the turn of the century can be traced to innovations and techniques introduced by Taylor. The Clay-Worker, a trade journal of the time, wrote that "what Mr. Taylor don't know about terra cotta is not worth knowing."
