= Bucks Mill, New Jersey =

Populated place in Monmouth County, New Jersey, US

- Unincorporated community
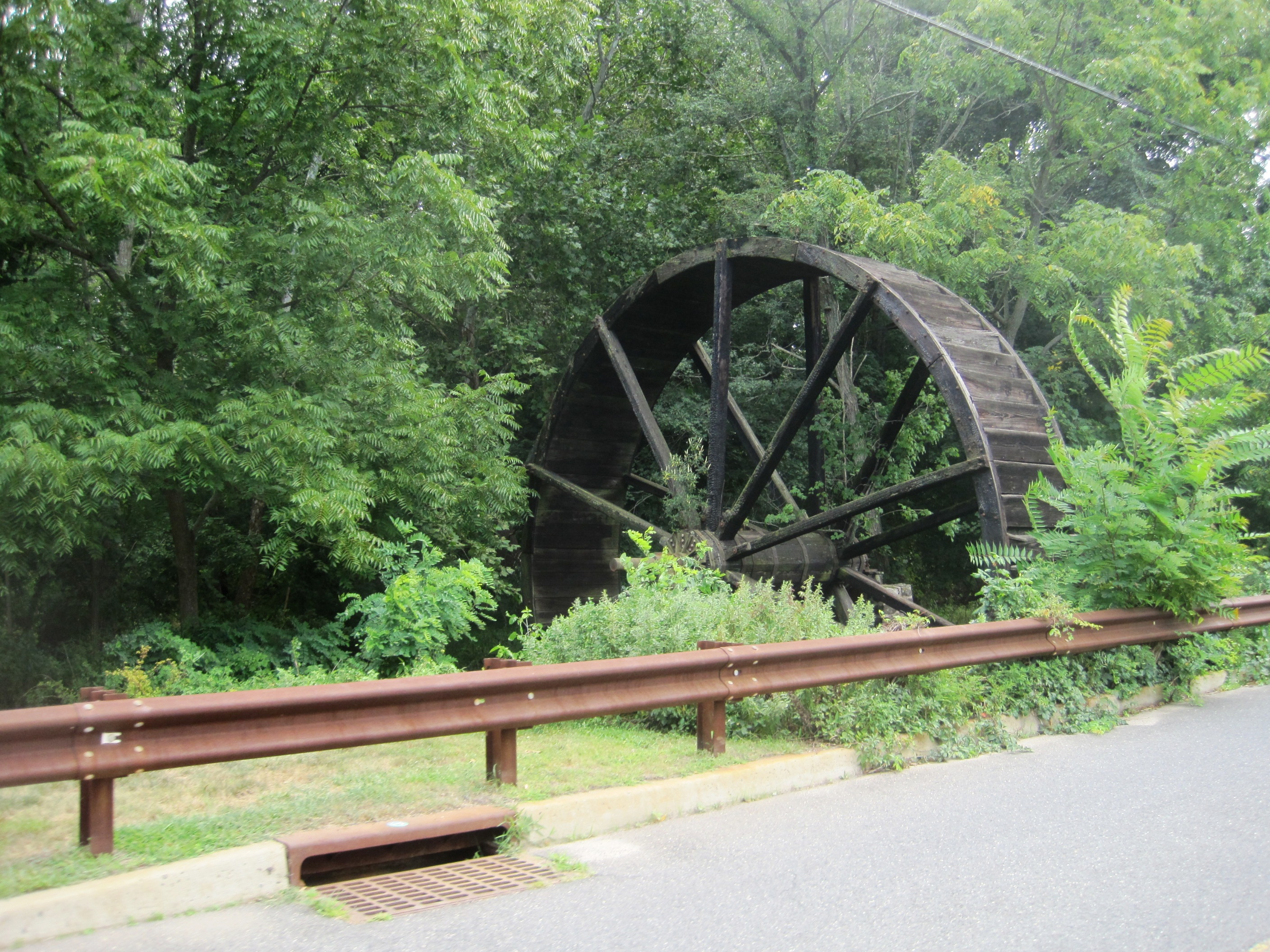
- Remains of the original Bucks Mill

- Location in Monmouth County (Inset: Monmouth County in New Jersey) Bucks Mill (New Jersey) Bucks Mill (the United States)
- Coordinates: 40°17′04″N 74°11′52″W
- Country: United States
- State: New Jersey
- County: Monmouth
- Township: Colts Neck
- Elevation: 95 ft (29 m)
- Time zone: UTC−05:00 (Eastern (EST))
  - Summer (DST): UTC−04:00 (EDT)
- GNIS feature ID: 875008

Bucks Mill is an unincorporated community located within Colts Neck Township, in Monmouth County, in the U.S. state of New Jersey. Bucks Mill Road is the main road that passes north and south through the area; County Route 537 travels to the south of Bucks Mill, near the Hominy Hill Golf Course. Homes, equestrian facility and horse farms, and the township-owned Bucks Mill Recreational Area are located in the area. The settlement is named for Bucks Mill, a gristmill that derived its power from a watermill on the Yellow Brook. Originally built in 1854 and owned for many years by William Buck, Alfred Buck, and Garrett Buck, it was destroyed by a fire on Mischief Night, October 30, 1967. The watermill is the only remaining artifact of the original complex and stands today on the side of Bucks Mill Road.
