= Eagleswood Military Academy =

- George Inness House; Eagleswood Mansion
- U.S. National Register of Historic Places
- New Jersey Register of Historic Places
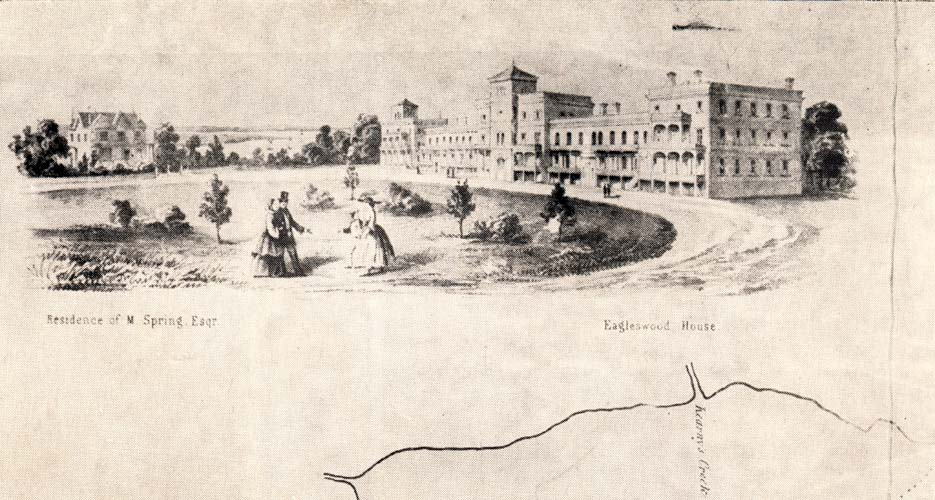

- Location within Middlesex County, New Jersey
- Location: 313 Convery Blvd; Perth Amboy, New Jersey
- Coordinates: 40.51259°N 74.28630°W
- Architectural style: Second Empire
- NRHP reference No.: 79003250
- NJRHP No.: 1893

Significant dates
- Added to NRHP: October 10, 1979
- Designated NJRHP: July 21, 1979

The Eagleswood Military Academy was a private military academy in Perth Amboy, in Middlesex County, New Jersey, United States, which served antebellum educational needs.

The Eagleswood Military Academy was started by Rebecca Spring (1812–1911) and Marcus Spring (1810–1874) in 1861 in the vicinity of the Route 35/Smith Street intersection. The Springs initially started the Raritan Bay Union, as a utopian community in 1853, but the Union closed in 1860.

Rebecca had the bodies of A.D. Stevens and A.E. Hazlett, from John Brown's raid on Harpers Ferry, buried on her property. In 1899 the bodies were disinterred and moved, with the bodies of other raiders (see John Brown's Raiders) to the John Brown Farm State Historic Site, near Lake Placid, New York.

The grounds, approximately 260 acres (110 ha), were recorded in the largest survey conducted by Henry David Thoreau. The Eagleswood Mansion was located on the grounds. The house was listed on the New Jersey Register of Historic Places and the National Register of Historic Places as the George Inness House and was demolished in 1993. George Inness, the American painter, stayed at the home in the 1860s. Edward L. Kemeys (1843–1907) was another artist who spent time in residence at Eagleswood.

The start of the American Civil War caused many of the Academy's teachers to join the war effort and the school was forced to close, having inadequate staff and enrollment to continue its existence. Several years later, the site became the Eagleswood Park Hotel until 1888, when the Eagleswood estate was sold by the Mutual Benefit Life Insurance Company to Calvin Pardee. He built a ceramic tile company on the site.

== Notable students ==
- Ralph Munroe
- Louis Comfort Tiffany

== See also ==
- Raritan Bay Union
- National Register of Historic Places listings in Middlesex County, New Jersey
