= Caneiro family murders =

Murder and arson in New Jersey, US

- Location: Colts Neck, New Jersey, U.S.
- Date: November 20, 2018
- Target: Caneiro family
- Attack type: Mass murder; Mass stabbing; Familicide; Fratricide; shooting; arson
- Weapons: Gun, knife
- Deaths: 4
- Motive: Financial dispute
- Convicted: Paul Caneiro

The Caneiro family murders was a familicide that took place on November 20, 2018, at a mansion home in Colts Neck Township, New Jersey. The four victims were identified by authorities as Keith Caneiro, Jennifer Caneiro, and their two children, Jesse, 11, and Sophia, 8. Firefighters from fire departments all over Monmouth County responded to the massive fire that was lit after the killings. Earlier in the day, firefighters responded to another fire at the house of Paul Caneiro in Ocean Township, New Jersey. Emergency personnel responded to this fire at approximately 5:01 am. In 2026, Paul Caneiro, Keith's brother, was convicted on all counts related to the murders and arson.

== Murders ==
Keith Caneiro's body was found outside of the house with four gunshot wounds to the head and one to the torso. Jennifer's, Jesse's, and Sophia's bodies were found inside the house. Authorities believe that their bodies suffered homicidal violence before they were burned by the fire.

Autopsies later revealed that Jennifer was shot and stabbed to death, while Jesse and Sophia were stabbed repeatedly but had initially survived their wounds, but subsequently died in the house fire from a mix of carbon monoxide poisoning and the stabbings.

== Charges ==
Police took Paul Caneiro into custody on November 21, 2018, without incident. He was charged with one count of aggravated arson on his own home while family members were inside. Caneiro remained incarcerated at the Monmouth County Jail awaiting trial. Authorities have stated that all four people living in Paul's house were able to escape the fire. His initial detention hearing was scheduled for November 28, 2018.

On November 29, 2018, authorities announced that seven more charges had been filed against Paul Caneiro. Caneiro was charged with four counts of first-degree murder, one count of aggravated arson, one count of possession of a firearm for an unlawful purpose, and one count of possession of a knife for an unlawful purpose, all in connection with the Colts Neck incident. Authorities also announced that his detention hearing for the first aggravated arson charge had been postponed until November 30, 2018. In addition, a detention hearing for the new charges was scheduled for December 4, 2018.

In July 2019, charges of insurance fraud were levied.

== Defense ==
Caneiro pleaded not guilty at his brief court appearance for the initial aggravated arson charge on November 30, 2018.

According to an affidavit unsealed Monday, February 25, 2019, Paul Caneiro was being cut off financially from a joint business after funds had gone missing.

In March, attorneys representing Caneiro withdrew from the case after finding what they described as conflicts of interest. He is being represented by a public defender. Hearings on the admissibility of DNA evidence are pending.

== Conviction ==
On February 13, 2026, Paul Caneiro was convicted in the killings. The preliminary sentencing date was set for May 12, 2026. On May 19, he was formally sentenced to life without possibility of parole for his charges.

== See also ==
- Watts family murders - another familicide that took place the same year.
- Pike County massacre
- Torres family massacre - An infamous familicide in New Jersey.
- List family murders - Another infamous familicide in New Jersey.
