= Marcus Spring =

Marcus Spring (October 21, 1810 – August 22, 1874) was, with his wife Rebecca Buffum Spring, the creator of the Raritan Bay Union, a utopian community in Perth Amboy, New Jersey.

== Early life ==
He was born in Northbridge, Massachusetts, in 1810 to Adolphus Spring (1772–1847) and Lydia Taft (1772–1838) and attended Uxbridge Academy. In 1831 he moved to New York City and was a cotton merchant. He married Rebecca Buffum (1812–1911), a wealthy Quaker, on October 16, 1836. The Springs were the traveling companions of feminist author Margaret Fuller during Fuller's tour of Europe in 1846 and 1847.

== Career ==
Around 1850 he became a stockholder in the North American Phalanx in Red Bank, New Jersey. He started the Raritan Bay Union, as a utopian community in 1853. It closed in 1860 and he started the Eagleswood Military Academy in 1861. His son was Edward Adolphus Spring, a sculptor.

== Archive ==
- NJHS: Raritan Bay Union and Eagleswood Military Academy Papers, 1809-1923
