= Colts Neck School District =

School district in Monmouth County, New Jersey, US

Address
- 70 Conover Road Colts Neck Township, Monmouth County, New Jersey, 07722; United States
- Coordinates: 40.317486°N 74.192743°W

District information
- Grades: PreK-8
- Superintendent: MaryJane Garibay
- Business administrator: Vincent S. Marasco
- Schools: 3

Students and staff
- Enrollment: 955 (as of 2020–21)
- Faculty: 116.3 FTEs
- Student–teacher ratio: 8.2:1

Other information
- District Factor Group: I
- Website: www.coltsneckschools.org
Ind.	Per pupil	District spending	Rank (*)	K-8 average	%± vs. average
1A	Total Spending	$22,835	83	$18,891	20.9%
1	Budgetary Cost	18,636	83	14,159	31.6%
2	Classroom Instruction	11,401	83	8,659	31.7%
6	Support Services	3,038	79	2,167	40.2%
8	Administrative Cost	1,773	70	1,547	14.6%
10	Operations & Maintenance	2,155	80	1,612	33.7%
13	Extracurricular Activities	87	38	104	−16.3%
16	Median Teacher Salary	61,125	44	61,136
Data from NJDoE 2014 Taxpayers' Guide to Education Spending. *Of K-8 districts with more than 750 students. Lowest spending=1; Highest=84

The Colts Neck School District is a comprehensive community public school district serving students in pre-kindergarten through eighth grade in Colts Neck Township in Monmouth County, in the U.S. state of New Jersey.

As of the 2020–21 school year, the district, comprising three schools, had an enrollment of 955 students and 116.3 classroom teachers (on an FTE basis), for a student–teacher ratio of 8.2:1.

The district is classified by the New Jersey Department of Education as being in District Factor Group "I", the second-highest of eight groupings. District Factor Groups organize districts statewide to allow comparison by common socioeconomic characteristics of the local districts. From lowest socioeconomic status to highest, the categories are A, B, CD, DE, FG, GH, I and J.

The district includes three schools and an administration building. The three schools are based on a PreK-2, 3–5, and 6-8 grade configurations. The Conover Road Primary School, the newest of the three, serves grades PreK-2. The Conover Road School currently serves grades 3-5 and has a functional capacity of 420 pupils. The Cedar Drive School currently serves grades 6-8 and has a functional capacity of 479 pupils. The district's preschool handicapped program is also housed in the Cedar Drive School.

Students in public school for ninth through twelfth grades attend Colts Neck High School, along with students from portions of Howell Township. The Freehold Regional High School District serves students from Colts Neck Township, Englishtown, Farmingdale, Freehold Borough, Freehold Township, Howell Township, Manalapan Township and Marlboro Township. As of the 2020–21 school year, the high school had an enrollment of 1,316 students and 91.4 classroom teachers (on an FTE basis), for a student–teacher ratio of 14.4:1.

== Schools ==
Schools in the district (with 2020–21 enrollment data from the National Center for Education Statistics) are:

Elementary schools

- Conover Road Primary School with 374 students in grades PreK-2
  - Tricia Barr, principal
- Conover Road Elementary School with 310 students in grades 3–5
  - James Osmond, principal

Middle school

- Cedar Drive Middle School with 324 students in grades 6–8
  - Colin Rigby, principal

== Administration ==
Core members of the district's administration are:

- MaryJane Garibay, superintendent
- Vincent S. Marasco, business administrator and board secretary

== Board of education ==
The district's board of education is comprised of nine members who set policy and oversee the fiscal and educational operation of the district through its administration. As a Type II school district, the board's trustees are elected directly by voters to serve three-year terms of office on a staggered basis, with three seats up for election each year held (since 2012) as part of the November general election. The board appoints a superintendent to oversee the district's day-to-day operations and a business administrator to supervise the business functions of the district.
