= Colts Neck Township, New Jersey =

Township in Monmouth County, New Jersey

- Township
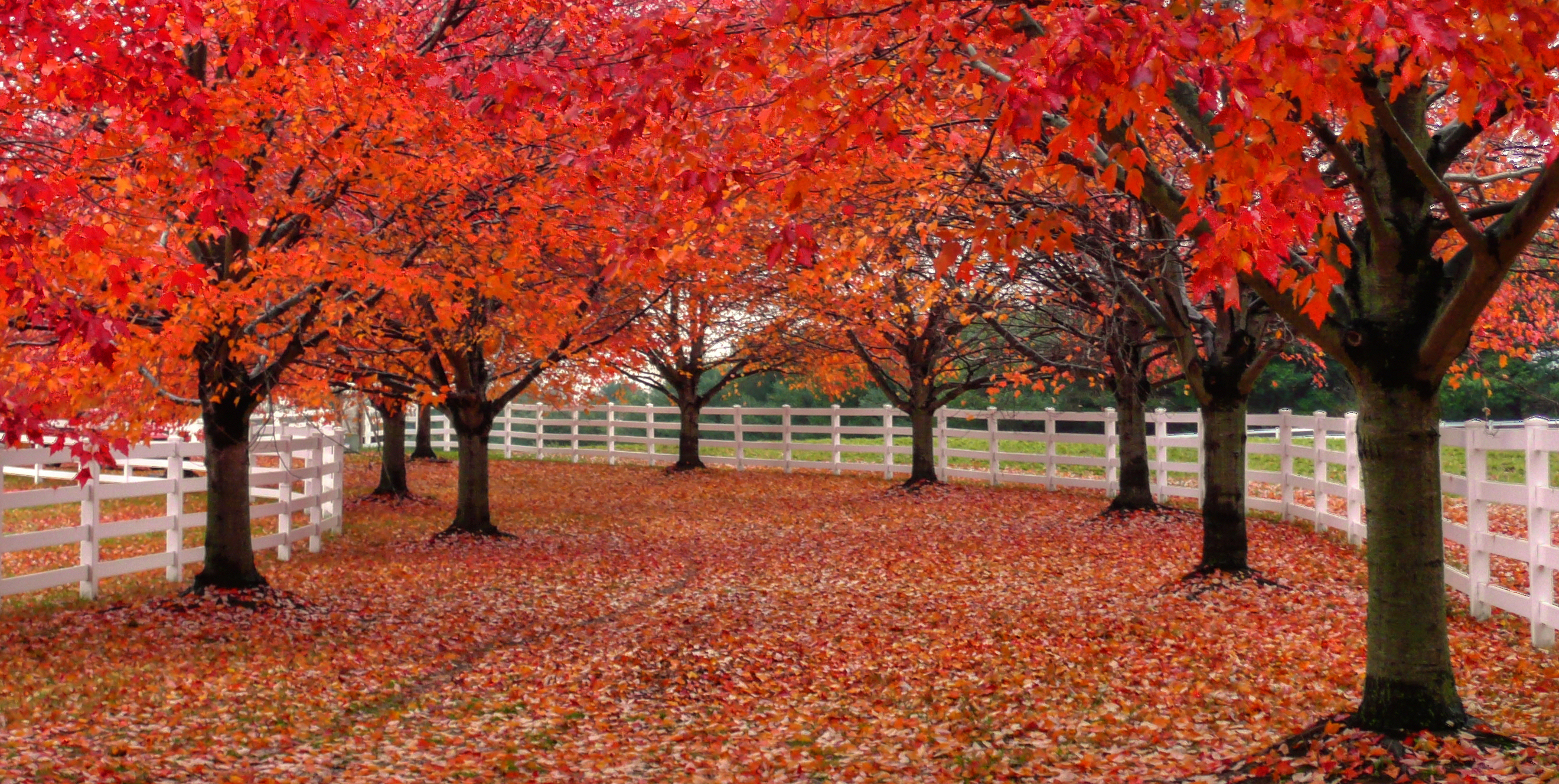
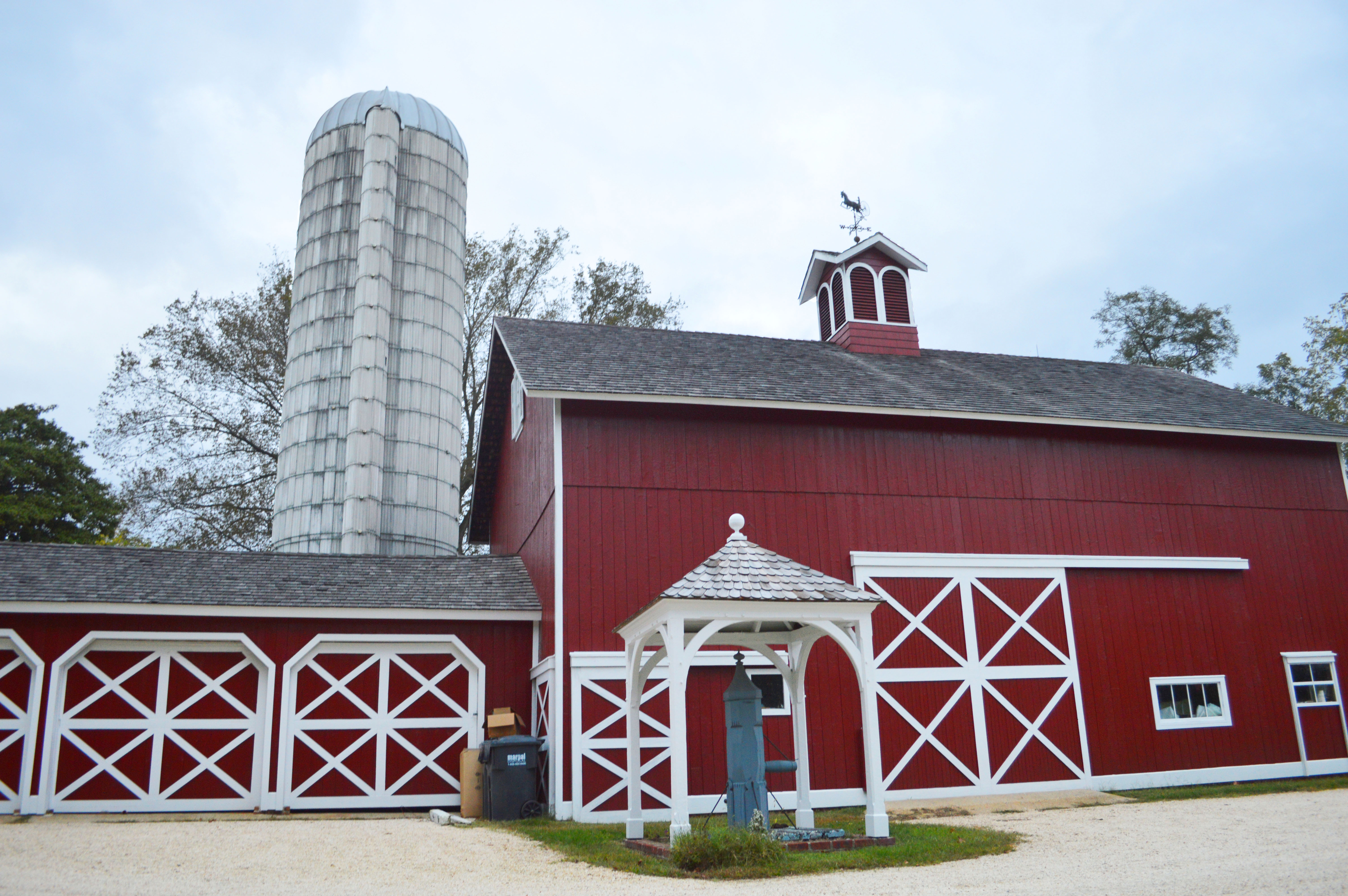
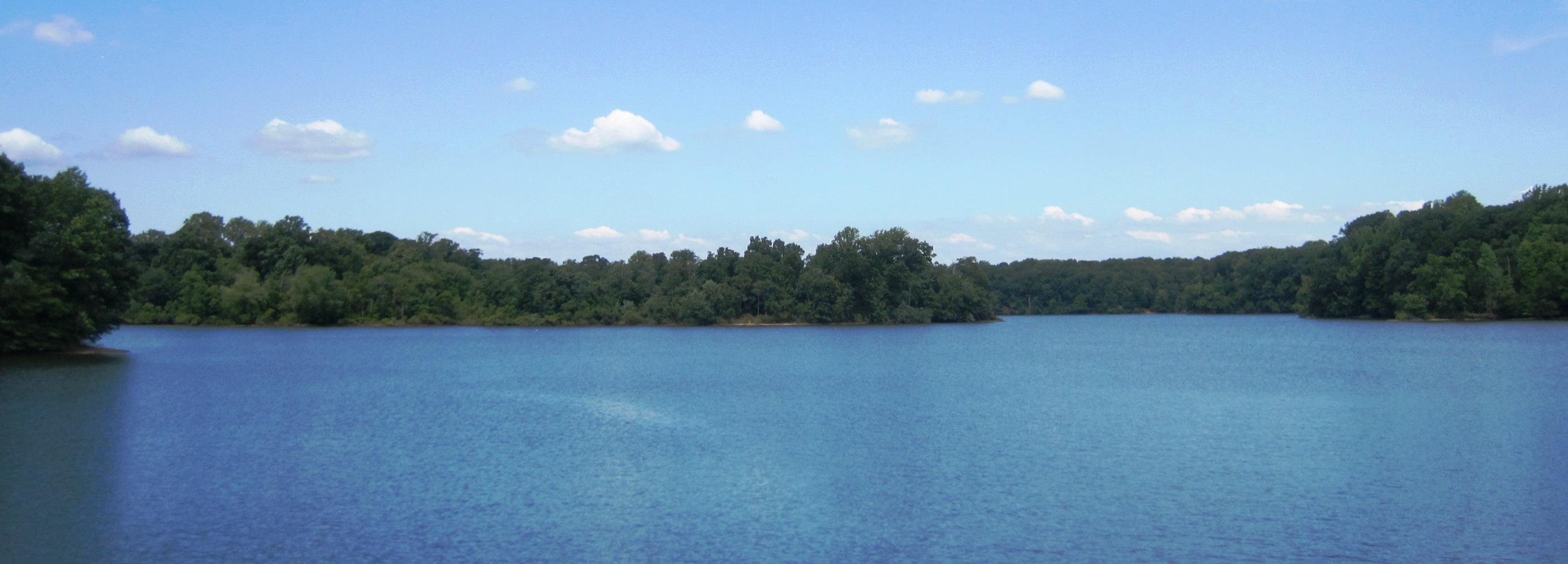
- Business District along Route 34 Fall colors of red maple trees over a fenced path of a farm Neighborhood atop Trump National Golf Club Probasco-Dittmar Farmstead Swimming River Reservoir

- Seal

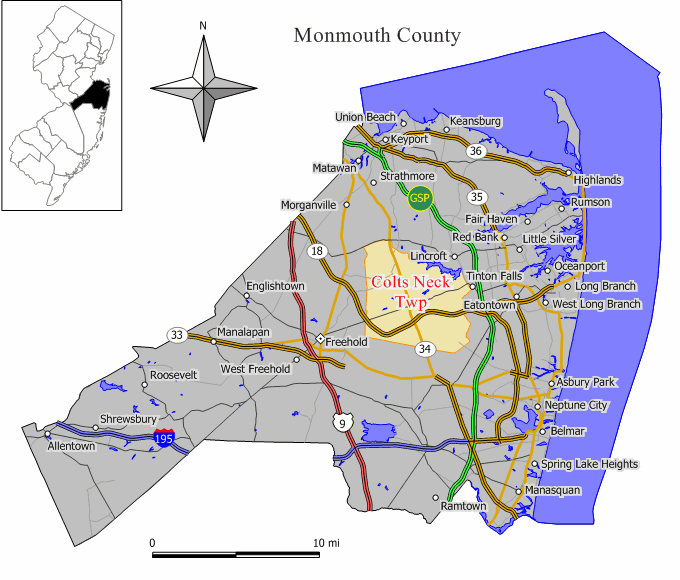
- Location of Colts Neck Township in Monmouth County highlighted in yellow (right). Inset map: Location of Monmouth County in New Jersey highlighted in black (left).

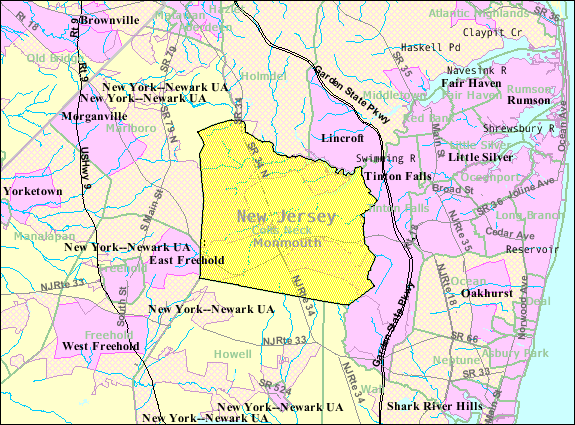
- Census Bureau map of Colts Neck Township, New Jersey

- Location in Monmouth County Location in New Jersey Location in the United States
- Coordinates: 40.293438°N 74.168257°W
- Country: United States
- State: New Jersey
- County: Monmouth
- Incorporated: February 18, 1847 as Atlantic Township
- Renamed: November 6, 1962 as Colts Neck Township

Government
  - Type: Township
  - Body: Township Committee
  - Mayor: Michael Viola (Republican Party, term ends December 31, 2026)
  - Administrator: Kathleen Capristo
  - Municipal clerk: Brian M. O'Malley

Area
  - Total: 31.79 sq mi (82.34 km^{2})
  - Land: 30.71 sq mi (79.55 km^{2})
  - Water: 1.08 sq mi (2.79 km^{2}) 3.38%
  - Rank: 78th of 565 in state 6th of 53 in county
- Elevation: 59 ft (18 m)

Population (2020)
  - Total: 9,957
  - Estimate (2023): 9,906
  - Rank: 248th of 565 in state 19th of 53 in county
  - Density: 324.2/sq mi (125.2/km^{2})
  - Rank: 471st of 565 in state 51st of 53 in county
- Time zone: UTC−05:00 (Eastern (EST))
  - Summer (DST): UTC−04:00 (Eastern (EDT))
- ZIP Code: 07722
- Area code: 732
- FIPS code: 3402514560
- GNIS feature ID: 0882602
- Website: coltsneck.org

Colts Neck Township is a township in Monmouth County, in the U.S. state of New Jersey. It is located in the New York metropolitan area and is a outer ring suburban bedroom community of New York City. As of the 2020 United States census, the township's population was 9,957, a decrease of 185 (−1.8%) from the 2010 census count of 10,142, which in turn reflected a decline of 2,189 (−17.8%) from the 12,331 counted in the 2000 census.

The municipality of Colts Neck Township was initially established by an act of the New Jersey Legislature as Atlantic Township on February 18, 1847, carved from portions of Freehold, Middletown and Shrewsbury townships. The name was changed to "Colts Neck Township" as of November 6, 1962, based on the results of a referendum held that day.

The township has been ranked as one of the state's highest-income communities. Based on data from the American Community Survey for 2013–2017, Colts Neck residents had a median household income of $167,480, ranked fifth in the state among municipalities with more than 10,000 residents, more than double the statewide median of $76,475.

== History ==
Colts Neck Township was first settled in the 17th century and formally established as a township in 1847. Its history spans interactions with Native Americans, colonial settlement, wartime significance, and modern suburban development.

=== Early settlement ===
The area that became Colts Neck was originally inhabited by the Lenni Lenape, part of the Unami or Turtle Clan, who used the land for hunting and crafting wampum from shells gathered near present-day Obre Road. Dutch and English settlers arrived in the late 17th century, drawn by fertile soil, abundant wildlife (including wolves, bears, and panthers), and marl deposits used for fertilizer. Early records note a 1676 sale of 205 acres called 'ColtsNeek' by two Indians, Amesse and Landsand, to Henry Leonard. The Matthews and Van Mater families were among the earliest settlers, establishing farms and mills.

=== Revolutionary War ===
During the Revolutionary War, Colts Neck was a site of conflict due to its proximity to the Battle of Monmouth in 1778. British troops retreating through the township plundered farms and refreshed at the Colts Neck Tavern. Local hero Captain Joshua Huddy, captured by Loyalist Refugees in 1782, was hanged near Sandy Hook, sparking outrage and a notable incident involving General Washington. Michael Field, a Revolutionary soldier, was killed and buried in Colts Neck during a skirmish with the retreating British.

=== 19th century ===
Colts Neck was set off from Shrewsbury, Freehold, and Middletown as Atlantic Township on February 18, 1847, with its first town meeting held at Samuel Laird's hotel on March 9. Early officials included Moderator Thomas G. Haight and Town Clerk Tunis Statesir. The North American Phalanx, a utopian socialist community inspired by Charles Fourier, operated here from 1843 to 1856, marketing the first boxed cereal and leaving a lasting legacy. Churches, schools, and mills, like Bucks Mill, emerged as the township grew.

=== 20th century ===
The township retained its rural character into the 20th century, officially renaming itself Colts Neck Township in 1962. Suburbanization accelerated in the 1980s, transforming farmland into residential estates, though equestrian farms persisted. The Farmland Preservation Committee, established later, has protected nearly 1,000 acres, balancing growth with heritage.

== Community ==
Since the late 20th century, Colts Neck has been a wealthy bedroom community of New York City, located in Central New Jersey within the New York metropolitan area. Many people choose to move to Colts Neck due to its open space and proximity to the Jersey Shore, while still being within commuting distance of New York and North Jersey. The township's strict zoning ordinances have long kept out urban development and chain stores, allowing for locally owned businesses, while still being close to malls, movie theaters, and other amenities in neighboring communities.

The township has a Farmland Preservation Committee which to date has preserved nearly 1,000 acres (400 ha) of land, providing one way in which Colts Neck has been able to prevent large-scale development. The township has strict zoning regulations, and because there is no public water or sewage service, most homes must be built on lots covering a minimum of 2, 5 and 10 acres (4.0 ha).

Originally a farming community, Colts Neck has long been known for its large number of equestrian farms. From the 1950s into the 1970s many of Colts Neck's heavily wooded areas were developed with large colonial and ranch-style houses on acre-sized lots. In the 1980s and continuing into the 2000s much of the town's farm land has been replaced with large houses, mansions and sprawling estates, although a large number of equestrian farms remain. During this time period increasing home prices in northern New Jersey and New York City resulted in large numbers of people moving to central New Jersey, causing real estate prices in Colts Neck and surrounding towns to rise considerably over the course of the two decades. Colts Neck real estate prices remain high despite the economic downturn: as of November 2012, the average listing price of a house was $1,433,112 and the number of home sales is down 41.4% from the previous year.

Many of Colts Neck's residents are professional business people who commute into New York City's financial district, as could be seen in the unusual proportion of the small community who were lost in the September 11 terrorist attacks on the World Trade Center. A memorial garden dedicated to the five members of the community who were lost was created at the municipal center by sculptor Jim Gary, a member of the community who was raised in Colts Neck. The central feature of the memorial garden is his sculpture of metal and stained glass.

In 2018, Colts Neck made national headlines for a 2018 incident in which a man was charged with setting a mansion on fire, which resulted in the death of his brother, sister in law and their two children.

== Geography ==
Aerial view of the Colts Neck Business District

According to the United States Census Bureau, the township had a total area of 31.79 square miles (82.34 km^{2}), including 31.72 square miles (79.55 km^{2}) of land and 1.08 square miles (2.79 km^{2}) of water (3.38%). Colts Neck's geography, with its fertile soil, abundant wildlife, and extensive marl beds along streams like Hop Brook, attracted early settlers. The township's rolling uplands and waterways, including the Yellow Brook and Mine Brook, supported farming and milling, shaping its early development. These natural resources remain evident today, preserved in part through efforts like the Farmland Preservation Committee.

Unincorporated communities, localities and place names located partially or completely within the township include Bucks Mill, Cooks Mills, Hominy Hill, Lippincott, Montrose, Phalanx, Scobeyville, Swimming River and Vanderburg.

The township borders the Monmouth County communities of Freehold Township, Holmdel, Howell, Marlboro, Middletown, Tinton Falls and Wall Township.

== Economy ==
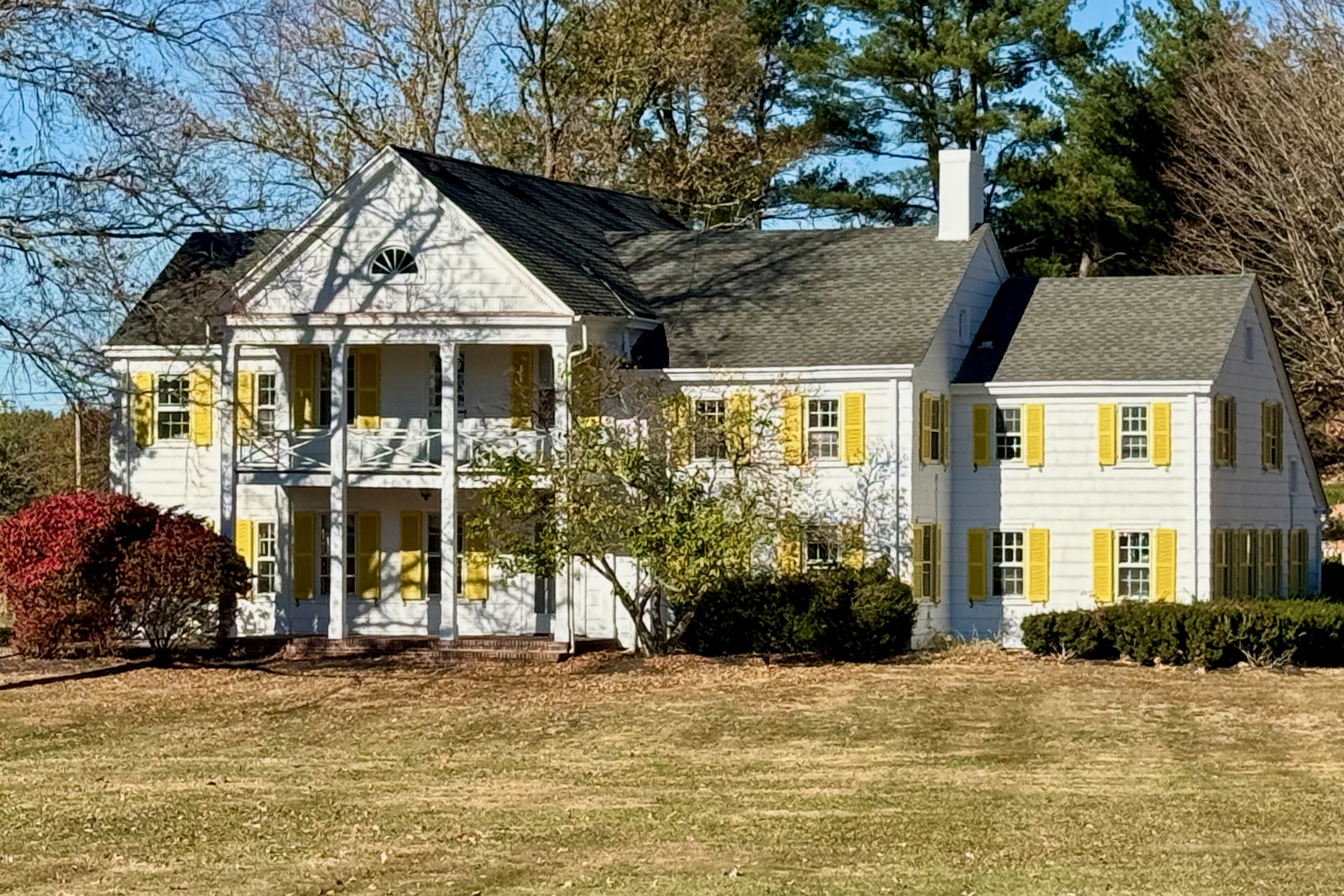
The historic administrative office for Laird & Company. Located in the village of Scobeyville, it is one of the oldest producers of Applejack in the United States (having first received its U.S. distillery license in 1780)

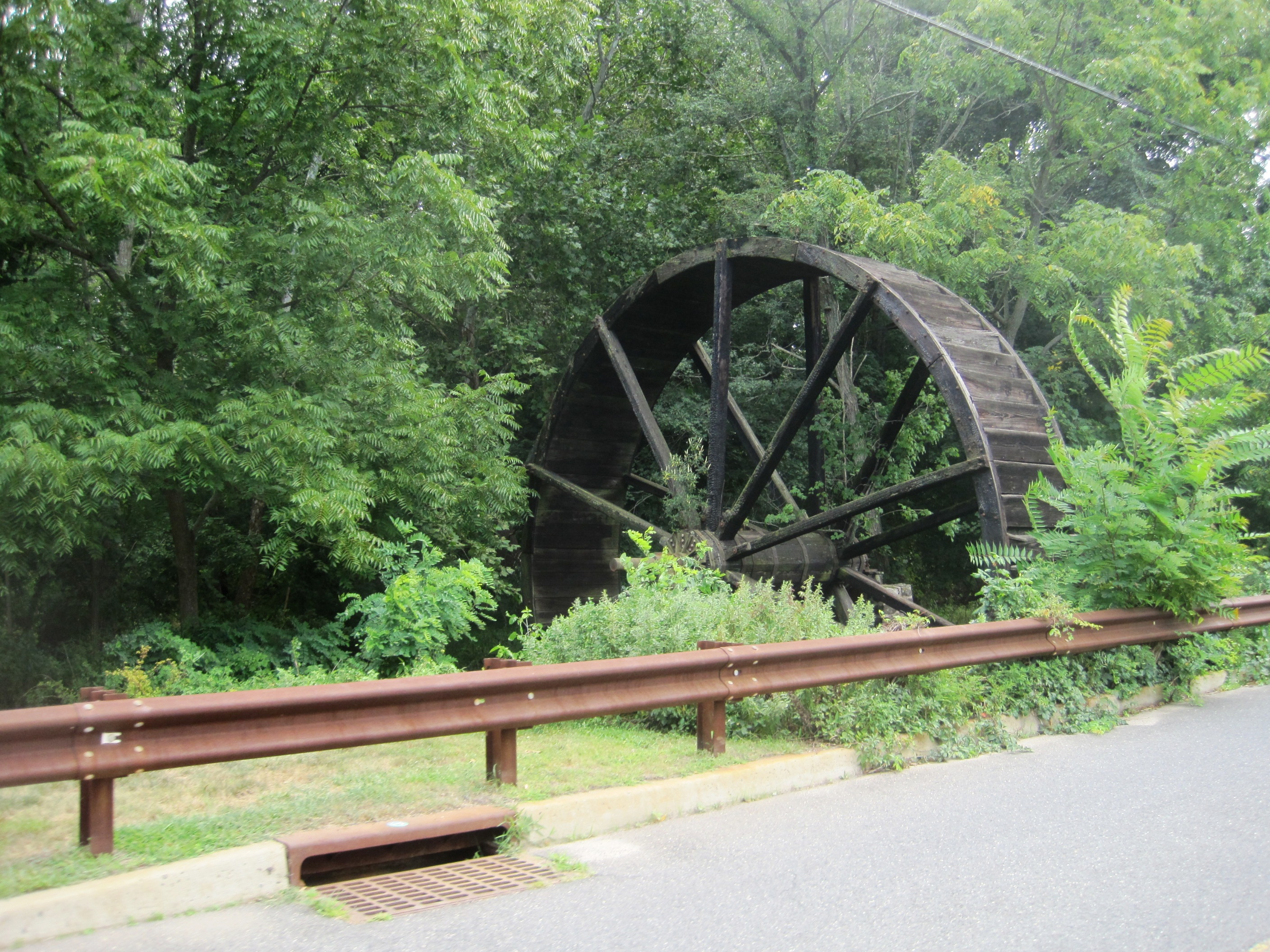
Remains of the original Bucks Mill

Colts Neck's economy historically centered on agriculture, with farming and milling dominant in the 18th and 19th centuries. Bucks Mill, built in 1854, exemplifies this era's grist mills. Snyder's Mill (pre-1806), and Heyer's Mill (c. 1800) were also large milling sites in the township, the latter site of a 1902 flood that killed four workers. The North American Phalanx (1843–1856) introduced innovative industries, including the production of the first boxed cereal.

Laird & Company produces Laird's Applejack at its facility in the Scobeyville section of the township. The only remaining producer of Applejack in the United States, the company received the first U.S. distillery license in 1780 after providing George Washington with its applejack recipe. The distillery operated in Colts Neck until 1850, then moved to Scobeyville after a fire. Since the end of distilling in Colts Neck in 1972, the company has had its apples picked and distilled in Virginia, and then brought north to be aged, blended and bottled at its facility in the township. the company received the first license granted by the United States Department of the Treasury, which was granted in 1780.

The town has been noted for horse breeding since the 1700s; an ad for the stallion "Liberty" appeared in 1780 newspapers. By 1877, township real estate was valued at $1,112,900.

Four JG's Orchards & Vineyards is a winery based in the township, named for the shared initials of the owners and their two children.

== Demographics ==
Historical population
Census	Pop.	Note	%±
1850	1,498		—
1860	1,692		13.0%
1870	1,713		1.2%
1880	1,743		1.8%
1890	1,505		−13.7%
1900	1,410		−6.3%
1910	1,205		−14.5%
1920	1,074		−10.9%
1930	1,241		15.5%
1940	1,177		−5.2%
1950	1,814		54.1%
1960	2,177		20.0%
1970	5,819		167.3%
1980	7,888		35.6%
1990	8,559		8.5%
2000	12,331		44.1%
2010	10,142		−17.8%
2020	9,957		−1.8%
2023 (est.)	9,906		−0.5%
Population sources: 1850–1920 1850–1870; 1850 1870 1880–1890; 1890–1910 1910–1930; 1940–2000 2000; 2010 2020

A 2007 study of New Jersey's highest-income communities shows Colts Neck had a median household income of $166,495, up from $109,190 in 2000, and the average household income was $232,520, which ranked it 16th in the state. The per capita income for the township as of 2007 was $70,781 up from $46,795 in 2000. The average household net worth, not including equity in homes, is $1,088,351 and the average disposable income for a household is $140,507.

=== 2010 census ===
The 2010 United States census counted 10,142 people, 3,277 households, and 2,848 families in the township. The population density was 330.0 per square mile (127.4/km^{2}). There were 3,735 housing units at an average density of 121.5 per square mile (46.9/km^{2}). The racial makeup was 92.17% (9,348) White, 1.67% (169) Black or African American, 0.01% (1) Native American, 4.58% (464) Asian, 0.00% (0) Pacific Islander, 0.36% (37) from other races, and 1.21% (123) from two or more races. Hispanic or Latino of any race were 3.54% (359) of the population.

Of the 3,277 households, 43.1% had children under the age of 18; 77.4% were married couples living together; 7.0% had a female householder with no husband present and 13.1% were non-families. Of all households, 11.0% were made up of individuals and 6.4% had someone living alone who was 65 years of age or older. The average household size was 3.08 and the average family size was 3.33.

28.5% of the population were under the age of 18, 7.1% from 18 to 24, 17.0% from 25 to 44, 33.9% from 45 to 64, and 13.6% who were 65 years of age or older. The median age was 43.6 years. For every 100 females, the population had 96.2 males. For every 100 females ages 18 and older there were 94.5 males.

The Census Bureau's 2006–2010 American Community Survey showed that (in 2010 inflation-adjusted dollars) median household income was $154,491 (with a margin of error of +/− $16,020) and the median family income was $166,909 (+/− $14,315). Males had a median income of $117,917 (+/− $16,897) versus $67,188 (+/− $14,434) for females. The per capita income for the borough was $65,919 (+/− $6,519). About 2.0% of families and 2.5% of the population were below the poverty line, including 1.8% of those under age 18 and 2.3% of those age 65 or over.

=== 2000 census ===
As of the 2000 United States census there were 12,331 people, 3,513 households, and 3,193 families residing in the township. The population density was 392.4 inhabitants per square mile (151.5/km^{2}). There were 3,614 housing units at an average density of 115.0 per square mile (44.4/km^{2}). The racial makeup of the township was 85.51% White, 7.89% African American, 0.23% Native American, 3.63% Asian, 0.01% Pacific Islander, 1.45% from other races, and 1.29% from two or more races. Hispanic or Latino of any race were 4.22% of the population.

There were 3,513 households, out of which 50.1% had children under the age of 18 living with them, 83.1% were married couples living together, 6.1% had a female householder with no husband present, and 9.1% were non-families. 7.5% of all households were made up of individuals, and 2.9% had someone living alone who was 65 years of age or older. The average household size was 3.17 and the average family size was 3.33.

In the township the population was spread out, with 29.2% under the age of 18, 12.1% from 18 to 24, 28.8% from 25 to 44, 21.7% from 45 to 64, and 8.1% who were 65 years of age or older. The median age was 33 years. For every 100 females, there were 109.6 males. For every 100 females age 18 and over, there were 113.4 males.

The median income for a household in the township was $109,190, and the median income for a family was $117,980. Males had a median income of $55,609 versus $38,457 for females. The per capita income for the township was $46,795. 2.8% of the population and 2.2% of families were living below the poverty line, including 2.2% of under eighteens and 2.8% of those over 64.

== Government ==
=== Local government ===
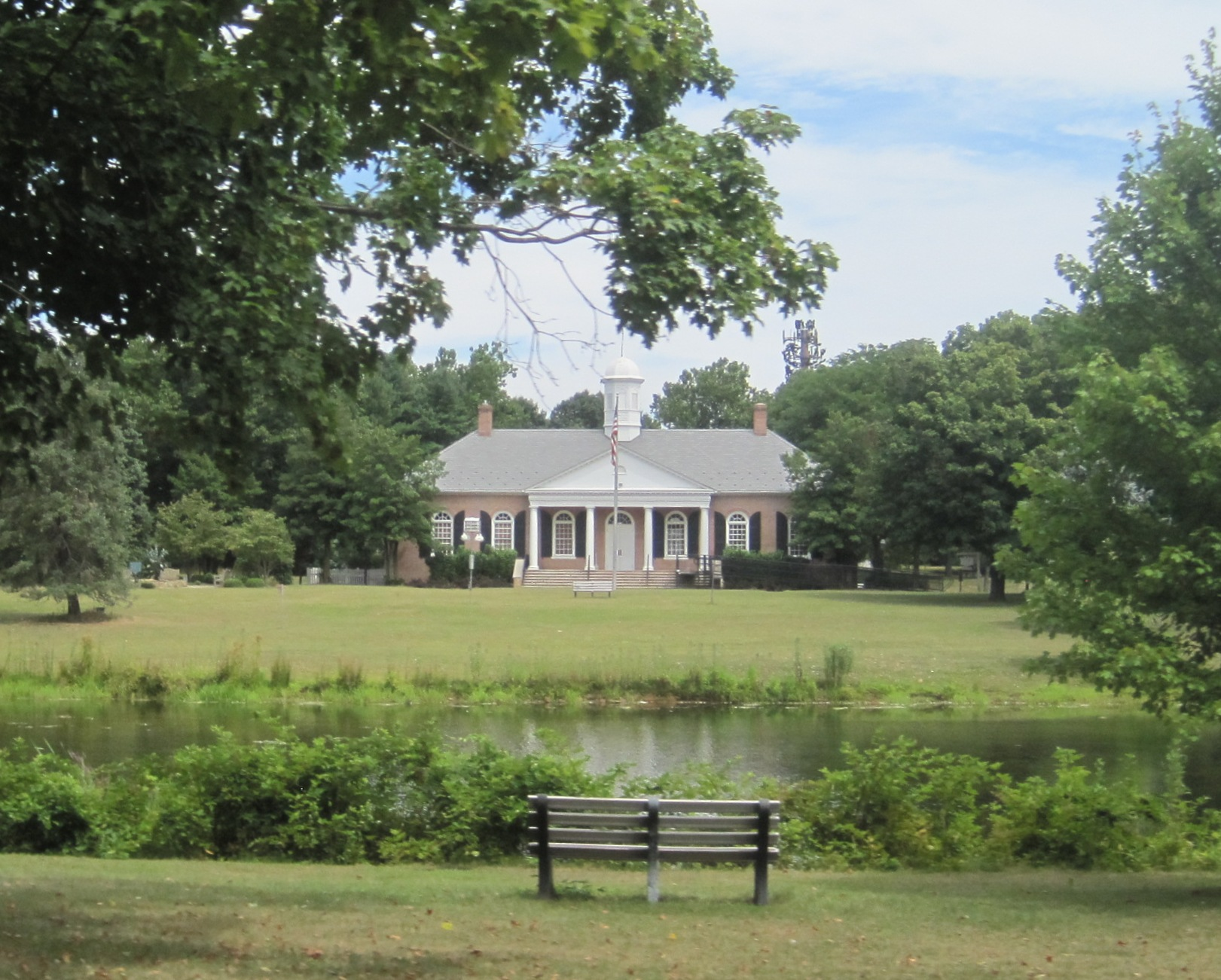
Colts Neck Town Hall

Colts Neck is governed under the Township form of New Jersey municipal government, one of 141 municipalities (of the 564) statewide that use this form, the second-most commonly used form of government in the state. The Township Committee is comprised of five members, who are elected directly by the voters at-large in partisan elections to serve three-year terms of office on a staggered basis, with either one or two seats coming up for election each year as part of the November general election in a three-year cycle. At an annual reorganization meeting, the township committee selects one of its members to serve as mayor and another as deputy mayor, each serving one-year terms.

As of 2026, the members of the Colts Neck Township Committee are Mayor Michael S. Viola (R, term on committee and as mayor ends December 31, 2026), Deputy Mayor Dan Buzzetta (R, term on committee ends 2027; term as deputy mayor ends 2026), Tara Torchia Buss (R, 2026), Frank Rizzuto (R, 2027) and John W. Tobia (R, 2028).

Frank Rizzuto was appointed to fill the seat expiring in December 2018 that had been vacated by Michael Fitzgerald.

The statutory officers of the Colts Neck municipal corporation are Township Administrator Kathleen Capristo, Chief Financial Officer and Tax Collector John Antonides, Township Clerk Brian M. O'Malley, and Tax Assessor William Laird.

=== Federal, state and county representation ===
Colts Neck Township is located in the 4th Congressional District and is part of New Jersey's 11th state legislative district.

For the 119th United States Congress, New Jersey's 4th congressional district is represented by Chris Smith (R, Manchester Township). New Jersey is represented in the United States Senate by Democrats Cory Booker (Newark, term ends 2027) and Andy Kim (Moorestown, term ends 2031).

For the 2026–2027 session, the 11th legislative district of the New Jersey Legislature is represented in the New Jersey Senate by Vin Gopal (D, Long Branch) and in the General Assembly by Margie Donlon (D, Ocean Township) and Luanne Peterpaul (D, Long Branch).

Monmouth County is governed by a Board of County Commissioners composed of five members who are elected at-large to serve three-year terms of office on a staggered basis, with either one or two seats up for election each year as part of the November general election. At an annual reorganization meeting held in the beginning of January, the board selects one of its members to serve as director and another as deputy director.

As of 2026, Monmouth County's Commissioners are Director Thomas A. Arnone (R, Neptune City, 2028),Deputy Director Nick DiRocco (R, Wall Township, 2028), Susan M. Kiley (R, Hazlet Township, 2027), Erik Anderson (R, Shrewsbury, 2026), and Ross F. Licitra (R, Marlboro Township, 2026).

Constitutional officers elected on a countywide basis are Clerk Christine Giordano Hanlon (R, 2030; Ocean Township), Sheriff Shaun Golden (R, 2028; Howell Township) and Surrogate Maureen Raisch (R, 2026; Middletown Township).

=== Politics ===
United States presidential election results for Colts Neck
Year	Republican		Democratic		Third party(ies)	
Year	No.	%	No.	%	No.	%
2024	4,504	69.70%	1,866	28.88%	92	1.42%
2020	4,451	65.09%	2,309	33.77%	78	1.14%
2016	3,819	67.05%	1,718	30.16%	159	2.79%
2012	3,912	72.62%	1,420	26.36%	55	1.02%
2008	3,970	68.48%	1,781	30.72%	46	0.79%
2004	3,929	70.22%	1,629	29.12%	37	0.66%
2000	3,271	63.91%	1,467	28.66%	380	7.42%
1996	2,390	61.89%	1,144	29.62%	328	8.49%
1992	2,400	58.98%	925	22.73%	744	18.28%

As of March 23, 2011, there were a total of 7,303 registered voters in Colts Neck Township, of which 952 (13.0%) were registered as Democrats, 2,805 (38.4%) were registered as Republicans and 3,539 (48.5%) were registered as Unaffiliated. There were 7 voters registered as Libertarians or Greens.

In the 2012 presidential election, Republican Mitt Romney received 72.6% of the vote (3,912 cast), ahead of Democrat Barack Obama with 26.4% (1,420 votes), and other candidates with 1.0% (55 votes), among the 5,423 ballots cast by the township's 7,634 registered voters (36 ballots were spoiled), for a turnout of 71.0%. In the 2008 presidential election, Republican John McCain received 67.8% of the vote (3,970 cast), ahead of Democrat Barack Obama with 30.4% (1,781 votes) and other candidates with 0.8% (46 votes), among the 5,856 ballots cast by the township's 7,581 registered voters, for a turnout of 77.2%. In the 2004 presidential election, Republican George W. Bush received 68.8% of the vote (3,929 ballots cast), outpolling Democrat John Kerry with 28.5% (1,629 votes) and other candidates with 0.5% (37 votes), among the 5,708 ballots cast by the township's 7,200 registered voters, for a turnout percentage of 79.3.

Gubernatorial election results for Colts Neck
Year	Republican		Democratic		Third party(ies)	
Year	No.	%	No.	%	No.	%
2025	3,693	71.54%	1,453	28.15%	16	0.31%
2021	3,543	75.46%	1,130	24.07%	22	0.47%
2017	2,400	71.99%	888	26.63%	46	1.38%
2013	2,630	83.55%	478	15.18%	40	1.27%
2009	3,174	76.96%	741	17.97%	209	5.07%
2005	2,491	70.15%	951	26.78%	109	3.07%

In the 2013 gubernatorial election, Republican Chris Christie received 83.5% of the vote (2,630 cast), ahead of Democrat Barbara Buono with 15.2% (478 votes), and other candidates with 1.3% (40 votes), among the 3,189 ballots cast by the township's 7,624 registered voters (41 ballots were spoiled), for a turnout of 41.8%. In the 2009 gubernatorial election, Republican Chris Christie received 76.7% of the vote (3,174 ballots cast), ahead of Democrat Jon Corzine with 17.9% (741 votes), Independent Chris Daggett with 4.7% (193 votes) and other candidates with 0.4% (16 votes), among the 4,139 ballots cast by the township's 7,433 registered voters, yielding a 55.7% turnout.

United States Senate election results for Colts Neck1
Year	Republican		Democratic		Third party(ies)	
Year	No.	%	No.	%	No.	%
2024	4,391	70.08%	1,800	28.73%	75	1.20%
2018	3,213	70.35%	1,267	27.74%	87	1.90%
2012	3,800	73.63%	1,295	25.09%	66	1.28%
2006	2,446	69.45%	1,010	28.68%	66	1.87%

United States Senate election results for Colts Neck2
Year	Republican		Democratic		Third party(ies)	
Year	No.	%	No.	%	No.	%
2020	4,582	67.95%	2,070	30.70%	91	1.35%
2014	2,087	71.55%	792	27.15%	38	1.30%
2013	1,517	72.14%	572	27.20%	14	0.67%
2008	4,004	72.95%	1,416	25.80%	69	1.26%

== Education ==
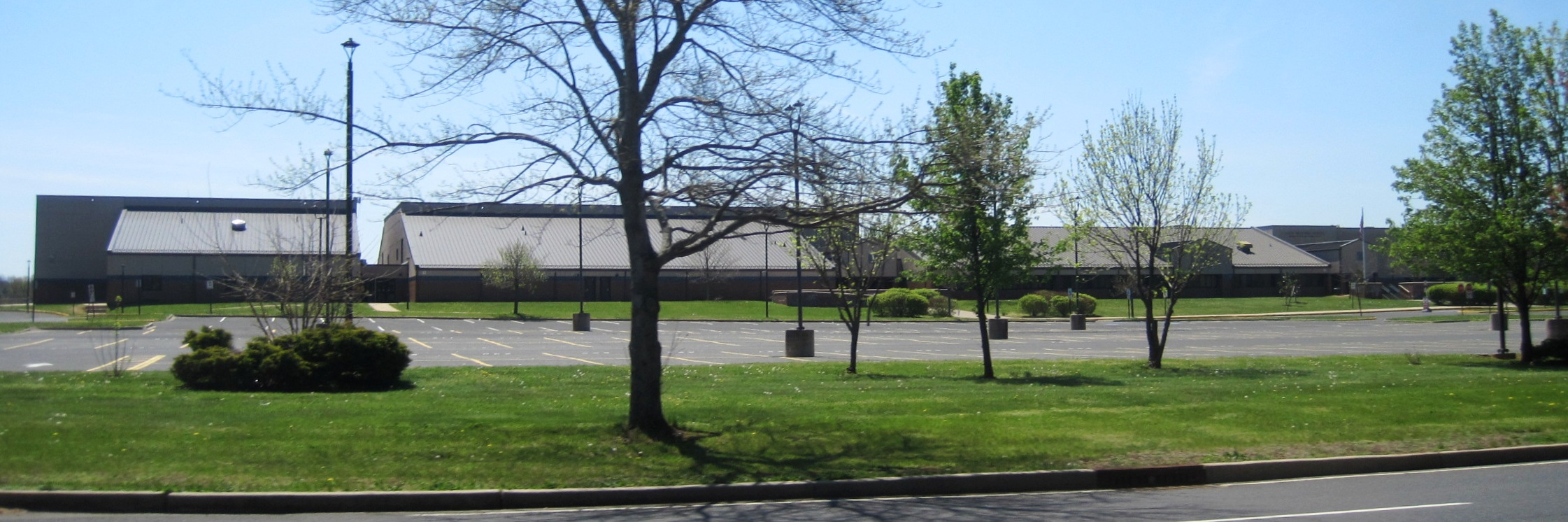
Colts Neck High School on the corner Five Points Road and Colts Neck Road

The first schools emerged between 1813 and 1820 in Colts Neck village, Vanderburg (then Edinburgh), and Scobeyville. By 1873, six one-room schoolhouses served the township, including Montrose School (Civil War-era, now abandoned) and Phalanx School (1844, later converted to a farm kitchen). Atlantic Elementary (1922) consolidated all districts by 1960.

Students in public school attend the Colts Neck School District for pre-kindergarten through eighth grade. As of the 2020–21 school year, the district, comprised of three schools, had an enrollment of 955 students and 116.3 classroom teachers (on an FTE basis), for a student–teacher ratio of 8.2:1. Schools in the district (with 2020–21 enrollment data from the National Center for Education Statistics) are Conover Road Primary School with 374 students in grades PreK-2, Conover Road Elementary School with 310 students in grades 3-5 and Cedar Drive Middle School with 324 students in grades 6–8.

Students in public school for ninth through twelfth grades attend Colts Neck High School, along with students from portions of Howell Township. The Freehold Regional High School District (FRHSD) also serves students from Englishtown, Farmingdale, Freehold Borough, Freehold Township, Howell Township, Manalapan Township and Marlboro Township. As of the 2020–21 school year, the high school had an enrollment of 1,316 students and 91.4 classroom teachers (on an FTE basis), for a student–teacher ratio of 14.4:1. Students may apply to attend one of the district's six specialized learning centers, including the Humanities Learning Center hosted at Howell High School. The FRHSD board of education has nine members, who are elected to three-year terms from each of the constituent districts. Each member is allocated a fraction of a vote that totals to nine points, with Colts Neck Township allocated one member, who has 1.0 votes.

In 1995, about 20% of the township's K–8 population attend private schools. These include Ranney School, Rumson Country Day School and St. Leo the Great School. At the high school level about half of all students attend private schools, including Christian Brothers Academy, Lawrenceville School, Peddie School, Ranney School, Red Bank Catholic High School, Mater Dei High School and St. John Vianney High School.

== Infrastructure ==
=== Transportation ===
Colts Neck's transportation history traces back to Indian trails like the Burlington and Minisink Paths, later adapted by settlers. By the 18th century, roads connected the township to Shrewsbury and Freehold, with the Colts Neck Tavern serving as a stop for stagecoaches and dispatch riders. These early routes evolved into modern highways like Routes 18 and 34.

==== Roads and highways ====
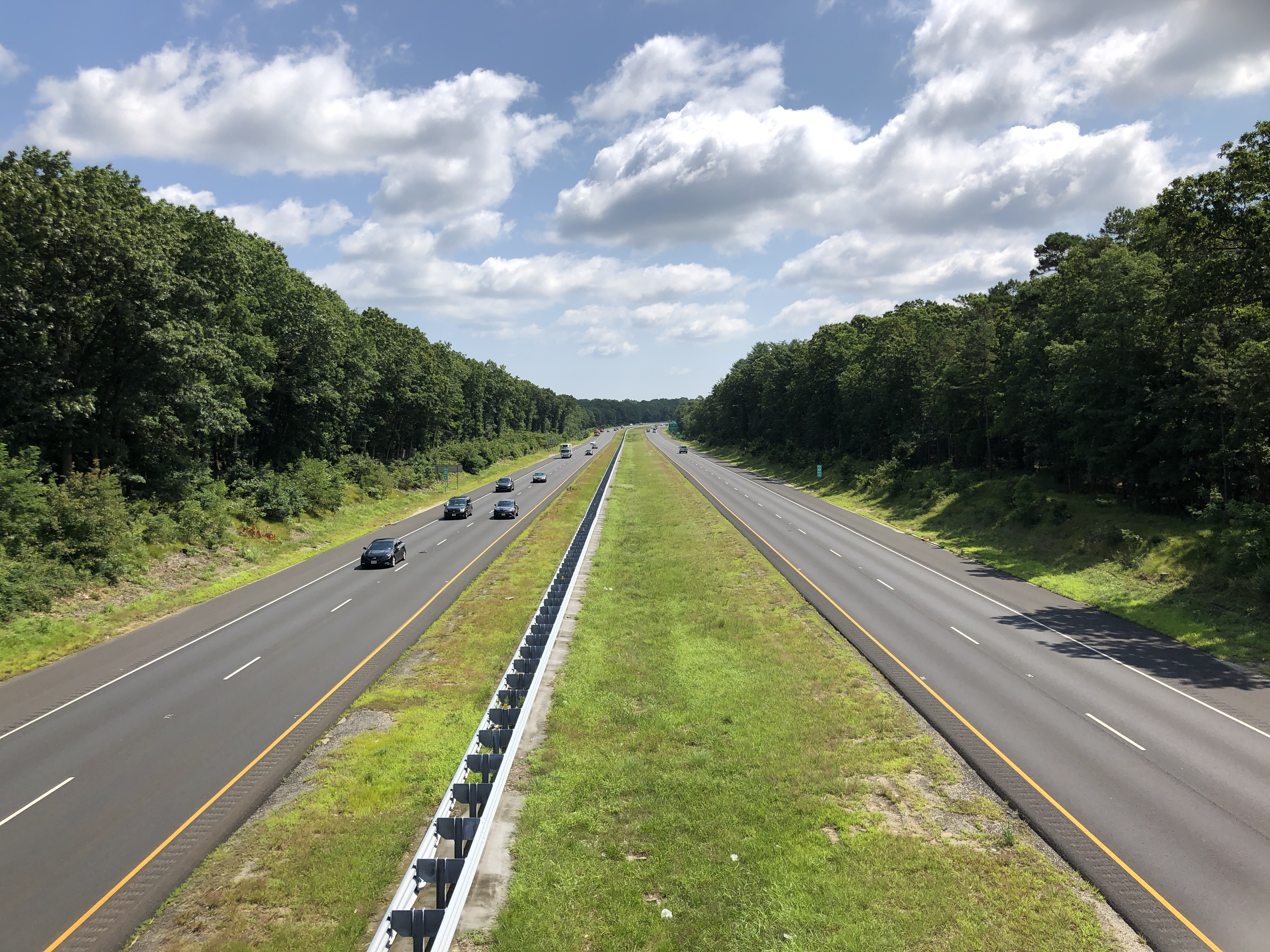
Route 18 southbound in Colts Neck Township

As of May 2010, the township had a total of 132.59 miles (213.38 km) of roadways, of which 103.86 miles (167.15 km) were maintained by the municipality, 15.52 miles (24.98 km) by Monmouth County and 13.21 miles (21.26 km) by the New Jersey Department of Transportation.

Two major state roads pass through the township: Route 18 and Route 34. Major county roads that traverse the township are County Road 520 (along the border) and County Road 537. The Garden State Parkway is accessible in neighboring Holmdel, Middletown, Tinton Falls and Wall Township. I-195 is also outside the township, in neighboring Howell and Wall townships.

==== Public transportation ====
NJ Transit provides local bus service between Freehold Township and Sea Bright on the 838 route.

Ferry service is available through the SeaStreak service in Highlands, a trip that involves about a 25-30 minute drive from the township to reach the departing terminal. SeaStreak offers ferry service to New York City with trips to Pier 11 (on the East River at Wall Street) and East 35th Street in Manhattan. The ferry service also offers seasonal travel, such as to the public beaches on Sandy Hook, baseball games at Yankee Stadium and Citi Field, trips to Broadway matinees, Martha's Vineyard in Massachusetts, college football games at West Point, fall foliage in the Hudson Valley, and to the Macy's Thanksgiving Day Parade, among other excursions.

Monmouth Executive Airport in Wall Township supplies short-distance flights to surrounding areas and is the closest air transportation service. The nearest major commercial airport is Newark Airport, which serves as a major hub for United Airlines and located 30 miles (48 km) north (about 47 minutes drive) from the center of Colts Neck Township.

Colts Neck was also home to Colts Neck Airport, a small general aviation airfield south of the village of Colts Neck that was built in 1938 and closed in 1988.

=== Healthcare ===
Colts Neck Township is served by CentraState Healthcare System. Located in neighboring Freehold Township, the 287-bed hospital is a partner of Atlantic Health System and is affiliated with Rutgers Robert Wood Johnson Medical School. CentraState Healthcare system also provides healthcare through its various family practices in communities across the central New Jersey region. One of those six family practices has an office located in the township.

The next closest regional hospitals to the township are Bayshore Community Hospital, located in nearby Holmdel, and the Old Bridge Division of Raritan Bay Medical Center, located in nearby Old Bridge. The closest major university hospital to the township is Jersey Shore University Medical Center in Neptune, along with Saint Peter's University Hospital and Robert Wood Johnson University Hospital in New Brunswick.

== Notable people ==
People who were born in, residents of, or otherwise closely associated with Colts Neck Township include:

- Vincent Accettola (born 1994), producer and arts administrator, currently serving as managing director of the National Youth Orchestra of China
- Robert E. Brennan (born 1944), entrepreneur who built the penny stock brokerage firm, First Jersey Securities; Brennan was later convicted of fraud and was arrested at his home in Colts Neck in 2001
- Albert Brisbane (1809–1890), social reformer who introduced Fourierism to the U.S. and helped establish the North American Phalanx
- David Bryan (born 1962), of the band Bon Jovi
- Lillian G. Burry, member of the Monmouth County Board of Chosen Freeholders who had served as mayor of Colts Neck
- Caroline Casagrande (born 1976), Assemblywoman for the 12th District of the New Jersey General Assembly
- Wayne Chrebet (born 1973), now-retired wide receiver who spent his career with the New York Jets
- Steven E. Fass, President & CEO of White Mountains Insurance Group
- Jim Gary (1939–2006), sculptor, popularly known for his large, colorful creations of dinosaurs made from discarded automobile parts
- Al Golden (born 1969), professional and college football coach
- Charles Haight (1838–1891), United States congressman who represented New Jersey's 2nd congressional district from 1867 to 1871
- Walt Hameline (born 1951), Director of Athletics and former head football coach at Wagner College
- Pete Harnisch (born 1966), former Major League Baseball right-handed starting pitcher who played for the New York Mets
- Ashley Higginson (born 1989), middle-distance runner who has made the U.S. team for the 2013 World Championships in Athletics in the 3000 meter steeplechase
- Joshua Huddy (1735–1782), Revolutionary War hero captured and hanged by Loyalists, known for his resistance and the subsequent national outcry
- Samuel "Mingo Jack" Johnson (1820–1886), African-American former slave who was falsely accused of rape, brutally beaten and hanged by a mob of white men in Eatontown
- A.J. & Big Justice, father-and-son internet duo
- Joe Klecko (born 1953), former player of the New York Jets
- Stephanie Klemons (born 1982), Broadway performer and choreographer, who was the associate choreographer and original dance captain of the Broadway musical Hamilton
- Queen Latifah (born 1970), rapper and actress
- Jacquie Lee (born 1997), singer came in second place on The Voice season 5
- Pat Light (born 1991), former MLB pitcher
- Heather Locklear (born 1961), actress
- Sarah Mergenthaler (born 1979), member of the 2008 US Olympic Sailing Team who competed in the women's 470
- John Montefusco (born 1950), ex-major league baseball player who played for the New York Yankees
- Eric Munoz (1947–2009), politician who served in the New Jersey General Assembly from May 2001, where he represented the 21st legislative district, until his death
- Jim Nantz (born 1959), lead NFL and NCAA men's basketball commentator for CBS
- Nicole Napolitano (born 1969), reality TV star and former cast member on The Real Housewives of New Jersey alongside her twin sister, Teresa
- Patti Scialfa (born 1953), singer-songwriter, musician and member of the E Street Band
- Bruce Springsteen (born 1949), rock and roll singer-songwriter, who recorded a large part of his album Nebraska in a house he rented in Colts Neck, owns the township's largest equestrian farm and built his home on the farm
- Jon Stewart (born 1962), comedian, writer, producer, director, actor, media critic and television host
- Alec John Such (1951–2022), musician who was best known as a founding member of the rock band Bon Jovi, and as their bass player from 1983 to 1994
- Frankie Tagliaferri (born 1999), professional soccer player who plays as a midfielder for the North Carolina Courage in the National Women's Soccer League
- Hans K. Ziegler (1911–1999), pioneer in the field of communication satellites and the use of photovoltaic solar cells as a power source for satellites
