= Swimming River Reservoir =

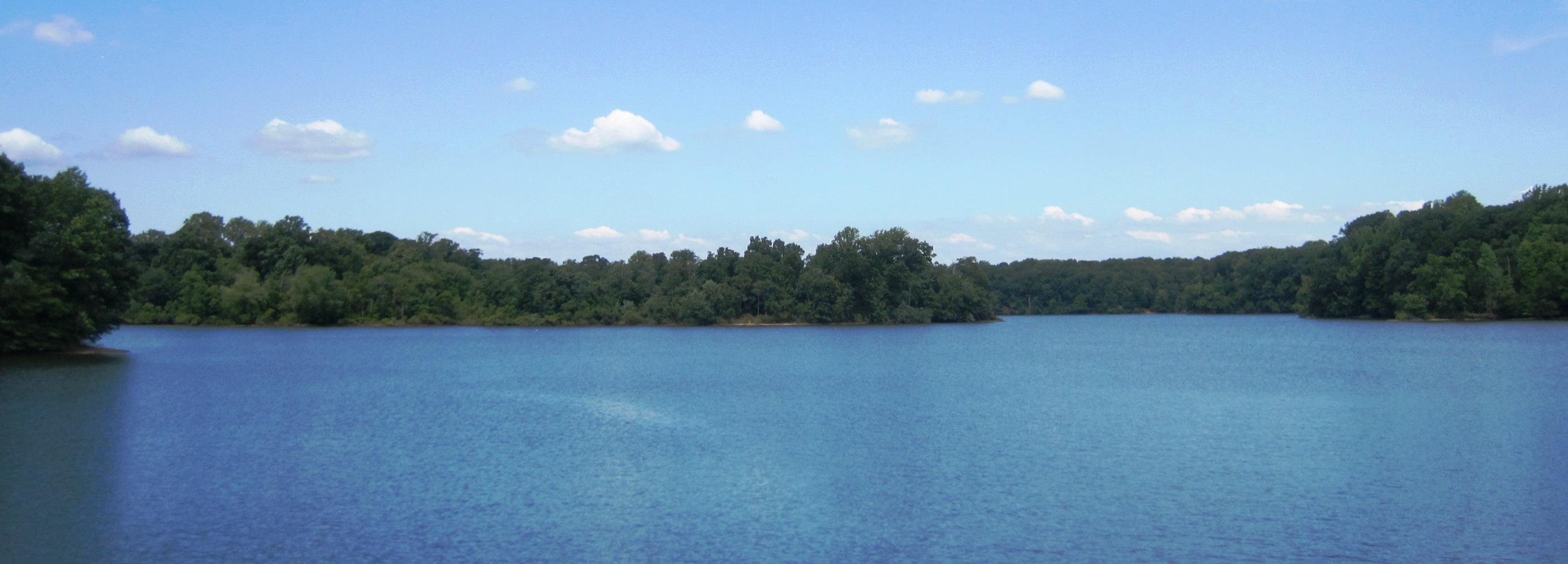
- Looking north from Phalanx Road towards Brookdale Community College

- Location within New Jersey Location within the United States
- Location: Monmouth County, New Jersey
- Coordinates: 40.31889°N 74.11806°W
- Type: Reservoir
- Primary outflows: Swimming River
- Basin countries: United States
- Settlements: Colts Neck, Holmdel, Middletown

The Swimming River Reservoir is a reservoir in Monmouth County, New Jersey. It is located on the border of Colts Neck, Holmdel and Lincroft. The Swimming River ends up in the reservoir, as well as other small tributaries. The reservoir was built in 1901 by the Tintern Water Company to provide fresh water; the dam was replaced in 1958. It is now managed by New Jersey American Water Company and provides drinking water for residents of Monmouth County. The reservoir has a design peak capacity of 159 megalitres per day. Most drainage from Colts Neck empties into the reservoir.

Some local roads that cross over the Swimming River Reservoir include Phalanx Road, Swimming River Road (both in Lincroft), Laird Road, and Long Bridge Road (both in Colts Neck). Brookdale Community College is located on the northern bank of the reservoir. Dorbrook Recreational Area and Thompson Park are also nearby the reservoir.

There are several types of waterfowl and mergansers in the reservoir that migrate during the winter season. Other species include Canada geese, herons, vultures, American coots, swans, and different types of fish, including white perch, yellow perch, and smelts.
