= Raritan Bay Union =

Utopian community in New Jersey

Coordinates: 40.5138°N 74.2853°W

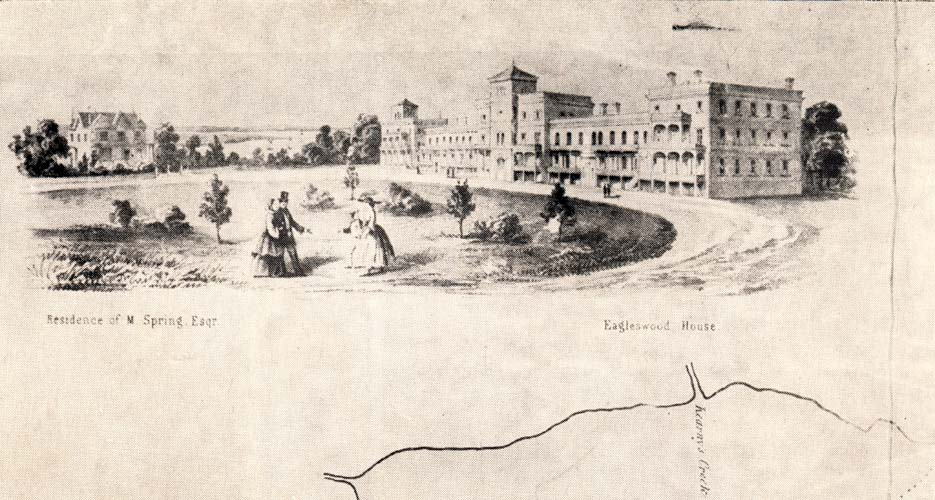
Raritan Bay Union in 1858

The Raritan Bay Union was a utopian community in Perth Amboy, New Jersey, active from 1853 until 1860.

== History ==
Raritan Bay Union was started by Marcus Spring and his wife Rebecca Buffum Spring (1811–1911).

Theodore Dwight Weld was in charge of the connected boarding school, active from 1854 until c. 1861.

Maud Honeyman Green writes, "The Union established a progressive boarding school that was a pioneer in co-education. Girl students were encouraged to speak in public, engage in sports, and act in plays, activities that were frowned upon in other schools. Abolitionists Angelina Grimké and Sarah Moore Grimké were teachers in the school, which was run by Angelina’s husband, Theodore D. Weld. Several other noted reformers came to teach and lecture at the school. The Welds’ school operated until about 1861.

Others who lived at Raritan Bay Union included Charles Kingsley, Caroline Kirkland, and James G. Birney. The early women's rights activist Clarina I. H. Nichols left her two youngest children at Raritan Bay Union when she set out with the New England Emigrant Aid Company for Kansas Territory in 1855.

== See also ==
- North American Phalanx

== Archival material ==
- The New Jersey Historical Society jas papers of the Raritan Bay Union and Eagleswood Military Academy Papers, 1809-1923.
