= Edward Adolphus Spring =

American Sculptor

Edward Adolphus Spring (August 26, 1837 New York City - 1907) was an American sculptor.

== Biography ==
He was the son of Marcus and Rebecca Spring. He studied with Henry K. Brown, John Q. A. Ward, and William Rimmer, and spent several years in study abroad. In 1868 he discovered at Eagleswood, New Jersey, a fine modelling clay, peculiarly suited to terra-cotta work, and in 1877 he established at Perth Amboy Eagleswood Art Pottery. At the National Academy he exhibited a bust of Giuseppe Mazzini in 1873, and several terra-cotta pieces in 1878. He gave lectures on clay modelling in various cities in the United States. After 1880 he was director of the Chautauqua School of Sculpture.
