= Bürkli =

Bürkli may refer to:

- Arnold Bürkli (1833–1894), an engineer from Switzerland
- Georg Konrad Bürkli (1787–1873), a merchant and politician from Switzerland
- Johann Georg Bürkli (1793–1851), a merchant and politician from Switzerland
- Karl Bürkli (1823–1901), a labor movement pioneer and politician from Switzerland
- Konrad Bürkli (1827–1893), a merchant and politician from Switzerland
- Arnold Bürkli Memorial, a sculpture at the Arboretum Zürich which is dedicated to Arnold Bürkli
- Bürkliplatz Zürich, a public square in Zürich named for Arnold Bürkli
- Bürkliterrasse, a section of the Quaianlagen named for Arnold Bürkli
