= Eugen Oswald =

German journalist (1826–1912)

Eugen (Eugene) Oswald
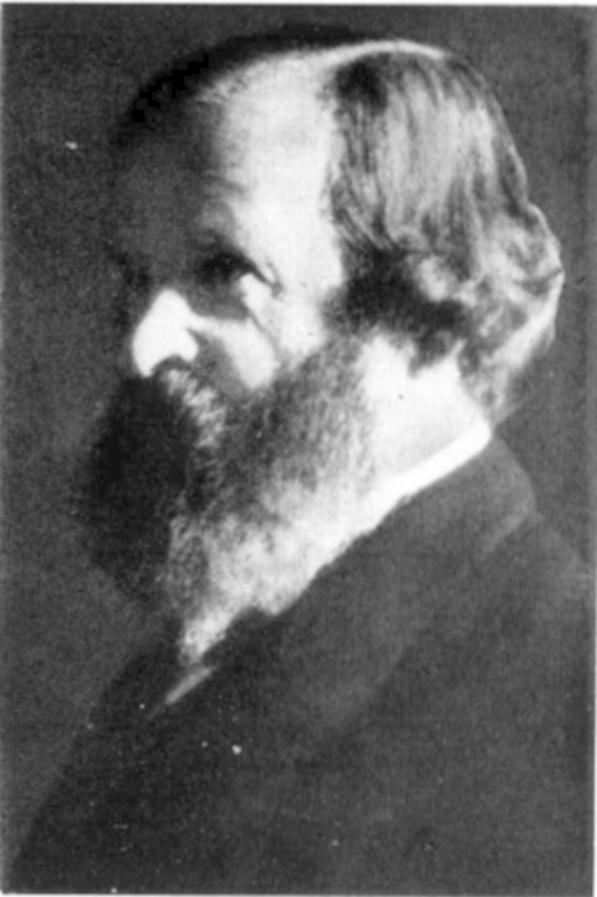
- Born: 16 October 1826; Heidelberg
- Died: 16 October 1912 (aged 86); London
- Occupations: journalist, translator, teacher, philologist

Eugen Oswald (16 October 1826 – 16 October 1912), was a German journalist, translator, teacher and philologist who participated in the German revolutions of 1848–49.

== Biography ==
Oswald was born in Heidelberg. His father August Carl Oswald, publisher for the university and his mother Christiane Brédé. Oswald was the youngest child of the five children of the family. He visited the Kurfürst-Friedrich-Gymnasium Heidelberg. After A level he studied Jurisprudence at the University of Heidelberg. He was a journalist in Germany with democratic beliefs. He participated in the revolutionary movement in Baden in 1848-1849. He published in the „Mannheimer Abendzeitung“. After the defeat of the Baden uprising, Eugen Oswald emigrated to Paris in 1849. Together with Edgar Quinet he wrote for the monthly newspaper „La Liberté de penser“. After Napoleon III French coup d'état of 1851 he was sent to Mazas Prison and wrote there his „Gefängnisbetrachtungen über Frankreich“. He was expelled from France and go to London. The publisher of the „Mannheimer Abendzeitung“ Jean Pierre Grohe and Oswald were condemned of High treason on 24 August 1854 by the Hofgericht Mannheim. Oswald for 4 years House of correction or 2 years and 8 month Solitary confinement. His first job he got at University College School. In England he named himself since 1868 "Eugene Oswald". His translation The Sphere and Duties of Government influenced John Stuart Mill for his book „On Liberty“. 1857 he was employed at the Royal Naval College, Greenwich as an instructor. He taught at the Working Men´s College and was president of the Carlyle Society. 1870/1871 he helped Marx and Engels to defeat the Paris Commune during the Franco-Prussian War. In 1874 he got the Doctor (title) from the University of Göttingen. He wrote for Meyer's Konversations-Lexikon. In 1892, he taught Prince Albert the later King George VI in German language. In 1907, he helped to translate letters of Queen Victoria. He died on October 16, 1912, in London.

He was one of the founders of the English Goethe Society and a friend of Karl Marx and Friedrich Engels.

His wife named Caroline Goodwin. They had one son and two daughters.

In 1941, the Bodleian Library bought a collection of letters written to Eugen Oswald by prominent liberals and socialists.

== Works ==
- L´insurrection badoise dans ses rapports avec la révolution allemande. In: La Liberté de penser. Revue démocratique. No. 30. 15 May 1850, p. 565–581 and No. 33. 15 August 1850. p. 225–248.
- Études sur la Russie. La commune ruale, avenir de la Russie. In: La Liberté de penser. Revue démocratique. No. 40 and 43. Paris 1851.
- Gefängnisbetrachtungen über Frankreich. New York 1852.
- The Sphere and Duties of Government. Translated from the German of Baron Wilhelm von Humboldt by Joseph Coulthard. John Chapman, London 1854. Digitalisat
- A German reading book, with notes. George Routledge, London 1857. Digitalisat
- Ueber Ossian. In: Archiv für das Studium der neueren Sprachen und Literaturen. Ed. by Ludwig Herrig. Georg Westmann, Braunschweig 1857, p. 45–80 and p. 296–402.
- Austria in 1868. Reprinted from the „English Leader. Trübner & Co., London 1868.
- Essays on Early German Books of Courtesy. In: Early English Text Society Extra ser. No. 8. Nicolaus Trübner in Commission, London 1869.
- Karl Bürkli: Direct Legislation by the People, versus representative Government, translated from the original Swiss Pamphlets by Eugene Oswald. Cherry & Fletcher, London 1869.
- Ch., Eug. Oswald: To the People of France and of Germany. London 1870. leaflet
- Ch. Cassal, Eug. Oswald: Peuple Alleman! London 1870. leaflet
- Ch. Cassal, Eug. Oswald: An das französische Volk!! London 1870. leaflet
- A. M. Thiers, en mission extraordinaire, dans les intérêts de la paix, près la Cour de St. James. (Quatrième édition.). London 1870. leaflet
- German Poetry for schools, and the home circle. With English notes, etc. Selected and arranged by Eugene Oswald. T. J. Allman, London 1870.
- To the chairman of the council of the Working Men's College. 1873. Digitalisat
- Walter Savage Landor: Männer und Frauen des Wortes und der That, im Gespräch zusammengeführt. Auswahl und Uebersetzung aus den Imagenery Conversations of literary Men and Statesmen durch Eugen Oswald von Heidelberg. Ferdinand Schönigh, Paderborn 1878.
- Hamlet und kein Ende. Zur Geschichte des Hamlet-Dramas. In: Das Magazin für die Literatur des In und Auslandes. 1881.
- Thomas Carlyle. Ein Lebensbild und Goldkörner aus seinen Werken. Dargestellt, ausgewählt, übertragen durch Eugen Oswald. W. Friedrich, Leipzig 1882.
- Englische Litteratur 1881–1882. In: Meyer´s Konversations-Lexikon. Eine Encyklopädie des Allgemeinen Wissens. Dritte gänzlich umgearb. Auflage, Neunzehnter Band. Jahres–Supplement 1881–1882, Leipzig 1882, p. 274–278.
- Der Positivismus in England. (Aus dem Aprilheft 1884 von „Auf der Höhe“). Leipzig 1884.
- Nora und was aus dem Puppenheim ward. Nach dem Englischen des Walter Besant von Eugen Oswald. Kloß, Hamburg 1891.
- Chamisso. Life poems Faust Schlemihl. In: Publications of the English Goethe Society. Vol. 7.1893, p. 108–143.
- The Browning Birthday Book. With an introduction by Eugene Oswald. M. Ward & Co., London 1897.
- Goethe in England and America. Biography. D. Nutt, London 1899. (=Publications of the English Goethe Society Vol. 8)
  - Goethe in England and America. Biography. Ed. by Ella and Lina Oswald. Alexander Moring, London 1909. (=Publications of the English Goethe Society Vol. 10)
- Goethe commemoration. Edited by Eugene Oswald. London 1900. (=Publications of the English Goethe Society. Vol. 9)
- The legend of fair Helen as told by Homer, Goethe and others. A study. John Murray, London 1905. Digitalisat
- Thomas Carlyle, noch einmal. (Sonderdruck aus Archiv für das Studium der neueren Sprachen und Literaturen). Georg Westermann, Braunschweig 1904.
- Land und Leute in England. Zusammengestellt von Carl Neubert. Neubearbeitet durch Eugen Oswald. 3. bearbeitete Ed. Langenscheidtsche Verlagsbuchhandlung, Berlin-Schöneberg 1906. (=Methode Toussaint. Langenscheidt Sachwörterbücher)
- Reminiscences of a busy life. With Illustrations. Alexander Moring, London 1911.
