= Karl Bürkli =

Swiss labor movement pioneer (1823–1901)

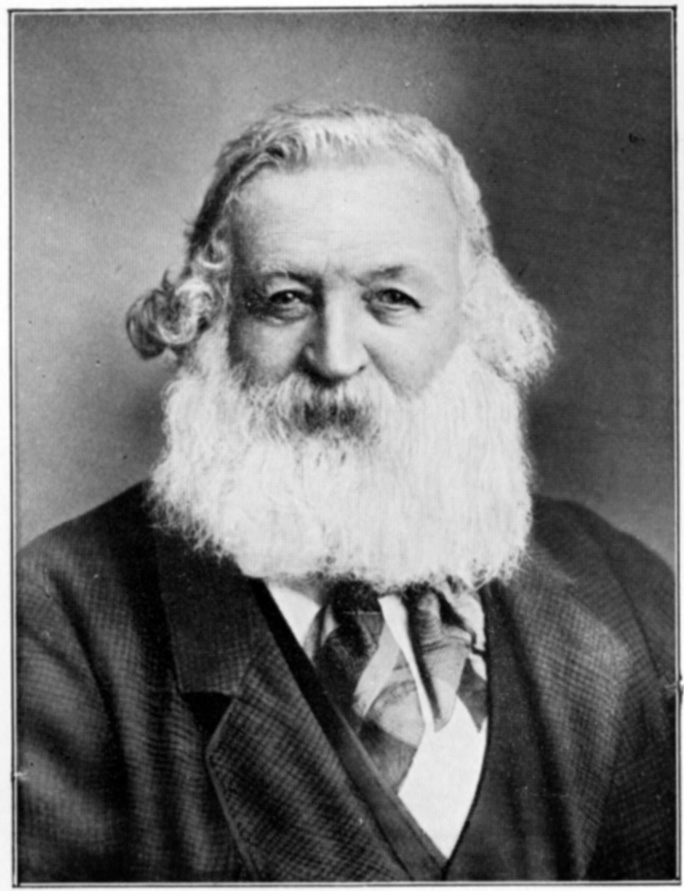
- Bürkli around 1890
- Born: 29 July 1823; Zurich, Switzerland
- Died: 20 October 1901 (aged 78); Mettmenstetten, Switzerland
- Occupations: Cooperative manager, innkeeper, politician
- Parent: Johann Georg Bürkli (father)
- Relatives: Arnold Bürkli (cousin); Konrad Bürkli (cousin); Georg von Wyss (cousin)

Karl Bürkli (29 July 1823 – 20 October 1901) was a Swiss socialist and politician from Zurich and one of the pioneers of the Swiss labor movement. Decisively influenced by the ideas of Charles Fourier, he co-founded the Zurich consumer cooperative in 1851 and in 1855 led a group of Swiss emigrants to La Réunion, Victor Considerant's Fourierist colony in Dallas County, Texas, which he left in early 1856. He was a leading figure in the democratic movement of 1867–1869, founded the Zurich section of the International and was a member of the Cantonal Council.

== Biography ==
Karl Bürkli was the son of Johann Georg Bürkli and a cousin of Arnold Bürkli and of Georg von Wyss. He was also a cousin of Konrad Bürkli. He remained unmarried. He attended the lower grammar school (Untergymnasium) from 1835 to 1839 but left without finishing it, and trained as a tanner from 1839 to 1842. From 1842 to 1848 he traveled as a journeyman. In Paris, in 1845–1847, he came to know the teachings of Charles Fourier, which shaped him decisively.

Bürkli lived in Zurich from 1848 to 1855. From 1851 he opposed the government of Escher together with Johann Jakob Treichler. In articles and translations he spread Fourier's ideas and called for people's banks and exchange banks as well as consumer and producer cooperatives, in order to reform and overcome the capitalist system and to establish a fairer society in a socialist republic. Influenced by Moritz Rittinghausen, he saw direct democracy as the appropriate transitional form. In 1851 Bürkli joined the Grütli Union. That year he co-founded the Zurich consumer cooperative (Konsumverein Zürich), which he managed until 1854, and from 1851 to 1855 he was a member of the Grand Council of Zurich.

From 1854 Bürkli devoted himself to Victor Considerant's plan for a Fourierist colony in Texas: he translated Considerant's prospectus Au Texas into German, published a series of articles promoting the scheme, founded the Schweizer-Phalanx society in Zurich, raised some 150,000 francs for the colonization company (60,000 of it from his own family's fortune) and was named to the colony's governing council under Considerant. In April 1855 he embarked at Bremen at the head of 28 Swiss colonists, who reached La Réunion, near Dallas, in July 1855. Most of the Swiss left the colony within a few months, and Bürkli himself departed in early 1856, a year before its dissolution in January 1857, intending to find more suitable land in Nicaragua. In Central America he served for a time with the forces of the filibuster William Walker, an episode whose circumstances remained disputed; in March 1857 he encountered his former teacher Julius Fröbel in Honduras, who helped him return to the United States. After briefly visiting Considerant's new settlement in western Texas, he drifted through the United States as a laborer until the Zurich consumer cooperative paid for his passage home in the summer of 1858. Back in Zurich he published an extended account of the experiment in the Eidgenössische Zeitung and again managed the consumer cooperative until 1861, when he was defeated by Treichler in his struggle against capitalist developments.

From 1861 to 1887 Bürkli ran a tavern that became a center of opposition currents. He was a leading figure in the democratic movement in 1867–1869 and sat on the Commission of 35 of the constitutional council (Verfassungsrat) of 1868–1869, where he secured state support for cooperatives. He had earlier campaigned for a cantonal bank and for military reforms toward a people's army. He was a member of the Cantonal Council from 1869 to 1878 and from 1882 to 1899, and of the Grand City Council (Grosser Stadtrat) of Zurich from 1866 to 1870 and from 1893 to 1901.

In 1866 Bürkli joined the International. He was the founder of its Zurich section and its president from 1867 to 1876, and he took an active part in the congresses held in Switzerland. From its beginnings he was part of the social democratic labor movement that formed in the last quarter of the 19th century. Besides his earlier demands, he now advocated the introduction of proportional representation and made proposals for the state use of hydropower. He also wrote works on the history of the Old Swiss Confederacy, among them writings against the Winkelried myth, which he criticized from his democratic position.

Bürkli, one of the pioneers of the Swiss labor movement, was not a systematic theorist. His significance lies in spreading the ideas of Fourier and Rittinghausen, which he also supported financially through projects. He thereby brought the traditions of early socialism into the social democratic labor movement and influenced it in an evolutionary, reformist direction. He died in Mettmenstetten on 20 October 1901.

== Bibliography ==
- H.-U. Schiedt, Die Welt neu erfinden: Karl Bürkli (1823–1901) und seine Schriften, 2002 (with bibliography and list of works)
- Urs Hafner, Karl Bürkli. Der Sozialist vom Paradeplatz, 2023
