= Cantagrel =

Cantagrel is a surname of French origin. Notable people with the surname include:

- François Cantagrel (1810–1887), French socialist politician
- Gilles Cantagrel (born 1937), French musicologist, writer, lecturer, and music educator
- René Cantagrel (born 1946), German-French poet, novelist, and painter
