= Vigoureux =

Vigoureux is a surname. Notable people with the surname include:

- Clarisse Vigoureux (1789–1865), French journalist
- Fabrice Le Vigoureux (born 1969), French politician
- Jean Vigoureux (1907–1986), French artist
