= Allyre Bureau =

French politician, writer and journalist

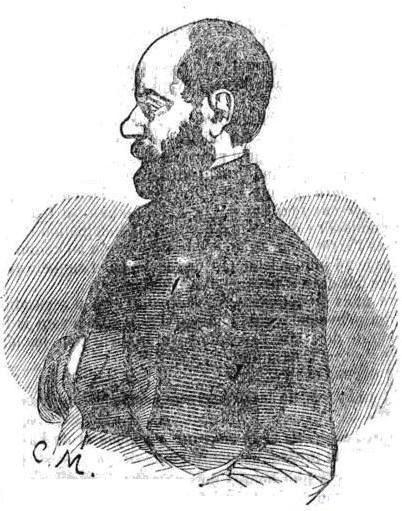
- 1849 drawing of Allyre Bureau
- Born: Allyre Bureau; 16 April 1810; Cherbourg, France
- Died: 31 October 1859; Texas
- Occupations: Politician, writer, journalist, translator, and composer.
- Movement: Fourierism

Allyre Bureau, born April 16, 1810, in Cherbourg and died October 31, 1859, in Texas, was a French politician, writer, journalist, translator, and composer.

== Studies ==
Allyre Bureau studied at the École polytechnique and the Conservatoire de Paris (1833–1834), where he studied violin.

== Political career ==
Attracted to the ideas of Charles Fourier, Bureau left the army and settled in Paris, where he earned a living by giving music lessons and writing songs, often using texts by Romantic poets he knew, such as Théophile Gautier. He was acquainted with major cultural figures such as Victor Hugo, Alexandre Dumas, Gérard de Nerval, Franz Liszt, and Hector Berlioz.

Bureau took part in the 1830 July Revolution as well as the French Revolution of 1848. He stood for elections in 1848, 1849, and 1850. He was arrested during a demonstration on June 13, 1849. Bureau was imprisoned for five months, variously at Palais de la Cité, La Force Prison, and Sainte-Pélagie Prison.

He was for a time President of the "Club des républicains-socialistes."

Bureau then emigrated to the United States, following in the footsteps of his friend Victor Prosper Considerant. He settled there with his wife, three sons, and daughter. He directed the La Réunion (Dallas) colony there from 1857 until his death.

== Musical career ==
In addition to his political interests, Bureau was a talented composer and musician. A friend of the writer Théophile Gautier, he set several of his poems to music, including Barcarolle and La Blanche tombe.

Many of the songs he composed are very popular in Texas, and some were taught in schools. Legend has it that he brought the first piano to the city of Dallas.

== Works ==
L'Art dans la République. Aux artistes musiciens, 1848 Aux citoyens électeurs du département de la Marne. Ce que c'est qu'un phalanstérien, 1848 Plus de conscription, 1849

== Bibliography ==
- Gabrielle Rey, Le Fouriériste Allyre Bureau (1810–1859), La Pensée universitaire, 1962
