= Clarisse Vigoureux =

French woman journalist and writer

Claire Charlotte Dorothée Gauthier, known as Clarisse Vigoureux, (11 June 1789 in Montagney – 13 January 1865 in San Antonio) was a French Fourierist journalist and writer.

== Biography ==
The daughter of a blacksmith, Clarisse Vigoureux was born in Montagney in 1789. She married François Vigoureux, a cloth merchant in Besançon, who poisoned himself in 1817 because of a rumor that he was the cause of the famine then raging in Besançon.

Vigoureux was introduced to Fourierism in 1822 by Just Muiron, a friend of her brother, and she became one of its most active supporters. A friend and frequent correspondent with Charles Fourier himself, she became a journalist, wrote for Fourierist publication “La Phalange” and introduced Victor Considerant to Fourierism in 1824.

In 1834, following a "religious emotion" provoked by Lamennais' book “Paroles d'un Croyant” (“Words of a Believer”), she published “Parole de Providence”, a Fourierist response to the theories of Lamennais, “in which she sees an apology for class struggle and violence that are the antithesis of the Fourierist conception of universal harmony.”

She then became the collaborator of her son-in-law Victor Considerant, who became the undisputed leader of the Societary School after Fourier's death. The June 13 1849 failed insurrection against Louis Napoléon obliged Clarisse and Considerant to go into exile in Belgium. On an invitation by Albert Brisbane and financed by Jean-Baptiste Godin among others, in 1855 they founded the Fourier-inspired colony La Réunion on the Trinity River in Texas.

Although more than 350 European colonists settled in La Réunion, the experiment failed quickly and the population began disperse. Some returned to Europe, others moved out of the area, some died, and some became prominent citizens in and around Dallas, Texas.

After the failure, Clarisse moved with Considerant to a farm in San Antonio, where she died on 13 January 1865. “She was buried in the garden of her San Antonio home. Here Victor would give homage to the woman who had introduced him to his life's work and had supported him and the ideas of Fourier for over 40 years.”
