= La Réunion (Dallas) =

La Réunion, Texas
- Ghost town
- Location within Texas La Réunion (the United States)
- Coordinates: 32°45′33.22″N 96°51′24.8″W
- Country: United States
- State: Texas
- County: Dallas
- Settled: 1854
- Founder: European-American Colonization Society in Texas
- Elevation: 429 ft (131 m)

Population (1856)
  - Total: ~300
- Time zone: UTC-6 (CST)
- FIPS code: 48113
- GNIS feature ID: 2034083

La Réunion was a utopian socialist community formed in 1855 by primarily French, Belgian, and Swiss colonists on the south bank of the Trinity River in central Dallas County, Texas (US). The colony site is a short distance north of Interstate 30 near downtown Dallas. The founder of the community, Victor Prosper Considerant, was a French democratic socialist who directed an international movement based on Fourierism, a set of economic, political, and social beliefs advocated by French philosopher François Marie Charles Fourier. Fourierism subsequently became known as a form of utopian socialism.

Initially, plans for the colony were loosely structured by design as it was Considerant's intent to make it a "communal experiment administered by a system of direct democracy." The crux of the plan was to allow participants to share in profits derived from capital investments and the amount and quality of labor performed. La Réunion existed for only eighteen months with its demise attributable to financial insolvency, a shortage of skilled participants, inclement weather, inability to succeed at farming, and rising costs. Contemporary research indicates that founder and executive director Victor Prosper Considerant was primarily responsible for the failure. Convinced the colony was doomed before arriving, Considerant actively worked against the settlement and economic development of La Reunion, hoping instead to establish a new colony in Uvalde County.

== Geography ==
Founded in 1855 approximately three miles west of the village of Dallas, the town site of La Réunion was located on a limestone bluff overlooking the floodplain of the West Fork of the Trinity River to the north.

The land purchased by the colony consisted of approximately 2000 acres of land was bounded largely by the present day streets of Hampton Rd, Westmoreland Rd, Canada Dr, and Davis St.

== History ==
=== Au Texas ===
In the early 1850s, Victor Considerant was a major figure in the Fourierist movement, which had been suppressed in France after the election of Napoleon III in 1848 and his subsequent coup d'état in 1851.

Forced into exile in Belgium, Considerant accepted an invitation from Arthur Brisbane to tour the United States and traveled widely there in 1852 and 1853. After personally inspecting an area near the three forks of the Trinity River in Texas and being greatly impressed by the climate and opportunities there, he returned to Europe and published a book titled Au Texas advocating for the establishment of a colony in the region.

The colony included families and individuals from Europe, including John Loupot and his wife Rosina Loupot, who were among the settlers at La Réunion.

=== Organization ===
In Au Texas, Considerant described a colonization company that would supervise the initial stages of settlement, and which would serve as a center from which different social experiments could be tried. Considerant was dubious that a Fourierist colony could succeed immediately under frontier conditions and in a foreign country.

Initially, plans for the colony were loosely structured as Considerant intended to make it a "communal experiment administered by a system of direct democracy." Many of the colonists at La Réunion, meanwhile, were eager to put the communal practices described by Fourier into action.

The crux of the plan was to allow participants to share in profits derived from capital investments and the amount and quality of labor performed.

The Societe de Colonisation Europeo Americaine was established on September 26, 1854 as a joint-stock company; the equivalent of $1 million worth of shares were sold to a range of investors including Jean-Baptiste-André Godin, promising six percent interest per year. As director, Considerant was guaranteed five-sixteenths of all stock issued. The Phalange was not to be fully communistic, but co-operative—with divisions of profit going in proportion to labor, capital and talent.

=== Establishment ===
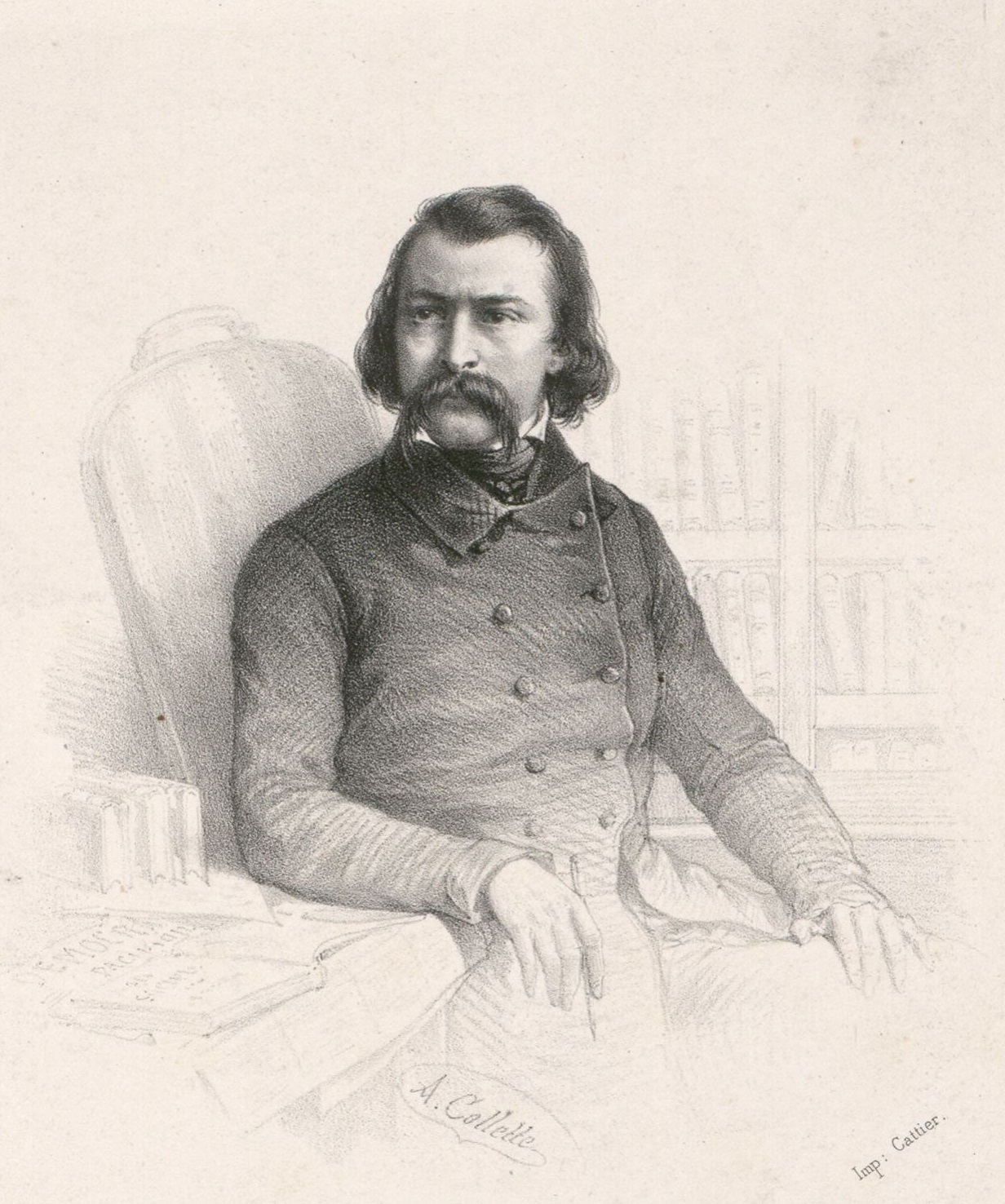
Victor Prosper Considerant, founder and first director of the colony

Advance agent François Cantagrel was sent ahead to purchase land, departing from Belgium October 3. When he arrived in Texas, he found that the abandoned Fort Worth, which Considerant had hoped to use as a base for the colony, was no longer available.

After a significant search, Cantagrel purchased in March 1920 acres of land for the colony $10270. The land included both the limestone cliffs where the townsite would be built as well as Trinity River bottom lands with rich soil for farming.

Approximately 200 colonists arrived by ship near present-day Houston. They walked overland to the site of their new colony approximately 250 miles (400 km) northward, with their possessions hauled by ox carts, and arrived on April 22, 1855.

The town of Dallas had about 400 inhabitants at the time. The addition of the European colonists nearly doubled the population. The new arrivals spoke a different language from the settlers, believed in a different system of government and Catholic faith, and brought with them skills that the existing farmers did not possess. The watchmaking, weaving, brewing and storekeeping skills of the new colonists were ill-suited to the establishment of a colony, since they lacked the experience and ability to produce food for themselves.

Although the colonists cultivated wheat and vegetables, they did not produce enough for their needs or in time; their biggest handicap was the uncooperative weather of Texas. A blizzard in May 1856 destroyed the colony's crops and covered the Trinity River with ice. That summer the Texas heat created drought conditions, and what was left of the crops became eaten by an invasion of grasshoppers.

=== Struggles ===
Considerant met several disappointments upon his return to the United States in February 1855. The Texas legislature had largely discontinued the headright land grant system instead reserving large sections of land for a prospective transcontinental railroad. Additionally, the Know Nothing Party—a populist movement opposed to foreign immigration had suddenly emerged as a significant national force. However, most distressing to Considerant was the news that Savardan and Burkli had set sail with groups including women, children, and old men—dashing his hopes for a pioneer group to lay the foundation for more general settlement.

On July 6, 1856, Cantagrel resigned his position in the colony after months of conflict with Considerant, particularly over his failure to compensate colonists who had chosen to leave the community. Considerant then worked out a deal with the colonists over withheld wages, but on the morning of July 8, before the agreement was signed, Considerant was found to have fled the colony, never to return.

=== Dissolution ===
On January 28, 1857, Allyre Bureau, founding partner and director since Considerant's resignation, gave formal notice of the colony's dissolution. The last La Réunion house collapsed in the 1930s. By 1954, the city of Dallas annexed the land that was once La Réunion.

== Legacy ==
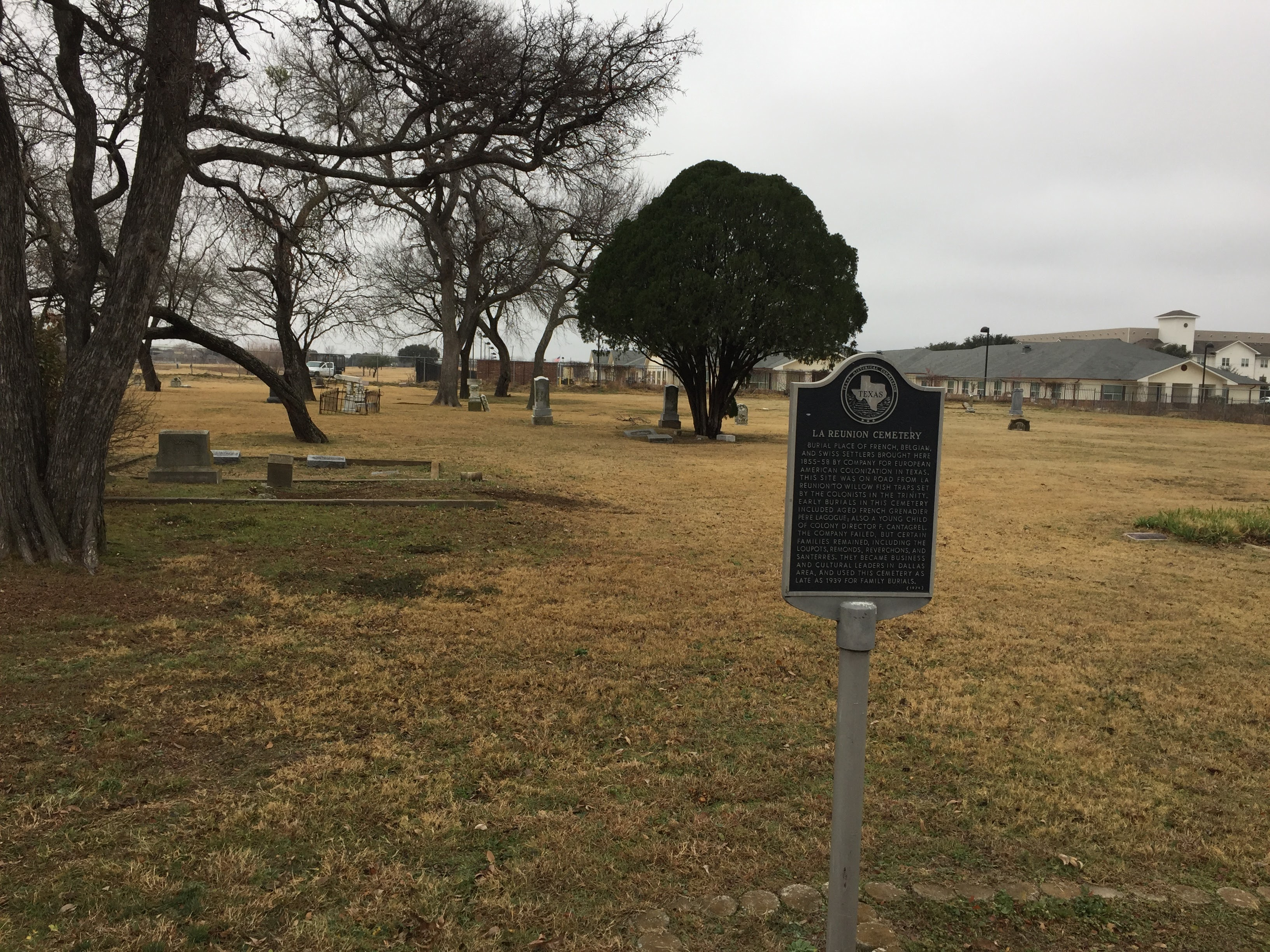
La Reunion Cemetery historical marker in West Dallas

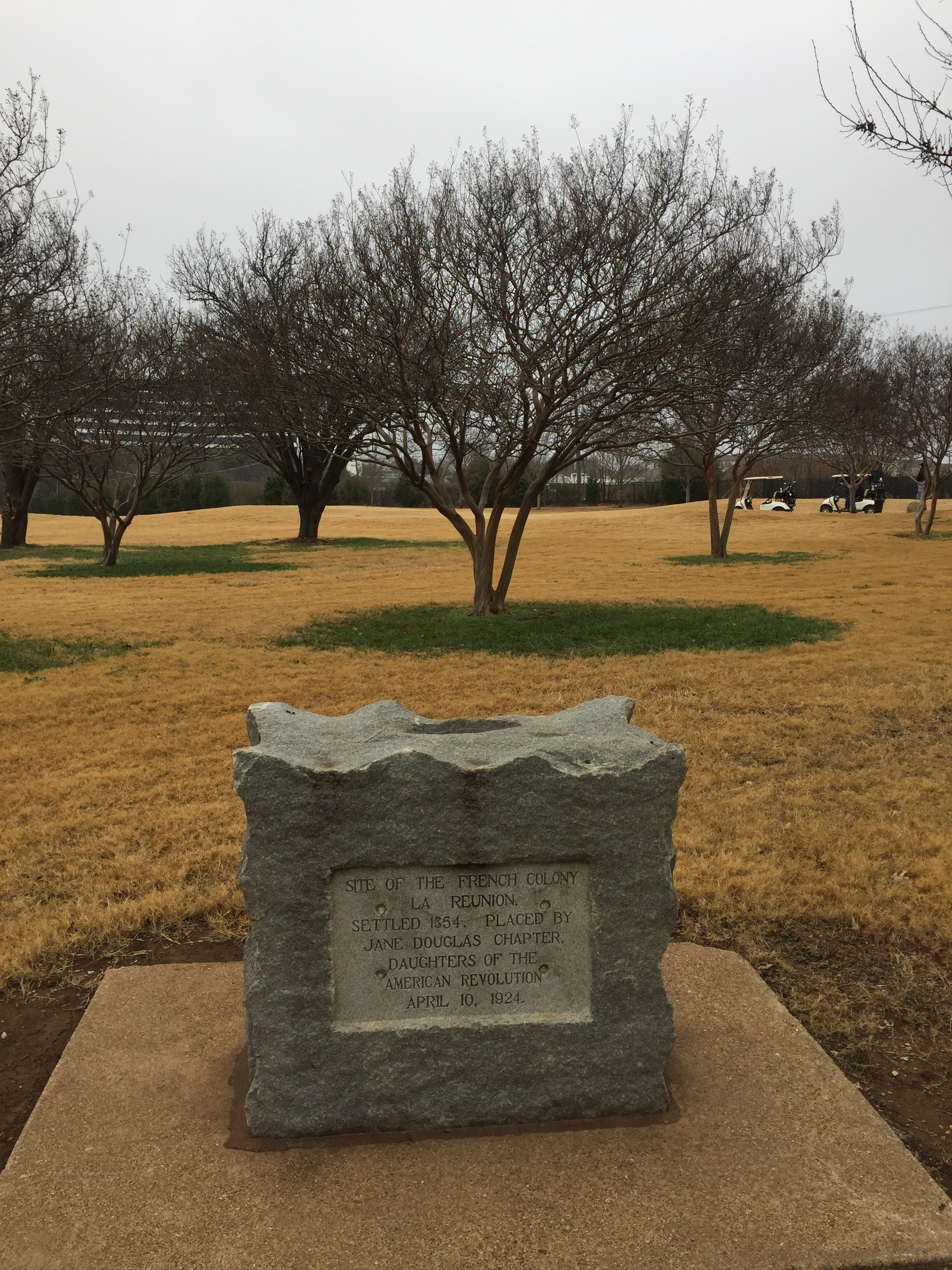
La Reunion historical marker on a golf course in Oak Cliff

Many colonists went on to become prominent citizens in Dallas or Texas after the dissolution of the colony. Notable naturalist Julien Reverchon played an important role in documenting the flora of the American West. Reverchon was also a celebrated professor of botany at Baylor University College of Medicine and Pharmacy in Dallas. Swiss colonist Benjamin Long was twice mayor of Dallas and also recruited a significant number of his countrymen to immigrate to the city.

Colonists Henry Boll and Jacob Nussbaumer were very early settlers and significant landowners in Old East Dallas. The Wilson Block on Swiss Avenue was built by a descendent of the colonists.

The first brewery and butcher shop in Dallas were established by former colonists from La Réunion.

Starting in the 1880s, former colonist and geologist Emil Remond bought a parcel just west of the original colony and began fabricating bricks and cement from the clay and limestone near there. In 1900, his efforts convinced a group of Galveston investors to establish a factory for the Texas Portland Cement & Lime Company on colony land adjacent to the Texas and Pacific Railroad line. The industrial landscape that would develop has had a significant impact on surrounding West Dallas throughout the 20th century.

The La Réunion Cemetery, also known as Fish Trap Cemetery, stands on original colony land and still serves as the final resting place for some colonists. It is maintained by the City of Dallas and is located in west Dallas. The Daughters of the American Revolution placed a small memorial about the colony at a nearby golf course. The La Réunion Dallas historical site received a historic marker on April 10, 1924. The cemetery received a historic marker in 1974.

The Reunion District and Reunion Tower, completed in 1978, were named after the colony and are located a few miles east of where La Réunion once stood.

The La Reunion Cafe and Bar in the Bishop Arts District was opened in 2019, and is located a few blocks southeast of the namesake colony.

== Notable colonists ==
- Karl Bürkli
- François Cantagrel
- César Daly
- Victor Prosper Considerant
- Benjamin Long
- Julien Reverchon
- Clarisse Vigoureux
- Kalikst Wolski

== See also ==
- Charles Fourier
- Jean-Baptiste-André Godin
- Christian communism
- Icarians, a French utopian movement which attempted to set up a colony in Denton County in 1848.
- Utopian socialism
