= Georg Konrad Bürkli =

Swiss merchant and politician (1787–1873)

- Born: 2 June 1787; Zurich
- Died: 4 March 1873 (aged 85); Zurich, Switzerland
- Occupations: Merchant, politician
- Spouse: Anna Dorothea Escher vom Glas (m. 1811)
- Children: Konrad Bürkli; Arnold Bürkli
- Relatives: Johann Georg Bürkli (brother); Hans Conrad Escher von der Linth (father-in-law)

Georg Konrad Bürkli (2 June 1787 – 4 March 1873) was a Swiss merchant and politician from Zurich. He ran his family's silk trading business from 1811 to 1856, sat in the city council and the cantonal Grand Council, and was mayor of Zurich in 1831.

== Biography ==
Georg Konrad Bürkli was the son of Hans Georg Bürkli, a merchant and member of the Grand Council, and Anna Dorothea Meyer, and the brother of Johann Georg Bürkli. In 1811 he married Anna Dorothea Escher vom Glas, daughter of Hans Conrad Escher von der Linth. He was the father of Konrad Bürkli and Arnold Bürkli.

Bürkli trained as a merchant in Zurich and traveled to France and Italy. In 1811, after his father's death, he took over the silk trading business (Seidenhandlung), and he managed the family firm until 1856. From 1821 to 1831 he was a member of the city council (Stadtrat), from 1823 to 1831 a member of the Grand Council, and in 1831 he was mayor (Stadtpräsident) of Zurich. In view of the new political situation of the Regeneration, Bürkli did not stand for re-election.

== Bibliography ==
- Anzeiger für schweizerische Geschichte, new series, 1, 1870, 354
