= Konrad Bürkli =

Swiss merchant and politician (1827–1893)

- Born: Johann Konrad Bürkli; 15 June 1827; Zurich, Switzerland
- Died: 22 February 1893 (aged 65); Zurich, Switzerland
- Occupations: Merchant, politician
- Relatives: Arnold Bürkli (brother); Karl Bürkli (cousin)

Konrad Bürkli (born Johann Konrad Bürkli; 15 June 1827 – 22 February 1893) was a Swiss merchant and politician from Zurich. He was a partner in the silk-throwing firm Gebrüder Bürkli, a co-founder and president of the Zurich Commercial Society (Kaufmännische Gesellschaft Zürich), and a co-initiator of the National Exhibition of 1883. From 1878 to 1880 he was president of the Swiss Federation of Commerce and Industry (SHIV).

== Biography ==
Konrad Bürkli was the son of Georg Konrad Bürkli, the brother of Arnold Bürkli and a cousin of Karl Bürkli. He remained unmarried. He grew up in Zurich, trained as a merchant, and stayed in Marseille and Lyon from 1846 to 1848.

From 1848 Bürkli lived in Zurich, where he worked in his parents' firm until it was dissolved in 1856. From 1856 to 1882 he was a partner in the firm Gebrüder Bürkli, a silk-throwing mill (Seidenzwirnerei). From 1869 to 1878 he was a liberal member of the Cantonal Council of Zurich. In 1873 he co-founded the Zurich Commercial Society, sat on its board from 1873 to 1889 and was its president from 1876 to 1882. From 1878 to 1880 he presided over the Vorort, the managing body of the SHIV. In 1880 he was president of the building committee for the new exchange (Börse), and he was one of the initiators of the National Exhibition of 1883. Bürkli promoted the organization of commercial and industrial interests at the time of the emerging protective-tariff policy, and as president of gymnastics clubs and associations he advocated gymnastics as a means of popular education.

== Bibliography ==
- Neue Zürcher Zeitung, 23 February 1893 (second sheet)
- E. Richard, Kaufmännische Gesellschaft und Zürcher Handelskammer 1873–1923, 1, 1924
