= César Daly =

French architect and author

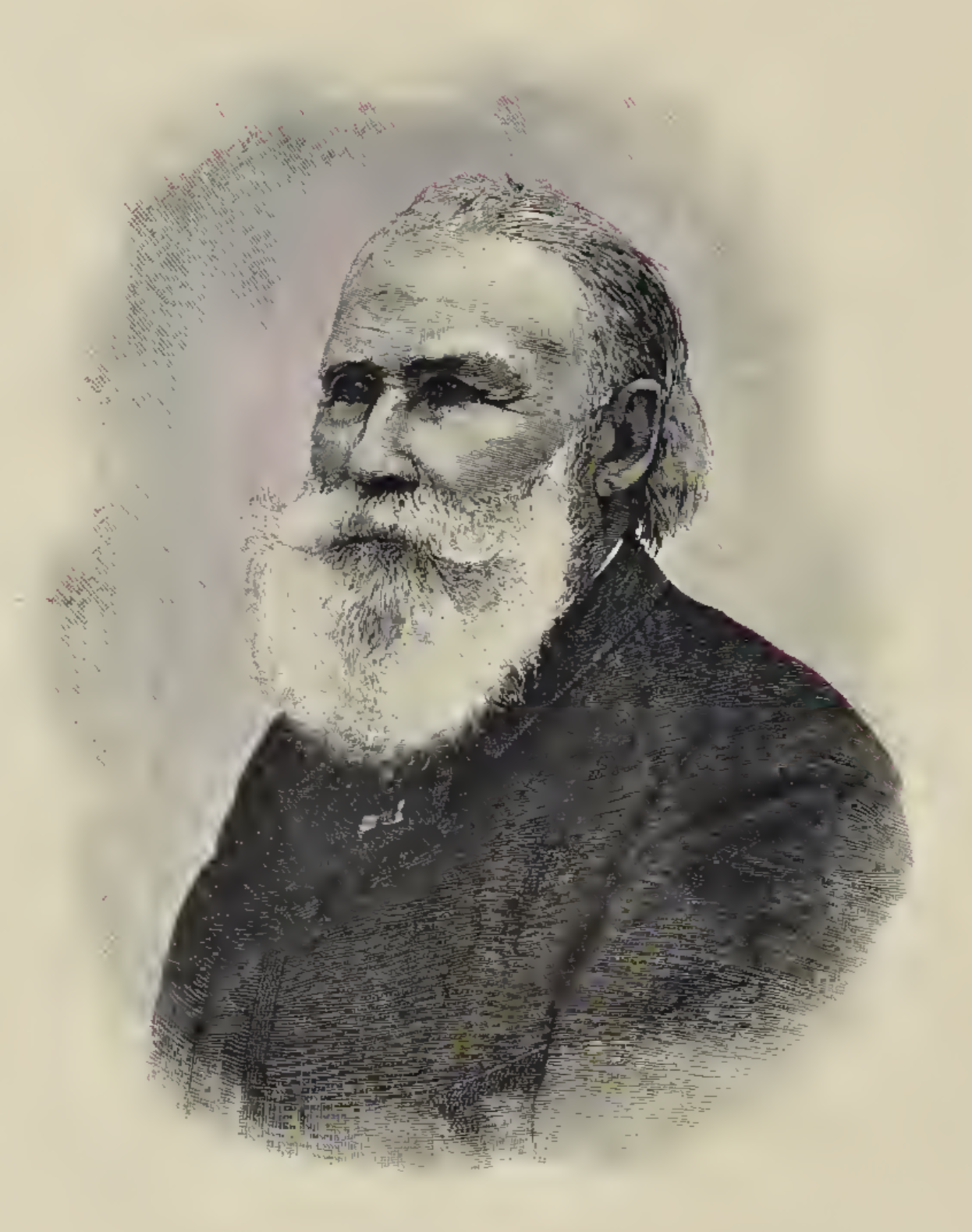
- Born: César Denis Daly; 17 July 1811; Verdun, France
- Died: 11 January 1894 (aged 82); Wissous, France
- Occupation: Architect
- Awards: Chevalier de la Légion d'honneur (1861); Royal Gold Medal (1892)
- Practice: architect, publisher, author
- Buildings: Restoration of the Cathédral of Sainte-Cécile in Albi

César Denis Daly (17 July 1811, Verdun – 11 January 1894, Wissous) was a French architect, publisher, and writer. He was one of the most important figures in the architectural press in nineteenth-century France, whose role as owner and editor of the famed periodical the Revue générale de l'architecture et des travaux publics shaped several generations of architects in France and beyond.

== Biography ==
Son of John Daley, a British food commissioner who was taken prisoner of war at Verdun during the Napoleonic Wars, and Française Calle Augustine Bernard, César Daly grew up in Douai. He became interested in architecture and pursued his studies in Paris in the atélier of Félix Duban at the École des Beaux-Arts (but he did not pass the entrance exams to formally study at the Ecole).

A precursor to Viollet-le-Duc, César Daly worked as a diocesan architect from 1843 to 1877, principally on the restoration of the Cathedral of Sainte-Cécile in Albi. He was named a member of the Commission des arts et édifices religieux (Commission of Arts and Religious Buildings) in 1848.

A supporter of the communal living embodied by the phalanastère and the socioeconomic theories of Charles Fourier, he founded in 1848 the ephemeral Société d'artistes décorateurs et industriels, and the same year, during the upheaval of the French Second Republic, stood as a candidate for the National Constituent Assembly.

During his travels, Daly visited the utopian colony of Icarians in Texas founded by Étienne Cabet. Later, he played a minor role in the establishment of the La Réunion colony in Dallas County, Texas.

Daly was named to the Légion d'honneur on 13 August 1861 and received the RIBA's Royal Gold Medal in 1892.

More than a practitioner on the ground, César Daly was also influential through his activities in associations and the publishing world of architecture. He was the secretary of the Société centrale des architectes, the Ecole's official alumni association, a remarkable achievement considering he had not even been admitted to the Ecole's course of study. He is best known today, however, for being the owner and founder of the Revue générale de l'architecture et des travaux publics (1840–1888) and the somewhat-less-known La Semaine des constructeurs (1877–1895), publications whose distribution was wide and frequently read by those in the design professions. He was also known as the author of several references works on architecture.

== Bibliography ==
- d'Aurevilly, Barbey (1997). Du dandysme et de George Brummell. La Petite Bibliothèque (in French). Paris: Payot & Rivages. ISBN 978-2-7436-0277-2.

== Publications ==
- Mémoire sur 32 statues symboliques observées dans la partie haute des tourelles de Saint-Denys, par Mme Félicie d'Ayzac, Précédé d'une introduction traitant du symbolisme dans l'architecture, par M. César Daly. Paris, 1847. In-8°, 206 pp. Excerpt from the Revue générale de l'architecture et des travaux publics; available on Gallica.
- Nos doctrines réponse à deux objections adressées à la direction de la Revue de l'architecture1860; available on Gallica.
- Des concours pour les monuments publics dans le passé, le présent et l'avenir, Paris: Revue de l'architecture, 1861; available on Gallica.
- L'Architecture privée au XIXe siècle sous Napoléon III. Nouvelles maisons de Paris et des environs. Paris, 1864, tome 1 available on Gallica.
- L'Architecture privée au XIXe siècle sous Napoléon III. Nouvelles maisons de Paris et des environs. Paris, 1864, tome 2 available on Gallica.
- L'Architecture privée au XIXe siècle sous Napoléon III. Nouvelles maisons de Paris et des environs. Paris, 1864, tome 3 available on Gallica.
- Les théatres de la Place du Châtelet : Théatre du Châtelet – Théatre-Lyrique (co-authored with Gabriel Davioud, Paris, 1865).
- Motifs historiques d'architecture et de sculpture d'ornement : choix de fragments empruntés à des monuments français du commencement de la Renaissance à la fin de Louis XVI (2 volumes, Paris, 1869).
- Des droits et des devoirs de l'architecte envisagés comme constituant le programme nécessaire de tout journal d'architecture, excerpt from the Revue générale de l'architecture et des travaux publics 28, (1870); available on Gallica.
- Architecture funéraire contemporaine. Spécimens de tombeaux… choisis principalement dans les cimetières de Paris et exprimant les trois idées radicales de l'architecture funéraire (Paris, 1871)
- Architecture privée au XIXe siècle (Deuxième série). Nouvelles maisons de Paris et des environs (3 volumes, Paris, 1872)
- L'architecture privée au XIXe siècle. Troisième série. Décorations intérieures peintes (2 volumes, Paris, 1874)
- Ingénieurs et architectes un toast et son commentaire, Paris, 1877; excerpt from the Revue générale de l'architecture et de travaux publics available on Gallica
- Des hautes-études d'architecture un appel à nos corps constitués et aux architectes indépendants..., 44 p., excerpt from the Revue générale de l'architecture et de travaux publics, 15th vol., 4th series, 1888. Paris: André, Daly fils; available on Gallica

== Sources ==
- Sylvain Bories, « César Daly [nécrologie] », dans Revue historique, scientifique & littéraire du département du Tarn, vol. 11, Albi, 1894 (ISSN 1141-1228), p. 12–24
- Hélène Lipstadt, Architecture et ingénieur dans la presse, Paris, CORDA-IERAU, 1980.
- Saboya, Marc (1991). Presse et architecture au XIXe siècle : César Daly et la Revue générale de l'architecture et des travaux publics (in French). Paris: Picard. ISBN 2-7084-0417-2. OCLC 26636087.
