= François Cantagrel =

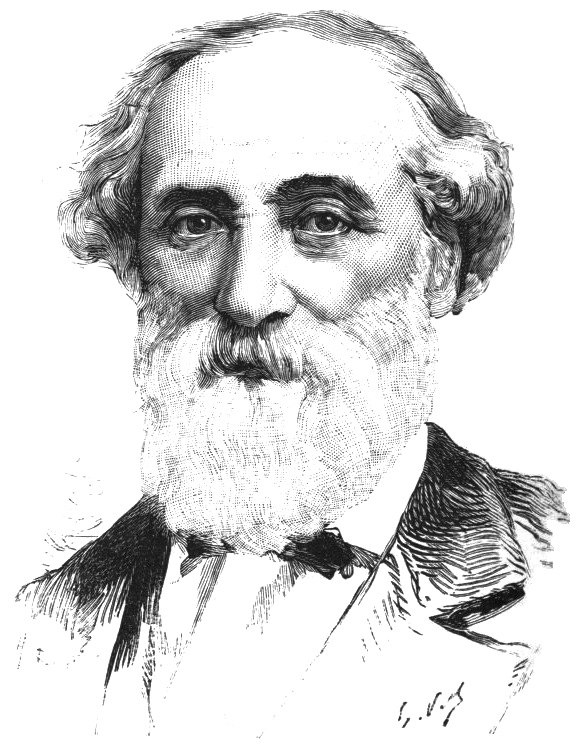
François Cantagrel

Félix François Jean Cantagrel was a French politician born June 27, 1810, in Amboise (Indre-et-Loire) and died February 27, 1887, in Paris.

== Biography ==
Cantagrel was born into a family from Aveyron.

A student in Paris in 1827, Cantagrel received a degree in Law from the University of Paris. He subsequently graduated from the Corps of Bridges and Roads with a degree in architecture.

=== Early career ===
Between 1834 and 1838, Cantagrel wrote literary criticism articles for the journal L'Artiste. A disciple of Charles Fourier, he founded the newspaper La Phalange, which later became La Démocratie pacifique.

Cantagrel was a member of Parliament for Loir-et-Cher from 1849 to 1850. He was convicted in absentia and stripped of his seat following his participation in the Paris insurrection on June 13, 1849. Prosecuted even before the 1851 coup d'etat of Napoleon III, Cantagrel went into exile in Belgium from 1849 to 1854.

=== La Reunion ===
Cantagrel was the first Director of the La Réunion colony located in Dallas County, Texas.

Cantagrel departed Belgium for Texas on October 3, 1854 as an advance agent for the European American Colonization Society of Texas, charged with preparing the colony for settlement. Along with a small number of additional colonists, Cantagrel was responsible for purchasing the land for the colony and beginning preparations for the colonists, before their arrival in early 1855.

Cantagrel resigned his position in 1856 and returned to France in 1859, after being granted amnesty for his demonstration against Napoleon III.

=== France ===
Cantagrel was the director of the Nantes newspaper L'Union Démocratique from 1869 to 1871. In 1871 and 1872, he contributed to the newspaper Le Radical.

An opposition candidate under the Second Empire, he was a municipal councilor of Paris from 1871 to 1876. He was a member of parliament for the Seine from 1876 to 1887, sitting on the far left. He was one of the 363 who refused to vote in favour of the Broglie government on 16 May 1877.

== Legacy ==
Cantegral Street in Old East Dallas is named (although misspelled) in his honor.

Rue Cantagrel in Paris is named after him as well.
