= Georg von Wyß =

Swiss historian

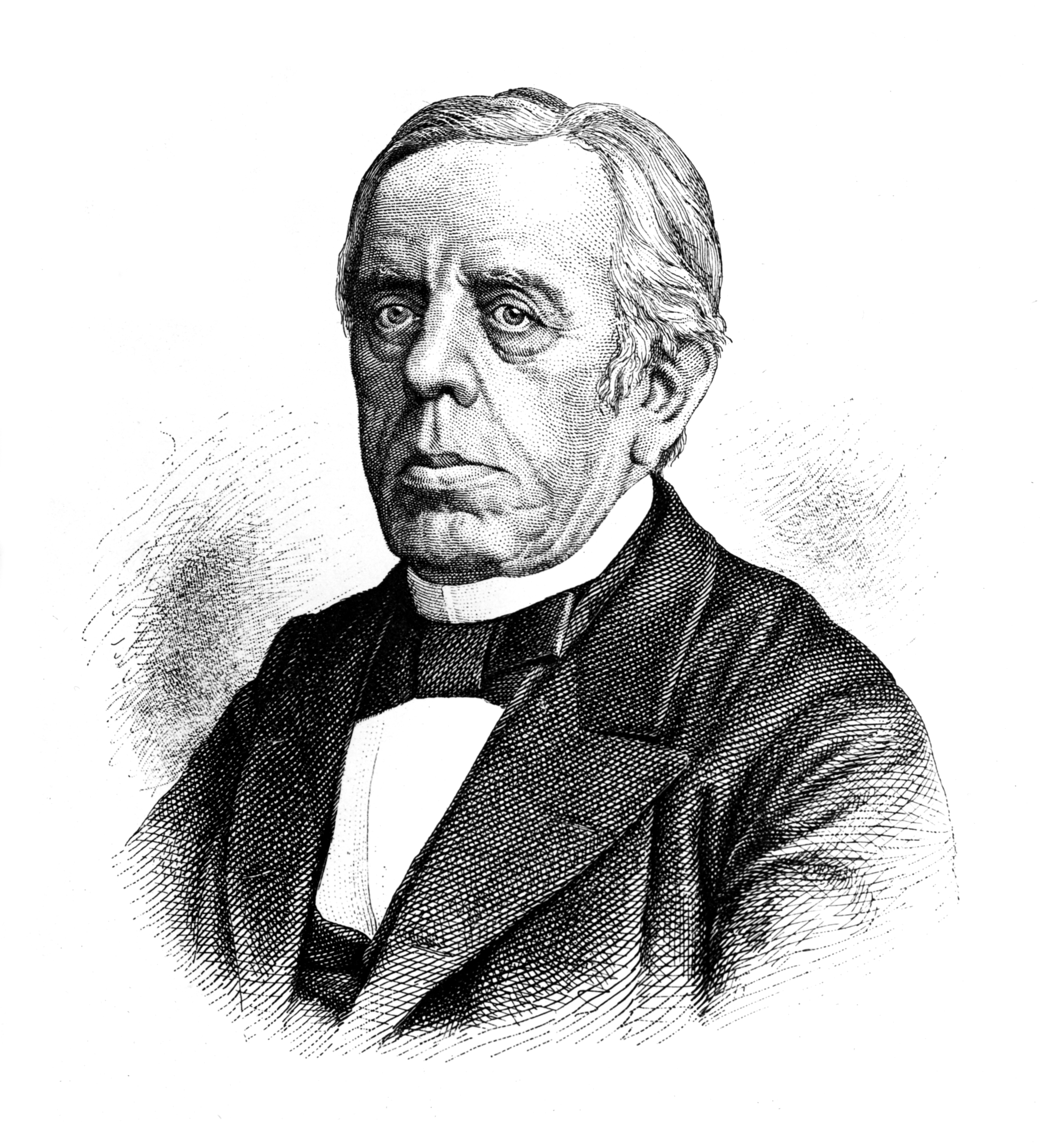
(UAZ) DOK.005.020 Wyss

Georg von Wyß (or Wyss) (31 March 1816 – 17 December 1893) was a Swiss historian. He was born and died in Zürich.

From 1870, he served as a "full professor" at the University of Zurich, being appointed rector in 1872. He was a founding member of the Allgemeine Geschichtforschenden Gesellschaft (1841), holding the office of president from 1854 to 1893.

Among his literary works is Geschichte der Historiographie in der Schweiz (History of historiography in Switzerland, 1895). Other significant writings by Wyss are:

- Biographie von Nicolo Paganini, 1846 – Biography of Nicolo Paganini.
- Zürich am Ausgange des dreizehnten Jahrhunderts, 1876 – Zürich at the close of the thirteenth century.

== Sources ==
- Historisches Lexikon der Schweiz short biography.
