= Johann Jakob Treichler =

Swiss politician and jurist (1822–1906)

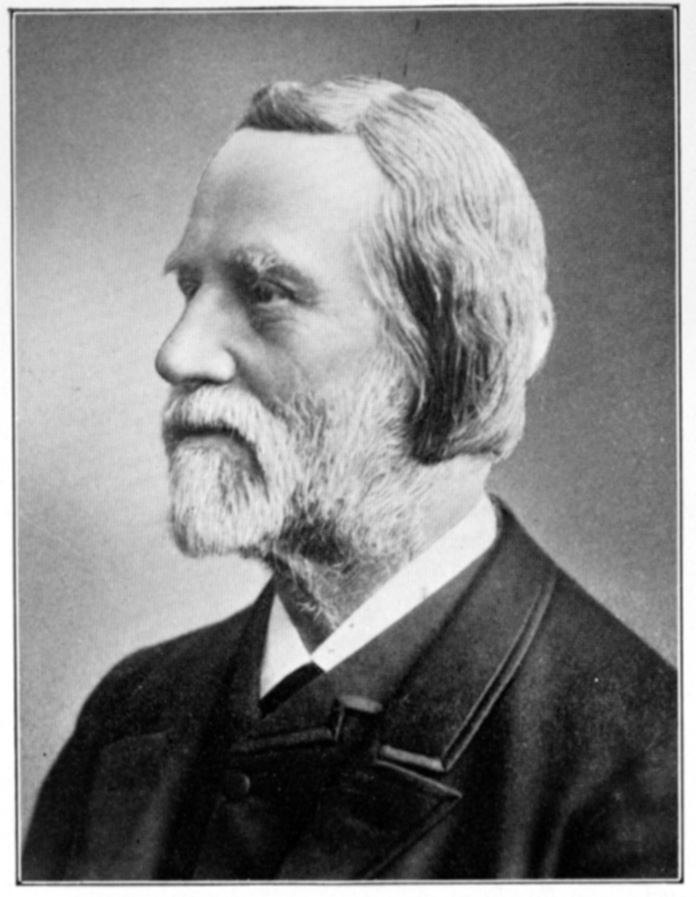
- Born: 26 November 1822; Richterswil, Switzerland
- Died: 7 September 1906 (aged 83); Zurich, Switzerland
- Other name: Chiridonius Bittersüss (pseudonym)
- Occupations: Lawyer; politician; professor of law
- Spouse: Anna Barbara Kölliker (m. 1850)
- Parents: Heinrich Treichler (father); Elisabeth Wyssling (mother)

Johann Jakob Treichler (26 November 1822 – 7 September 1906) was a Swiss politician and jurist. In the 1840s he edited the first socialist newspaper in Switzerland and, partly under the pseudonym Chiridonius Bittersüss, criticized the liberals. In 1851 he was one of the founders of the Zurich consumer cooperative. He sat in the National Council from 1852 to 1869, and after Alfred Escher won him over to the liberal system in 1856, he was a member of the Zurich Executive Council until 1869. From 1871 to 1895 he was professor of law at the University of Zurich.

== Biography ==
Johann Jakob Treichler was born in Richterswil, the son of Heinrich, a smallholder and home weaver, and Elisabeth Wyssling. In 1850 he married Anna Barbara Kölliker, daughter of Hans Rudolf, a physician. His schooling in Richterswil from 1828 to 1839 was interrupted by factory work. From 1839 to 1842 he trained as a teacher, and in 1842–1843 he worked as a teacher and publicly criticized the shortcomings of the Zurich school system. He then became secretary to Julius Fröbel and came to know Wilhelm Weitling and August Becker.

While studying law in Zurich from 1844 to 1846, Treichler edited the newspaper Der Bote von Uster in 1845 and then the Allgemeines Noth- und Hülfsblatt, the first socialist newspaper in Switzerland. He also presided over the Mutual Aid and Education Society (Gegenseitiger Hülfs- und Bildungsverein). Partly under the pseudonym Chiridonius Bittersüss, he criticized the liberals and advocated socialism. The 1846 law against communist activities (Gesetz gegen kommunistische Umtriebe) put a temporary end to his political involvement, and he opened a law practice in Zurich.

Treichler became politically active again, and in 1851 he was one of the founders of the Zurich consumer cooperative (Konsumverein Zürich). He sat in the Grand Council of Zurich from 1850 to 1869 (as its president in 1862 and 1867), in the Cantonal Council from 1869 to 1871 and from 1874 to 1905 (as its president in 1876–1877), and in the National Council from 1852 to 1869. In 1856, however, Alfred Escher won his opponent over to the liberal system, and Treichler entered the Zurich Executive Council (Regierungsrat), where he was in charge of justice and from 1864 of police, and to which he belonged until 1869. His position on the labor question changed, which made the cantonal factory law of 1859 possible. In 1861 he was expelled from the Grütli Union, and in 1866 the University of Zurich awarded him an honorary doctorate in law.

As a member of the Zurich constitutional council (Verfassungsrat) of 1868–1869, Treichler supported the extension of popular rights only with reservations, and he rejected the new constitution. From 1869 to 1871 he was a judge of the cantonal high court (Oberrichter). From 1871 to 1895 he was professor of law at the University of Zurich and from 1876 also at the Federal Polytechnic. He sat on the boards of directors of the Rentenanstalt from 1874 to 1884 and of the Schweizerische Kreditanstalt from 1876 to 1895. He died in Zurich on 7 September 1906.

== Bibliography ==
- E. Gruner, Die schweizerische Bundesversammlung 1848–1920, 1, 1966, 118–119
- F. Wirth, Johann Jakob Treichler und die soziale Bewegung im Kanton Zürich 1845–1846, 1981
- H.-U. Schiedt, Die Welt neu erfinden, 2002

=== Archives ===
- Zentralbibliothek Zürich, Zurich (papers)
