= Charles Cassal =

French politician (1818–1885)

Charles Cassal (1 April 1818 - 11 March 1885) was a deputy of the Second French Republic and professor of French at University College London. He was a Chevalier of the Légion d'honneur. His granddaughter, Mrs Dorothy Beatrice Staunton, established the Cassal Endowment Fund in memory of her grandfather and her father Celestin Cassal.
