= Jean-Baptiste André Godin =

French industrialist, writer and political theorist (1817–1888)

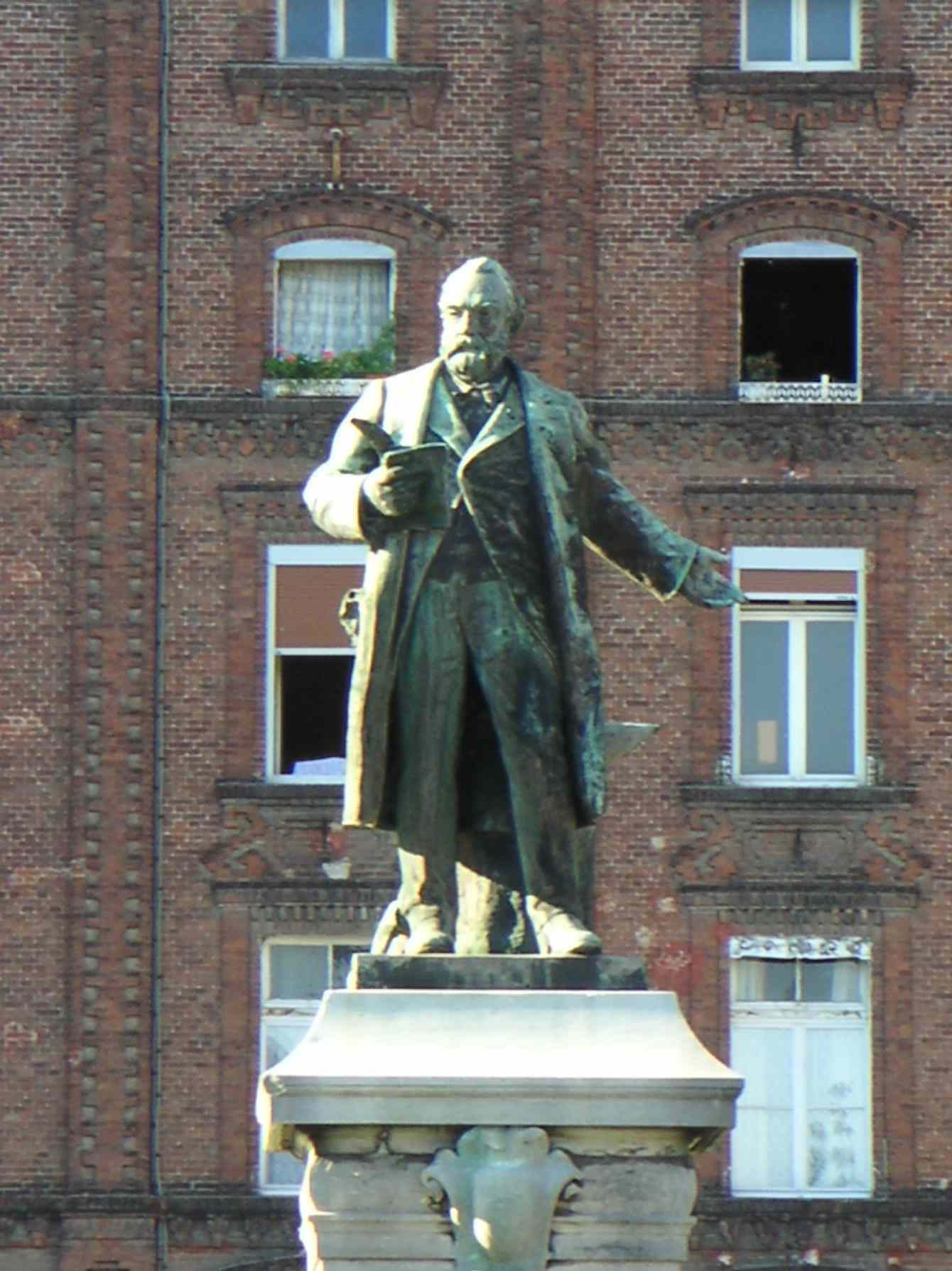
Statue of Godin at Guise

Jean-Baptiste André Godin (French: [ʒɑ̃ batist ɑ̃dʁe ɡɔdɛ̃]; 26 January 1817 – 15 January 1888) was a French industrialist, writer and political theorist, and social innovator. A manufacturer of cast-iron stoves and influenced by Charles Fourier, he developed and built an industrial and residential community within Guise called the Familistère de Guise (Social Palace). He ultimately converted it to cooperative ownership and management by workers.

== Early life and education ==
Born on 26 January 1817 at Esquéhéries (Aisne), Godin was the son of an artisan smith and his wife. Starting work at his father's forge, he entered an iron works at age eleven as an apprentice. At age seventeen, he made a tour of France as journeyman with his older cousin, Jean-Nicholas Moret, also an ironsmith.

== Marriage and family ==
In 1840, he first married Esther Lemaire, at the age of 23. They had a son M. Émile Godin.

On July 14, 1886, after his first wife had died, Godin married Marie-Adèle Moret (27 April 1840 - 18 April 1908), born in Brie-Comte-Robert (Seine-et- Marne). She was the second daughter of his cousin Jean-Nicholas Moret and his wife Marie-Jean Philippe. Before their marriage, she had worked at Le Familistère for nearly 25 years, where she established numerous services for families with children: the nursery, infant school, and primary school; taught teachers; and set up an insurance program for workers, as well as founding health facilities.

After Godin's death in 1888, Marie-Adèle helped care for the minor children of his son M. Émile Godin, who died 15 days after his father. She especially devoted herself to organizing Godin's papers, publishing some of his manuscripts, and working to keep Le Familistère going.

== Career ==
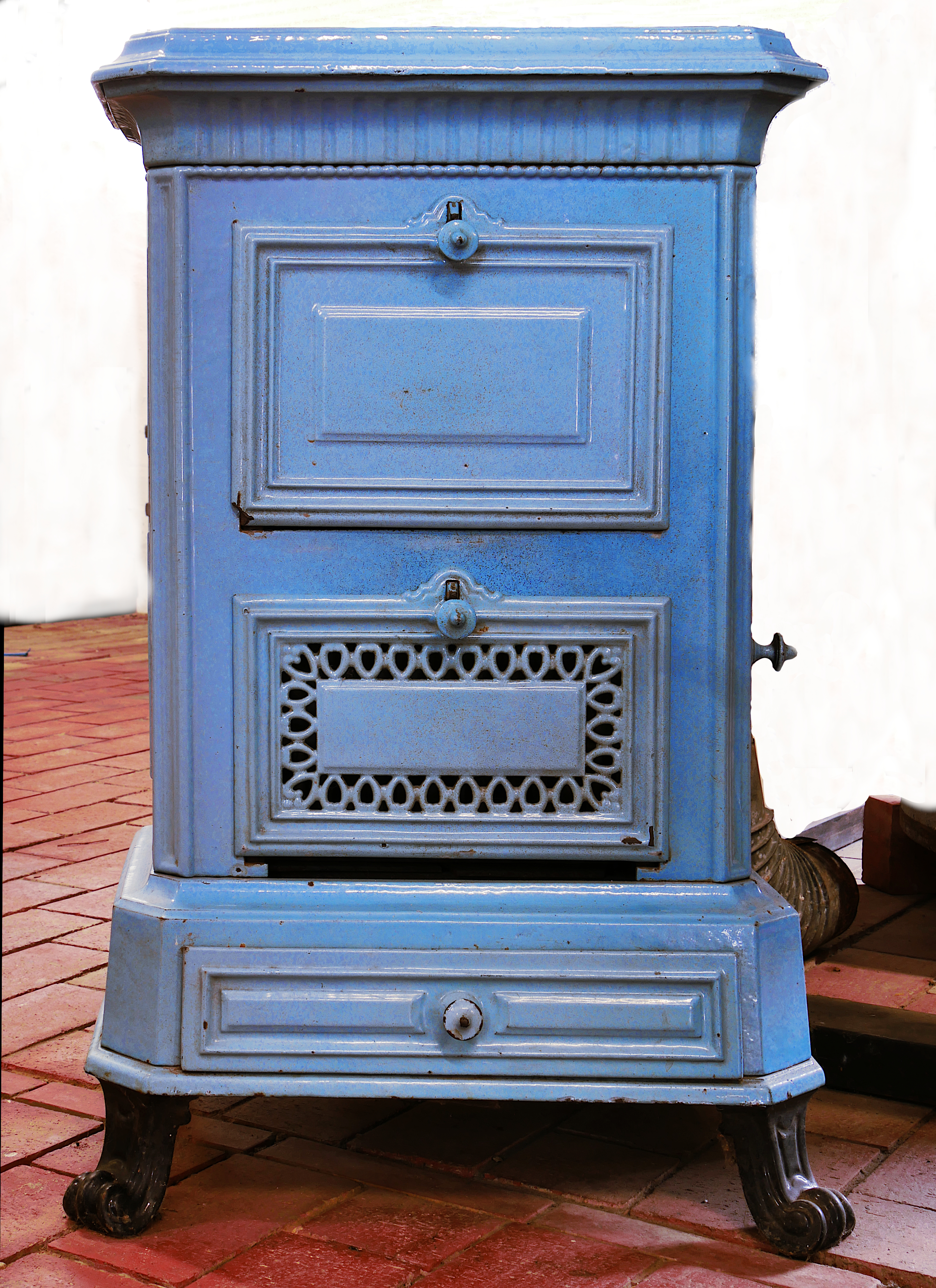
Oven from Godin's company in the Open-Air Museum Roscheider Hof

Returning to Esquéhéries with his new wife in 1840, Godin started a small factory for the manufacture of castings for heating-stoves. That year he took out a patent for the stove, which he had invented. He believed that this was going to be a useful product for the age. With his business increasing rapidly, to take advantage of the railroad at Guise, Godin moved the factory there in 1846. He manufactured cookers and heating stoves of many kinds, mainly made from cast iron. Sometimes these were enameled. He became quite wealthy and used his money to establish funds and development for workers.

At the same time, Godin and his cousin Moret had been learning about current socialist and communist thinking. Godin became an ardent disciple of the utopian Charles Fourier, whom he started studying in 1842, and thought hard about the future of workers and their communities. He helped fund V. P. Considerant's (q.v.) 1855 utopian community in Texas, known as La Reunion, at the site of present-day Dallas. He learned by its failure, due partly to colonists ill-suited as agricultural pioneers.

At the time of Godin's death in 1888, the annual output of Godin et Cie was valued at over four million francs (4,160,000). In 1908 the employees numbered over 2000 and production was over seven million francs annually.

== Godin's Familistère - its development and later history ==
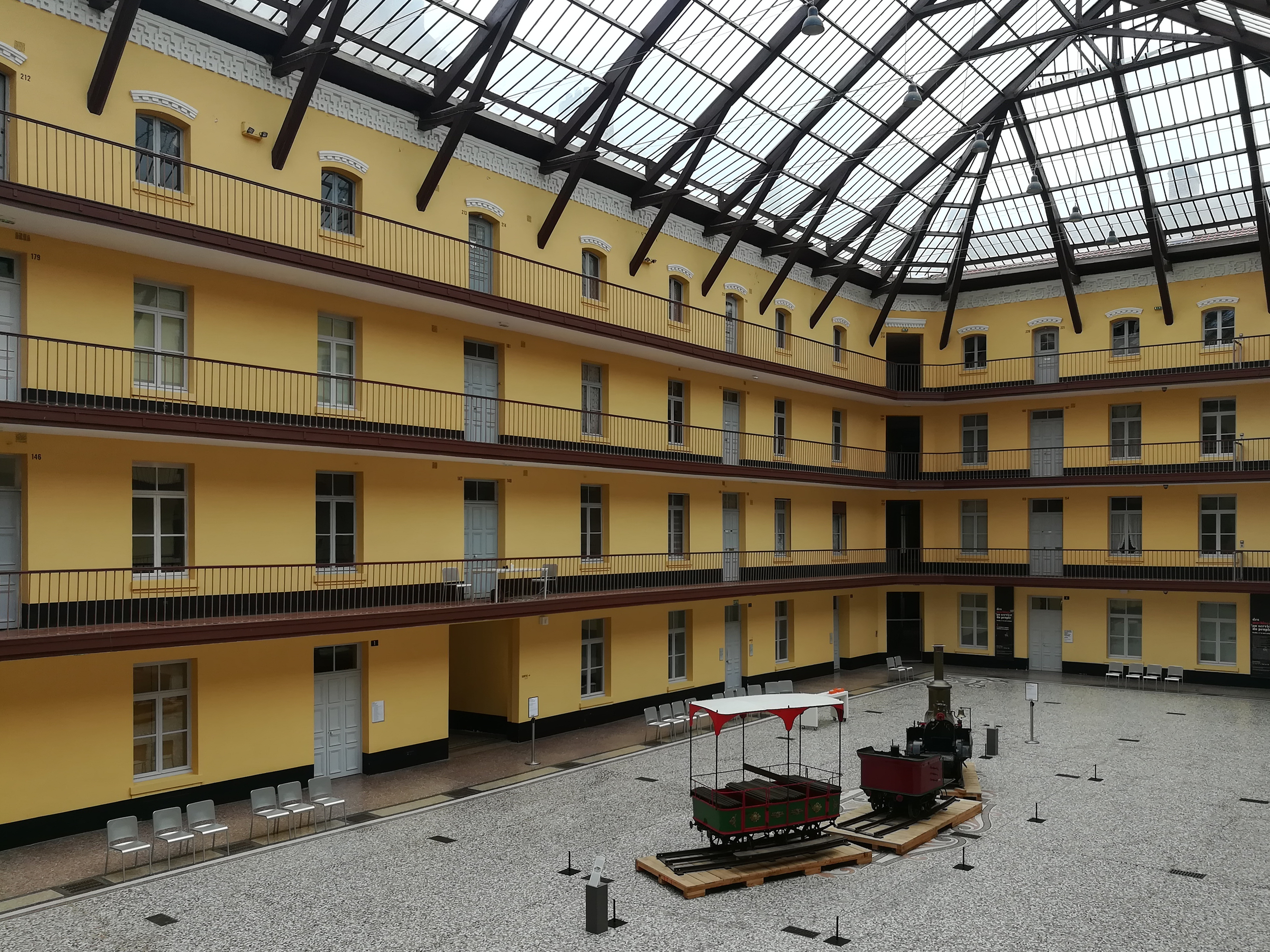
Le Familistère, central court

From 1856 to 1859 Godin started the Familistère (Social Palace) in Guise on more carefully developed plans. His intention was to improve housing for workers, but also "production, trade, supply, education, and recreation", all the facets of life of a modern worker. He developed the Familistère as a self-contained community within the town, where he could encourage "social sympathy". The full site with the foundry was about eighteen acres, on either side of the River Oise. In addition to a large factory for cast-iron manufacture, three large buildings, each four stories high, were constructed to house all the workers and their families, with each family having apartments of two or three rooms. The main building consisted of three rectangular blocks joined at the corners. Each of these blocks had a large central court covered with a glass roof under which children could play in all weather. Galleries around the courtyard provided access to the apartments on each floor. There were also garden allotments for the workers. By 1872, when a correspondent from the American Harper's Magazine visited the complex, 900 workers (including women) and their families were housed there, for a total population of about 1200.

The project contained no churches, but there were numerous churches elsewhere in Guise. At the back of the main block was a nursery, a pouponnat (or infant school) for toddlers and children up to age four, the bambinat for children 4–6. Opposite the main block was a building containing a theater for concerts and dramatic entertainments, and a primary school for children over six.

A separate block, known as the "économats", contained various shops, refreshment and recreation rooms of various kinds, and grocery and stores for the purchase of every necessity. Produce and goods were purchased at wholesale prices and sold with little mark-up, with workers manning the shops. Goods were stored beneath the buildings, where there were storage areas for the families.

Godin developed the Familistère over 20 years, beginning soon after the 1848 Revolution and disruption in France. Through it all he worked for social reform. During the Franco-Prussian War of 1870, he helped defend the country. In 1871 Godin was elected deputy for Aisne, but retired in 1876 to devote himself to the management of the Familistère. In 1878 he founded the journal Le Devoir (Labor).

In 1880 Godin created the association documents for the Familistère, converting it as he had long intended into a co-operative society, eventually to be owned by the workers. It was called l'Association coopérative du Capital et du Travail.

Godin died in Guise in 1888. When he died, it was expected that his widow would carry on leadership of the institution.

The workers and residents did eventually come to own the buildings and the foundry. The foundry operated as a co-op or joint-stock company for decades.

The building housing the nourricerie-pouponnat was destroyed in 1918 during World War I and never rebuilt. The foundry was still owned by the workers in the 1950s, but shortly after that the manufacturer Le Creuset purchased it. In 1968 the cooperative association for the Social Palace was dissolved, and the apartments were sold at moderate prices by Godin S.A. They have been gradually modified through individual owners' decisions. The same year, the cooperative economats were dissolved. In 1991 its building was classified as a Monument Historique, and in 2000 restoration of the building was begun.

In the early 21st century, some of the domestic buildings were restored for private, adaptive use. Restoration of the economats building was completed in 2008, with spaces adapted as a cafe, a bookstore and gift shop, and an exhibition area.

The communal laundry rooms, baths and swimming pool, in a separate building on the opposite bank, where water was heated by the factory, had become derelict but have been restored. The communal laundry has been converted to a meeting room, and the drying room to an exhibition room.

== Legacy and honors ==
- In 1882 Godin was created a Knight of the Legion of Honor.
- Working models of the Godin stoves are still to be found in use all over France, and some are for sale on eBay.
- Some of the domestic buildings at the Familistère have been updated for residents, and special purpose buildings have been restored for contemporary use. The site is open for visitors and tours, and there are plans to establish a museum of industry.

== Works ==
- Solutions sociales (1871);
- Les Socialistes et les Droits du travail (1874);
- Mutualité sociale et association du capital et du travail (1880); and
- La Republique du travail et la reforme parlementaire (1889).

== See also ==
- Utopian socialism
