= Montagney-Servigney =

- Commune
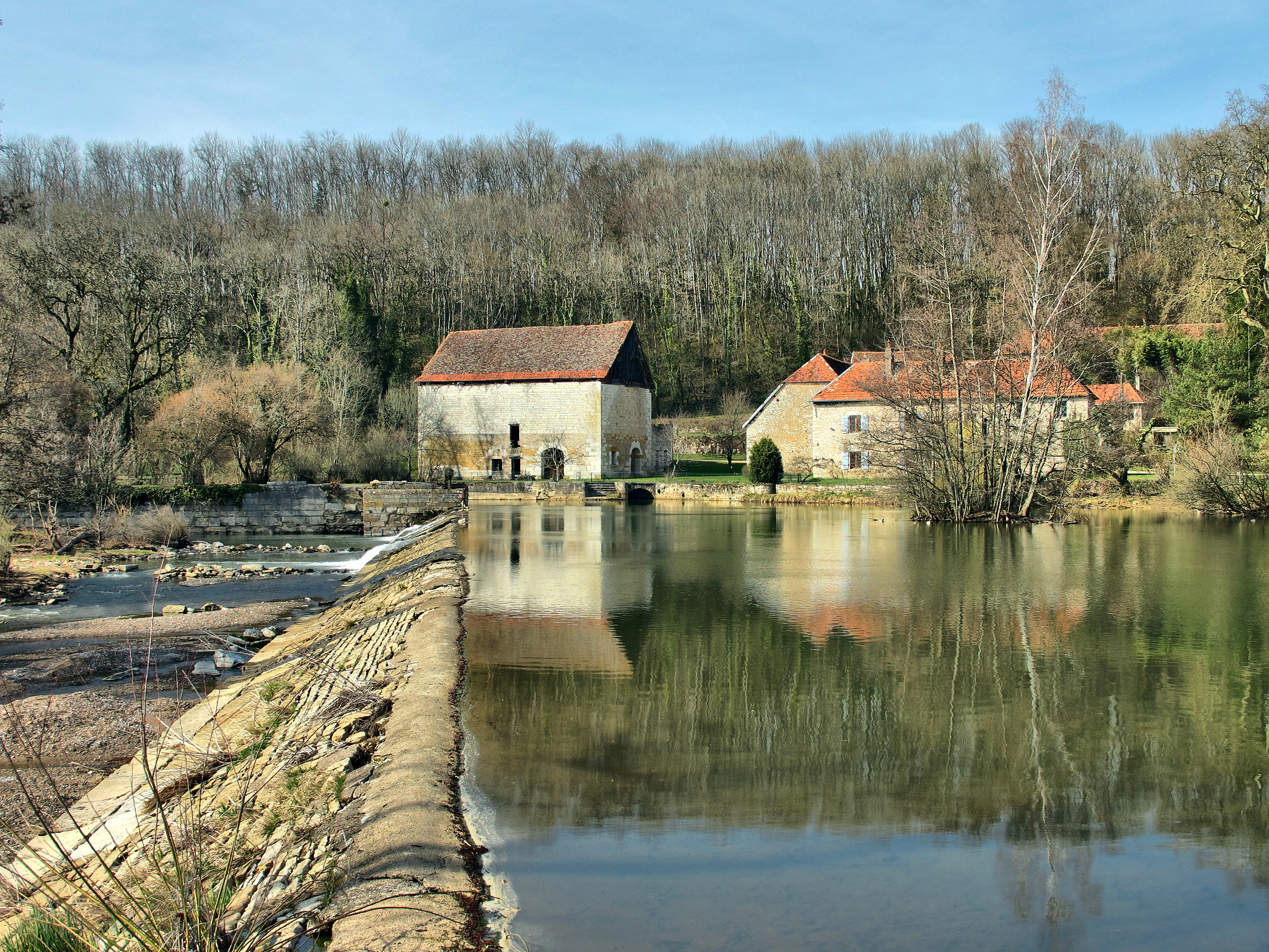
- Forge and dam on the Ognon
- Location of Montagney-Servigney
- Location within France Location within Bourgogne-Franche-Comté
- Coordinates: 47°28′55″N 6°18′26″E
- Country: France
- Region: Bourgogne-Franche-Comté
- Department: Doubs
- Arrondissement: Besançon
- Canton: Baume-les-Dames

Government
  - Mayor (2020–2026): Pierre Filet
- Area^{1}: 6.55 km^{2} (2.53 sq mi)
- Highest elevation: 297 m (974 ft)
- Lowest elevation: 241 m (791 ft)
- Population (2023): 121
  - Density: 18.5/km^{2} (47.8/sq mi)
- Time zone: UTC+01:00 (CET)
  - Summer (DST): UTC+02:00 (CEST)
- INSEE/Postal code: 25385 /25680
- ^{1} French Land Register data, which excludes lakes, ponds, glaciers > 1 km^{2} (0.386 sq mi or 247 acres) and river estuaries.

Montagney-Servigney (French pronunciation: [mɔ̃taɲɛ sɛʁviɲɛ]) is a commune in the Doubs department in the Bourgogne-Franche-Comté region in eastern France.

== Geography ==
The commune lies 4 km (2.5 mi) south of Rougemont.

== Population ==
Historical population
Year	Pop.	±% p.a.
1968	115	—
1975	111	−0.50%
1982	111	+0.00%
1990	130	+1.99%
1999	112	−1.64%
2007	108	−0.45%
2012	124	+2.80%
2017	132	+1.26%
2023	121	−1.44%
Source: INSEE

== See also ==
- Communes of the Doubs department
