= René Cantagrel =

German painter

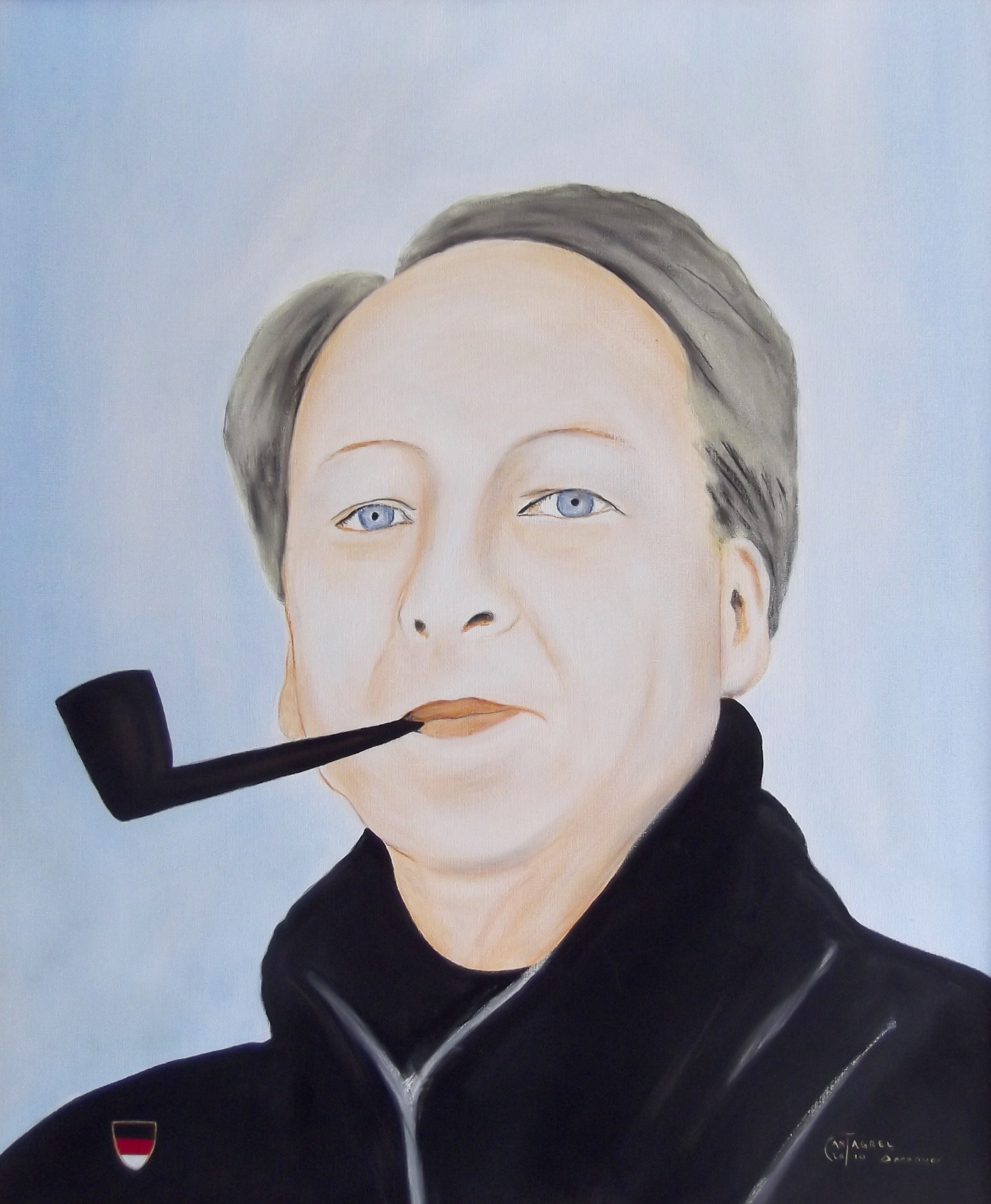
- Self-portrait of René Cantagrel
- Born: October 28, 1946 (age 79); Munich, Germany
- Occupations: Novelist, poet, painter

René Cantagrel (born October 28, 1946) is a German-French poet, novelist and painter.

== Early life ==
René Cantagrel was born on October 28, 1946, in Germany as the fourth child of the German-French couple Anna Bernauer and Marcel Cantagrel. His great-great-grandfather Johann Gustapfel was the shaper and smelter of the Bavaria statue in Munich. His great-great-uncle was the Munich sculptor Franz Bernauer.

He lived until 1954 in Munich. German is his native language. From October 1954, his parents moved to Narbonne, the birthplace of his father. In 1962 he began to write poetry in French.

After graduation, he studied German language and literature in Bordeaux.

From 1970 to 2000, he worked as a high school teacher, first in Périgueux (1970–1972), where he befriended a colleague, the future Minister Xavier Darcos, then in Bordeaux.

In 1984, the Parisian publisher Serge Livrozet published his first novel: Le Père Noël rouge which is, since 2015, part of the FeniXX collection, a digital re-editing company created in 2014 by the French Ministry of Culture and the National Union of Publishing.

In 1992, he married the native Parisian Patricia in Charenton-le-Pont. The marriage produced a son. Since 2003 Cantagrel lives in the Berlin area.

== Career ==
=== Writing ===
==== French publications ====
- Le Père Noël rouge, Novel (Les lettres libres, 1984)
- Rondels, Poetry (Les Éditions Mars, 1998)
- Le Poète prestigieux, Story (Les Éditions Mars, 1999)
- La Livrée rouge, Stories (Les Éditions Mars, 2005)
- Évasions, Poetry (Les Éditions Mars, 2005)
- La Dixième Planète, Poetry (Les Éditions Mars, 2006)
- Johannis Trencavel, Novel (Les Éditions Mars, 2008)
- Autoportrait, 378 Sonnets (Les Éditions Mars, 2009)
- Éclats d'un crépuscule, Poetry (Les Éditions Mars, 2014)
- Le Yéti et la Sirène, Novel (Les Éditions Mars, 2016)
- Les sapins vertigineux, Poetry (Les Éditions Mars, 2019)
- Face au soleil, Poetry (Les Éditions Mars, 2019)

==== German publications (selection) ====
- Das Mädchen, Stories (MARS Digital_Edition, 2016)
- Der Vater, Story (MARS Digital_Edition, 2016)
- Die Weihnachtsfrau, Stories (MARS Digital_Edition, 2016)
- Unmögliche Begegnungen, Novel (MARS Digital_Edition, 2017)
- Mord im Lavendelfeld, Story (MARS Digital_Edition, 2018)
- Waldgesang, Poetry (MARS Digital_Edition, 2019)
- Mord im Sehnsuchtsland, Novel (MARS Digital_Edition, 2019)

==== English publications ====
- The sun of her smile, Poetry (MARS Digital_Edition, 2019)

=== Painting ===
At the age of 14 René Cantagrel started to paint. He studied at the School of Fine Arts in Bordeaux (École des Beaux-Arts de Bordeaux) and at the studio of the Munich painter Lydia Künzler-Hochgesang. Different periods characterize Cantagrel's work. A classic, expressionist, blue and modern period. Since 1989 he presents his oil paintings in Bordeaux, Arcachon, Paris, Mérignac, Berlin. Some of his paintings are among others in the collections of Hanna Schygulla, Roger Hanin, Annie Cordy, Xavier Darcos or Franz Duke of Bavaria.
