= Johann Georg Bürkli =

Swiss politician (1793–1851)

- Born: 20 November 1793; Schinznach, Old Swiss Confederacy
- Died: 31 May 1851 (aged 57); Zurich, Switzerland
- Occupations: Merchant; politician; officer
- Spouse: Anna Wilhelmine Füessli (m. 1816)
- Children: Karl Bürkli
- Father: Hans Georg Bürkli
- Relatives: Georg Konrad Bürkli (brother)

Johann Georg Bürkli (20 November 1793 – 31 May 1851) was a Swiss merchant, politician and officer from Zurich. A representative of the conservative-aristocratic current that opposed the Regeneration, he sat in the Grand Council of Zurich from 1829 to 1842 and took an active part in the Züriputsch of 1839. In 1834 he co-founded the Aktientheater, and he was president of the central directorate of the Swiss Music Society.

== Biography ==
Johann Georg Bürkli was born in Schinznach, the son of Hans Georg Bürkli, a merchant and member of the Grand Council, and the brother of Georg Konrad Bürkli. In 1816 he married Anna Wilhelmine Füessli, daughter of Johann, a merchant. He was the father of Karl Bürkli.

Until 1827 Bürkli worked as a silk merchant in his parents' firm. After leaving it, he devoted himself to political, military and cultural activities. From 1829 to 1842 he was a member of the Grand Council of Zurich. In 1831 he commanded the federal intervention troops in Liestal, and from 1837 to 1840 he was administrator of the federal war fund; he held the rank of lieutenant colonel. From 1842 to 1848 he was a member of the city council (Stadtrat) of Zurich, from 1845 as its vice-president.

Bürkli represented the conservative-aristocratic current that opposed the Regeneration. As a member of the Faith Committee (Glaubenskomitee), which opposed the appointment of David Friedrich Strauss to the theology faculty, he took an active part in the Züriputsch of 1839. In 1834 he was a co-founder of the Aktientheater (the Zurich Stadttheater) and a member of its management (Intendanz). As president of the central directorate of the Swiss Music Society (Schweizerische Musikgesellschaft), he wrote biographies of musicians and travel accounts of the federal music festivals. He died in Zurich on 31 May 1851.

== Works ==
- Neujahrsgeschenk an die zürcherische Jugend von der Allgemeinen Musik-Gesellschaft, 1825–1837, 1839–1842, 1847

== Bibliography ==
- P. Lang, Karl Bürkli, 1920, 10–12
