= Victor Prosper Considerant =

French utopian Socialist (1808–1893)

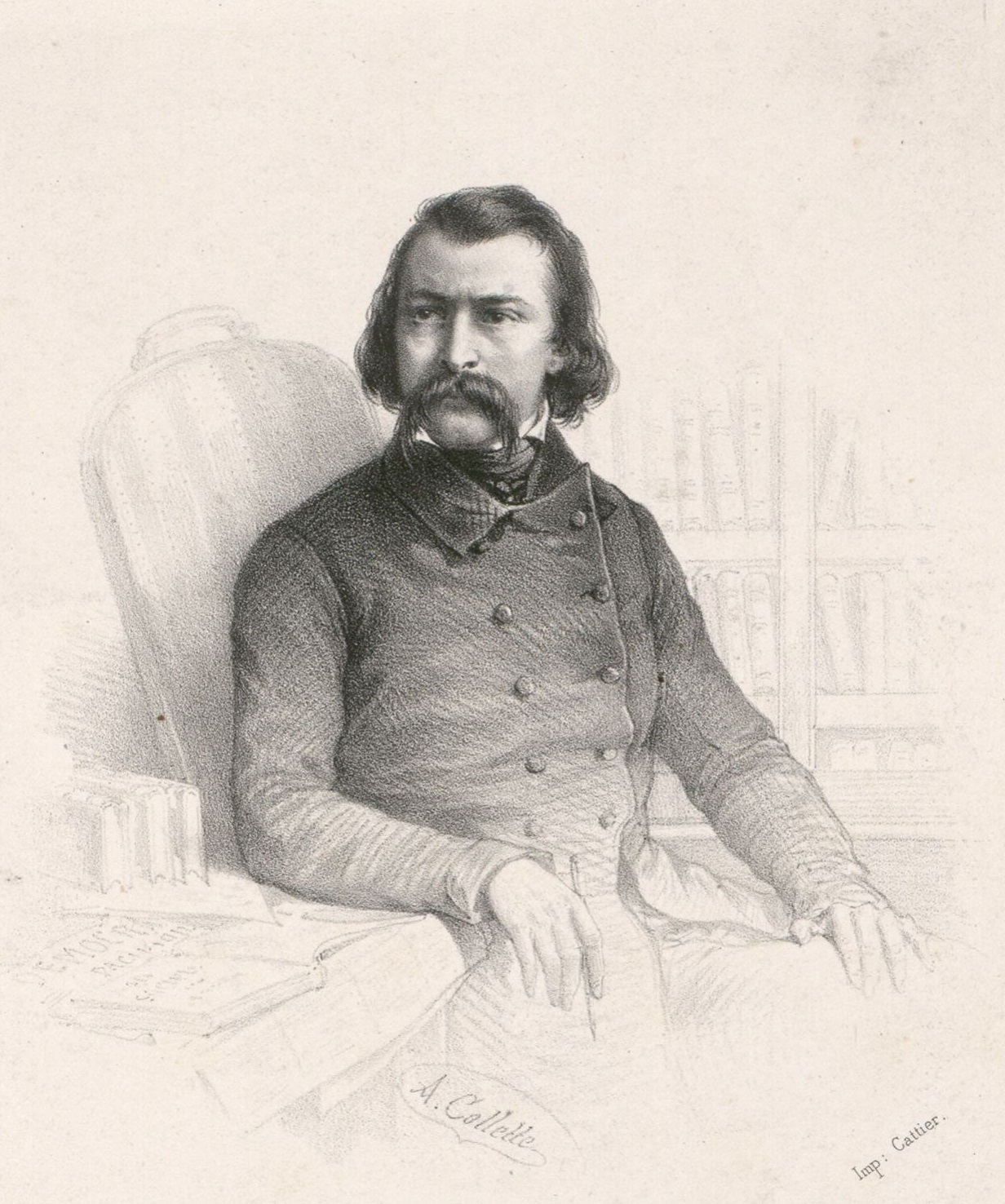
- Born: 12 October 1808; Salins-les-Bains, France
- Died: 27 December 1893 (aged 85); Paris, France

Philosophical work
- Era: 19th century philosophy
- Region: French philosophy
- School: Humanism
- Notable ideas: Feminism, socialism

Victor Prosper Considerant (12 October 1808 – 27 December 1893) was a French utopian socialist philosopher and economist who was a disciple of Charles Fourier.

== Biography ==
Considerant was born in Salins-les-Bains, Jura and studied at the École Polytechnique (1826 diploma). He entered the French Army as an engineer, rising to the rank of captain. However, he resigned his commission in 1831, in order to devote himself to advancing the doctrines of Fourier. Subsequently, working as a musician, he collaborated with Fourier on newspapers. He edited the journals La Phalanstère and La Phalange. On the death of Fourier in 1837, Considerant became the acknowledged head of the movement, and took charge of La Phalange.

His mother-in-law, Clarisse Vigoureux, introduced Considerant to the principles of Fourierism.

Considerant wrote much in advocacy of his principles, of which the most important is La Destinée Sociale. He authored Democracy Manifesto, which preceded by five years the similar Communist Manifesto by Marx and Engels. Considerant defined the notion of a "right to (have) work", which would be one of the main ideas of French socialists in the 1848 Revolutions. He is also known for having devised the proportional representation system. He also advocated such measures of "direct democracy" (a term he coined) as referendum and recall.

The failure of an insurrection against Louis Napoléon obliged Considerant to go into exile in Belgium in June 1849.

While exiled, Considerant visited the United States in 1853 on an invitation from Albert Brisbane; following his travels, he wrote a book titled Au Texas advocating for a socialist colony based in Texas.

In collaboration with Jean-Baptiste Godin and others, Considerant was a founder and first director of the La Réunion colony established in 1855 near Dallas, Texas.

After the failure of La Reunion, Considerant retreated to a farm in San Antonio where he advocated for a new colony in Uvalde Canyon. Considerant would live in Texas throughout the American Civil War, finally returning permanently to France with his wife Julie in 1869.

He was a member of the First International, founded in 1864, and took part in the 1871 Paris Commune. He died in Paris in 1893.

Contrary to a common error, his name is not written Considérant as he explained: "... there is no acute accent on my e. I have fought in vain for more than sixty years ever since my name was printed to defend it [from the accent]!"
