= Arnold Bürkli =

Swiss municipal engineer (1833–1894)

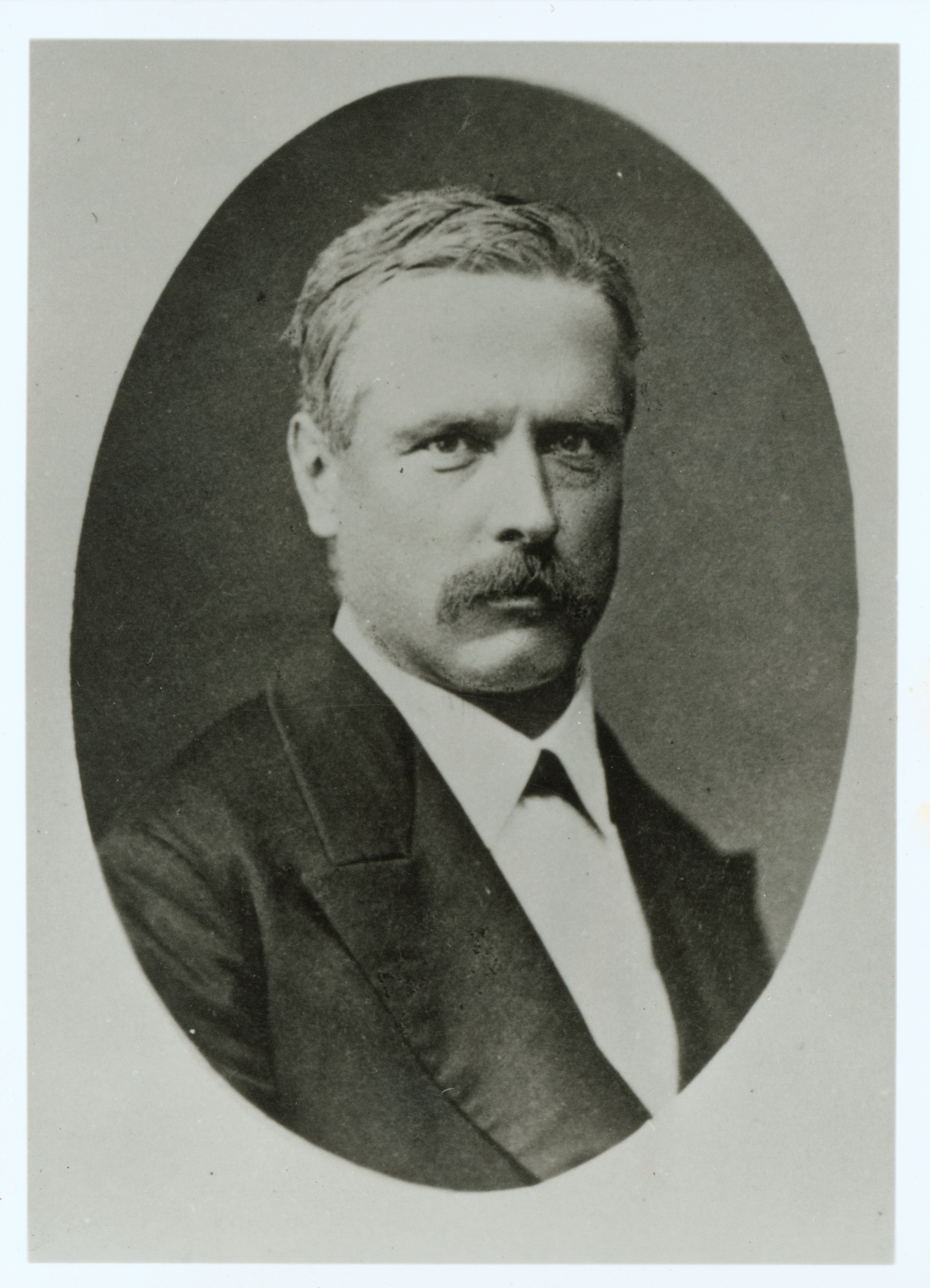
Arnold Bürkli, circa 1870

Arnold Bürkli (February 2, 1833 – May 6, 1894) is principally known as a municipal engineer in Zürich, Switzerland.

== Life and work ==
Arnold Bürkli was also a railway engineer and, between 1855 and 1858, studied architecture in Berlin. Between 1860 and 1882 Bürkli worked as a municipal engineer on a wide variety of construction projects. After 1867 he completely reorganised and improved the city's water supply and sewerage system, subsequently becoming known internationally as a water supply expert.

Bürkliplatz in Zürich was named after him, as Arnold Bürkli was the leading engineer in the construction of the Quaianlagen on the Zürichsee lake shore, as well as of the Quaibrücke bridge in Zürich.

== Memorial ==
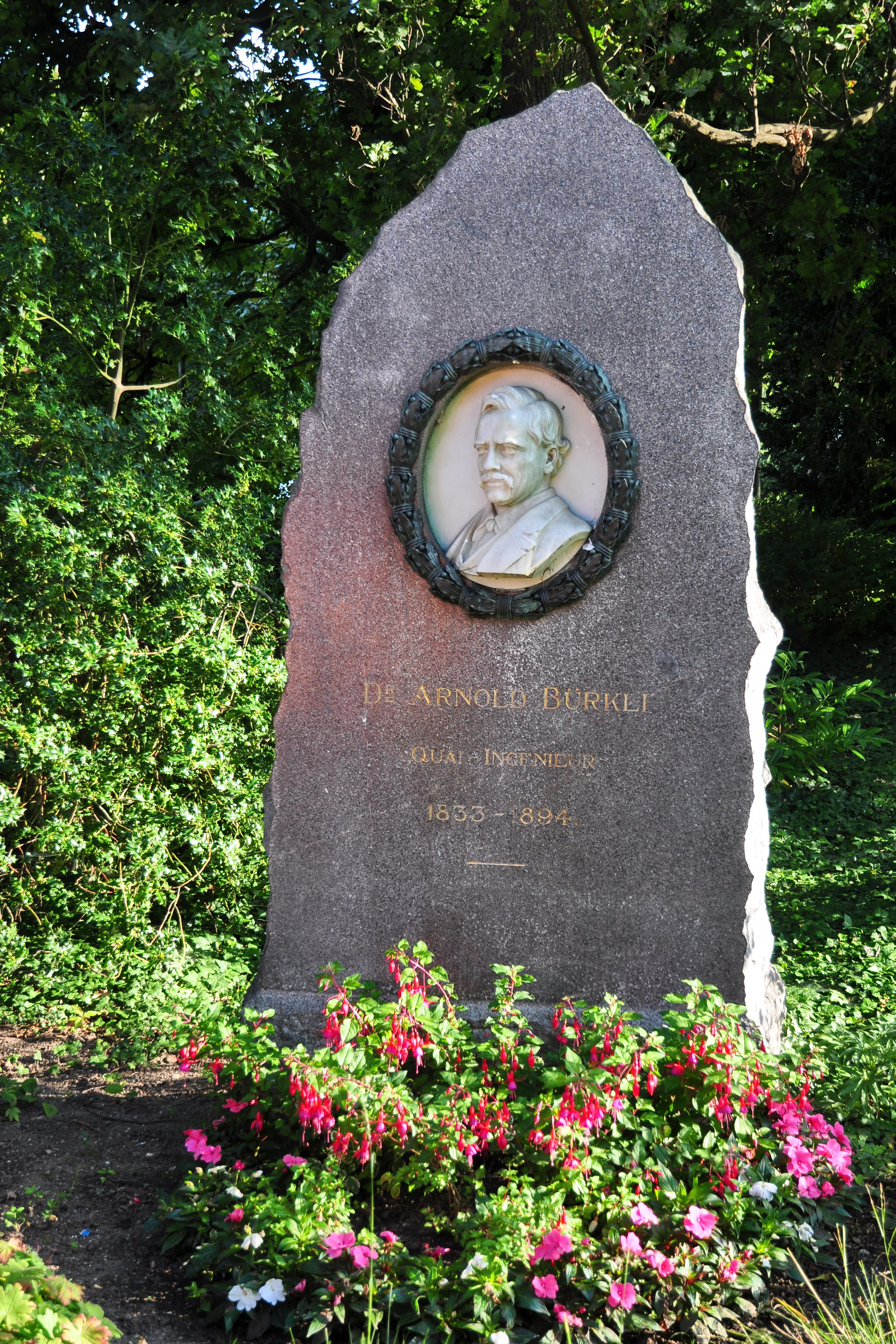
Arnold Bürkli memorial

The so-called Bürkliterrasse opposite of the Bürkliplatz is also named after Arnold Bürkli. A sculpture honoring the tireless creating engineer being the driving force behind the new quays stands at the foot of the lake shore hill that elevates around 3 metres (10 ft) at the Arboretum Zürich. The simple monument was inaugurated in 1899, five years after his death, at Bürkli's favorite place in the Arboretum, or, in the words of the sculptor Richard Kissling, in the midst of his creation.
